= List of awards and nominations received by Allison Janney =

Allison Janney awards and nominations
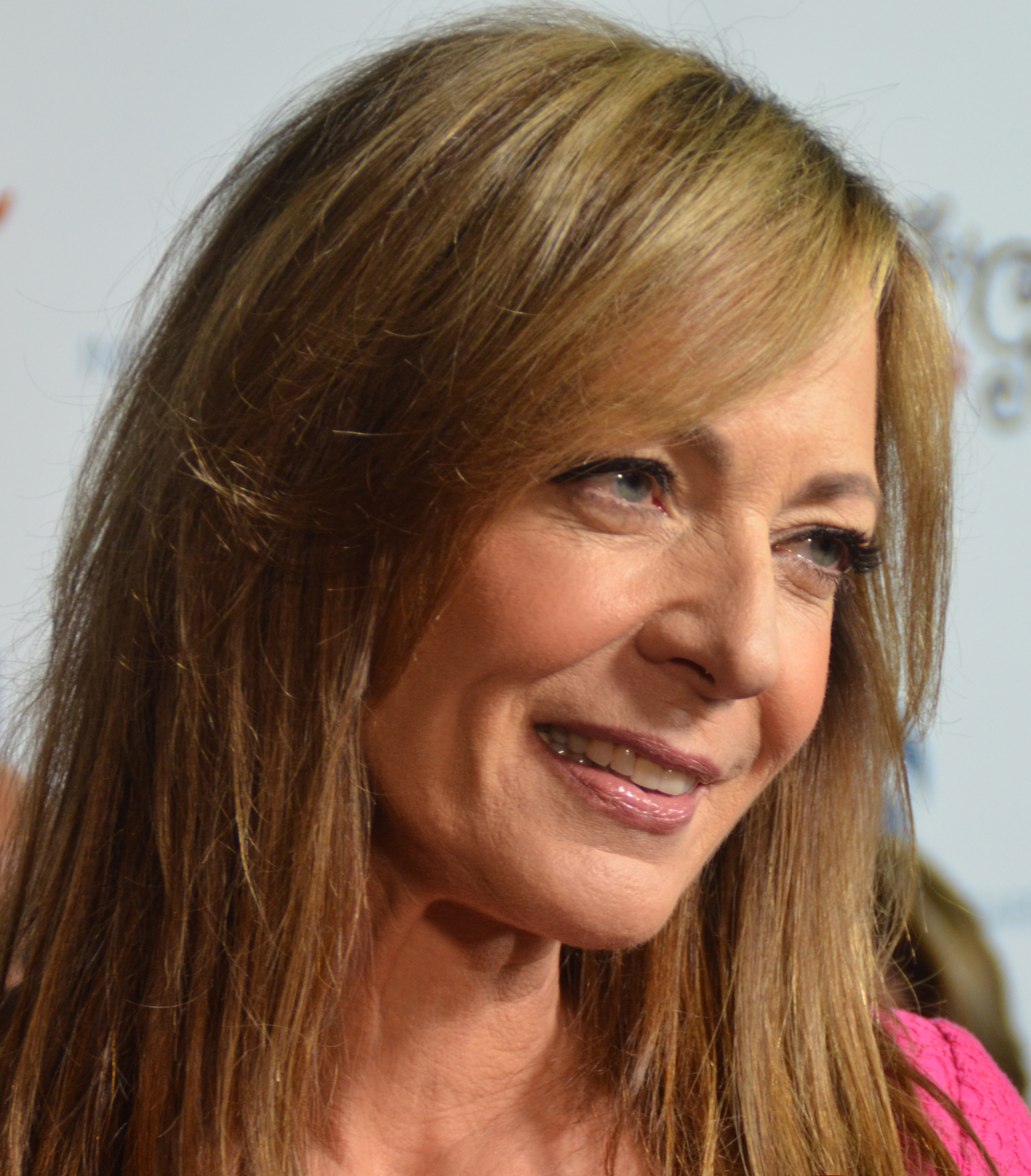
- Janney in 2014
Awards and nominations
Award	Wins	Nominations
Academy Awards	1	1
BAFTA Awards	1	1
Primetime Emmy Awards	8	16
Golden Globe Awards	1	8
Screen Actors Guild Awards	7	19
Critics Choice Awards	6	15
Tony Awards	0	2

Totals (Note: Certain award groups do not simply award one winner. They acknowledge several different recipients, have runners-up, and have third place. Since this is a specific recognition and is different from losing an award, runner-up mentions are considered wins in this award tally. For simplification and to avoid errors, each award in this list has been presumed to have had a prior nomination.)
- Wins: 111
- Nominations: 226

Allison Janney is an American actress who has received numerous nominations and has won multiple awards, including an Academy Award, a BAFTA Award, a Golden Globe Award, six Critics' Choice Awards, eight Screen Actors Guild Awards, eight Primetime Emmy Awards, two Drama Desk Awards and two nominations for the Tony Award.

After numerous years of minor supporting roles in films and television, Janney's breakthrough came with her portrayal of C. J. Cregg on the NBC political drama The West Wing, which earned her four Primetime Emmy Awards, four Screen Actors Guild Awards, and four nominations for the Golden Globe Award. She earned further Emmy wins for her performances on television series Masters of Sex, Mom, and The Diplomat, bringing her cumulative wins to eight. By virtue of this, she is tied for the most awarded thespian in the history of Emmy Awards (along with Cloris Leachman, Julia Louis-Dreyfus, and Jean Smart).

For her work on Broadway, Janney has received two Drama Desk Awards, three Outer Critics Circle Awards, the Clarence Derwent Award, the Theatre World Award, four nominations for the Drama League Award and two nominations for the Tony Award.

Janney has starred in various acclaimed films including American Beauty (1999), The Hours (2002), Hairspray (2007), Juno (2007), The Help (2011) and Bombshell (2019). All these films earned her nominations at the Screen Actors Guild Awards and Critics' Choice Movie Awards for Best Ensemble, winning for the first and the penultimate films. For her portrayal of LaVona Golden in the 2017 biographical film I, Tonya, Janney won the Academy Award, BAFTA Award, Critics' Choice Movie Award, Golden Globe Award, Independent Spirit Award, and the Screen Actors Guild Award for Best Supporting Actress.

== Major associations ==
=== Academy Awards ===
Year	Category	Nominated work	Result	Ref.
2018	Best Supporting Actress	I, Tonya	Won	

=== BAFTA Awards ===
Year	Category	Nominated work	Result	Ref.
British Academy Film Awards
2018	Best Actress in a Supporting Role	I, Tonya	Won	

=== Critics' Choice Awards ===
Year	Category	Nominated work	Result	Ref.
Critics' Choice Movie Awards
2003	Best Acting Ensemble	The Hours	Nominated	
2008	Best Acting Ensemble	Hairspray	Won	
2008	Best Acting Ensemble	Juno	Nominated	
2012	Best Acting Ensemble	The Help	Won	
2018	Best Supporting Actress	I, Tonya	Won	
2020	Best Acting Ensemble	Bombshell	Nominated	
Critics' Choice Television Awards
2014	Best Guest Performer in a Drama Series	Masters of Sex	Won	
2014	Best Supporting Actress in a Comedy Series	Mom (season 1)	Won	
2015	Best Supporting Actress in a Comedy Series	Mom (season 2)	Won	
2016	Best Supporting Actress in a Comedy Series	Mom (season 3)	Nominated	
2017	Best Supporting Actress in a Comedy Series	Mom (season 4)	Nominated	
2018	Best Actress in a Comedy Series	Mom (season 5)	Nominated	
2025	Best Supporting Actress in a Drama Series	The Diplomat	Nominated	
2026	Best Supporting Actress in a Drama Series	The Diplomat	Nominated	

=== Emmy Awards ===
Year	Category	Nominated work	Result	Ref.
Primetime Emmy Awards
2000	Outstanding Supporting Actress in a Drama Series	The West Wing (episode: "Celestial Navigation" + "Lies, Damn Lies, and Statistics")	Won	
2001	Outstanding Supporting Actress in a Drama Series	The West Wing (episode: "In the Shadow of Two Gunmen" (Part 2) + "Galileo")	Won	
2002	Outstanding Lead Actress in a Drama Series	The West Wing (episode: "The Women of Qumar")	Won	
2003	Outstanding Lead Actress in a Drama Series	The West Wing (episode: "The Long Goodbye")	Nominated	
2004	Outstanding Lead Actress in a Drama Series	The West Wing (episode: "Access")	Won	
2006	Outstanding Lead Actress in a Drama Series	The West Wing (episode: "Institutional Memory")	Nominated	
2014	Outstanding Supporting Actress in a Comedy Series	Mom (episode: "Estrogen and a Hearty Breakfast")	Won	
2014	Outstanding Guest Actress in a Drama Series	Masters of Sex (episode: "Brave New World")	Won	
2015	Outstanding Guest Actress in a Drama Series	Masters of Sex (episode: "Parallax")	Nominated	
2015	Outstanding Supporting Actress in a Comedy Series	Mom (episode: "Dropped Soap and a Big Guy on a Throne")	Won	
2016	Outstanding Supporting Actress in a Comedy Series	Mom (episode: "Terrorists and Gingerbread")	Nominated	
2016	Outstanding Guest Actress in a Drama Series	Masters of Sex (episode: "Matters of Gravity")	Nominated	
2017	Outstanding Lead Actress in a Comedy Series	Mom (episode: "Tush Push and Some Radishes")	Nominated	
2018	Outstanding Lead Actress in a Comedy Series	Mom (episode: "Phone Confetti and a Wee Dingle")	Nominated	
2021	Outstanding Lead Actress in a Comedy Series	Mom (episode: "My Kinda People and the Big To-Do")	Nominated	
2026	Outstanding Supporting Actress in a Drama Series	The Diplomat (episode: "Amagansett")	Won	

=== Golden Globe Awards ===
Year	Category	Nominated work	Result	Ref.
2001	Best Supporting Actress – Series, Miniseries or Television Film	The West Wing (season 1)	Nominated	
2002	Best Supporting Actress – Series, Miniseries or Television Film	The West Wing (season 2)	Nominated	
2003	Best Actress in a Television Series – Drama	The West Wing (season 3)	Nominated	
2004	Best Actress in a Television Series – Drama	The West Wing (season 4)	Nominated	
2015	Best Supporting Actress – Series, Miniseries or Television Film	Mom (season 1)	Nominated	
2018	Best Supporting Actress – Motion Picture	I, Tonya	Won	
2025	Best Supporting Actress – Series, Miniseries or Television Film	The Diplomat	Nominated	
2026	Best Supporting Actress – Series, Miniseries or Television Film	The Diplomat	Nominated	

=== Independent Spirit Awards ===
Year	Category	Nominated work	Result	Ref.
2005	Best Supporting Female	Our Very Own	Nominated	
2009	Best Supporting Female	Life During Wartime	Nominated	
2017	Best Supporting Female	I, Tonya	Won	

=== Screen Actors Guild Awards ===
Year	Category	Nominated work	Result	Ref.
2000	Outstanding Cast in a Motion Picture	American Beauty	Won	
2002	Outstanding Ensemble in a Drama Series	The West Wing (season 1)	Won	
2002	Outstanding Female Actor in a Drama Series	The West Wing (season 1)	Won	
2003	Outstanding Female Actor in a Drama Series	The West Wing (season 2)	Won	
2003	Outstanding Ensemble in a Drama Series	The West Wing (season 2)	Won	
2003	Outstanding Cast in a Motion Picture	The Hours	Nominated	
2004	Outstanding Ensemble in a Drama Series	The West Wing (season 3)	Nominated	
2004	Outstanding Female Actor in a Drama Series	The West Wing (season 3)	Nominated	
2005	Outstanding Female Actor in a Drama Series	The West Wing (season 4)	Nominated	
2005	Outstanding Ensemble in a Drama Series	The West Wing (season 4)	Nominated	
2006	Outstanding Female Actor in a Drama Series	The West Wing (season 5)	Nominated	
2006	Outstanding Ensemble in a Drama Series	The West Wing (season 5)	Nominated	
2007	Outstanding Ensemble in a Drama Series	The West Wing (season 6)	Nominated	
2008	Outstanding Cast in a Motion Picture	Hairspray	Nominated	
2012	Outstanding Cast in a Motion Picture	The Help	Won	
2018	Outstanding Female Actor in a Supporting Role	I, Tonya	Won	
2020	Outstanding Cast in a Motion Picture	Bombshell	Nominated	
2025	Outstanding Female Actor in a Drama Series	The Diplomat	Nominated	

=== Tony Awards ===
Year	Category	Nominated work	Result	Ref.
1998	Best Actress in a Play	A View from the Bridge	Nominated	
2009	Best Actress in a Musical	9 to 5	Nominated	

== Critic associations ==
Organizations	Year	Category	Work	Result	Ref.
Alliance of Women Film Journalists	2011	Best Ensemble	The Help	Nominated	
Alliance of Women Film Journalists	2017	Best Supporting Actress	I, Tonya	Nominated	
African American Film Critics Association	2014	Best Acting Ensemble	Get on up	Won	
Austin Film Critics Association	2007	Best Supporting Actress	Juno	Won	
Austin Film Critics Association	2017	Best Supporting Actress	I, Tonya	Won	
Black Film Critics Circle	2011	Best Ensemble	The Help	Won	
Boston Society of Film Critics	2017	Best Supporting Actress	I, Tonya	Runner-up	
Central Ohio Film Critics Society	2011	Best Ensemble	The Help	Nominated	
Central Ohio Film Critics Society	2017	Best Supporting Actress	I, Tonya	Nominated	
Chicago Film Critics Association	2017	Best Supporting Actress	I, Tonya	Nominated	
Chicago Indie Critics Awards	2017	Best Supporting Actress	I, Tonya	Won	
Chlotrudis Society for Independent Film Awards	1996	Best Supporting Actress	Big Night	Nominated	
Chlotrudis Society for Independent Film Awards	2007	Best Supporting Actress	Juno	Nominated	
Chlotrudis Society for Independent Film Awards	2013	Best Supporting Actress	The Way, Way Back	Nominated	
Chlotrudis Society for Independent Film Awards	2017	Best Supporting Actress	I, Tonya	Nominated	
Chlotrudis Society for Independent Film Awards	2017	Best Performance by an Ensemble Cast	I, Tonya	Nominated	
Chlotrudis Society for Independent Film Awards	2022	Best Supporting Actress	To Leslie	Nominated	
Columbus Film Critics Association	2017	Best Supporting Actress	I, Tonya	Runner-up	
Dallas–Fort Worth Film Critics Association	2017	Best Supporting Actress	I, Tonya	Won	
Denver Film Critics Society Awards	2017	Best Supporting Actress	I, Tonya	Won	
Detroit Film Critics Society Awards	2011	Best Ensemble	The Help	Nominated	
Detroit Film Critics Society Awards	2017	Best Supporting Actress	I, Tonya	Won	
Florida Film Critics Circle Awards	2017	Best Supporting Actress	I, Tonya	Won	
Florida Film Critics Circle Awards	2017	Best Cast	I, Tonya	Nominated	
Georgia Film Critics Association	2017	Best Supporting Actress	I, Tonya	Nominated	
Hawaii Film Critics Society Awards	2017	Best Supporting Actress	I, Tonya	Nominated	
Houston Film Critics Society Awards	2017	Best Supporting Actress	I, Tonya	Won	
Indiana Film Journalists Association	2017	Best Supporting Actress	I, Tonya	Runner-up	
IndieWire Critics Poll Awards	2017	Best Supporting Actress	I, Tonya	3rd Place	
Las Vegas Film Critics Society	2017	Best Supporting Actress	I, Tonya	Runner-up	
London Film Critics Circle	2017	Supporting Actress of the Year	I, Tonya	Nominated	
Los Angeles Online Film Critics Society	2017	Best Supporting Actress	I, Tonya	Won	
Memphis Online Film Critics Awards	2017	Best Supporting Actress	I, Tonya	Nominated	
National Society of Film Critics	2017	Best Supporting Actress	I, Tonya	2nd Runner-up	
Nevada Film Critics Society Awards	2011	Best Ensemble	The Help	Won	
Nevada Film Critics Society Awards	2017	Best Supporting Actress	I, Tonya	Won	
New York Film Critics Online Awards	2017	Best Supporting Actress	I, Tonya	Won	
North Carolina Film Critics Association	2017	Best Supporting Actress	I, Tonya	Nominated	
North Texas Film Critics Association	2017	Best Supporting Actress	I, Tonya	4th Place	
Oklahoma Film Critics Circle	2017	Best Supporting Actress	I, Tonya	Runner-up	
Online Film Critics Society Awards	2000	Best Cast	American Beauty	Won	
Online Film Critics Society Awards	2017	Best Supporting Actress	I, Tonya	Runner-up	
Online Film & Television Association Awards	2000	Best Actress in a New Drama Series	The West Wing	Nominated	
Online Film & Television Association Awards	2000	Best Supporting Actress in a Drama Series	The West Wing	Won	
Online Film & Television Association Awards	2001	Best Supporting Actress in a Drama Series	The West Wing	Nominated	
Online Film & Television Association Awards	2002	Best Actress in a Drama Series	The West Wing	Nominated	
Online Film & Television Association Awards	2002	Best Guest Actress in a Comedy Series	Frasier	Nominated	
Online Film & Television Association Awards	2003	Best Actress in a Drama Series	The West Wing	Nominated	
Online Film & Television Association Awards	2004	Best Actress in a Drama Series	The West Wing	Nominated	
Online Film & Television Association Awards	2007	Best Guest Actress in a Drama Series	Studio 60 on the Sunset Strip	Won	
Online Film & Television Association Awards	2013	Best Guest Actress in a Comedy Series	Veep	Won	
Online Film & Television Association Awards	2014	Best Guest Actress in a Drama Series	Master of Sex	Nominated	
Online Film & Television Association Awards	2014	Best Supporting Actress in a Comedy Series	Mom	Won	
Online Film & Television Association Awards	2015	Best Guest Actress in a Drama Series	Master of Sex	Nominated	
Online Film & Television Association Awards	2015	Best Supporting Actress in a Comedy Series	Mom	Won	
Online Film & Television Association Awards	2016	Best Supporting Actress in a Comedy Series	Mom	Won	
Online Film & Television Association Awards	2017	Best Actress in a Comedy Series	Mom	Nominated	
Online Film & Television Association Awards	2017	Best Supporting Actress	I, Tonya	Won	
Philadelphia Film Critics Circle	2017	Best Supporting Actress	I, Tonya	Won	
Phoenix Critics Circle Awards	2017	Best Supporting Actress	I, Tonya	Nominated	
Phoenix Film Critics Society Awards	2003	Best Cast	The Hours	Nominated	
Phoenix Film Critics Society Awards	2013	Best Cast	The Way Way Back	Nominated	
Phoenix Film Critics Society Awards	2017	Best Supporting Actress	I, Tonya	Won	
San Diego Film Critics Society	2011	Best Ensemble Performance	The Help	Nominated	
San Diego Film Critics Society	2013	Best Ensemble Performance	The Way, Way Back	Nominated	
San Diego Film Critics Society	2017	Best Supporting Actress	I, Tonya	Won	
San Francisco Film Critics Circle	2017	Best Supporting Actress	I, Tonya	Nominated	
Seattle Film Critics Society Awards	2017	Best Supporting Actress	I, Tonya	Nominated	
Southeastern Film Critics Association	2011	Best Cast	The Help	Won	
Southeastern Film Critics Association	2017	Best Supporting Actress	I, Tonya	Runner-up	
St. Louis Film Critics Association	2017	Best Supporting Actress	I, Tonya	Nominated	
Television Critics Association Awards	2000	Individual Achievement in Drama	The West Wing	Nominated	
Toronto Film Critics Association	2017	Best Supporting Actress	I, Tonya	Nominated	
Utah Film Critics Association	2017	Best Supporting Actress	I, Tonya	Runner-up	
Vancouver Film Critics Circle Awards	2017	Best Supporting Actress	I, Tonya	Nominated	
Village Voice Film Poll	2017	Best Supporting Performance	I, Tonya	Nominated	
Washington D.C. Area Film Critics Association	2011	Best Ensemble	The Help	Nominated	
Washington D.C. Area Film Critics Association	2013	Best Ensemble	The Way, Way Back	Nominated	
Washington D.C. Area Film Critics Association	2017	Best Supporting Actress	I, Tonya	Nominated	
Wisconsin Film Critics Circle Awards	2017	Best Supporting Actress	I, Tonya	Won	
Women Film Critics Circle Awards	2011	Best Ensemble	The Help	Won	
Women Film Critics Circle Awards	2017	Best Supporting Actress	I, Tonya	Won	
Women Film Critics Circle Awards	2017	Best Comedic Actress	I, Tonya	Won	
Women Film Critics Circle Awards	2017	Mommie Dearest Worst Screen Mom of the Year Award	I, Tonya	Won	

== Theatre awards ==
Organizations	Year	Category	Work	Result	Ref.
Clarence Derwent Awards	1997	Most Promising Female	Present Laughter	Won	
Drama Desk Awards	1997	Outstanding Featured Actress in a Play	Present Laughter	Nominated	
Drama Desk Awards	1998	Outstanding Featured Actress in a Play	A View from the Bridge	Won	
Drama Desk Awards	2009	Outstanding Actress in a Musical	9 to 5	Won	
Drama League Awards	2009	Distinguished Performance	9 to 5	Nominated	
Drama League Awards	2017	Distinguished Performance	Six Degrees of Separation	Nominated	
Outer Critics Circle Awards	1997	Outstanding Supporting Actress in a Play	Present Laughter	Won	
Outer Critics Circle Awards	1998	Outstanding Lead Actress in a Play	A View from the Bridge	Won	
Outer Critics Circle Awards	2009	Outstanding Lead Actress in a Musical	9 to 5	Nominated	
Outer Critics Circle Awards	2017	Outstanding Lead Actress in a Play	Six Degrees of Separation	Nominated	
Ovation Awards	2009	Best Actress in a Musical	9 to 5	Nominated	
Theatre World Awards	1997	Theatre World Award	Present Laughter	Won	

== Miscellaneous awards ==
Organizations	Year	Category	Work	Result	Ref.
AACTA Awards	2017	Best International Supporting Actress – Cinema	I, Tonya	Won	
AARP Movies for Grownups Awards	2011	Best Supporting Actress	The Help	Nominated	
AARP Movies for Grownups Awards	2013	Best Supporting Actress	The Way, Way Back	Won	
AARP Movies for Grownups Awards	2017	Best Supporting Actress	I, Tonya	Nominated	
American Comedy Awards	2014	Comedy Supporting Actress- TV	Mom	Nominated	
American Film Institute	2002	Actor of the Year - Female - TV Series	The West Wing	Nominated	
Awards Circuit Community Awards	1999	Best Ensemble	American Beauty	Nominated	
Awards Circuit Community Awards	2002	Best Ensemble	The Hours	Won	
Awards Circuit Community Awards	2011	Best Ensemble	The Help	Won	
Awards Circuit Community Awards	2017	Best Supporting Actress	I, Tonya	Won	
Astra TV Awards	2025	Best Supporting Actress in a Streaming Comedy Series	Palm Royale	Nominated	
Behind the Voice Actors Awards	2014	Best Female Vocal Performance in a Feature Film	Mr. Peabody & Sherman	Nominated	
CinEuphoria Awards	2009	Best Supporting Actress - International Competition	Away We Go	Won	
CinEuphoria Awards	2017	Best Supporting Actress - International Competition	I, Tonya	Nominated	
Dorian Awards	2018	Film Performance of the Year - Supporting Actress	I, Tonya	Nominated	
Gold Derby Awards	2003	Best Ensemble Cast	The Hours	Won	
Gold Derby Awards	2005	Best Lead Actress in a Drama Series	The West Wing	Won	
Gold Derby Awards	2008	Best Ensemble Cast	Juno	Nominated	
Gold Derby Awards	2008	Best Ensemble Cast	Hairspray	Nominated	
Gold Derby Awards	2010	Best Guest Actress in a Drama Series	Lost	Nominated	
Gold Derby Awards	2012	Best Ensemble Cast	The Help	Won	
Gold Derby Awards	2014	Best Supporting Actress in a Comedy Series	Mom	Nominated	
Gold Derby Awards	2014	Performer of the Year		Nominated	
Gold Derby Awards	2014	Best Guest Actress in a Drama Series	Masters of Sex	Won	
Gold Derby Awards	2015	Best Guest Actress in a Drama Series	Masters of Sex	Nominated	
Gold Derby Awards	2015	Best Supporting Actress in a Comedy Series	Mom	Nominated	
Gold Derby Awards	2016	Best Supporting Actress in a Comedy Series	Mom	Nominated	
Gold Derby Awards	2018	Best Supporting Actress	I, Tonya	Nominated	
Gold Derby Awards	2020	Best Supporting Actress of the decade	I, Tonya	Won	
Gold Derby Awards	2020	Best Guest Actress in a Drama Series of the decade	Masters of Sex	3rd place	
Gold Derby Awards	2020	Best Actress in a Comedy Series of the decade	Mom	2nd place	
Gold Derby Awards	2020	Best Supporting Actress in a Limited Series or TV Movie	Bad Education	Nominated	
Golden Schmoes Awards	2018	Best Supporting Actress of the Year	I, Tonya	Nominated	
Gotham Independent Film Awards	2010	Best Ensemble Performance	Life During Wartime	Nominated	
Gracie Allen Awards	2014	Outstanding Female Actor in a Supporting Role in a Comedy or Musical	Mom	Won	
Hollywood Film Awards	2007	Ensemble of the Year	Hairspray	Won	
Hollywood Film Awards	2011	Ensemble of the Year	The Help	Won	
Hollywood Film Awards	2017	Ensemble of the Year	I, Tonya	Won	
Hollywood Film Awards	2017	Supporting Actress of the Year	I, Tonya	Won	
Las Culturistas Culture Award	2025	Lifetime of Culture		Won	
Mar del Plata Film Festival	2009	Best Actress	Life During Wartime	Won	
Monte-Carlo TV Festival	2001	Outstanding Actress - Drama Series	The West Wing	Won	
National Board of Review	2011	Best Acting by an Ensemble	The Help	Won	
Palm Springs International Film Festival	2007	Ensemble Cast Award	Hairspray	Won	
Palm Springs International Film Festival	2017	Spotlight Award	I, Tonya	Won	
People's Choice Awards	2002	Favorite Dramatic Actress in a TV Series	The West Wing	Nominated	
People's Choice Awards	2003	Favorite Dramatic Actress in a TV Series	The West Wing	Nominated	
People's Choice Awards	2004	Favorite Dramatic Actress in a TV Series	The West Wing	Nominated	
People's Choice Awards	2005	Favorite Dramatic Actress in a TV Series	The West Wing	Nominated	
People's Choice Awards	2006	Favorite Dramatic Actress in a TV Series	The West Wing	Nominated	
People's Choice Awards	2014	Favorite Actress in a New TV Series	Mom	Nominated	
People's Choice Awards	2016	Favorite Comedic Actress in a TV Series	Mom	Nominated	
People's Choice Awards	2017	Favorite Comedic Actress in a TV Series	Mom	Nominated	
People's Choice Awards	2018	Female TV Star of the Year	Mom	Nominated	
People's Choice Awards	2019	Female TV Star of the Year	Mom	Nominated	
Prism Awards	2005	Performance in a TV-Movie	Our Very Own	Won	
Prism Awards	2014	Performance in a Comedy Series	Mom	Won	
Santa Barbara International Film Festival	2017	Outstanding Performance of the Year Award	I, Tonya	Won	
Satellite Awards	2001	Best Actress – Television Series Drama	The West Wing	Won	
Satellite Awards	2002	Best Actress – Television Series Drama	The West Wing	Nominated	
Satellite Awards	2012	Best Cast – Motion Picture	The Help	Won	
Satellite Awards	2018	Best Supporting Actress – Motion Picture	I, Tonya	Nominated	
TV Guide Awards	2001	Actress of the Year in a Drama Series	The West Wing	Nominated	
Viewers for Quality Television Awards	2001	Best Supporting Actress in a Quality Drama Series	The West Wing	Won	
