= Mom season 4 =

Mom
- Season 4
- DVD artwork
- Starring: Anna Faris; Allison Janney; Mimi Kennedy; Jaime Pressly; Beth Hall; William Fichtner
- No. of episodes: 22

Release
- Original network: CBS
- Original release: October 27, 2016 – May 11, 2017

Season chronology
- ← Previous; Season 3 Next → Season 5

The fourth season of the situational comedy drama Mom began airing on October 27, 2016, on CBS in the United States. The season is produced by Chuck Lorre Productions and Warner Bros. Television, with series creators Chuck Lorre, Eddie Gorodetsky and Gemma Baker serving as executive producer. The season concluded on May 11, 2017.

Christy (Anna Faris) has gone back to school and is pursuing her dream of becoming a lawyer, while Bonnie (Allison Janney) attempts to have a healthy romantic relationship with her boyfriend, Adam (William Fichtner), who was upgraded to series regular status for this season. Through it all, Christy and Bonnie rely on their support system from AA, including the wise Marjorie (Mimi Kennedy), the wealthy and sometimes misguided Jill (Jaime Pressly), and the overly emotional Wendy (Beth Hall). Collectively, they help each other stay sober in the face of whatever life throws at them. The episodes are usually titled with two odd topics that are mentioned in that episode. Season 4 marked the show's full revolution away from storylines involving Christy's children: daughter Violet (played by Sadie Calvano) only appeared in a handful of episodes, and son Roscoe (played by Blake Garrett Rosenthal) would make his final appearance ever on the show early on the season's run.

Season four of Mom aired Thursdays in the United States at 9:00 p.m. after The Great Indoors.

== Cast ==
=== Main ===
- Anna Faris as Christy Plunkett
- Allison Janney as Bonnie Plunkett
- Mimi Kennedy as Marjorie Armstrong-Perugian
- Jaime Pressly as Jill Kendall
- Beth Hall as Wendy Harris
- William Fichtner as Adam Janikowski

=== Recurring ===
- Sadie Calvano as Violet Plunkett
- Matt Jones as Baxter
- Blake Garrett Rosenthal as Roscoe
- Lauri Johnson as Beatrice
- Don McManus as Steve Casper
- Jonny Coyne as Victor Perugian
- Amy Hill as Beverly Tarantino
- Mary Pat Gleason as Mary
- Leonard Roberts as Ray Stabler
- Spencer Daniels as Luke
- Sara Rue as Candace Hayes
- Charlie Robinson as Mr. Munson
- Julia Lester as Emily

=== Special guest stars ===
- Rosie O'Donnell as Jeanine
- Bradley Whitford as Mitch
- Nicole Sullivan as Leanne
- Chris Pratt as Nick Banaszak
- Wendie Malick as Danielle Janikowski
- Missi Pyle as Natasha

=== Guest stars ===
- Chris L. McKenna as Derek
- Jennifer Taylor as Alissa
- Diane Delano as Leslie
- Mary-Pat Green as Susie
- Tim Bagley as Dr. LaSalle
- Jack McGee as Frank
- Christina Moore as Camille
- Amy Farrington as June
- David James Elliott as Joe
- Bret Harrison as Brad
- John Benjamin Hickey as Dr. Sellers
- Yeardley Smith as Enid
- David Anthony Higgins as George

== Episodes ==
No. overall	No. in season	Title	Directed by	Written by	Original release date	Prod. code	U.S. viewers (millions)
67	1	"High-tops and Brown Jacket"	James Widdoes	Story by : Chuck Lorre & Gemma Baker; Teleplay by : Marco Pennette & Adam Chase & Susan McMartin	October 27, 2016	T12.15351	7.02
Adam surprises Bonnie by returning home early. Not wanting to kick the renter out of his home yet, Adam stays at Bonnie's apartment and the two start to discover each other's personal flaws. Meanwhile, Jill agrees to play "wingman" for Christy at a different AA meeting where there are lots of attractive single men, but Jill's jealousy leads her to sabotage Christy and nearly ruptures their entire friendship. Title meaning: The shoes Christy always wears and a hot guy at the AA meeting.
68	2	"Sword Fights and a Dominican Shortstop"	James Widdoes	Story by : Chuck Lorre; Teleplay by : Gemma Baker & Warren Bell & Sheldon Bull	November 3, 2016	T12.15352	6.85
Jeanine (Rosie O'Donnell) speaks at the ladies' AA meeting and later visits with Bonnie and Christy. Upon learning that Christy is stressed over juggling two jobs, four college classes and kids, Jeanine suggests she quit school and her current jobs to work at her real estate firm. Though Christy finds the offer tempting, she ultimately decides to stay in school. Meanwhile, Adam is fascinated to learn that Bonnie had a brief lesbian relationship with Jeanine, and he has many questions. Title meaning: Adam's comment about showering with other guys and the former occupation of one of Jeanine's employees.
69	3	"Sparkling Water and Ba-dinkers"	James Widdoes	Story by : Chuck Lorre & Eddie Gorodetsky & Nick Bakay; Teleplay by : Alissa Neubauer & Anne Flett-Giordano & Britté Anchor	November 10, 2016	T12.15353	7.10
When Adam wants to get high before having sex with Bonnie, Bonnie thinks it means she has become undesirable. It turns out that something entirely different is at work. Title meaning: The drink Bonnie orders on a date with Adam and Jill's dismissive reference to part of the male genitals.
70	4	"Curious George and the Big Red Nightmare"	James Widdoes	Story by : Chuck Lorre; Teleplay by : Sheldon Bull & Adam Chase & Warren Bell	November 17, 2016	T12.15354	7.64
Christy is furious when Baxter and Candace take Roscoe home with news that they caught him smoking marijuana, and angrier when Candace says it's Christy's fault. Christy is sure Roscoe got the weed from Baxter's stash, but after Baxter falsely claims he's given it up, Bonnie later finds a way to get even with Baxter in exchange for a Hawaiian vacation. Also, Christy has a video chat with Violet who claims to be very happy with her job in Lake Tahoe, but Christy sees through it. Special guest stars: Sadie Calvano as Violet, Matt Jones as Baxter and Blake Garrett Rosenthal as Roscoe Absent: William Fichtner as Adam Title meaning: A boxed set of books Baxter bought for Candace's friend's baby shower and Christy's nickname for Candace.
71	5	"Blow and a Free McMuffin"	James Widdoes	Story by : Chuck Lorre & Susan McMartin & Anne Flett-Giordano; Teleplay by : Nick Bakay & Warren Bell	November 24, 2016	T12.15356	5.82
After rescuing a sick Violet stricken with mono, Christy and Bonnie try to get to the bottom of the story of what truly happened and find out Violet has gotten into some serious trouble. However, Violet surprises everyone by getting back together with Luke. Special guest stars: Sadie Calvano as Violet and Spencer Daniels as Luke Absent: Jaime Pressly as Jill, Beth Hall as Wendy and William Fichtner as Adam Title meaning: The reasons for which Christy has used men in the past.
72	6	"Xanax and a Baby Duck"	Jon Cryer	Story by : Chuck Lorre & Warren Bell & Sheldon Bull; Teleplay by : Eddie Gorodetsky & Gemma Baker	December 1, 2016	T12.15361	7.01
Still reeling from learning of Roscoe's using pot and drinking, Christy never lets her son out of her sight, even taking him to a meeting and later getting mad at Adam for drinking beer in front of Roscoe. Bonnie gets through to Christy via an Al-Anon meeting and Christy faces her pain and fear head-on. Special guest stars: Matt Jones as Baxter and Blake Garrett Rosenthal as Roscoe. This was Rosenthal's final appearance on the series. Title meaning: A drug Baxter says he now needs and Wendy's story about being over-protective.
73	7	"Cornbread and a Cashmere Onesie"	James Widdoes	Story by : Chuck Lorre & Gemma Baker; Teleplay by : Eddie Gorodetsky & Marco Pennette & Susan McMartin	December 8, 2016	T12.15355	7.48
On the 20th anniversary of her mother's suicide, Jill falls into a depression. Marjorie gets her out of it by making her volunteer at a soup kitchen, but the group is shocked when Jill decides she wants to have a baby. Christy tries to talk Jill out of it, but does so in a way that leads Jill to say "I never want to speak to you again." Absent: William Fichtner as Adam Title meaning: An item Bonnie serves at a soup kitchen and something Jill sees in a high-end baby catalogue.
74	8	"Freckled Bananas and a Little Schwinn"	James Widdoes	Story by : Chuck Lorre & Susan McMartin & Anne Flett-Giordano; Teleplay by : Nick Bakay & Alissa Neubauer & Britté Anchor	December 15, 2016	T12.15357	8.23
While Bonnie and Christy look for a gift for Jill, the bitchy clerk at the posh boutique subtly pokes fun at their socioeconomic status, causing Christy to steal a pair of Prada sunglasses in anger. Bonnie chastises Christy for her criminal behavior, but she then uses Adam's handicap placard to get a good parking space at a convenience store, leaving both women to make amends. Title meaning: A dollar store item Bonnie mentions and the mode of transportation for the cop who issues Bonnie a parking ticket.
75	9	"Bad Hand and British Royalty"	James Widdoes	Story by : Chuck Lorre & Nick Bakay & Warren Bell; Teleplay by : Susan McMartin & Adam Chase & Anne Flett-Giordano	January 5, 2017	T12.15359	8.50
Bonnie is excited to meet Adam's best friend Mitch (Bradley Whitford) and his wife Leanne (Nicole Sullivan) who are coming to town to visit Napa wine country. But the two turn out to be hardcore partiers and never leave Bonnie's place after getting stinking drunk. Leanne also reveals that she slept with Adam multiple times before she met Mitch, something Adam never told Bonnie. Title meaning: An excuse Mitch uses to grope Bonnie's butt and a lie Adam tells about Leanne.
76	10	"A Safe Word and a Rib Eye"	Anthony Rich	Story by : Chuck Lorre & Alissa Neubauer; Teleplay by : Eddie Gorodetsky & Gemma Baker & Marco Pennette	January 12, 2017	T12.15358	7.39
Christy is hurt to be frozen out of Jill's pregnancy news as their friendship remains sundered ahead of her birthday. A day later, Jill has a miscarriage and Christy goes to apologize but is turned away. With some help from Bonnie, Christy and Jill mend fences with each other. Absent: William Fichtner as Adam Title meaning: Bonnie's advice to Marjorie on her sex life and a midnight snack Bonnie enjoys at Jill's house.
77	11	"Good Karma and the Big Weird"	James Widdoes	Story by : Chuck Lorre & Alissa Neubauer & Susan McMartin; Teleplay by : Nick Bakay & Sheldon Bull & Adam Chase & Warren Bell	January 19, 2017	T12.15360	8.57
Christy meets a handsome man named Nick Banaszak (Chris Pratt) outside the ladies' diner, and learns that he is Marjorie's nephew. Despite Marjorie forbidding any of the women to date Nick, Christy pursues him and later regrets it because Nick is, well, a very special person. Absent: William Fichtner as Adam Title meaning: The reward Christy offers Nick for lending her parking meter change and the name she later calls Nick.
78	12	"Wind Chimes and a Bottomless Pit of Sadness"	James Widdoes	Story by : Gemma Baker & Sheldon Bull; Teleplay by : Adam Chase & Alissa Neubauer & Britté Anchor	February 2, 2017	T12.15362	8.71
Bonnie steals some cookies from Adam's place and shares them with Christy. The two become high, and later share the cookies with Jill and Wendy after an AA meeting. A panicked Adam contacts Bonnie to tell her the cookies contain marijuana, causing all of the women to worry over losing their sobriety and call Marjorie for help. Title meaning: An idea Bonnie gets while high and Jill's share at an AA meeting.
79	13	"A Bouncy Castle and an Aneurysm"	James Widdoes	Story by : Gemma Baker; Teleplay by : Eddie Gorodetsky & Marco Pennette	February 9, 2017	T12.15363	7.56
When hung-over Adam decides to spend Saturday in bed, a fed-up Bonnie goes to their scheduled wine and cheese festival alone and meets Joe (David James Elliott), a local restaurateur. The two immediately have a romantic connection, forcing Bonnie to hide the truth from Adam. Title meaning: A joke Bonnie makes about her green entrance bracelet to the festival and a lie that Christy tells Adam to cover Bonnie.
80	14	"Roast Chicken and a Funny Story"	James Widdoes	Story by : Nick Bakay & Marco Pennette & Adam Chase; Teleplay by : Alissa Neubauer & Susan McMartin & Anne Flett-Giordano	February 16, 2017	T12.15364	7.87
After Adam breaks up with her following a kiss from Joe, Bonnie finds herself in a stupor. When her attitude becomes too much for the girls to handle, Christy hopes that Adam will reconsider a future with her mother. Bonnie and Adam awkwardly resume "dating" with all sex and no communication, and Bonnie gathers her courage to tell Adam they need to stop because things are still bad between them. Title meaning: The meal Bonnie prepares for Adam and her story about the neighbor's pan she borrowed to accommodate the size of the chicken.
81	15	"Night Swimmin' and an English Muffin"	James Widdoes	Story by : Eddie Gorodetsky & Gemma Baker; Teleplay by : Chuck Lorre & Warren Bell & Sheldon Bull	February 23, 2017	T12.15365	7.62
Bonnie and Adam get back together for real, alternately having raucous sex and loud arguments. One argument is over Adam responding to a text from his ex-wife during sex, and he later admits to Bonnie that he's still trying to get his ex to sign divorce papers. Bonnie confronts the ex, Danielle (Wendie Malick), and surmises she is still hoping to get back together with Adam. Title meaning: An activity Jill would propose to her ex-husband in an attempt to win him back and a snack Bonnie has when she breaks into Danielle's house.
82	16	"Martinis and a Sponge Bath"	James Widdoes	Story by : Nick Bakay & Susan McMartin & Sheldon Bull; Teleplay by : Alissa Neubauer & Warren Bell & Adam Chase	March 9, 2017	T12.15366	7.50
Christy and Adam get into a car accident, and Bonnie's feelings are hurt when she discovers she is not the emergency contact for either of them. With Bonnie having to take care of Christy as she recovers from a concussion, she reluctantly agrees to let Danielle take care of Adam, who has a shoulder injury. Jill also puts her plans to be a foster parent to a test by (poorly) tending to Christy during her recovery. Title meaning: Two things that Danielle provides for Adam while caring for him.
83	17	"Black Mold and an Old Hot Dog"	Anthony Rich	Story by : Warren Bell & Sheldon Bull; Teleplay by : Gemma Baker & Anne Flett-Giordano & Britté Anchor	March 30, 2017	T12.15367	7.03
Despite feeling like she blew her interview with the foster system administrator, Jill gets a call that they have a child for her. Expecting an infant, Jill learns the child is a 14-year old named Emily (Julia Lester), who has bounced around the system. Meanwhile, Bonnie learns the apartment complex management has asked the tenants to give her performance reviews, so she gets to work in fixing their accurate--meaning abysmal--views of her work as the manager. Absent: William Fichtner as Adam Title meaning: Something Bonnie finds after cleaning an apartment shower and Christy's description of Bonnie as a child that has been in the foster system too long.
84	18	"Tush Push and Some Radishes"	James Widdoes	Story by : Marco Pennette & Susan McMartin; Teleplay by : Eddie Gorodetsky & Nick Bakay	April 6, 2017	T12.15368	7.50
Following the death of Shirley, Bonnie's mother, Christy and Bonnie discover that she kept a very big secret: she had a son with a different father. Bonnie is further annoyed when she meets her half-brother Ray (Leonard Roberts) and learns that he is a successful lawyer. But a tip from Jill allows Bonnie to find some peace of mind. Absent: William Fichtner as Adam; Note: Allison Janney submitted this episode for consideration due to her nomination for the Primetime Emmy Award for Outstanding Lead Actress in a Comedy Series at the 69th Primetime Emmy Awards. Title meaning: Jill's comment about Christy going to a line dance and Bonnie looking into Shirley's fridge.
85	19	"Tantric Sex and the Sprouted Flute"	James Widdoes	Story by : Eddie Gorodetsky, Nick Bakay & Gemma Baker; Teleplay by : Chuck Lorre, Sheldon Bull & Britté Anchor	April 13, 2017	T12.15369	6.84
Christy annoys everyone when she adopts her new boyfriend Brad's (Bret Harrison) healthy lifestyle, and Bonnie and Adam decide to take the next step in their relationship. Title meaning: Christy's unsatisfying sex life with Brad and the vegan restaurant they go to on their first date.
86	20	"A Cricket and a Hedge Made of Gold"	James Widdoes	Story by : Gemma Baker, Susan McMartin & Adam Chase; Teleplay by : Marco Pennette, Alissa Neubauer & Anne Flett-Giordano	April 27, 2017	T12.15370	7.06
When Marjorie takes a break from the group, Bonnie becomes the go-to for everyone's problems. Christy is hit by emotional trauma when she recognizes a new AA member as the man who once raped her. Absent: William Fichtner as Adam Title meaning: An unwanted house pest that keeps bugging Christy and Bonnie's joke on the reason why Marjorie's sponsor relapsed.
87	21	"A Few Thongs and a Hawaiian Funeral"	James Widdoes	Story by : Gemma Baker & Marco Pennette; Teleplay by : Alissa Neubauer & Adam Chase & Anne Flett-Giordano	May 4, 2017	T12.15371	8.18
Christy and Jill take Emily to meet her biological mother Natasha (Missi Pyle) in a rehab facility. Christy is shocked when she sees Natasha, remembering her from her days as a stripper, and starts helping Natasha deal with her large array of self-inflicted problems. Meanwhile, Bonnie has to take care of Adam's ageing dog while he attends a funeral in Hawaii. Title meaning: Bonnie asking Jill to pick up the bill at a lingerie store and her shock as to why Adam has to leave town.
88	22	"Lockjaw and a Liquid Diet"	James Widdoes	Story by : Susan McMartin & Sheldon Bull; Teleplay by : Eddie Gorodetsky & Nick Bakay	May 11, 2017	T12.15372	8.12
Bonnie learns that the IRS has tracked her down and is demanding $18,000 in unpaid taxes. After dismissing Adam's offer to pay the debt, Bonnie tries to hire Steve Casper, then asks Christy to represent her. They eventually go to Bonnie's half-brother Ray for help. After Ray is able to work out a deal with the IRS, he states to Bonnie, Christy and their friends that he has a cocaine addiction; they respond with an outpouring of support. Title meaning: A condition Bonnie might have after "paying back" Adam for a loan and the weight loss program her IRS auditor is currently on.

== Ratings ==
Viewership and ratings per episode of Mom season 4
No.	Title	Air date	Rating/share (18–49)	Viewers (millions)
1	"High-Tops and Brown Jacket"	October 27, 2016	1.5/5	7.02
2	"Sword Fights and a Dominican Shortstop"	November 3, 2016	1.3/5	6.85
3	"Sparkling Water and Ba-Dinkers"	November 10, 2016	1.5/5	7.10
4	"Curious George and the Big Red Nightmare"	November 17, 2016	1.4/5	7.64
5	"Blow and a Free McMuffin"	November 24, 2016	1.2/4	5.82
6	"Xanax and a Baby Duck"	December 1, 2016	1.3/5	7.01
7	"Cornbread and a Cashmere Onesie"	December 8, 2016	1.4/5	7.48
8	"Freckled Bananas and a Little Schwinn"	December 15, 2016	1.5/5	8.23
9	"Bad Hand and British Royalty"	January 5, 2017	1.7/6	8.50
10	"A Safe Word and a Rib Eye"	January 12, 2017	1.3/5	7.39
11	"Good Karma and the Big Weird"	January 19, 2017	1.7/6	8.57
12	"Wind Chimes and a Bottomless Pit of Sadness"	February 2, 2017	1.6/5	8.71
13	"A Bouncy Castle and an Aneurysm"	February 9, 2017	1.5/5	7.56
14	"Roast Chicken and a Funny Story"	February 16, 2017	1.5/5	7.87
15	"Night Swimmin' and an English Muffin"	February 23, 2017	1.4/5	7.62
16	"Martinis and a Sponge Bath"	March 9, 2017	1.4/5	7.50
17	"Black Mold and an Old Hot Dog"	March 30, 2017	1.2/5	7.03
18	"Tush Push and Some Radishes"	April 6, 2017	1.4/6	7.50
19	"Tantric Sex and the Sprouted Flute"	April 13, 2017	1.3/5	6.84
20	"A Cricket and a Hedge Made of Gold"	April 27, 2017	1.3/5	7.06
21	"A Few Thongs and a Hawaiian Funeral"	May 4, 2017	1.5/6	8.18
22	"Lockjaw and a Liquid Diet"	May 11, 2017	1.5/6	8.12
