= Mom season 3 =

Mom
- Season 3
- DVD artwork
- Starring: Anna Faris; Allison Janney; Sadie Calvano; Matt Jones; Blake Garrett Rosenthal; Mimi Kennedy; Jaime Pressly; Beth Hall
- No. of episodes: 22

Release
- Original network: CBS
- Original release: November 5, 2015 – May 19, 2016

Season chronology
- ← Previous; Season 2 Next → Season 4

The third season of the television comedy drama series Mom began airing on November 5, 2015, on CBS in the United States. The season is produced by Chuck Lorre Productions and Warner Bros. Television, with series creators Chuck Lorre, Eddie Gorodetsky and Gemma Baker serving as executive producer.

The series follows Christy Plunkett (Anna Faris), a single mother who—after dealing with her battle with alcoholism and drug addiction—decides to restart her life in Napa, California's wine country working as a waitress at the restaurant Rustic Fig and attending Alcoholics Anonymous meetings. She lives with her mother Bonnie Plunkett (Allison Janney), who is also a recovering drug and alcohol addict, as well as her teenage daughter Violet (Sadie Calvano), who was born when Christy was 16years. Christy also has a younger son Roscoe (Blake Garrett Rosenthal) by her deadbeat ex-husband Baxter (Matt Jones). Other prominent character in the series is the wise Marjorie (Mimi Kennedy), Christy and Bonnie's friend and co-Alcoholics Anonymous member. Jaime Pressly and Beth Hall, who play co-Alcoholics Anonymous members Jill and Wendy, respectively, were upgraded to series regular status for this season. The episodes are usually titled with two odd topics that are mentioned in that episode.

Season three of Mom aired Thursdays in the United States at 9:00 p.m. after Life in Pieces in the fall and The Odd Couple in spring.

The season received positive reviews from critics and Allison Janney was nominated a Primetime Emmy Award for her performance.

== Cast ==
=== Main ===
- Anna Faris as Christy Plunkett
- Allison Janney as Bonnie Plunkett
- Sadie Calvano as Violet Plunkett
- Matt Jones as Baxter
- Blake Garrett Rosenthal as Roscoe
- Mimi Kennedy as Marjorie Armstrong-Perugian
- Jaime Pressly as Jill Kendall
- Beth Hall as Wendy Harris

=== Recurring ===
- Sara Rue as Candace Hayes
- William Fichtner as Adam Janikowski
- Emily Osment as Jodi Hubbard
- Don McManus as Steve Casper
- Lauri Johnson as Beatrice
- David Krumholtz as Gregory Munchnik
- Amy Hill as Beverly Tarantino
- Octavia Spencer as Regina Tompkins
- French Stewart as Chef Rudy
- Reggie De Leon as Paul
- Courtney Henggeler as Claudia
- Jonny Coyne as Victor Perugian
- Charlie Robinson as Mr. Munson
- Mary Pat Gleason as Mary

=== Special guest stars ===
- Ellen Burstyn as Shirley Stabler
- June Squibb as Dottie
- Judy Greer as Michelle
- Linda Lavin as Phyllis Munchnik
- Harry Hamlin as Fred Hayes
- Rosie O'Donnell as Jeanine
- Joe Manganiello as Julian
- Rhea Perlman as Anya Perugian
- Richard Schiff as Robert

=== Guest stars ===
- Sonya Eddy as Angela
- Tricia O'Kelley as Mrs. Lippert
- Lamont Thompson as Marcus
- Alec Mapa as Milo
- Jean St. James as Tricia
- David Mattey as Pierre
- Sammy Aaron as Craig
- Sean T. Krishnan as Dr. Patel
- Jesse Luken as Travis Sullivan
- Steven Boyer as Dave
- George Paez as Ramone
- Simon Stilens as Wazka Discor
- Stacey Travis as Deborah
- Nick Toth as Richard Pleppler

== Episodes ==
No. overall	No. in season	Title	Directed by	Written by	Original release date	Prod. code	U.S. viewers (millions)
45	1	"Terrorists and Gingerbread"	James Widdoes	Story by : Chuck Lorre & Marco Pennette; Teleplay by : Gemma Baker & Adam Chase & Anne Flett-Giordano	November 5, 2015	4X7053	7.28
Christy and Bonnie have different ideas about forgiveness when Bonnie's birth mother Shirley (Ellen Burstyn), who abandoned her as a small child, suddenly seeks them out, wanting to be a part of their lives. Title meaning: Bonnie's made-up story about how her birth mother "died", and Christy's first impression of an elderly woman (June Squibb) she mistakes for Shirley.
46	2	"Thigh Gap and a Rack of Lamb"	James Widdoes	Story by : Chuck Lorre & Marco Pennette; Teleplay by : Gemma Baker & Adam Chase & Anne Flett-Giordano	November 12, 2015	4X7052	7.16
Sensing a shadow of their former selves, Christy and Bonnie try to help Jodi (Emily Osment), a teenage addict they met at their meeting. Meanwhile, Christy ends up getting fired from her manager position after asking Claudia for a raise, and is forced to return to waitressing. The episode ends with a To Be Continued screen. Title meaning: Bonnie slimming down from cycling and jogging and Christy's last defiant theft from the restaurant.
47	3	"Mozzarella Sticks and a Gay Piano Bar"	James Widdoes	Story by : Chuck Lorre & Nick Bakay & Marco Pennette; Teleplay by : Gemma Baker & Sheldon Bull & Adam Chase	November 19, 2015	4X7056	7.46
Christy and Bonnie take Jodi in and help her get on her feet: after three months, when they return her to her sister, they decide to continue helping other struggling alcoholics, but their first rescue, Michelle (Judy Greer), becomes more problematic than they had anticipated when she sobers up. Title meaning: A sports bar where Christy and Bonnie find Michelle and the impression left by Michelle's drunken performance of "Bohemian Rhapsody".
48	4	"Sawdust and Brisket"	James Widdoes	Story by : Chuck Lorre & Nick Bakay; Teleplay by : Sheldon Bull & Susan McMartin & Sam Miller	November 26, 2015	4X7051	6.72
Christy is overjoyed when Violet asks for the chance to repair their relationship, but things start to go wrong when Christy accidentally reveals Violet's past pregnancy to her fiancé Gregory (David Krumholtz). Meanwhile, Bonnie tries to end the old feud between her and her nemesis Beverly (Amy Hill). Title meaning: Bonnie's impotence-themed dig at Gregory and her and Christy coming to dinner at Gregory and Violet's.
49	5	"A Pirate, Three Frogs and a Prince"	James Widdoes	Story by : Chuck Lorre & Warren Bell; Teleplay by : Eddie Gorodetsky & Alissa Neubauer & Michael Borkow	December 10, 2015	4X7055	6.87
Christy becomes paranoid and jealous when Baxter's girlfriend Candace starts acting more like a mother to Roscoe, which only gets worse when Baxter reveals his intentions to marry her. Meanwhile, Bonnie is trying to start dating again, so she sets her sights on fellow AA member Steve (Don McManus), the lawyer that Christy works for. Title meaning: Bonnie's comments on Steve's looks and Candace's making costumes for Roscoe's school play.
50	6	"Horny-Goggles and a Catered Intervention"	James Widdoes	Story by : Susan McMartin; Teleplay by : Chuck Lorre, Nick Bakay & Sheldon Bull	December 17, 2015	4X7054	8.95
Christy and Bonnie aren't sure how to handle things when Regina (Octavia Spencer) begins drinking moderately, and even more so when Regina's life keeps getting better outside of any association with AA. Title meaning: Bonnie's desperate glances at a waiter and an intervention thrown for Regina by Jill.
51	7	"Kreplach and a Tiny Tush"	Anthony Rich	Story by : Eddie Gorodetsky, Adam Chase & Warren Bell; Teleplay by : Chuck Lorre, Marco Pennette & Alissa Neubauer	January 7, 2016	4X7059	8.71
While Bonnie struggles to move forward in her relationship with Steve, Christy has trouble establishing boundaries with her mentees, who incessantly keep trying to get in touch with her. Naturally, these problems come to light, as the family tries to host a traditional Shabbat dinner for Violet's judgmental future mother-in-law, Phyllis (Linda Lavin). Title meaning: The Jewish food Christy prepares for the occasion and Phyllis' admiration of Christy's quite nice butt.
52	8	"Snickerdoodle and a Nip Slip"	James Widdoes	Story by : Chuck Lorre & Warren Bell; Teleplay by : Eddie Gorodetsky & Alissa Neubauer	January 14, 2016	4X7057	8.33
Now that she is engaged to Baxter, Candace suggests a lunch at the golf club with Christy and Bonnie to ease the friction between them. The three seem to get along for once, when Candace's wealthy father Fred (Harry Hamlin) stops by the table and takes an interest in Christy, which thrills Bonnie but angers Candace. The episode ends with a To Be Continued screen. Title meaning: Fred's pet name for Candace and Bonnie's slipping on a nipple pastie under her rented shoe.
53	9	"My Little Pony and a Demerol Drip"	James Widdoes	Story by : Chuck Lorre, Nick Bakay & Sheldon Bull; Teleplay by : Gemma Baker, Marco Pennette & Adam Chase	January 21, 2016	4X7058	8.49
Christy and Fred's future together is in jeopardy after Christy is put off by how Fred treats Candace, even though she still dislikes Baxter's betrothed. Meanwhile, Bonnie revels in the fact that her daughter is dating a wealthy man. Title meaning: Christy's childhood toy and Bonnie's explanation of how Fred treats Candace.
54	10	"Quaaludes and Crackerjack"	James Widdoes	Story by : Chuck Lorre, Sheldon Bull & Susan McMartin; Teleplay by : Nick Bakay & Warren Bell	February 4, 2016	4X7061	7.96
Bonnie wants to go to a different AA meeting because she thinks Steve keeps looking at her funny. She and Christy attend a meeting geared to the LGBT community where Bonnie runs into Christy's "Aunt" Jeanine (Rosie O'Donnell), a lesbian that Bonnie lived with (and slept with) for two years when she was desperate for a home. Title meaning: Drugs that Jeanine provided for Bonnie when they were living together and Jeanine's pet name for Christy.
55	11	"Cinderella and a Drunk MacGyver"	James Widdoes	Story by : Chuck Lorre, Eddie Gorodetsky & Nick Bakay; Teleplay by : Alissa Neubauer, Warren Bell & Susan McMartin	February 11, 2016	4X7060	8.13
Christy tries to help a recently sober man named Julian (Joe Manganiello) get back on his feet, but finds her attraction to him impairing her best intentions. Meanwhile, Bonnie accompanies Jill to a charity gala that the latter says was once the highlight of her year, only to find when they arrive that the guests are not so quick to forget Jill's past alcohol-induced behavior. Title meaning: Bonnie's reason for why Christy could not go to the gala and Christy's explanation of how she used to put alcohol in her shampoo bottles.
56	12	"Diabetic Lesbians and a Blushing Bride"	James Widdoes	Story by : Chuck Lorre, Marco Pennette, Adam Chase & Anne Flett-Giordano; Teleplay by : Eddie Gorodetsky, Gemma Baker & Alissa Neubauer	February 18, 2016	4X7062	8.68
Jodi tells Bonnie and Christy she is dating a fellow addict who is only six weeks clean, which worries the women. Marjorie announces she will marry Victor (Jonny Coyne), and that the wedding is in a week because they want it done before they go on vacation together. The girls, including Jodi, hold a bachelorette party for Marjorie, where they try to get Victor's sister Anya (Rhea Perlman) to like her. Jodi does not show up for the wedding ceremony, and Christy later gets a call from the police telling her that Jodi has died from a drug overdose, leaving her and the other friends shocked and in tears. Note: due its themes at the end a public service announcement featuring Faris, Janney and a doctor talking about drug overdosing aired after the episode first aired. Title meaning: Bonnie's comment about a phallic cake and Marjorie getting married.
57	13	"Sticky Hands and a Walk on the Wild Side"	James Widdoes	Story by : Chuck Lorre, Eddie Gorodetsky & Susan McMartin; Teleplay by : Nick Bakay, Warren Bell & Anne Flett-Giordano	February 25, 2016	4X7063	7.90
As the ladies try to process Jodi's death, Marjorie is furious that Christy didn't tell her about it until she returned from her honeymoon. Meanwhile, Bonnie convinces Christy, Wendy and Jill they can make a huge profit smuggling a barrel of pure maple syrup back from Canada. Title meaning: The dangers of transporting maple syrup and Christy's comment about being in Canada.
58	14	"Death, Death, Death and a Bucket of Chicken"	James Widdoes	Story by : Chuck Lorre, Warren Bell & Anne Flett-Giordano; Teleplay by : Gemma Baker & Alissa Neubauer	March 3, 2016	4X7065	7.98
Bonnie has a health scare when Steve sees a suspicious mole on her buttock during sex. A doctor removes it for a biopsy, but tells Bonnie and Christy the results will take a week. Fearing the worst, Bonnie starts making a bucket list of things she has never done "while sober". This includes agreeing to marry Steve. When the doctor says the mole was cancerous but he was able to remove it all, Bonnie nixes the engagement. Title meaning: Why Bonnie can't sleep and the food she asks Christy to pick up on her way home.
59	15	"Nazi Zombies and a Two-Hundred Pound Baby"	James Widdoes	Story by : Chuck Lorre & Susan McMartin; Teleplay by : Adam Chase & Anne Flett-Giordano	March 10, 2016	4X7066	7.88
Christy finds herself being attracted to Baxter again, especially after he complains about his upcoming wedding to Candace. Christy takes in a movie and ice cream with Baxter and Roscoe, where Baxter talks about how nice it would be if the three were a family again. Bonnie warns Christy that Baxter is a better man mainly because of Candace's influence, and that he'd turn back into his old self if he was with Christy. Title meaning: Roscoe's video game and Baxter's hairless body.
60	16	"Cornflakes and the Hair of Three Men"	James Widdoes	Story by : Chuck Lorre & Britté Anchor; Teleplay by : Marco Pennette & Susan McMartin	April 7, 2016	4X7064	7.17
When Christy is laid off from the restaurant, Jill offers her a job as a personal assistant and companion, but things get out of hand when Christy can't stop pushing for details about Jill's personal life. Meanwhile, a wrong number results in Bonnie developing a sudden friendship with an unknown man, but when they finally decide to meet in person, he loses his nerve and disappears...in a wheelchair. First appearance of: William Fichtner as Adam Title meaning: Flirtatious comments shared between Bonnie and her mysterious man over the phone.
61	17	"Caperberries and a Glass Eye"	Anthony Rich	Story by : Chuck Lorre & Eddie Gorodetsky; Teleplay by : Sheldon Bull & Warren Bell	April 14, 2016	4X7067	7.46
After Adam (William Fichtner) explains over the phone why he backed out on their first date, Bonnie gives him another chance. They have a great time on their first real date and plan to see each other again – until Christy soon learns from a colleague that Adam was notorious for cheating on his girlfriends, and she doesn't know how to break the news to Bonnie. Title meaning: A dinner date Adam prepares for Bonnie and Jill's confession about a handicapped ex-boyfriend.
62	18	"Beast Mode and Old People Kissing"	James Widdoes	Story by : Chuck Lorre & Nick Bakay; Teleplay by : Gemma Baker, Adam Chase & Warren Bell	April 21, 2016	4X7068	8.31
Travis (Jesse Luken), the boyfriend who did drugs with Jodi when she died, shows up at a meeting. An angry Christy confronts him, driving him away. Marjorie and Bonnie convince Christy that Jodi's addiction killed her, not Travis, so Christy makes her amends. Meanwhile, Adam can't understand why Bonnie needs to go to AA meetings so often, until Bonnie shows him a videotape of her drunken antics at Christy and Baxter's wedding. Title meaning: How mean Christy can be when she's angry and her comment about Bonnie and Adam.
63	19	"A Catheter and a Dipsy-Doodle"	James Widdoes	Story by : Chuck Lorre, Alissa Neubauer & Sheldon Bull; Teleplay by : Nick Bakay, Marco Pennette, Anne Flett-Giordano & Susan McMartin	April 28, 2016	4X7069	8.27
Adam is embarrassed to tell Bonnie he doesn't want to go to a reunion of his old film crew colleagues, because he's afraid they will just show pity on him. She convinces him to go, and while there, Adam is offered a job as stunt coordinator for a new movie – but the filming will be done in Croatia. Meanwhile, Christy is hospitalized with pneumonia (and terrified of Wendy's angry, authoritative behavior as an ER nurse) but resolves to get to her pre-law final exam even if it kills her. Special guest star: French Stewart as Chef Rudy Title meaning: Wendy's threat to Christy and Bonnie's suspicion over Adam's behaviour.
64	20	"Pure Evil and a Free Piece of Cheesecake"	James Widdoes	Story by : Chuck Lorre, Gemma Baker & Warren Bell; Teleplay by : Britté Anchor	May 5, 2016	4X7070	7.92
Christy is ecstatic over passing her finals with straight As and making the dean's list, but Bonnie goes out of her way to insult and belittle Christy's achievements and things get ugly between them until Bonnie sort of apologizes for being jealous. Title meaning: Christy insulting Bonnie at a meeting and the restaurant's celebratory gift for Christy's finals.
65	21	"Mahjong Sally and the Ecstasy"	James Widdoes	Story by : Chuck Lorre, Eddie Gorodetsky & Warren Bell; Teleplay by : Alissa Neubauer & Susan McMartin	May 12, 2016	4X7071	8.31
When a tearful Violet returns home after having both her heart and engagement broken, Christy goes to confront Gregory, but she comes to realize that Violet might be the one with the problem. Title meaning: Bonnie's insulting nickname for Phyllis and Phyllis' mention of Violet's addictions.
66	22	"Atticus Finch and the Downtrodden"	James Widdoes	Story by : Chuck Lorre, Nick Bakay & Sheldon Bull; Teleplay by : Gemma Baker, Adam Chase & Anne Flett-Giordano	May 19, 2016	4X7072	8.14
When Christy's hard realities regarding college costs and her daughter's broken engagement and marijuana use begin overwhelming her, Bonnie attempts to make some quick money re-selling items (clearing out Jill's over-stocked garage in the process). Christy faces her fears by presenting her case at a scholarship award meeting – and tries to finally have a happy birthday. Title meaning: Christy's reference to To Kill A Mockingbird and her reasons for becoming a lawyer.

== Reception ==
=== Ratings ===
Viewership and ratings per episode of Mom season 3
No.	Title	Air date	Rating/share (18–49)	Viewers (millions)
1	"Terrorists and Gingerbread"	November 5, 2015	1.5/5	7.28
2	"Thigh Gap and a Rack of Lamb"	November 12, 2015	1.5/5	7.16
3	"Mozzarella Sticks and a Gay Piano Bar"	November 19, 2015	1.7/5	7.46
4	"Sawdust and Brisket"	November 26, 2015	1.7/6	6.72
5	"A Pirate, Three Frogs and a Prince"	December 10, 2015	1.6/6	6.87
6	"Horny-Goggles and a Catered Intervention"	December 17, 2015	1.8/6	8.95
7	"Kreplach and a Tiny Tush"	January 7, 2016	1.8/6	8.71
8	"Snickerdoodle and a Nip Slip"	January 14, 2016	1.7/5	8.33
9	"My Little Pony and a Demerol Drip"	January 21, 2016	1.7/6	8.49
10	"Quaaludes and Crackerjack"	February 4, 2016	1.7/6	7.96
11	"Cinderella and a Drunk MacGyver"	February 11, 2016	1.8/6	8.13
12	"Diabetic Lesbians and a Blushing Bride"	February 18, 2016	1.8/6	8.68
13	"Sticky Hands and a Walk on the Wild Side"	February 25, 2016	1.8/6	7.90
14	"Death, Death, Death and a Bucket of Chicken"	March 3, 2016	1.7/6	7.98
15	"Nazi Zombies and a Two-Hundred Pound Baby"	March 10, 2016	1.7/6	7.88
16	"Cornflakes and the Hair of Three Men"	April 7, 2016	1.5/5	7.17
17	"Caperberries and a Glass Eye"	April 14, 2016	1.5/5	7.46
18	"Beast Mode and Old People Kissing"	April 21, 2016	1.8/6	8.31
19	"A Catheter and a Dipsy-Doodle"	April 28, 2016	1.7/6	8.27
20	"Pure Evil and a Free Piece of Cheesecake"	May 5, 2016	1.5/6	7.92
21	"Mahjong Sally and the Ecstasy"	May 12, 2016	1.8/6	8.31
22	"Atticus Finch and the Downtrodden"	May 19, 2016	1.7/6	8.14

=== Critical response ===
Review aggregator website Rotten Tomatoes reports that 100% of nine critics gave this season a positive review; the average rating is 8.33/10. The season averaged 82 out of 100, based on four critics, on Metacritic, indicating "universal acclaim".

=== Accolades ===
Year	Award	Category	Recipient	Result	Ref.
2016	Primetime Emmy Awards	Outstanding Supporting Actress in a Comedy Series	Allison Janney	Nominated	
2016	Primetime Emmy Awards	Outstanding Cinematography for a Multi-Camera Series	Steven V. Silver	Nominated	
2016	Primetime Emmy Awards	Outstanding Multi-Camera Picture Editing for a Comedy Series	Ben Bosse and Joseph Bella	Nominated	
