= Mom season 2 =

Mom
- Season 2
- DVD artwork
- Starring: Anna Faris; Allison Janney; Sadie Calvano; Nate Corddry; Matt Jones; French Stewart; Mimi Kennedy; Blake Garrett Rosenthal
- No. of episodes: 22

Release
- Original network: CBS
- Original release: October 30, 2014 – April 30, 2015

Season chronology
- ← Previous; Season 1 Next → Season 3

The second season of the television comedy drama series Mom ran on CBS in the United States from October 30, 2014, to April 30, 2015. The season was produced by Chuck Lorre Productions and Warner Bros. Television, with series creators Chuck Lorre, Eddie Gorodetsky and Gemma Baker serving as executive producers.

The series follows Christy Plunkett (Anna Faris), a single mother who, after dealing with her battle with alcoholism and drug addiction, decides to restart her life in Napa, California's wine country, working as a waitress at the restaurant Rustic Fig and attending Alcoholics Anonymous meetings. She lives with her mother, Bonnie Plunkett (Allison Janney), who is also a recovering drug and alcohol addict, as well as her teenage daughter, Violet (Sadie Calvano), who was born when Christy was 17. Christy also has a younger son, Roscoe (Blake Garrett Rosenthal), by her deadbeat ex-husband, Baxter (Matt Jones). Other prominent characters in the series include the manager of Rustic Fig, Gabriel (Nate Corddry) and the head chef, Rudy (French Stewart). Mimi Kennedy, who plays the wise Marjorie, Christy and Bonnie's friend and co-Alcoholics Anonymous member, was upgraded to series regular status for this season. The episodes are usually titled with two odd topics mentioned in that episode.

Season two of Mom initially aired on Thursdays in the United States at 8:30 p.m. after The Big Bang Theory, but it has aired in other time slots on the same night at various points of the season.

== Cast ==
=== Main ===
- Anna Faris as Christy Plunkett
- Allison Janney as Bonnie Plunkett
- Sadie Calvano as Violet Plunkett
- Matt Jones as Baxter
- Nate Corddry as Gabriel
- French Stewart as Chef Rudy
- Mimi Kennedy as Marjorie Armstrong
- Blake Garrett Rosenthal as Roscoe

=== Recurring ===
- Kevin Pollak as Alvin Lester Biletnikoff
- Jaime Pressly as Jill Kendall
- Beth Hall as Wendy Harris
- Reggie De Leon as Paul
- Octavia Spencer as Regina Tompkins
- Jonny Coyne as Victor Perugian
- Don McManus as Steve Casper
- David Krumholtz as Gregory Munchnik
- Spencer Daniels as Luke
- Sara Rue as Candace Hayes
- Courtney Henggeler as Claudia
- Amy Hill as Beverly Tarantino
- Charlie Robinson as Mr. Munson
- Mary Pat Gleason as Mary
- Ryan Cartwright as Jeff Taylor
- Melissa Tang as Suzanne Taylor

=== Special guest stars ===
- Ed Asner as Jack Bumgartner
- Beverly D'Angelo as Lorraine Biletnikoff
- Colin Hanks as Andy Dreeson

=== Guest stars ===
- Crista Flanagan as Beth
- Richard Riehle as John
- Rick Fox as James Kendall
- Mark Saul as Cooper
- Alan Rachins as Jed
- Clark Duke as Jackie Biletnikoff
- Chris Smith as Douglas Biletnikoff
- Toby Huss as Bill
- April Bowlby as Selene
- George Paez as Ramone
- John Charles Meyer as Jesus
- Fred Tatasciore as Voice of Canister
- Tom Amandes as Richard
- Kelly Stables as Kathy

== Episodes ==
No. overall	No. in season	Title	Directed by	Written by	Original release date	Prod. code	U.S. viewers (millions)
23	1	"Hepatitis and Lemon Zest"	Ted Wass	Story by : Chuck Lorre & Eddie Gorodetsky; Teleplay by : Nick Bakay & Gemma Baker & Marco Pennette	October 30, 2014	4X6701	11.13
Christy starts having recurring nightmares about relapsing and on Marjorie's advice takes new attendee Jill (Jaime Pressly) under her wing. When Bonnie learns from the landlord that Christy is three months behind on rent, Christy admits she gambled away what little money they had trying to win enough to pay rent. Bonnie and Marjorie come up with enough money for one month's rent to keep the landlord at bay, but Christy, hearing Chef Rudy place a bet on a college football game, can't resist trying to multiply one month's rent into three months' rent: she wins her bet, but gets mugged after cashing in, forcing the family out of the house and into a motel. First appearance of: Jaime Pressly as Jill; Absent: Matt Jones as Baxter Title meaning: Christy spreads a rumour about a rival waitress and has to endure Chef Rudy's taunts.
24	2	"Figgy Pudding and the Rapture"	Ted Wass	Story by : Chuck Lorre & Susan McMartin; Teleplay by : Alissa Neubauer & Sheldon Bull & Adam Chase	November 6, 2014	4X6702	10.80
The family becomes essentially homeless, after an incident in the motel room two doors down drives them out. Alvin goes to visit Christy at the old house and finds it abandoned, except for Baxter who is using the shower. The landlord shows up and says Christy fled in the middle of the night, which irritates Alvin and leads him to angrily castigate Christy. Special guest star: Spencer Daniels as Luke Title meaning: Bonnie makes a sarcastic prayer and Baxter's deluded explanation for finding Christy's house empty.
25	3	"Chicken Nuggets and a Triple Homicide"	Ted Wass	Story by : Chuck Lorre & Mike Binder; Teleplay by : Eddie Gorodetsky & Alissa Neubauer & Adam Chase	November 13, 2014	4X6703	11.07
Christy and Bonnie meet a woman at an AA meeting who rents them a beautiful house in the country at a ridiculous discount. After avoiding the issue, the realtor finally admits that three people and a dog were murdered in the house, and the atmosphere in the house becomes increasingly scary for everyone inside it. Meanwhile, Bonnie plays mediator between Alvin and Christy, as well as the two eventually make up. Absent: Nate Corddry as Gabriel and French Stewart as Chef Rudy Title meaning: Christy brings fast food home for Roscoe and the rented house's history as a murder scene.
26	4	"Forged Resumes and the Recommended Dosage"	Ted Wass	Story by : Chuck Lorre & Nick Bakay; Teleplay by : Gemma Baker & Sheldon Bull & Marco Pennette	November 20, 2014	4X6704	10.19
Christy worries when Violet's behaviour starts mirroring her own from her drinking days. She reminds Violet that the reason she gave up her baby was to commit herself to school and build a future, but Violet says she can't do that while not knowing if her baby is safe. The two visit the Taylors and Violet sees that her child is being well cared for, also accepting she no longer has any excuses to not make something of her life. Meanwhile, Bonnie tries unsuccessfully to lie her way into several jobs before finally getting one as a building manager, which also will provide the family with a free apartment. Absent: Nate Corddry as Gabriel, Matt Jones as Baxter and French Stewart as Chef Rudy Title meaning: Bonnie's series of unsuccessful job interviews and Christy's allergies to Marjorie's cats.
27	5	"Kimchi and a Monkey Playing Harmonica"	Ted Wass	Story by : Chuck Lorre & Eddie Gorodetsky; Teleplay by : Susan McMartin & Sheldon Bull & Marco Pennette	November 27, 2014	4X6705	7.30
Christy has ambivalent feelings about Baxter's new wealthy girlfriend Candace (Sara Rue), which start to turn negative when Roscoe starts bragging about all the things Candace gives him that Christy cannot. Meanwhile, Bonnie and Alvin's relationship begins to heat up, but a conversation with Marjorie convinces Bonnie that she should slow things down. Absent: Sadie Calvano as Violet, Nate Corddry as Gabriel and French Stewart as Chef Rudy Title meaning: Baxter begins learning Korean for an overseas job and Bonnie discovers an internet meme on YouTube while settling into her new job as building manager.
28	6	"Crazy Eyes and a Wet Brad Pitt"	Ted Wass	Story by : Gemma Baker & Alissa Neubauer & Adam Chase; Teleplay by : Chuck Lorre & Nick Bakay	December 4, 2014	4X6706	8.61
Bonnie and Christy are catapulted into the lap of luxury when Jill, Christy's wealthy sponsee, asks them to keep her company in her expensive home during her recent release from rehab, but they soon discover that Jill's frequent relapses might be too much for them to handle. Absent: Nate Corddry as Gabriel, Matt Jones as Baxter and French Stewart as Chef Rudy Title meaning: Jill's erratic behaviour towards Christy and Bonnie watching a movie in Jill's home theatre.
29	7	"Soapy Eyes and a Clean Slate"	Ted Wass	Story by : Chuck Lorre & Alissa Neubauer; Teleplay by : Gemma Baker & Marco Pennette & Adam Chase	December 11, 2014	4X6707	10.75
While trying to right some of her past wrongs, Christy takes a lot of frustration out on Baxter until Violet helps her realize that despite his faults, Baxter was there for her and Roscoe when Christy couldn't be. Taking a cue from her daughter, Bonnie tries to come clean with Alvin about her own past. Title meaning: Bonnie attends to a tenant's apartment and her confessions to Alvin about her past.
30	8	"Free Therapy and a Dead Lady's Yard Sale"	Ted Wass	Story by : Chuck Lorre & Susan McMartin; Teleplay by : Gemma Baker & Marco Pennette & Adam Chase	December 18, 2014	4X6708	10.01
When Bonnie and Christy find out Violet cheated on Luke, they are worried about her and eventually (with a separate assist from Baxter) get her to see a therapist at a free clinic, where Violet's anger towards Christy leads Bonnie to tell Violet that her idealized biological father regularly abused Christy. Christy lies about the man's fate but tells the truth of how he beat her, shocking Violet. Special guest star: Spencer Daniels as Luke Absent: Nate Corddry as Gabriel, French Stewart as Chef Rudy and Mimi Kennedy as Marjorie Title meaning: The therapist at the free clinic and Bonnie's dealing with the death of a tenant.
31	9	"Godzilla and a Sprig of Mint"	Ted Wass	Story by : Chuck Lorre & Nick Bakay; Teleplay by : Eddie Gorodetsky & Alissa Neubauer & Sheldon Bull	January 8, 2015	4X6709	12.29
Christy's evening alone takes an unexpected turn when she meets her attractive, single neighbor, Andy (Colin Hanks) who seems perfect until he reveals a really weird personal quirk. Also, Bonnie and Alvin's romantic plans are derailed by Alvin's ex-wife, Lorraine (Beverly D'Angelo), who claims to want a reconciliation. Absent: Nate Corddry as Gabriel, Matt Jones as Baxter, French Stewart as Chef Rudy and Blake Garrett Rosenthal as Roscoe Title meaning: Alvin's nickname for Lorraine and his dinner date with Bonnie.
32	10	"Nudes and a Six Day Cleanse"	Jeff Greenstein	Story by : Alissa Neubauer & Sheldon Bull & Susan McMartin; Teleplay by : Marco Pennette & Adam Chase & Gemma Baker	January 15, 2015	4X6710	10.84
After realizing she's been a waitress longer than she planned, Christy takes steps towards a new career. Taking advantage of a chance encounter in her AA group, she agrees to intern for a competent but creepy lawyer she met in AA. Also, Bonnie and Alvin try to recapture their youth. Absent: Nate Corddry as Gabriel, Matt Jones as Baxter, French Stewart as Chef Rudy and Mimi Kennedy as Marjorie Title meaning: A case file Christy handles and her reprimand from Violet.
33	11	"Three Smiles and an Unpainted Ceiling"	Anthony Rich	Story by : Chuck Lorre & Eddie Gorodetsky; Teleplay by : Chuck Lorre & Eddie Gorodetsky & Nick Bakay	January 22, 2015	4X6711	11.05
Just as Alvin and Bonnie take a big step toward a committed relationship, with Alvin moving into the apartment across the courtyard, his unexpected death rocks the Plunkett household. Absent: Nate Corddry as Gabriel, Matt Jones as Baxter and French Stewart as Chef Rudy Title meaning: Bonnie's term for sex with Alvin and the vacant apartment opposite hers
34	12	"Kitty Litter and a Class A Felony"	Jeff Greenstein	Story by : Chuck Lorre & Eddie Gorodetsky & Marco Pennette; Teleplay by : Gemma Baker & Adam Chase & Susan McMartin	January 29, 2015	4X6712	11.78
While trying to cope with her own grief after Alvin's death, Christy is forced to perform damage control when Bonnie begins acting out and the rivalry between her and Lorraine intensifies to ridiculous degrees, until she meets with Alvin's sons and gets a surprising helping hand. Absent: Matt Jones as Baxter and Blake Garrett Rosenthal as Roscoe Title meaning: Christy's substitute for Alvin's ashes and Bonnie breaking into Lorraine's house to steal the ashes.
35	13	"Cheeseburger Salad and Jazz"	Ted Wass	Story by : Chuck Lorre & Eddie Gorodetsky; Teleplay by : Nick Bakay & Alissa Neubauer & Sheldon Bull	February 5, 2015	4X6713	11.65
Christy is concerned with the way Bonnie is processing Alvin's death and tries to get her professional help, but things become more difficult when a tow truck driver named Bill (Toby Huss), who bears a slight resemblance to Alvin, comes into their lives. Absent: Nate Corddry as Gabriel, Matt Jones as Baxter, French Stewart as Chef Rudy and Mimi Kennedy as Marjorie Title meaning: Bonnie's order at a Hooters-style restaurant and her attempts to turn Bill into a replacement for Alvin.
36	14	"Benito Poppins and a Warm Pumpkin"	Ted Wass	Story by : Nick Bakay & Britté Anchor; Teleplay by : Chuck Lorre & Alissa Neubauer & Susan McMartin	February 12, 2015	4X6714	10.22
When Christy suddenly gets promoted to manager of the restaurant, she discovers that being the boss comes with its own set of problems. Also, Bonnie has a nemesis in the building who tries to get her fired. Absent: Matt Jones as Baxter and Mimi Kennedy as Marjorie Title meaning: Christy's twisting of Gabriel's metaphor for a successful manager and Bonnie's blackmailing taunts in a tenant meeting.
37	15	"Turkey Meatballs and a Getaway Car"	Ted Wass	Story by : Eddie Gorodetsky & Marco Pennette & Susan McMartin; Teleplay by : Chuck Lorre & Nick Bakay & Gemma Baker & Adam Chase	February 26, 2015	4X6715	8.30
After hiding from Claudia in a suitcase in Gabriel's motel room, Christy discovers that she enjoys sex most when there's a risk of getting caught. Meanwhile, Marjorie nominates Bonnie to be the next secretary of the women's meeting, but Bonnie takes the role a little too seriously. First appearance of: Beth Hall as Wendy; Absent: Sadie Calvano as Violet Title meaning: Bonnie recounts a near-relapse while grocery shopping and Marjorie's memories of running with the Black Panthers.
38	16	"Dirty Money and a Woman Named Mike"	Ted Wass	Story by : Chuck Lorre & Sheldon Bull; Teleplay by : Nick Bakay & Alissa Neubauer	March 5, 2015	4X6716	9.67
While visiting their friend Regina in prison where she is getting paroled early, Christy and Bonnie are shocked at how prison has changed her into a religious fanatic. Christy is also quite relieved when Regina quickly forgives her for gambling away the stolen money she had given Christy for safe keeping. Absent: Sadie Calvano as Violet, Nate Corddry as Gabriel, French Stewart as Chef Rudy and Blake Garret Rosenthal as Roscoe Title meaning: The money Regina left with Christy before getting arrested and Marjorie's remembrances of a former cellmate who was a scrounger.
39	17	"A Commemorative Coin and a Misshapen Head"	Anthony Rich	Story by : Chuck Lorre & Susan McMartin; Teleplay by : Sheldon Bull & Adam Chase	March 12, 2015	4X6717	9.09
Christy and Bonnie start getting worried when they discover that Violet is dating a psychology professor who is more than twenty years older than her. Their anxieties start to intensify after he asks them for her hand in marriage, and things come to a head after Violet gets engaged to him. Absent: Nate Corddry as Gabriel, French Stewart as Chef Rudy and Mimi Kennedy as Marjorie Title meaning: Christy losing a coin toss and Bonnie's queries into Violet's reservedness over introducing her boyfriend.
40	18	"Dropped Soap and a Big Guy on a Throne"	Anthony Rich	Story by : Chuck Lorre & Gemma Baker; Teleplay by : Eddie Gorodetsky & Nick Bakay & Susan McMartin	April 2, 2015	4X6718	8.62
Christy and Bonnie face temptation when Bonnie is prescribed pain medication for a back injury; Bonnie genuinely tries to be responsible but eventually succumbs to addiction, and the episode ends with a To Be Continued screen. Absent: Sadie Calvano as Violet, Nate Corddry as Gabriel, Matt Jones as Baxter, French Stewart as Chef Rudy and Blake Garret Rosenthal as Roscoe; Note: Allison Janney won an Emmy Award for Outstanding Supporting Actress in a Comedy Series for this episode. Title meaning: Bonnie's slipping in the shower that resulted in her injury and her drug-induced conversation with a pair of missionaries.
41	19	"Mashed Potatoes and a Little Nitrous"	James Widdoes	Story by : Chuck Lorre & Marco Pennette; Teleplay by : Gemma Baker & Sheldon Bull & Susan McMartin	April 9, 2015	4X6719	9.03
Bonnie begins relapsing in secret, but is soon found out, leading to a great rift between her and Christy. Christy gets a call from Bonnie late that night, with Bonnie saying she got a DUI and asking to be bailed out; Christy tells Bonnie to wait in jail until the next morning, then sobs in pain over what is happening. The episode ends with a To Be Continued screen. Absent: Sadie Calvano as Violet, Nate Corddry as Gabriel, Matt Jones as Baxter and French Stewart as Chef Rudy Title meaning: A dinner date interrupted by Bonnie's sensitive tooth and the dentist she dates offering to help, leading to them both getting intoxicated.
42	20	"Sick Popes and a Red Ferrari"	James Widdoes	Story by : Alissa Neubauer & Adam Chase; Teleplay by : Chuck Lorre & Eddie Gorodetsky & Nick Bakay	April 16, 2015	4X6720	9.60
After Bonnie's relapse, the women from her meeting rally around to help her through withdrawal and get sober again, but a still-furious Christy wants no part of it and lashes out at her mom until she gains some perspective on things. Absent: Sadie Calvano as Violet, Nate Corddry as Gabriel, Matt Jones as Baxter, French Stewart as Chef Rudy and Blake Garret Rosenthal as Roscoe Title meaning: Christy's fury over the amount of care Bonnie is receiving and Jill describing her own mother's suicide by asphyxiation.
43	21	"Patient Zero and the Chocolate Fountain"	James Widdoes	Story by : Chuck Lorre & Eddie Gorodetsky & Nick Bakay & Marco Pennette; Teleplay by : Adam Chase & Gemma Baker & Susan McMartin	April 23, 2015	4X6721	9.01
Christy is sick of Bonnie after Bonnie's refusal to accept blame for her relapse lands her a huge legal penalty, Bonnie is sick of Christy for not letting her do whatever she wants, and the entire group is sick of both of them for being selfish and fighting all the time. They nearly ruin great news for Marjorie before coming to terms with what they've done wrong by themselves. Absent: Nate Corddry as Gabriel, Matt Jones as Baxter and French Stewart as Chef Rudy Title meaning: Christy's pandemic-themed joke about Bonnie's resentment and an elaborate decoration at Marjorie's secret party.
44	22	"Fun Girl Stuff and Eternal Salvation"	James Widdoes	Story by : Alissa Neubauer & Sheldon Bull; Teleplay by : Chuck Lorre & Warren Bell	April 30, 2015	4X6722	8.78
When Roscoe announces that he wants to live with his father in his new house, Christy is devastated, and she in turns devastates Bonnie when she coldly tells her mom she's moving out to get away from her. However, Christy's efforts to find a new living situation don't work out well, and she and Bonnie eventually mend fences. Absent: Nate Corddry as Gabriel Title meaning: Jill's plans to celebrate Christy moving in and Regina admonishing Jill for an insult to her religious nature.

== Ratings ==
Episode #	Title	Air Date	18-49	Viewers (millions)
1	Hepatitis and Lemon Zest	October 30, 2014	2.5/8	11.13
2	Figgy Pudding and the Rapture	November 6, 2014	2.3/8	10.80
3	Chicken Nuggets and a Triple Homicide	November 13, 2014	2.6/8	11.07
4	Forged Resumes and the Recommended Dosage	November 20, 2014	2.5/8	10.19
5	Kimchi and a Monkey Playing Harmonica	November 27, 2014	1.6/6	7.30
6	Crazy Eyes and a Wet Brad Pitt	December 4, 2014	2.0/6	8.61
7	Soapy Eyes and a Clean Slate	December 11, 2014	2.6/8	10.75
8	Free Therapy and a Dead Lady's Yard Sale	December 18, 2014	2.3/8	10.01
9	Godzilla and a Sprig of Mint	January 8, 2015	2.7/8	12.29
10	Nudes and a Six Day Cleanse	January 15, 2015	2.4/8	10.84
11	Three Smiles and an Unpainted Ceiling	January 22, 2015	2.4/8	11.05
12	Kitty Litter and a Class A Felony	January 29, 2015	2.8/9	11.78
13	Cheeseburger Salad and Jazz	February 5, 2015	2.8/9	11.65
14	Benito Poppins and a Warm Pumpkin	February 12, 2015	2.1/7	10.22
15	Turkey Meatballs and a Getaway Car	February 26, 2015	2.1/6	8.30
16	Dirty Money and a Woman Named Mike	March 5, 2015	2.2/7	9.67
17	A Commemorative Coin and a Misshapen Head	March 12, 2015	2.2/7	9.09
18	Dropped Soap and a Big Guy on a Throne	April 2, 2015	2.0/6	8.62
19	Mashed Potatoes and a Little Nitrous	April 9, 2015	2.0/7	9.03
20	Sick Popes and a Red Ferrari	April 16, 2015	2.2/7	9.60
21	Patient Zero and the Chocolate Fountain	April 23, 2015	1.9/6	9.01
22	Fun Girl Stuff and Eternal Salvation	April 30, 2015	2.0/6	8.78
