= Mom season 1 =

Mom
- Season 1
- DVD artwork
- Starring: Anna Faris; Allison Janney; Sadie Calvano; Nate Corddry; Matt Jones; French Stewart; Spencer Daniels; Blake Garrett Rosenthal
- No. of episodes: 22

Release
- Original network: CBS
- Original release: September 23, 2013 – April 14, 2014

Season chronology
- Next → Season 2

The first season of the television comedy drama series Mom aired on CBS from September 23, 2013, to April 14, 2014. The season was produced by Chuck Lorre Productions and Warner Bros. Television, with series creators Chuck Lorre, Eddie Gorodetsky and Gemma Baker serving as executive producer.

The series follows Christy Plunkett (Anna Faris), a 35-year-old single mother who—after dealing with her battle with alcoholism and drug addiction—decides to restart her life in Napa, California's wine country working as a waitress at the restaurant Rustic Fig and attending Alcoholics Anonymous meetings. Her 51-year-old mother Bonnie Plunkett (Allison Janney) is also a recovering drug and alcohol addict, as well as her 17-year-old daughter Violet (Sadie Calvano), who was born when Christy was 17, has become pregnant by her boyfriend Luke (Spencer Daniels). Christy also has a younger son Roscoe (Blake Garrett Rosenthal) by her ex-husband Baxter (Matt Jones), a deadbeat drug-dealer. Other prominent characters in the series include the manager of Rustic Fig, Gabriel (Nate Corddry) and the head chef, Rudy (French Stewart). The episodes are usually titled with two odd topics that are mentioned in that episode. Season one of Mom consisted of 22 episodes and aired Mondays in the United States at 9.30 p.m. after Mike & Molly.

The series received average ratings of 8.34 million viewers, placing it as the number 42 most watched show of the television season. Allison Janney won the Primetime Emmy Award for Outstanding Supporting Actress in a Comedy Series at the 66th Primetime Emmy Awards for her performance as Bonnie Plunkett, and the series was also nominated for a People's Choice Award for Favorite New Comedy. Mom was renewed for a second season to premiere in the 2014–15 television season.

== Cast ==
=== Main ===
- Anna Faris as Christy Plunkett
- Allison Janney as Bonnie Plunkett
- Sadie Calvano as Violet Plunkett
- Nate Corddry as Gabriel
- Matt Jones as Baxter
- French Stewart as Chef Rudy
- Spencer Daniels as Luke
- Blake Garrett Rosenthal as Roscoe

=== Recurring ===
- Reggie De Leon as Paul
- Mimi Kennedy as Marjorie Armstrong
- Kevin Pollak as Alvin Lester Biletnikoff
- Octavia Spencer as Regina Tompkins
- Ryan Cartwright as Jeff Taylor
- Melissa Tang as Suzanne Taylor
- Courtney Henggeler as Claudia
- Don McManus as Steve Casper
- Mary Pat Gleason as Mary

=== Special guest stars ===
- Jon Cryer as himself
- Lisa Joyner as herself
- Justin Long as Adam Henchy

=== Guest stars ===
- David de Lautour as Greg
- George Paez as Ramone
- Matt Cook as Geoff
- Jim Holmes as Wayne
- Nick Searcy as Nathan
- Lauren Bowles as Mary
- Matt Roth as Jerry
- Jordan Dunn as Jackie Biletnikoff
- Nicholas Stockdale as Douglas Biletnikoff
- Nick Zano as David
- Tiffany Dupont as Alicia
- Rizwan Manji as Dr. Bellin
- Alex Desert as Wes
- Wayne Wilderson as Dr. Butler

== Episodes ==
No. overall	No. in season	Title	Directed by	Written by	Original release date	Prod. code	U.S. viewers (millions)
1	1	"Pilot"	Pamela Fryman	Chuck Lorre & Eddie Gorodetsky & Gemma Baker	September 23, 2013	276061	7.99
After making a series of bad choices, Christy attempts to get her life together but finds it a challenge when her estranged mother, Bonnie, comes back into her life. Title meaning: Pilot episode.
2	2	"A Pee Stick and an Asian Raccoon"	Gary Halvorson	Story by : Nick Bakay & Gemma Baker; Teleplay by : Chuck Lorre & Eddie Gorodetsky	September 30, 2013	4X5402	7.00
Christy and Bonnie put their differences aside and work together to deal with a family crisis. Title meaning: Violet takes a pregnancy test and her doctor has small hands like a raccoon.
3	3	"A Small Nervous Meltdown and a Misplaced Fork"	Gary Halvorson	Story by : Chuck Lorre & Eddie Gorodetsky; Teleplay by : Nick Bakay & Gemma Baker	October 7, 2013	4X5403	6.86
Christy goes on her first date since she quit drinking, while Bonnie teaches Roscoe how to gamble. Title meaning: Christy has a meltdown and Gabriel accidentally sits on a fork in Christy's car.
4	4	"Loathing and Tube Socks"	Jeff Greenstein	Story by : Eddie Gorodetsky & Gemma Baker; Teleplay by : Chuck Lorre & Nick Bakay	October 14, 2013	4X5404	7.44
Everyone tests Christy's patience while Bonnie encounters an old rival. First appearance of: Mimi Kennedy as Marjorie; Absent: Matt Jones as Baxter Title meaning: Christy spends the entire day in a bad mood and gets into an argument with a clerk at the 99-Cent Store.
5	5	"Six Thousand Bootleg T-Shirts and a Prada Handbag"	James Widdoes	Story by : Chuck Lorre & Nick Bakay; Teleplay by : Eddie Gorodetsky & Gemma Baker	October 21, 2013	4X5405	7.28
Christy befriends a woman named Regina (Octavia Spencer) who has a lot of problems while Bonnie tries to put someone else's needs before her own. Absent: Nate Corddry as Gabriel, French Stewart as Chef Rudy and Spencer Daniels as Luke Title meaning: Christy says she tried selling bootleg shirts at a concert and Regina's valuable handbag.
6	6	"Abstinence and Pudding"	Jeff Greenstein	Story by : Nick Bakay & Gemma Baker; Teleplay by : Chuck Lorre & Eddie Gorodetsky	October 28, 2013	4X5406	6.64
Christy tries to take things slow in her relationship with Adam (Justin Long), while Bonnie and Marjorie disagree on the meaning of "taking it slow". Absent: Matt Jones as Baxter Title meaning: Christy's decision to abstain from sex early in her new relationship and her subsequent unconscious stress-eating.
7	7	"Estrogen and a Hearty Breakfast"	James Widdoes	Story by : Eddie Gorodetsky & Gemma Baker; Teleplay by : Chuck Lorre & Nick Bakay & Alissa Neubauer	November 4, 2013	4X5407	7.38
Christy faces off against Luke's conservative parents who do not approve of Violet's pregnancy, while Bonnie deals with menopause. Absent: Matt Jones as Baxter; Note: Allison Janney won an Emmy Award for Outstanding Supporting Actress in a Comedy Series for this episode. Title meaning: Bonnie's attempt to stay young and warming while making a "Hearty Breakfast" creeping out Christy.
8	8	"Big Sur and Strawberry Lube"	Jeff Greenstein	Story by : Chuck Lorre & Eddie Gorodetsky & Alissa Neubauer; Teleplay by : Nick Bakay & Gemma Baker & Christine Zander	November 11, 2013	4X5408	6.96
Christy is nervous about a forthcoming romantic weekend getaway with Adam, while Claudia suspects Gabriel of cheating on her. Title meaning: Adam invites Christy to a wedding at Big Sur and Bonnie brings up strawberry lube for Christy's date.
9	9	"Zombies and Cobb Salad"	Betsy Thomas	Story by : Nick Bakay & Christine Zander & Alissa Neubauer; Teleplay by : Chuck Lorre & Eddie Gorodetsky & Gemma Baker	November 18, 2013	4X5409	6.82
Christy and her fellow AA members try to help when Bonnie loses her job and apartment and hits rock bottom. Absent: Matt Jones as Baxter Title meaning: Bonnie looking "like a zombie" after a wild night of drinking and ordering Cobb salad at lunch after a meeting.
10	10	"Belgian Waffles and Bathroom Privileges"	Jeff Greenstein	Story by : Chuck Lorre & Christine Zander & Alissa Neubauer; Teleplay by : Eddie Gorodetsky & Nick Bakay & Gemma Baker	November 25, 2013	4X5410	7.36
Christy has trouble accepting how much easier life is with Bonnie in the house. Baxter parks his van in the driveway and entertains new women. Absent: Nate Corddry as Gabriel and French Stewart as Chef Rudy Title meaning: Baxter living in his van complete with appliances such as a waffle iron and his making a deal with Christy to park his van in her driveway.
11	11	"Cotton Candy and Blended Fish"	Jeff Greenstein	Story by : Chuck Lorre & Gemma Baker & Alissa Neubauer; Teleplay by : Eddie Gorodetsky & Nick Bakay	December 2, 2013	4X5412	7.68
Christy and Bonnie go above and beyond to help Marjorie who has cancer. Meanwhile, Violet is frustrated by the realities of pregnancy. Absent: Matt Jones as Baxter Title meaning: Bonnie's snide comment about an older woman's hair and Christy blending fish for Marjorie's cats.
12	12	"Corned Beef and Handcuffs"	Jon Cryer	Story by : Eddie Gorodetsky & Gemma Baker & Christine Zander; Teleplay by : Chuck Lorre & Nick Bakay & Alissa Neubauer	December 16, 2013	4X5411	7.44
Christy gets stuck in the middle when Bonnie and Chef Rudy start dating. Absent: Matt Jones as Baxter Title meaning: Chef Rudy's dismissive remarks about Christy's cooking and the bizarre sexual fetishes he tells Bonnie about.
13	13	"Hot Soup and Shingles"	Anthony Rich	Story by : Chuck Lorre & Hayley Mortison; Teleplay by : Eddie Gorodetsky & Nick Bakay	January 13, 2014	4X5413	8.50
Christy has an accident and injures her ankle, yet she refuses any help from Bonnie. Meanwhile, Luke bonds with Baxter about being a father. Title meaning: Christy gets burned walking hot soup to her table and Baxter's job to re-shingle the leaky roof.
14	14	"Leather Cribs and Medieval Rack"	Ted Wass	Story by : Eddie Gorodetsky & Alissa Neubauer & Sheldon Bull; Teleplay by : Chuck Lorre & Nick Bakay & Gemma Baker	January 20, 2014	4X5414	8.27
After Christy discovers Bonnie has been hiding $4000, Bonnie admits that she knows Christy's father. First appearance of: Kevin Pollak as Alvin Absent: Nate Corddry as Gabriel, Matt Jones as Baxter and French Stewart as Chef Rudy Title meaning: Bonnie's fond remembrances about being pregnant with Christy and her complaints about sleeping on Christy's couch.
15	15	"Fireballs and Bullet Holes"	Ted Wass	Story by : Chuck Lorre & Nick Bakay; Teleplay by : Eddie Gorodetsky & Alissa Neubauer & Marco Pennette	January 27, 2014	4X5415	9.58
Christy attempts to bond with her newly discovered father, Alvin (Kevin Pollak), with a little help from a highly irritated Bonnie. Absent: French Stewart as Chef Rudy Title meaning: Christy and Alvin's connection of liking Fireball candy and the seemingly non-noticeable bullet holes of Christy's new car.
16	16	"Nietzsche and a Beer Run"	Ted Wass	Story by : Chuck Lorre; Teleplay by : Eddie Gorodetsky & Nick Bakay & Gemma Baker	February 3, 2014	4X5416	9.11
An attractive fireman named David (Nick Zano) sweeps Christy off her feet, but his illicit behavior threatens her sobriety. Absent: Matt Jones as Baxter and Spencer Daniels as Luke Title meaning: David's philosophy degree and his excuse for drunk driving a fire engine all the way to Christy's house in the middle of the night.
17	17	"Jail, Jail and Japanese Porn"	James Widdoes	Story by : Chuck Lorre & Eddie Gorodetsky; Teleplay by : Nick Bakay & Alissa Neubauer & Marco Pennette	February 24, 2014	4X5417	7.25
Bonnie has to fill in for her daughter when Christy puts her new boyfriend David first. Absent: Matt Jones as Baxter, Spencer Daniels as Luke and Blake Garrett Rosenthal as Roscoe Title meaning: Regina discusses her prison sentence and Bonnie's metaphor of attending Violet's lamaze class.
18	18	"Sonograms and Tube Tops"	Jeff Greenstein	Story by : Nick Bakay & Gemma Baker & Sheldon Bull; Teleplay by : Chuck Lorre & Eddie Gorodetsky & Marco Pennette	March 3, 2014	4X5418	8.42
Christy plans a baby shower for Violet, who's nervous about becoming a mom. Bonnie scores a new life-coaching client. Absent: Nate Corddry as Gabriel Title meaning: Violet gets a sonogram and it's said Violet bought a tube top, even though she's pregnant.
19	19	"Toilet Wine and the Earl of Sandwich"	Jeff Greenstein	Story by : Chuck Lorre; Teleplay by : Gemma Baker & Alissa Neubauer	March 17, 2014	4X5419	7.05
Regina is sentenced to four years in a women's jail. Bonnie, Christy, as well as Marjorie take her to prison, but Regina says she didn't get to say goodbye to her ten-year-old son and Christy decides to drive Regina to say her goodbyes to him before she sees him as a teenager. Regina confronts her ex-husband about him keeping her son away from her and that she has friends on the outside. While at home, Alvin tries to act like a grandpa and talks to Roscoe and Violet about the bad decisions he's made. Alvin accidentally tells Roscoe that Violet is giving the baby up for adoption and Roscoe is upset because he "won't be an uncle". It is revealed that Alvin's wife kicked him out of the house. Absent: Matt Jones as Baxter and Spencer Daniels as Luke Title meaning: Marjorie tells Regina about toilet wine in jail and Alvin tells Violet and Roscoe the history of sandwiches.
20	20	"Clumsy Monkeys and a Tilted Uterus"	Jeff Greenstein	Story by : Chuck Lorre & Gemma Baker; Teleplay by : Alissa Neubauer & Marco Pennette	March 24, 2014	4X5420	7.35
At an AA meeting, Christy and Bonnie meet a lawyer to help with the adoption. Violet decides on the adoptive parents of her child, while Luke still doesn't want to give up the baby. After Christy talks to Luke, he admits to wanting to keep the baby so that Violet doesn't leave him. Luke then decides that giving the baby up for adoption is what's best for them. The adoptive parents, the Taylors, tell them that Violet and Luke can still be in the baby's life if they want to and offer a Luke a job to learn how to design video games, such as Clumsy Monkey. Violet tells Luke that she's never stopped loving him. Christy decides to go school because it was her childhood dream of being a lawyer and Bonnie is happy for her and says that she was always embarrassed that Christy was a waitress. Absent: Matt Jones as Baxter, French Stewart as Chef Rudy and Blake Garrett Rosenthal as Roscoe Title meaning: Name of Mr Taylor's video game and the reason the Taylors cannot have a baby of their own.
21	21	"Broken Dreams and Blocked Arteries"	James Widdoes	Story by : Nick Bakay & Marco Pennette; Teleplay by : Chuck Lorre & Eddie Gorodetsky	March 31, 2014	4X5421	7.27
Violet needs to be talked into going to prom in her full-term pregnancy state. She and Luke go to the prom, where Violet has a case of false labor. Alvin has a heart attack and someone needs to take care of him. Christy pushes Bonnie to do it and when she refuses, Christy realizes it is because she still loves him. The episode ended with a To Be Continued screen. Absent: Nate Corddry as Gabriel, Matt Jones as Baxter and French Stewart as Chef Rudy Title Meaning: Violet's sarcastic answer to the prom's theme and Alvin's blocked arteries resulting in his heart attack.
22	22	"Smokey Taylor and a Deathbed Confession"	Jeff Greenstein	Story by : Gemma Baker & Marco Pennette; Teleplay by : Chuck Lorre & Alissa Neubauer	April 14, 2014	4X5422	6.86
Bonnie denies she's still in love with Alvin, but the two later share a passionate kiss while he lies in his hospital bed. In the same hospital, Violet has her baby. While holding her newborn daughter, she says a tearful good-bye as the Taylors await the news of their adoptive daughter's birth. Absent: Nate Corddry as Gabriel and French Stewart as Chef Rudy Title meaning: Luke's attempt to name the baby "Smokey Taylor" and Alvin confessing that he regrets leaving Bonnie and Christy.

== Ratings ==
Episode #	Title	Air Date	18-49	Viewers (millions)
1	Pilot	September 23, 2013	2.5/6	7.99
2	A Pee Stick and an Asian Raccoon	September 30, 2013	2.2/6	7.00
3	A Small Nervous Meltdown and a Misplaced Fork	October 7, 2013	2.1/5	6.86
4	Loathing and Tube Socks	October 14, 2013	2.0/5	7.44
5	Six Thousand Bootleg T-shirts and a Prada Handbag	October 21, 2013	2.3/6	7.28
6	Abstinence and Pudding	October 28, 2013	2.1/5	6.64
7	Estrogen and a Hearty Breakfast	November 4, 2013	2.0/5	7.38
8	Big Sur and Strawberry Lube	November 11, 2013	1.9/5	6.96
9	Zombies and Cobb Salad	November 18, 2013	1.9/5	6.82
10	Belgian Waffles and Bathroom Privileges	November 25, 2013	2.3/6	7.36
11	Cotton Candy and Blended Fish	December 2, 2013	2.1/5	7.68
12	Corned Beef and Handcuffs	December 16, 2013	1.9/5	7.44
13	Hot Soup and Shingles	January 13, 2014	2.2/5	8.50
14	Leather Cribs and Medieval Rack	January 20, 2014	1.9/5	8.27
15	Fireballs and Bullet Holes	January 27, 2014	2.4/6	9.58
16	Nietzsche and a Beer Run	February 3, 2014	2.4/6	9.11
17	Jail, Jail and Japanese Porn	February 24, 2014	1.9/5	7.25
18	Sonograms and Tube Tops	March 13, 2014	2.0/5	8.42
19	Toilet Wine and the Earl of Sandwich	March 17, 2014	1.8/5	7.05
20	Clumsy Monkeys and a Tilted Uterus	March 24, 2014	1.9/5	7.35
21	Broken Dreams and Blocked Arteries	March 31, 2014	2.2/6	7.27
22	Smokey Taylor and a Deathbed Confession	April 14, 2014	1.9/5	6.86
