= Who Shot Pat? =

1989 American drama film

- Directed by: Robert Brooks
- Written by: Halle Brooks; Robert Brooks
- Produced by: Halle Brooks
- Starring: David Knight; Sandra Bullock; Kevin Otto; Aaron Ingram
- Cinematography: Robert Brooks
- Edited by: Halle Brooks; Robert Brooks
- Music by: Michael Bacon
- Production company: California Pictures
- Distributed by: Castle Hill Productions
- Release date: August 1, 1989
- Running time: 103 minutes
- Country: United States
- Language: English

Who Shot Pat? (promoted as Who Shot Patakango?) is a 1989 American drama film starring Sandra Bullock. It marked the screen debut of Allison Janney. The film highlights the tough streets of New York City in the 1950s and the final realization that a gang is nothing more than a bunch of bums, reminiscent of The Outsiders.

== Plot ==
In Brooklyn, New York a group of high school students in the late 1950s are coming of age. Bic Bickham, a student at a vocational high school in Brooklyn falls in love with Devlin Moran, a private school student from a wealthy family.

== Cast ==
- David Edwin Knight as Bic Bickham
- Sandra Bullock as Devlin Moran
- Kevin Otto as Mark Bickham
- Aaron Ingram as Cougar
- Brad Randall as Patakango
- Chris Cardona as Freddie
- Michael Puzzo as Goldie
- Christopher Crean as Tony
- Gregg Marc Miller as Vinnie
- Damon Chandler as Mr. Donnelly
- Bridget Fogle as Mitsy
- Phil Rosenthal as Principal
- Clint Jordan as Ricky (Dick)
- Ella Arolovi as Marianna
- Nicholas Reiner as Carmen
- Henry Paul as Dice Player
- Allison Janney as Miss Penny
