= Matt Jones (actor) =

American actor (born 1981)

- Born: November 1, 1981 (age 45); Sacramento, California, U.S.
- Other name: Matt L. Jones
- Occupations: Actor; comedian
- Years active: 2002–present
- Spouses: Kelly Daly (m. 2012; div. 2017) Kristen Hager (m. 2020)
- Children: 2

Matt Jones (born November 1, 1981) is an American actor known for his portrayals of Brandon "Badger" Mayhew on the AMC crime drama series Breaking Bad, Baxter on the CBS sitcom Mom, and Ned Dorneget in NCIS. He stars as Douglas Wheeler on the CBS sitcom Bob Hearts Abishola, and is also known for his voice roles as Gunther Magnuson in Kick Buttowski: Suburban Daredevil (2010–2012), Hector Flanagan in Sanjay and Craig (2013–2016), Nuber in F Is for Family (2018–2020), Pig in Pig Goat Banana Cricket (2015–2018), and Wedge in the video game Final Fantasy VII Remake (2020).

== Early life ==
Jones was born in Sacramento, California, and grew up in Pomona, one of ten children between his mother and stepfather. He eventually moved to Claremont and graduated from Claremont High School in 2000.

During this time he started Ultimate Improv in Westwood, before auditioning for Boom Chicago in Amsterdam, where he performed for three years. Due to Boom's rigorous touring schedule, he frequently lost his voice, which eventually became permanently raspy.

== Career ==
Jones was the singer/main songwriter of the Christian ska band Faculty Four. Before leaving for Boom Chicago, Jones appeared in 20 commercials in two years, including a spot for Midas, and has appeared in more than 40 commercials overall. After returning, his first theatrical audition was for the AMC crime drama series Breaking Bad.

From 2008 to 2013, Jones appeared in a recurring role as Brandon "Badger" Mayhew on Breaking Bad. He appeared as a pizza delivery boy on How I Met Your Mother, and has appeared on Comedy Central's Reno 911! and the NBC comedy series Community. He appeared in the pilot episode of the Comedy Central sketch series Key & Peele. He is also a regular performer at the Upright Citizens Brigade Theater and I.O. West.

In 2010, Jones was cast in the lead role in the TBS pilot Uncle Nigel, written and produced by Andy Breckman. He has provided voices on the Cartoon Network series Adventure Time. In 2010, he was also cast as one of the lead roles in the Disney XD series Kick Buttowski: Suburban Daredevil, as the title character's best friend Gunther Magnuson. He appeared in the 2011 film Red State, and voiced minor characters in the 2011 video game Rage. Jones also appeared as Probationary Agent Ned Dorneget in the CBS series NCIS, between 2011 and 2015. In early 2012, Jones was cast in Steven Levitan's new pilot Rebounding for Fox, but the series was not picked up.

Jones appeared in four episodes of The Office ("Junior Salesman", "The Farm", and the two-part series finale). He was cast as a series regular in The Farm, a failed spin-off of The Office. While in the UK to direct Borderline in 2016, Jones appeared in two episodes of character comedy podcast Fact Up. He portrayed Baxter in the CBS sitcom Mom alongside Anna Faris and Allison Janney. In 2018, he starred in the Pop television series Let's Get Physical as Joe Force.

In 2019, he became a cast member on the sitcom Bob Hearts Abishola.

He is the voice of the Boov Kyle in the DreamWorks Animation film Home and its spinoff series Home: Adventures with Tip & Oh. He is the voice of the character Wedge in Final Fantasy VII Remake (2020).

== Personal life ==
Jones married actress Kelly Daly in 2012. The couple had a son, Jasper (b. 2015) and divorced in 2017. He later married actress Kristen Hager on December 21, 2020. and they have a daughter, Jolene (b. 2022).

== Filmography ==
=== Film ===
Year	Title	Role	Notes
2011	High Road	Richie	
2011	Red State	Deputy Pete	
2012	Dreamworld	Ben	
2013	Fireflies	Elroy	
2013	Rolled	Himself	Documentary
2014	Cooties	Sheriff Dave	
2014	Planes: Fire & Rescue	Drip	Voice Cameo
2014	A Merry Christmas Miracle	Cowboy Dick	
2015	Home	Officer Kyle	Voice
2015	Mojave	Louis	
2015	Ricked Wicky: Poor Substitute	Himself	Music Video
2016	The Late Bloomer	Max	
2017	The Layover	Craig	
2017	Austin Found	Matt	
2017	A Bad Idea Gone Wrong	Marlon	
2018	Seven Stages to Achieve Eternal Bliss	Phil	
2019	Brightburn	Noah McNicol	
2019	El Camino: A Breaking Bad Movie	Badger Mayhew	
2019	The Turkey Bowl	Mike Mitchell	
2019	The Night Is Young	Matt	
2020	Wheels of Fortune	Bo Jackson	
2026	Ray Gunn		Voice
2027	Gatto	Enzo	Voice

=== Television ===
Year	Title	Role	Notes
2002	Gilmore Girls	Morgan	Episode: "A Deep Fried Korean Thanksgiving"
2008	Greek	Football Giant	Episode: "Gays, Ghosts, and Gamma Rays"
2008–2013	Breaking Bad	Brandon "Badger" Mayhew	12 episodes
2009	Reno 911!	Cop fan	Episode: "Dangle's Murder Mystery: Part 2"
2009–2010	How I Met Your Mother	Arthur / Pizza Guy	2 episodes
2009–2010	Community	Coffee delivery guy / Vaughn's friend	3 episodes
2010	NCIS: Los Angeles	Cop	Episode: "Deliverance"
2010	Uncle Nigel	Ronnie Wells	Pilot
2010–2012	Kick Buttowski: Suburban Daredevil	Gunther Magnuson	Main voice role
2010, 2015	Adventure Time	Mountain Man / Marauder #5 / Electroid / King Huge	Voice, 2 episodes
2011	Man Up!	Chris "Eggnog" Eggert	Episode: "Finessing the Bromance"
2011	Perfectly Prudence	Nigel	Television film
2011	Worst. Prom. Ever	Kyle	Television film
2011–2015	NCIS	Agent Ned Dorneget	6 episodes
2012	Rebounding	Eli Kaplan	Pilot
2012	Key & Peele	Weed Guy	Episode: "Pilot"
2012	CSI: NY	Steve Blanton	2 episodes
2012	The Cleveland Show	Wheelchair kid	Voice, episode: "Menace II Secret Society"
2012	Dirty Work	Hummy	3 episodes
2012–2013	Tron: Uprising	Lenz	Voice, 3 episodes
2013	Hawaii Five-0	Bullwinkle	Episode: "Kapu"
2013	The Office	Zeke Schrute	3 episodes
2013	NTSF:SD:SUV::	Tavis Cose	Episode: "Comic Con-Air"
2013	Mega Mega Whoosh	Rand Futt	Voice, failed pilot
2013	DC Nation Shorts	Deadman	Voice, 3 episodes
2013	Broad City	Creepy DJ #1	Episode: "Fattest Asses"
2013–2014	Beware the Batman	Humphrey Dumpler / Humpty Dumpty	Voice, 2 episodes
2013–2016	Sanjay and Craig	Hector Flanagan	Main voice role
2013–2019	Mom	Baxter	54 episodes
2014	Drunk History	Himself	Episode: "Sports Heroes"
2015	Comedy Bang! Bang!	Shiloh Huffington	Episode: "Simon Helberg Wears a Sky Blue Button Down Jeans"
2015	Wallykazam	Zack the Garden Gnome	Episode: "Dawn of the Zucchini"
2015–2017	Pig Goat Banana Cricket	Pig, various voices	Main voice role
2016–2018	Home: Adventures with Tip & Oh	Kyle	Main voice role
2018	Let's Get Physical	Joe Force	8 episodes
2018	Danger Mouse	Zeus	Episode: "Clash of the Odd-esy"
2018–2020	F is For Family	Nuber	Voice, 6 episodes
2019–2021	Amphibia	Percy	Voice, 4 episodes
2019–2024	Bob Hearts Abishola	Douglas Wheeler	Main role
2019	Talking Dead	Himself	1 episode
2022–2025	Hamster & Gretel	Dave Grant-Gomez	Main voice role
2023	Teenage Euthanasia	Keith	Episode: "Mother's Day"
2025	Law & Order: Special Victims Unit	Lucas Boone	Episode: "Clickbait"
2026	Shrinking	Nick	1 episode

=== Video games ===
Year	Title	Voice role	Notes
2011	Rage	Gabe	
2014	Planes: Fire & Rescue: The Video Game	Drip	
2020	Final Fantasy VII Remake	Wedge	
2021	Final Fantasy VII: The First Soldier	Wedge	
2024	Final Fantasy VII Rebirth	Wedge	
