= Allison Janney =

American actress (born 1959)

- Janney in 2026
- Born: Allison Brooks Janney; November 19, 1959 (age 67); Boston, Massachusetts, U.S.
- Education: Kenyon College; Royal Academy of Dramatic Art
- Occupation: Actress
- Years active: 1989–present
- Partner(s): Dennis Gagomiros (1994–2001); Richard Jenik (2002–2006)
- Awards: Full list

Allison Brooks Janney (born November 19, 1959) is an American actress. Known for her performances across the screen and stage, she has received various accolades, including an Academy Award, eight Primetime Emmy Awards, a British Academy Film Award, and a Golden Globe Award, in addition to nominations for two Tony Awards.

Born in Boston and raised in Dayton, Ohio, Janney received a scholarship to study at the Royal Academy of Dramatic Art in London following her graduation from Kenyon College. After years of minor and uncredited film and television appearances, Janney's breakthrough came with the role of C. J. Cregg in the NBC political drama series The West Wing (1999–2006), for which she received four Primetime Emmy Awards. In 2014, for her guest role of Margaret Scully, a sexually repressed 1950s housewife on Showtime's period drama series Masters of Sex, she won a fifth Emmy. For her portrayal of Bonnie Plunkett, a cynical recovering addict on the CBS sitcom Mom (2013–2021), Janney won two more Emmys. She portrayed Vice President turned President Grace Penn in the Netflix drama series The Diplomat (2024–), earning her eighth Emmy for its third season.

Janney made her professional stage debut with the Off-Broadway production Ladies (1989), and followed with numerous bit parts in various similar productions, before making her Broadway debut with the 1996 revival of Present Laughter. She won two Drama Desk Awards and has been nominated for two Tony Awards: for Best Actress in a Play for her performance in the Broadway revival of A View from the Bridge (1997), and for Best Actress in a Musical for her role in the original Broadway production of the musical 9 to 5 (2009).

Janney has played character roles in various films, including Primary Colors (1998), Drop Dead Gorgeous (1999), American Beauty (1999), 10 Things I Hate About You (1999), The Hours (2002), Juno (2007), Hairspray (2007), The Help (2011), Spy (2015), Bad Education (2019), and Bombshell (2019). For her portrayal of LaVona Golden in the film I, Tonya (2017), Janney won the Academy Award for Best Supporting Actress.

== Early life and education ==
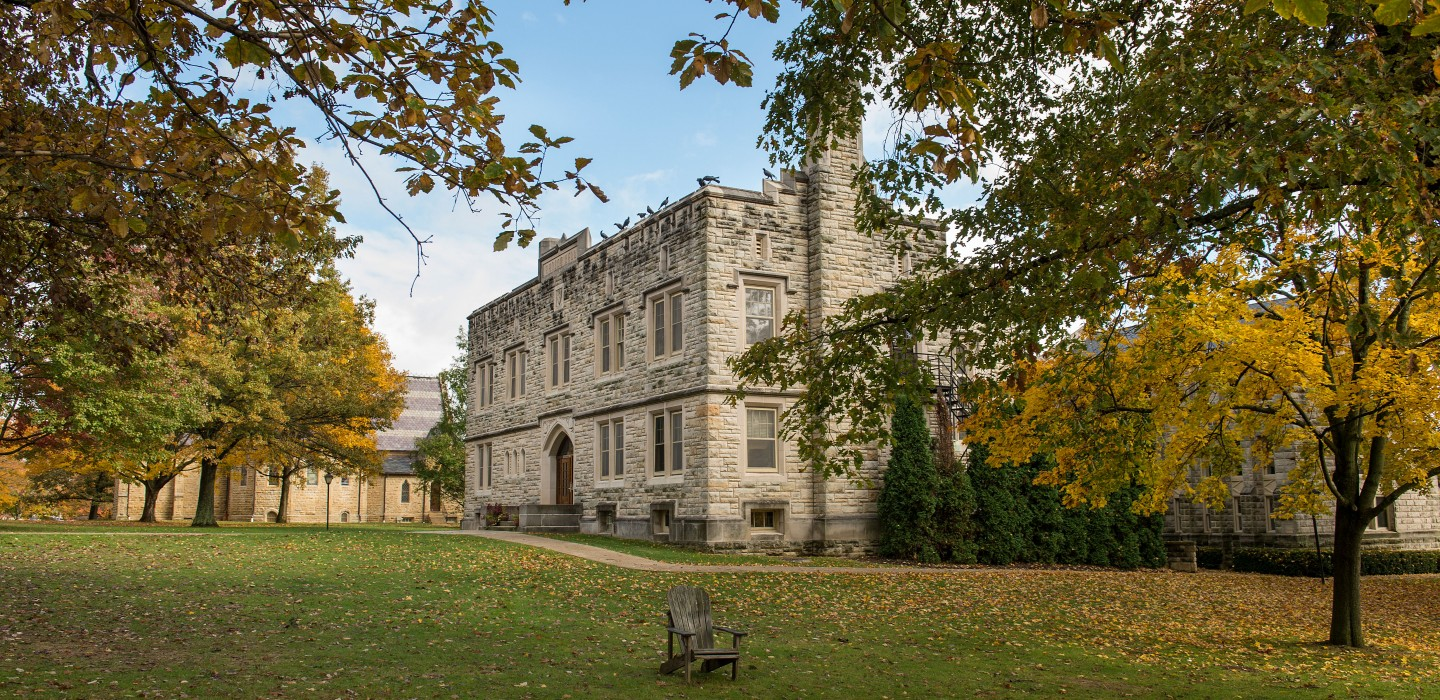
Kenyon College, which Janney attended

Allison Brooks Janney was born on November 19, 1959, in Boston, Massachusetts, and raised in Cincinnati and Dayton, Ohio. She is the daughter of Macy Brooks Janney (née Putnam), a former actress, and Jervis Spencer Janney Jr., a real estate developer and jazz musician. She has an older brother, Jay, and had a younger brother, Hal (1961–2011). Hal, who had battled depression and addiction for many years, died by suicide in 2011 at the age of 49.

Janney is a descendant of Stephen Hopkins through his daughter Constance Hopkins, both of whom travelled to the New World on the Mayflower, as she recounted on a 2022 episode of Who Do You Think You Are?

She attended the Miami Valley School in Dayton, where she was named a distinguished alumna in 2005, and the Hotchkiss School in Connecticut, where she was named Alumna of the Year in 2016. Janney initially aspired to a career in figure skating, but her height of 6 ft (183 cm) and a domestic accident when she was a teenager put an end to that dream.

She attended Kenyon College in Gambier, Ohio, where she majored in theatre. During her freshman year, Janney met actors Paul Newman and Joanne Woodward at a play for the inaugural event of the college's newly built Bolton Theater, which Newman was directing. The couple encouraged her to continue acting and offered her guidance during the early days in her career. She went on to train at the Neighborhood Playhouse School of the Theatre in New York and then received a scholarship to study at the Royal Academy of Dramatic Art in mid-1984.

== Career ==
=== 1989–1998: Early roles and Broadway debut ===
Janney's first role on television was in the short-lived black-and-white faux-1940s comedy Morton & Hayes. She moved on to soap operas; she played the recurring role of Ginger, one of the Spaulding maids, on Guiding Light for two years. In the spring of 1994, she appeared in the season-four finale of Law & Order, titled "Old Friends", as a reluctant witness against a member of the Russian mob. She was also a cast member on the radio show A Prairie Home Companion. Janney made her professional stage debut in 1989 with an uncredited part in the Off-Broadway production Ladies. following minor roles in similar productions like Prescribed Laughter In The Emergency Café, Five Women Wearing the Same Dress and Blue Window.

Janney made her Broadway debut with the 1996 revival of Noël Coward's Present Laughter. She played Liz Essendine, the estranged wife of the lead character (played by Frank Langella). Although a minor role, her performance garnered praise and attention with The New York Times calling it "The most fully accomplished performance on the stage". For her performance in the play, Janney won the Theatre World Award, Clarence Derwent Award for Most Promising Female, Outer Critics Circle Award for Outstanding Featured Actress in a Play and received a nomination for the Drama Desk Award for Outstanding Featured Actress in a Play. Janney made her film debut with a minor part in Who Shot Pat? (1989). This was followed by a series of minor roles in numerous films throughout the 1990s, including; Wolf (1994), Big Night (1996), Private Parts (1997), The Ice Storm (1997), The Object of My Affection (1998), The Impostors (1998), Primary Colors (1998), Drop Dead Gorgeous (1999), 10 Things I Hate About You (1999), and American Beauty (1999).

Janney starred in the Roundabout Theatre Company's 1998 revival of Arthur Miller's A View from the Bridge to positive reviews. Janney starred opposite Anthony LaPaglia, Stephen Spinella, and Brittany Murphy. Vincent Canby of The New York Times praised Janney, writing "Allison Janney is splendid as Beatrice, a loving, patient woman of backbone who looks on helplessly but not quietly as her husband heads into the darkness". Charles Isherwood of Variety agreed describing her performance as "affecting". For her performance, Janney won the Drama Desk Award for Outstanding Featured Actress in a Play, Outer Critics Circle Award for Outstanding Actress in a Play, and received a nomination for the Tony Award for Best Actress in a Play.

=== 1999–2006: The West Wing ===
After a decade of small and uncredited parts, Janney had her breakthrough when she was cast as White House Press Secretary C. J. Cregg in the NBC political drama The West Wing. Creator Aaron Sorkin called Janney to audition for the role after seeing her in the film Primary Colors. Loosely based on Dee Dee Myers, the press secretary during Clinton administration, C. J. is a National Merit Scholar who ultimately succeeds Leo McGarry as White House Chief of Staff. Writing for The Atlantic, John Reid says that "her capability and combination of strength and simple compassion represented the fantasy of the Bartlet White House better than anyone." The publication also ranks her as the best character from the series. In their ranking of the best characters from all the television series created by Sorkin, Vulture ranks C. J. at No. 2 and says; "If all the Sorkin women were as classy, self-assured, and legitimately funny (the turkey pardon!) as C. J., we'd never have had the Sorkin woman argument in the first place". For her portrayal of C. J. Cregg, Janney won four Primetime Emmy Awards, four Screen Actors Guild Award, a Satellite Award and four nominations for the Golden Globe Awards, making her the most awarded cast member of the series.

She also appeared in Nurse Betty (2000), The Hours (2002), Finding Nemo (2003), How to Deal (2003), The Chumscrubber (2005), Winter Solstice (2004), and Our Very Own (2005). For the last of these, she received a nomination for the Independent Spirit Award for Best Supporting Female. During this time Janney guest starred on the sitcom Frasier in the 2002 episode "Three Blind Dates".

=== 2007–2016: Established actor ===
Janney appeared in the short-lived Studio 60 on the Sunset Strip (2007) as a guest. In 2010, Janney appeared as Allison Pearson in In Plain Sight. In May 2010, she appeared one of the final episodes of the television series Lost as the adoptive mother of the show's two mythological opponents, Jacob and The Man in Black. She starred in the ABC network comedy Mr. Sunshine. The series, which was created by Matthew Perry, was a mid-season replacement for the 2010–11 television season.

In 2007, Janney starred in Jason Reitman's comedy-drama Juno, playing Bren MacGuff, the titular character's stepmother. In the same year, she appeared in the musical Hairspray, and won the Austin Film Critics Association Award for Best Supporting Actress and the Critics' Choice Movie Awards for Best Acting Ensemble. In 2010, Janney earned praise for her performance in Todd Solondz's comedy-drama Life During Wartime. In 2009, Janney starred in the musical 9 to 5 alongside Stephanie J. Block and Megan Hilty. Her performance garnered positive reviews, and Janney earned the Drama Desk Award for Outstanding Actress in a Musical and a nomination for the Tony Award for Best Actress in a Musical.

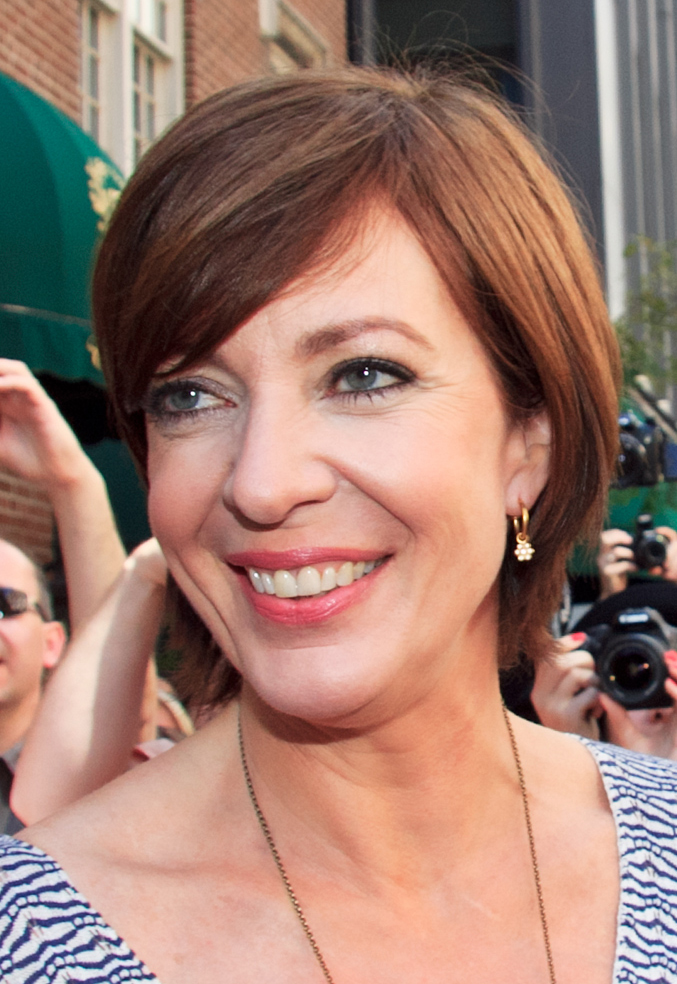
Janney during the premiere of The Help at the 2011 Toronto International Film Festival

In 2011, Janney appeared in Tate Taylor's period drama The Help alongside Emma Stone, Viola Davis, Octavia Spencer, Jessica Chastain, Mary Steenburgen and others. She won the Screen Actors Guild Award and Critics' Choice Movie Award for Best Acting Ensemble. The film was also nominated for the Academy Award for Best Picture. She also appeared in the drama Margaret (2011), the coming-of-age comedy Struck by Lightning (2012), and the comedy Liberal Arts (2012).

Following a few short-lived shows and a brief sabbatical from television, Janney returned to the small screen with the CBS sitcom Mom, which ran from 2013 until 2021. Janney played Bonnie Plunkett, a self-centered, cynical recovering addict who tries to regain the love and trust of her daughter (played by Anna Faris). She was influenced to take on the role following the death of her younger brother from drug addiction, as well as her longtime desire to work on multicam comedy. For her performance on the series, Janney garnered critical acclaim and six Primetime Emmy Award nominations, winning twice as Outstanding Supporting Actress in a Comedy Series. She also received six nominations at the Critics' Choice Television Awards winning twice for Best Supporting Actress in a Comedy Series. From 2014 to 2016, Janney guest-starred in Showtime's period drama Masters of Sex, portraying a sexually repressed homemaker in 1950s who struggles to understand the disintegration of her marriage. Her performance received praise with Janney receiving three consecutive nominations for the Primetime Emmy Award for Outstanding Guest Actress in a Drama Series winning one in 2014, and winning the Critics' Choice Television Award for Best Guest Performer in a Drama Series.

Janney later acted in the summer comedy The Way Way Back (2013), the spy comedy Spy (2015), the high school teen comedy The DUFF (2015), the fantasy film Miss Peregrine's Home for Peculiar Children (2016), the comedy-drama Tallulah (2016), and psychological mystery thriller The Girl on the Train (2016). She voiced Julia in The Simpsons episode "Friends and Family" (2016) and acted as herself in the IFC sketch series Comedy Bang! Bang! episode "Allison Janney Wears a Chambray Western Shirt and Suede Fringe Boots".

=== 2017–present: Career expansion ===
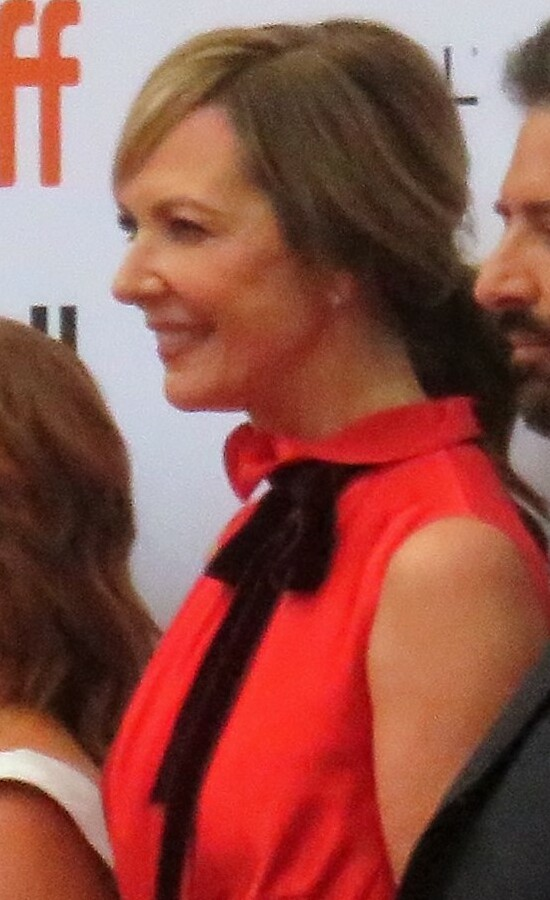
Janney at the premiere of Bad Education at the 2019 Toronto International Film Festival.

In 2017, Janney returned to Broadway with the revival of John Guare's Six Degrees of Separation in the role of Ouisa Kittredge. Marilyn Stasio of Variety praised Janney's performance writing, "[Her] wicked, smart delivery is perfect for Guare's witty dialogue." David Rooney of The Hollywood Reporter concurred writing, "I found I couldn't take my eyes off her...she looks spectacular in costumer Clint Ramos' sleek socialite outfits, and she nails both the initial poise and the despairing needed [for the role]". Janney received nominations for the Drama Desk Award for Outstanding Actress in a Play, Drama League Award for Distinguished Performance and won the Outer Critics Circle Award for Outstanding Actress in a Play.

In 2017, Janney starred in Craig Gillespie's black comedy I, Tonya, based on the life of figure skater Tonya Harding. Screenwriter Steven Rogers wrote the role of LaVona specifically for Janney and refused to sell his screenplay until Janney was cast in the film. Janney would consider the part as one of the most challenging of her career. Janney's performance received widespread acclaim with Michael O'Sullivan of The Washington Post writing: 'Janney steals every scene she's in, playing LaVona, a harridan whose nodding goes beyond tough love.' She earned numerous accolades for her performance in the film including the Academy Award, Golden Globe, Screen Actors Guild Award, Critics' Choice Movie Award, Independent Spirit Award, and BAFTA Award for Best Supporting Actress.

Janney appeared as herself, in a 2019 episode of the second season of the Netflix series The Kominsky Method. On the Disney Channel animated show Phineas and Ferb, Janney voiced Dr. Doofenshmirtz's ex-wife, Charlene. Janney appeared in five films in 2019. She had cameo appearances in the family comedy Troop Zero, the psychological thriller Ma, and Bombshell. For the last of these she received nominations at the Screen Actors Guild Award, and Critics' Choice Movie Award Best Acting Ensemble. Janney also voiced Margaux Needler in the animated version of The Addams Family. Janney also appeared in Bad Education and Tate Taylor's comedy-drama Breaking News in Yuba County. She also had the title role in J. J. Abrams's thriller Lou. In 2022, Janney appeared in an episode of Who Do You Think You Are? in which she learned she was descended from Stephen Hopkins, one of the settlers on the Mayflower. Janney subsequently appeared in the romantic comedy film The People We Hate at the Wedding (2022), and the science fiction film The Creator (2023).

In 2024, Janney began portraying Evelyn Rollins, a socialite in the late 1960’s in Apple TV+'s period comedy series Palm Royale. The same year she guest starred in the final season of the sitcom Curb Your Enthusiasm. In 2024, Janney began starring in Netflix's political drama The Diplomat as Grace Penn. Her first foray into the genre since The West Wing, Janney's performance garnered critical acclaim and nominations at the Critics Choice Awards, Golden Globe Awards, and the Screen Actors Guild Awards with Rolling Stone ranking her performance amongst "The 10 Best TV Performances of 2024". In 2026, she won the Primetime Emmy Award for Outstanding Supporting Actress in a Drama Series for that performance, which meant she had 8 Emmy wins in all, tying her for the record of most Emmy wins for acting. Janney appears in the 2025 films Another Simple Favor and Everything's Going to Be Great.

== Activism ==
In 2018, Janney participated in the 2018 Women's March in Los Angeles, part of a larger national movement for women's rights, human rights, and social justice.

In 2016, Janney was honored at the White House at the event "Champions of Change", which honored 10 people for advancing addiction prevention, treatment, and recovery. She also participated in a panel discussion with Surgeon General Vivek Murthy about the portrayal of addiction and recovery in the media. In 2017, Janney donated $250,000 to Planned Parenthood. In 2020 with the outbreak of the COVID-19 pandemic, Janney donated $10,000 to the Dayton Foodbank, an organization providing food to the homeless.

Janney and her West Wing co-stars were part of Michelle Obama's When We All Vote initiative. More recently, she participated in Divas for Democracy: United We Slay, a streaming variety show supporting voter registration.

== Personal life ==
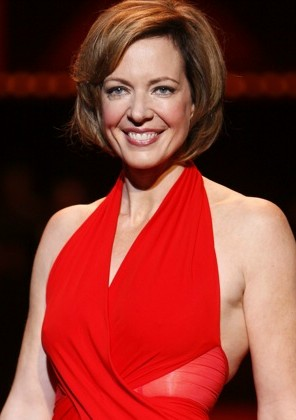
Janney in 2008

Janney has never been married and has no children, of which she said: "I've never had that instinct to have kids, I'm at peace with it". She was romantically involved with computer programmer Dennis Gagomiros. The couple began dating in 1994, and were interested in getting married but ended their relationship after seven years together in 2001. In 2002, she met actor Richard Jenik (her co-star in Our Very Own). The couple got engaged in 2004 but broke up two years later in 2006. In 2012, Janney met production manager Philip Joncas on the set of The Way, Way Back and they began dating soon after. The couple dated for five years before ending their relationship in 2017.

In interviews related to her role on Mom, Janney discussed her brother, Hal, who fought drug addiction for years before he died by suicide. She has credited playing her character on Mom to people fighting addiction. On March 4, 2018, Janney dedicated her Academy Award win to him during her acceptance speech.

In 2004, she began lending her voice to television and radio spots created by Kaiser Permanente in the health maintenance organization's broad "Thrive" media campaign, and in a radio campaign for the American Institute of Architects. In September 2010, it was announced that Janney would be the voice of the Aly San San spokesdroid in the Disney attraction Star Tours – The Adventures Continue. The attraction later opened at Disney's Hollywood Studios and Disneyland. In October 2016, Janney became the first woman to receive the Alumni Award of The Hotchkiss School and received a star on the Hollywood Walk of Fame for her work in the entertainment industry, located at 6100 Hollywood Boulevard.

== Filmography ==
=== Film ===
Year	Title	Role	Notes
1989	Who Shot Pat?	Miss Penny	
1994	Dead Funny	Jennifer	
1994	The Cowboy Way	NYPD computer operator	
1994	Wolf	Party Guest	
1994	Miracle on 34th Street	Woman in Christmas Shop	
1994	Heading Home	Mary Polanski	
1996	Flux	Heather	
1996	Rescuing Desire	Betsy	
1996	Walking and Talking	Gum Puller	
1996	Big Night	Ann	
1996	Faithful	Saleswoman	
1996	The Associate	Sandy	
1997	Anita Liberty	Gynecologist	Short film
1997	Private Parts	Dee Dee	
1997	The Ice Storm	Dot Halford	
1997	Julian Po	Lilah Leech	
1998	Primary Colors	Miss Walsh	
1998	The Object of My Affection	Constance Miller	
1998	The Impostors	Maxine	
1998	Six Days, Seven Nights	Marjorie Smith, Robin's Boss	
1998	Celebrity	Evelyn Isaacs	
1999	10 Things I Hate About You	Ms. Perky	
1999	Drop Dead Gorgeous	Loretta	
1999	American Beauty	Barbara Fitts	
1999	The Debtors		
2000	Leaving Drew	Paula	Short film
2000	Auto Motives	Gretchen	Short film
2000	Nurse Betty	Lyla Branch	
2000	Rooftop Kisses	Melissa	Short film
2002	The Hours	Sally Lester	
2003	Finding Nemo	Peach	Voice
2003	How to Deal	Lydia Martin	
2003	Chicken Party	Barbara Strasser	Short film
2004	Piccadilly Jim	Eugenia Crocker	
2004	Winter Solstice	Molly Ripkin	
2005	Strangers with Candy	Alice	
2005	Our Very Own	Joan Whitfield	
2005	The Chumscrubber	Allie Stifle	
2006	Over the Hedge	Gladys Sharp	Voice
2007	Hairspray	Prudy Pingleton	
2007	Juno	Brenda "Bren" MacGuff	
2008	Pretty Ugly People	Suzanna	
2008	Prop 8: The Musical	Prop 8 leader's wife	Short film from Funny or Die
2009	Away We Go	Lily Anderson	
2009	Life During Wartime	Trish Maplewood	
2011	Margaret	Wounded woman / Monica Patterson	
2011	The Help	Charlotte Phelan	
2011	The Oranges	Cathy Ostroff	
2012	A Thousand Words	Samantha Davis	
2012	Struck by Lightning	Sheryl Phillips	
2012	Liberal Arts	Prof. Judith Fairfield	
2013	The Way, Way Back	Betty Thompson	
2013	Days and Nights	Elizabeth	
2013	Bad Words	Dr. Bernice Deagan	
2013	Trust Me	Meg	
2013	Brightest Star	The Astronomer	
2014	Tammy	Deb	
2014	Mr. Peabody & Sherman	Ms. Grunion	Voice
2014	The Rewrite	Prof. Mary Weldon	
2014	Get On Up	Kathy	
2015	The DUFF	Dottie Piper	
2015	Spy	Elaine Crocker	
2015	Minions	Madge Nelson	Voice
2016	Tallulah	Margaret "Margo" Mooney	
2016	Finding Dory	Peach	Voice, cameo
2016	Miss Peregrine's Home for Peculiar Children	Dr. Nancy Golan / Mr. Barron	
2016	The Girl on the Train	Detective Riley	
2017	A Happening of Monumental Proportions	Principal Nichols	
2017	Sun Dogs	Rose Chipley	
2017	I, Tonya	LaVona Golden	
2019	Troop Zero	Miss Massey	
2019	Ma	Dr. Brooks	Cameo
2019	Bad Education	Pamela "Pam" Gluckin	
2019	The Addams Family	Margaux Needler	Voice
2019	Bombshell	Susan Estrich	
2020	Lazy Susan	Velvet Swensen	
2020	The Great Man Himself	Jan	Short film
2021	Breaking News in Yuba County	Sue Buttons	Also executive producer
2022	To Leslie	Nancy	
2022	Lou	Lou Adell	Also executive producer
2022	The People We Hate at the Wedding	Donna	
2023	The Creator	Colonel Howell	
2025	Another Simple Favor	Aunt Linda McLanden	
2025	Everything's Going to Be Great	Macy Smart	
2025	The Roses	Eleanor	
2026	Minions & Monsters	Olivia H.	Voice
2026	The Dog Stars	Darlene	
2027	Not Alone †	TBA	Voice; in production
TBA	Fonda †	TBA	Filming

Key
†	Denotes films that have not yet been released

=== Television ===
Year	Title	Role	Notes
1991	Morton & Hayes	Beatrice Caldicott-Hayes	2 episodes
1992	Law & Order	Nora	Episode: "Star Struck"
1993	Blind Spot	Doreen	Television film
1993–1995	Guiding Light	Ginger	Numerous episodes
1994	Law & Order	Ann Madsen	Episode: "Old Friends"
1995	The Wright Verdicts	Alice Klein	Episode: "Sins of the Father"
1995	New York Undercover	Vivian	Episode: "Digital Underground"
1996	Aliens in the Family	Principal Sherman	Episode: "A Very Brody Tweeznax"
1996	Cosby	Podiatric Nurse	Episode: "Happily Ever Hilton"
1997	...First Do No Harm	Dr. Melanie Abbasac	Television film
1997	Path to Paradise	Assistant District Attorney	Television film
1998	David and Lisa	Alix	Television film
1999	LateLine	Helen Marschant	Episode: "The Minister of Television"
1999–2006	The West Wing	C. J. Cregg	Main cast; 155 episodes
2000–2003	Scruff	Holly	Voice, main role
2000	A Girl Thing	Kathy McCormack	Television film
2001–2002	Frasier	Phyllis / Susanna	2 episodes
2003	King of the Hill	Laura	Episode: "Full Metal Dust Jacket"
2005	Weeds	Ms. Greenstein	Episode: "Lude Awakening"
2007	Two and a Half Men	Beverly	Episode: "My Damn Stalker"
2007	Studio 60 on the Sunset Strip	Herself	Episode: "The Disaster Show"
2008–2013	Phineas and Ferb	Charlene Doofenshmirtz	Voice, 9 episodes
2010–2015	Family Guy	Various	Voice, 3 episodes
2010	Lost	"Mother"	Episode: "Across the Sea"
2010	In Plain Sight	Allison Pearson	2 episodes
2011	Glenn Martin, DDS	Marcia	Episode: "GlennHog Day"
2011	Mr. Sunshine	Crystal Cohen	Main cast; 13 episodes
2012	The Big C	Rita Strauss	Episode: "Life Rights"
2012	Robot Chicken	Grammi Gummi / Woman	Voice, episode: "In Bed Surrounded by Loved Ones"
2013	Veep	Janet Ryland	Episode: "First Response"
2013–2015	Masters of Sex	Margaret Scully	9 episodes
2013–2021	Mom	Bonnie Plunkett	Main role; 170 episodes
2014	Web Therapy	Judith Frick	2 episodes
2015	Key & Peele	Various	Episode: "Key & Peele's Super Bowl Special"
2016	The Simpsons	Julia	Voice, episode: "Friends and Family"
2016	Comedy Bang! Bang!	Herself	Episode: "Allison Janney Wears a Chambray Western Shirt and Suede Fringe Boots"
2017–2018	F Is for Family	Henrietta Van Horne	Voice, 5 episodes
2017	Nobodies	Herself	2 episodes
2017	American Dad!	Jessie	Voice, episode: "Family Plan"
2018–2020	DuckTales	Goldie O'Gilt	Voice, 5 episodes
2019	The Kominsky Method	Herself	Episode: "Chapter 16. A Thetan Arrives"
2020	A West Wing Special to Benefit When We All Vote	C. J. Cregg	Television special
2020	Celebrity IOU	Herself	Episode: "Alison Janney Gifts A Showstopper"
2021	Q-Force	Unknown	Voice, episode: "WeHo Confidential"
2022	Who Do You Think You Are?	Herself	Episode: "Allison Janney"
2024–2026	Palm Royale	Evelyn Rollins	Main role
2024	Curb Your Enthusiasm	Cynthia	Episode: "No Lessons Learned"
2024–present	The Diplomat	Grace Penn	
2026	Miss You, Love You	Diane Patterson	Television film

=== Theatre ===
Year	Title	Role	Venue	Notes
1985	Undiscovered Country	Performer	Williamstown Theatre Festival	Massachusetts
1985	Citizen Tom Paine	Woman #1	Williamstown Theatre Festival	Massachusetts
1986	Hawthorne Country	Elizabeth	Williamstown Theatre Festival	Massachusetts
1986	Eleanor	Lorena Hickok	Williamstown Theatre Festival	Massachusetts
1989	Ladies	Nickie	The Theater at St. Clements	Off-Broadway
1991	Prescribed Laughter In The Emergency Café	Performer	Powerhouse Theatre	Poughkeepsie
1992	Making Book	Megan Chamber	45th Street Theatre	Off-Broadway
1993	Five Women Wearing the Same Dress	Mindy	MCC Theater	Off-Broadway
1993	Class One Acts	Performer	MCC Theatre	Off-Broadway
1993	Breaking Up	Alice	Delacorte Theater	Off-Broadway
1995	New England	Gemma Baker	New York Theatre Workshop	Off-Broadway
1996	Blue Window	Boo	Second Stage Theater	Off-Broadway
1996	Present Laughter	Liz Essendine	Walter Kerr Theatre	Broadway
1997	A View from the Bridge	Beatrice Carbone	Brooks Atkinson Theatre	Broadway
1999	The Taming of the Shrew	Katherina	Delacorte Theatre	Off-Broadway
2007	The Autumn Garden	Constance Tuckerman	Williamstown Theatre Festival	Massachusetts
2009	9 to 5: The Musical	Violet Newstead	Marquis Theatre	Broadway
2017	Six Degrees of Separation	Ouisa Kittredge	Ethel Barrymore Theatre	Broadway
2026	Other Desert Cities	Silda Grauman	Hudson Theatre	Broadway

=== Music video ===
Year	Title	Role	Notes
2016	"Let Me Be Your Girl"	Clown	Artist: Rachael Yamagata; Director: Josh Radnor

== See also ==
- List of Kenyon College people
- List of Primetime Emmy Award winners
- List of stars on the Hollywood Walk of Fame
- List of actors with Academy Award nominations
- List of alumni of the Royal Academy of Dramatic Art
