= Mom season 5 =

Season of American television series

Mom
- Season 5
- Starring: Anna Faris; Allison Janney; Mimi Kennedy; Jaime Pressly; Beth Hall; William Fichtner
- No. of episodes: 22

Release
- Original network: CBS
- Original release: November 2, 2017 – May 10, 2018

Season chronology
- ← Previous; Season 4 Next → Season 6

The fifth season of the situational comedy drama Mom began airing on November 2, 2017, and concluded on May 10, 2018 on CBS in the United States. The season is produced by Chuck Lorre Productions and Warner Bros. Television, with series creators Chuck Lorre, Eddie Gorodetsky and Gemma Baker serving as executive producer.

Christy (Anna Faris) has gone back to school and is pursuing her dream of becoming a lawyer, while Bonnie (Allison Janney) attempts to have a healthy romantic relationship with her fiancé, Adam (William Fichtner). Through it all, Christy and Bonnie rely on their support system from AA, including the wise Marjorie (Mimi Kennedy), the wealthy and sometimes misguided Jill (Jaime Pressly), and the overly emotional Wendy (Beth Hall). Collectively, they help each other stay sober in the face of whatever life throws at them. The episodes are usually titled with two odd topics that are mentioned in that episode.

Jaime Pressly was absent from a few episodes due to her maternity leave.

Season five of Mom aired Thursdays in the United States at 9:00 p.m. after Young Sheldon.

== Cast ==
=== Main ===
- Anna Faris as Christy Plunkett
- Allison Janney as Bonnie Plunkett
- Mimi Kennedy as Marjorie Armstrong-Perugian
- Jaime Pressly as Jill Kendall
- Beth Hall as Wendy Harris
- William Fichtner as Adam Janikowski

=== Recurring ===
- Steven Weber as Patrick Janikowski
- Missi Pyle as Natasha
- Yvette Nicole Brown as Nora Rogers
- Amy Hill as Beverly Tarantino
- Charlie Robinson as Mr. Munson
- Julia Lester as Emily
- Leonard Roberts as Ray Stabler
- Matt Jones as Baxter
- French Stewart as Chef Rudy
- Lauri Johnson as Beatrice
- Reggie De Leon as Paul
- Mary Pat Gleason as Mary

=== Special guest stars ===
- Kristin Chenoweth as Miranda
- Kristen Johnston as Tammy Diffendorf
- Patti LuPone as Rita Gennaro

=== Guest stars ===
- Michael Angarano as Cooper
- Beth Littleford as Lorraine
- Danielle Bisutti as Dana
- Patricia Belcher as Gloria
- Matt Oberg as Geoffrey
- Ryan Malgarini as Brendan
- Kevin Fonteyne as Danny
- Lela Lee as Alice
- Terri Hoyos as Soledad
- Jazmyn Simon as Vanessa
- Mary Faber as Marla
- Jared Gretner as Peter
- Bill Fagerbakke as Sergeant Reubenzer
- Max Adler as Officer Blankenship
- George Paez as Ramone

== Episodes ==
| No. overall | No. in season | Title | Directed by | Written by | Original release date | Prod. code | U.S. viewers (millions) |
|---|---|---|---|---|---|---|---|
| 89 | 1 | "Twinkle Lights and Grandma Shoes" | James Widdoes | Story by : Nick Bakay & Gemma Baker; Teleplay by : Adam Chase & Marco Pennette & Anne Flett-Giordano | November 2, 2017 | T12.15701 | 8.46 |
Adam proposes to Bonnie, who panics and says "no" twice before finally accepting. The girls think Bonnie is hiding feelings that she is not good enough to marry anyone, even someone she loves. Elsewhere, Natasha asks Christy's help to find her a job so she can get Emily back, while Jill is feeling depressed and has gained a lot of weight. Also, Christy is thrilled to hear that she passed her LSAT test with an "average" score. Title meaning: The booth lighting at the restaurant where Adam proposes and the shoes that Natasha sees a waitress wearing.
| 90 | 2 | "Fish Town and Too Many Thank You's" | James Widdoes | Story by : Eddie Gorodetsky & Susan McMartin; Teleplay by : Alissa Neubauer & Sheldon Bull & Britté Anchor | November 9, 2017 | T12.15702 | 8.69 |
Ray returns from rehab, saying he's doing really well being clean. As Ray and Adam go to a Warriors basketball game, Bonnie and Christy borrow Ray's Mercedes to drive to their meeting. They get stopped by a police officer because of a burned out taillight, and while the officer is back at her car, Christy finds both cocaine and marijuana in the glove box. Christy and Bonnie confront Ray, who says he only uses "occasionally" and does not need help. The girls later find out that Ray lost his job and is "on a break" from his husband David. Bonnie wants to help him but eventually listens to Marjorie's advice on "tough love". Title meaning: A comment Bonnie makes while disposing of Ray's drugs and her excessive gratitude to the state trooper for not issuing a ticket.
| 91 | 3 | "A Seafaring Ancestor and a Bloomin' Onion" | James Widdoes | Story by : Susan McMartin & Anne Flett-Giordano; Teleplay by : Nick Bakay & Sheldon Bull & Britté Anchor | November 16, 2017 | T12.15703 | 8.39 |
Bonnie helps Natasha move into a rundown, unused apartment in her complex. When it comes time for Emily to move back in with her mother, Jill decides to quit feeling sorry for herself and be helpful. Meanwhile, Christy is assigned a younger partner named Cooper (Michael Angarano) for a law school project, and the two soon become romantically involved. Absent: William Fichtner as Adam Title meaning: A painting Bonnie hangs in Natasha's apartment and the prize that Christy and Cooper win in a bar trivia contest.
| 92 | 4 | "Fancy Crackers and Giant Women" | James Widdoes | Story by : Warren Bell & Marco Pennette; Teleplay by : Chuck Lorre & Eddie Gorodetsky & Gemma Baker | November 23, 2017 | T12.15704 | 7.89 |
Christy and Bonnie give up cable and internet in their home to help with financing Christy's college applications. Natasha tells the ladies about potentially being discovered for her singing-songwriting. Jill has a meltdown, prompting her to take action. Absent: William Fichtner as Adam Title meaning: Bonnie's description for Ritz crackers and the type of people Christy has challenging relationships with.
| 93 | 5 | "Poodle Fuzz and a Twinge of Jealousy" | James Widdoes | Story by : Marco Pennette & Anne Flett-Giordano; Teleplay by : Alissa Neubauer & Adam Chase | November 30, 2017 | T12.15705 | 8.59 |
Bonnie injures both ankles when she accidentally steps off a curb while talking on her cell phone with Christy. Bonnie experiences what it's like to be unable to walk, which helps her to better understand Adam. Christy fills in for her mom as the apartment complex manager and is surprised to learn that Bonnie does a lot of nice things for the tenants, even though she also has to deal with some of Bonnie's old worse self trying to leverage the injury for her own benefit. Title meaning: Something Adam finds in his ice cream and a line from a book that Christy reads to a blind tenant.
| 94 | 6 | "Smooth Jazz and a Weird Floaty Eye" | James Widdoes | Story by : Eddie Gorodetsky & Susan McMartin; Teleplay by : Nick Bakay & Sheldon Bull & Britté Anchor | December 7, 2017 | T12.15706 | 8.78 |
Adam tries to go meet with his visiting brother Patrick (Steven Weber) without telling Bonnie, who eventually finds out and wonders why Adam does not want her along. After inviting herself and Christy to the dinner meeting, Bonnie learns that Adam and Patrick have been at odds for years over business and emotional issues. Complicating things, Christy later strikes up a conversation with Patrick and the two go on a date. Title meaning: Bonnie's nickname for Christy's choice of driving music and one of Bonnie's snarky suggestions for why Adam is embarrassed by his brother.
| 95 | 7 | "Too Many Hippies and Huevos Rancheros" | James Widdoes | Story by : Nick Bakay & Susan McMartin; Teleplay by : Eddie Gorodetsky & Gemma Baker & Warren Bell | December 14, 2017 | T12.15707 | 8.65 |
As Christy tries to figure out where her relationship with Patrick is going now that he's returning home to Santa Cruz, the girls learn from Marjorie that Victor had a stroke and is in the hospital. Title meaning: Christy's comment about where Patrick lives and the room service meal that she steals for him.
| 96 | 8 | "An Epi-Pen and a Security Cat" | James Widdoes | Story by : Warren Bell & Adam Chase & Alissa Neubauer; Teleplay by : Nick Bakay & Marco Pennette & Anne Flett-Giordano | December 21, 2017 | T12.15708 | 8.85 |
Christy and Bonnie's house gets ransacked, where their stolen possessions includes the former's laptop containing her term paper. With Marjorie and Wendy's help, they locate a seller for the stolen contents through Craigslist, only to find Mary, one of their fellow meeting attendees, living there. Absent: Jaime Pressly as Jill and William Fichtner as Adam Title meaning: An item Bonnie stole when she herself broke into someone else's house nine years ago and Marjorie's suggestion to protect Christy and Bonnie from future break-ins.
| 97 | 9 | "Teenage Vampires and a White Russian" | James Widdoes | Story by : Nick Bakay & Alissa Neubauer; Teleplay by : Sheldon Bull & Anne Flett-Giordano & Michael Shipley | January 4, 2018 | T12.15709 | 9.88 |
Christy, Bonnie and Adam bail Ray out of jail after Ray calls Adam for being arrested for getting into a fight at a Warriors game. Bonnie intends to force him to get sober and go to Alcoholics Anonymous meetings, but Ray insists that he gets cleaned up his way and stays with Adam, only to resort to using cocaine again. Meanwhile, Christy fights to get her job back after the snippy new manager at the restaurant gets fed up with her tardiness and fires her. Absent: Jaime Pressly as Jill Title meaning: Bonnie's subject in her young adult novel idea and the drink Geoffrey (Christy's new boss) orders at the bar where Adam hangs out.
| 98 | 10 | "A Bear and a Bladder Infection" | James Widdoes | Story by : Eddie Gorodetsky & Marco Pennette & Britté Anchor; Teleplay by : Gemma Baker & Adam Chase & Susan McMartin | January 11, 2018 | T12.15710 | 9.54 |
Although she still wants to make the long-distance relationship with Patrick work, Christy hooks up with Cooper after running into him at school. Christy continues to see Cooper but considers it a sex-only relationship, while it becomes clear that Cooper thinks it's more, and Marjorie points out that Christy needs to stop trying to make everyone like her all the time. Meanwhile, Bonnie tries to give up coffee with little success. Absent: Jaime Pressly as Jill Title meaning: Bonnie's taunts and warnings about Christy's attempting to date both Cooper and Patrick.
| 99 | 11 | "Bert and Ernie and a Blessing of the People" | James Widdoes | Story by : Marco Pennette & Michael Shipley & Britté Anchor; Teleplay by : Adam Chase & Alissa Neubauer & Susan McMartin | January 18, 2018 | T12.15711 | 9.26 |
Christy travels to Santa Cruz to surprise Patrick and tell him that she wants to start a real relationship, but their attempts to be physical together fall flat. Meanwhile, Bonnie and Adam attend a wedding together, which starts an argument over what they want for their own wedding. Absent: Mimi Kennedy as Marjorie, Jaime Pressly as Jill and Beth Hall as Wendy Title meaning: Christy's idea of a couple that sleeps together without having sex and the Catholic wedding ceremony that Bonnie and Adam attend.
| 100 | 12 | "Push-Down Coffee and a Working Turn Signal" | James Widdoes | Story by : Chuck Lorre & Nick Bakay; Teleplay by : Eddie Gorodetsky & Gemma Baker | February 1, 2018 | T12.15712 | 9.11 |
Christy's car dies on the way home from Patrick's house and Bonnie refuses to let Adam loan her money for a new vehicle so Christy turns to someone she knows in the car business for help. Special guest star: Matt Jones as Baxter Absent: Jaime Pressly as Jill Title meaning: Christy's description of Patrick's Kona coffeemaker and a feature on her new car.
| 101 | 13 | "Pudding and a Screen Door" | James Widdoes | Story by : Eddie Gorodetsky & Adam Chase & Susan McMartin; Teleplay by : Nick Bakay & Gemma Baker & Britté Anchor | March 1, 2018 | T12.15713 | 9.01 |
Jill comes back from her weight loss retreat as a new and improved woman. When Jill decides that she will no longer pay for the group's meals because it symbolizes buying their affection, Bonnie becomes upset. Meanwhile, Christy receives some disappointing news that will affect her future plans. Title meaning: Bonnie's go-to dessert and Christy's snarky remark that she and Bonnie do not have a screen door.
| 102 | 14 | "Charlotte Brontë and a Backhoe" | James Widdoes | Story by : Marco Pennette & Adam Chase & Susan McMartin; Teleplay by : Nick Bakay & Warren Bell & Britté Anchor | March 8, 2018 | T12.15714 | 9.06 |
Jill introduces the group to her "inner strength" coach Miranda (Kristin Chenoweth). After witnessing Miranda help Wendy assert herself, Christy approaches Miranda to help with her depression over her law school rejections. Meanwhile, Jill still struggles with controlling herself from overeating, so she tries to use Miranda's advice and has some success but also tries to apply it elsewhere with disastrous results. Absent: William Fichtner as Adam Title meaning: A poet that Bonnie thinks is one of Christy's college teachers and Bonnie's response when Miranda instructs her not to operate heavy equipment after treatment.
| 103 | 15 | "Esta Loca and a Little Klingon" | Lea Thompson | Story by : Sheldon Bull & Susan McMartin; Teleplay by : Alissa Neubauer & Anne Flett-Giordano & Michael Shipley | March 29, 2018 | T12.15715 | 8.56 |
Jill's everyday relapses cause a strain in Christy and Patrick's relationship when the latter arrives over the weekend to celebrate his 54th birthday. Title meaning: Soledad's (Jill's housekeeper) description of Jill in Spanish and Adam's metaphor for understanding Christy and Bonnie's Alcoholics Anonymous jargon.
| 104 | 16 | "Eight Cats and the Hat Show" | James Widdoes | Story by : Nick Bakay & Alissa Neubauer & Adam Chase; Teleplay by : Eddie Gorodetsky & Gemma Baker & Warren Bell | April 5, 2018 | T12.15716 | 8.34 |
Christy accepts Jill's offer to take her on a shopping spree after Christy turns down Patrick's proposal and they break up, only to see Jill's ex-husband's new wife shopping as well. Meanwhile, Bonnie takes in a puppy to cheer Adam up after his dog passes away, only to find out that he is not ready to move on just yet. Title meaning: The number of cats Marjorie owns and Jill's snarky remark on James' (Jill's ex-husband) new wife trying on hats.
| 105 | 17 | "Crazy Snakes and a Clog to the Head" | James Widdoes | Story by : Susan McMartin & Anne Flett-Giordano; Teleplay by : Nick Bakay & Sheldon Bull & Michael Shipley | April 12, 2018 | T12.15717 | 8.94 |
When Christy and the group hold a meeting at a women's prison, Bonnie gets attacked by a woman named Tammy (Kristen Johnston). Soon she realizes Tammy was a foster sister in her past, when they were both teenagers. It is revealed that Tammy holds a grudge, saying that Bonnie ruined her life by getting her kicked out of her only decent foster home. First appearance of: Kristen Johnston as Tammy; Absent: William Fichtner as Adam Title meaning: Tammy's reminiscences of Bonnie and an injury Christy suffers during the prison meeting.
| 106 | 18 | "Spaghetti Sauce and a Dumpster Fire" | James Widdoes | Story by : Gemma Baker & Susan McMartin; Teleplay by : Anne Flett-Giordano & Michael Shipley | April 19, 2018 | T12.15718 | 8.82 |
Christy finds a new sponsor named Nora (Yvette Nicole Brown) after seeing Marjorie lose her temper at a deli clerk in the grocery store and later having a heated argument with her at a women's spa day. Christy later goes on a date with a guy she met casually only because she learned Patrick is dating someone new. Marjorie reveals she hasn't had a sponsor since hers relapsed almost a year ago and apologizes to Christy for her actions. Title meaning: What Bonnie asks Christy to buy at the grocery store and how Christy's new sponsor, Nora, describes a person that recovering alcoholics typically date.
| 107 | 19 | "A Taco Bowl and a Tubby Seamstress" | James Widdoes | Story by : Nick Bakay & Marco Pennette & Warren Bell; Teleplay by : Eddie Gorodetsky & Adam Chase & Alissa Neubauer | April 26, 2018 | T12.15719 | 8.31 |
When Bonnie clashes with new building owner Rita (Patti LuPone), who is the ex-wife of the previous owner Tony, Christy is worried that they might get kicked out of their apartment. Bonnie first refuses to do her job out of petulance and fear that she'll be doing menial labor for the rest of her life, but actually begins working hard after heeding advice from Marjorie and Christy. Bonnie later stands up to Rita when the owner demands Bonnie evict Mr. Munson, a blind Army veteran who is battling prostate cancer and is behind on his rent payments. Title meaning: What Bonnie is planning to eat in the bathroom of the bistro and how Rita describes the woman that her husband left her for.
| 108 | 20 | "Ocular Fluid and Fighting Robots" | James Widdoes | Story by : Gemma Baker & Adam Chase & Anne Flett-Giordano; Teleplay by : Sheldon Bull & Michael Shipley & Britté Anchor | May 3, 2018 | T12.15721 | 8.63 |
Nora tells Christy to accept the fact that she is choosing to live with Bonnie, and that she needs to be nice to her even when she is being a pain in the ass. Meanwhile, Bonnie thinks that "Fiancee Adam" is not making any effort in their relationship like "Boyfriend Adam" used to do. When Christy starts to do nice things for Bonnie without taking credit, Bonnie thinks it is Adam doing those things and that he really is making an effort. Christy becomes very angry when she sees Adam taking credit for the things she has done for Bonnie, but is also happy that the two have patched up their differences. Title meaning: Wendy's roommate describing a teenager who went to the ER and the movie that Adam wants to go see.
| 109 | 21 | "Phone Confetti and a Wee Dingle" | James Widdoes | Story by : Warren Bell & Marco Pennette & Susan McMartin; Teleplay by : Eddie Gorodetsky & Nick Bakay & Alissa Neubauer | May 10, 2018 | T12.15720 | 9.08 |
Bonnie and Adam have a weekend planned in Reno, but Adam suggests Bonnie take Christy as she is very depressed after learning Patrick got engaged. During a stop for ice cream, a police officer notices there are no plates on the car and later arrests Bonnie for having over $2000 in unpaid parking tickets. To get Bonnie out of jail, Christy goes to the nearest ATM after they get Adam to wire money to her account, but the ATM is in a casino and Christy gambles it away. She soon asks Jill for money, but loses that in the casino, too. Bonnie and the local cop bond over parenting issues and things sort of work out. Note: Allison Janney submitted this episode for consideration due to her nomination for the Primetime Emmy Award for Outstanding Lead Actress in a Comedy Series at the 70th Primetime Emmy Awards. Title meaning: Christy being swayed by the casino and Bonnie's description of Patrick's private parts.
| 110 | 22 | "Diamond Earrings and a Pumpkin Head" | James Widdoes | Story by : Eddie Gorodetsky & Sheldon Bull & Susan McMartin; Teleplay by : Warren Bell & Marco Pennette & Alissa Neubauer | May 10, 2018 | T12.15722 | 7.97 |
Christy is celebrating both five years sober and her college graduation. The ladies get her diamond earrings as a graduation gift. The next night, Chef Rudy talks Christy into a poker game where she proceeds to lose her tip money and the earrings. Bonnie blows up at Christy during her graduation party when she finds out. Christy grudgingly has to admit she needs help for her gambling addiction. After the ladies' next AA meeting, she walks down the hall to a Gamblers Anonymous meeting. Upon returning home, Christy opens a letter and learns she got into law school. Special guest star: French Stewart as Chef Rudy Title meaning: What the ladies give Christy as a graduation gift and what Bonnie calls Christy during a banter.

== Ratings ==
Viewership and ratings per episode of Mom season 5
| No. | Title | Air date | Rating/share (18–49) | Viewers (millions) |
|---|---|---|---|---|
| 1 | "Twinkle Lights and Grandma Shoes" | November 2, 2017 | 1.4/5 | 8.46 |
| 2 | "Fish Town and Too Many Thank You's" | November 9, 2017 | 1.5/6 | 8.69 |
| 3 | "A Seafaring Ancestor and a Bloomin' Onion" | November 16, 2017 | 1.4/5 | 8.39 |
| 4 | "Fancy Crackers and Giant Women" | November 23, 2017 | 1.8/7 | 7.89 |
| 5 | "Poodle Fuzz and a Twinge of Jealousy" | November 30, 2017 | 1.4/5 | 8.59 |
| 6 | "Smooth Jazz and a Weird Floaty Eye" | December 7, 2017 | 1.4/5 | 8.78 |
| 7 | "Too Many Hippies and Huevos Rancheros" | December 14, 2017 | 1.4/6 | 8.65 |
| 8 | "An Epi-Pen and a Security Cat" | December 21, 2017 | 1.4/6 | 8.85 |
| 9 | "Teenage Vampires and a White Russian" | January 4, 2018 | 1.7/6 | 9.88 |
| 10 | "A Bear and a Bladder Infection" | January 11, 2018 | 1.6/6 | 9.54 |
| 11 | "Bert and Ernie and a Blessing of the People" | January 18, 2018 | 1.6/6 | 9.26 |
| 12 | "Push-Down Coffee and a Working Turn Signal" | February 1, 2018 | 1.5/6 | 9.11 |
| 13 | "Pudding and a Screen Door" | March 1, 2018 | 1.5/6 | 9.01 |
| 14 | "Charlotte Brontë and a Backhoe" | March 8, 2018 | 1.5/6 | 9.06 |
| 15 | "Esta Loca and a Little Klingon" | March 29, 2018 | 1.4/6 | 8.56 |
| 16 | "Eight Cats and the Hat Show" | April 5, 2018 | 1.3/5 | 8.34 |
| 17 | "Crazy Snakes and a Clog to the Head" | April 12, 2018 | 1.4/6 | 8.94 |
| 18 | "Spaghetti Sauce and a Dumpster Fire" | April 19, 2018 | 1.4/5 | 8.82 |
| 19 | "A Taco Bowl and a Tubby Seamstress" | April 26, 2018 | 1.3/5 | 8.31 |
| 20 | "Ocular Fluid and Fighting Robots" | May 3, 2018 | 1.4/6 | 8.63 |
| 21 | "Phone Confetti and a Wee Dingle" | May 10, 2018 | 1.5/6 | 9.08 |
| 22 | "Diamond Earrings and a Pumpkin Head" | May 10, 2018 | 1.3/6 | 7.97 |
