= Mom season 8 =

Season of television series

Mom
- Season 8
- DVD cover
- Starring: Allison Janney; Mimi Kennedy; Jaime Pressly; Beth Hall; William Fichtner; Kristen Johnston
- No. of episodes: 18

Release
- Original network: CBS
- Original release: November 5, 2020 – May 13, 2021

Season chronology
- ← Previous; Season 7

The eighth and final season of the situational comedy drama Mom premiered November 5, 2020 on CBS in the United States. The season is produced by Chuck Lorre Productions and Warner Bros. Television, with series creators Chuck Lorre, Eddie Gorodetsky and Gemma Baker serving as executive producer. This is the only season not to feature Anna Faris.

Bonnie (Allison Janney) must learn to adjust without her daughter and former roommate, Christy, around. With her chaotic past behind her and a newly empty nest, she focuses on her marriage to her husband, Adam (William Fichtner), and on what she wants to be now that she has finally grown up. Now more than ever, Bonnie depends on the support of her friends, including the wise Marjorie (Mimi Kennedy), the wealthy and sometimes misguided Jill (Jaime Pressly), the overly emotional Wendy (Beth Hall) and her loudmouthed but sweet former foster sister, Tammy (Kristen Johnston). Collectively, they help each other overcome their mistakes and stay sober in the face of whatever life throws at them. The episodes are usually titled with two odd topics that are mentioned in that episode.

As of May 13, 2021, 170 episodes of Mom have aired, concluding the eighth season and the series.

== Cast ==
=== Main ===
- Allison Janney as Bonnie Plunkett
- Mimi Kennedy as Marjorie Armstrong-Perugian
- Jaime Pressly as Jill Kendall
- Beth Hall as Wendy Harris
- William Fichtner as Adam Janikowski
- Kristen Johnston as Tammy Diffendorf

=== Recurring ===
- Lauri Johnson as Beatrice
- Will Sasso as Andy
- Rainn Wilson as Trevor Wells
- French Stewart as Chef Rudy
- Reggie de Leon as Paul
- Chiquita Fuller as Taylor

=== Special guest stars ===
- Kevin Dunn as Gary
- Steve Valentine as Rod Knaughton
- Kevin Pollak as Alvin Lester Biletnikoff
- Tyne Daly as Barbara
- Bob Odenkirk as Hank
- Dan Bucatinsky as Arthur
- Melanie Lynskey as Shannon
- Rondi Reed as Jolene

=== Guest stars ===
- Rebecca Metz as Bobbi
- Natasha Hall as Shawn
- Jane Carr as Betty
- Kiff VandenHeuvel as Zeke
- Rob Brownstein as Dr. Mekizian
- Melody Butiu as Lorena
- Asante Jones as Corey
- Susan Chuang as Luanne
- Mark Fite as Wendell
- Virginia Montero as Marta
- Hermie Castillo as Josh
- David Theune as Lou
- Stephen Monroe Taylor as Darryl
- Malcom Foster Smith as Mookie
- Sonya Leslie as Nancy
- Matt Cedeño as Vincent
- Galen Hooks as Melinda
- Sandy Martin as Lillian
- Lilli Birdsell as Lydia
- Wallace Langham as Jerry
- Marcuis W. Harris as Clayton
- George Anthony Bell as Justice of the Peace

== Episodes ==
No. overall	No. in season	Title	Directed by	Written by	Original release date	Prod. code	U.S. viewers (millions)
153	1	"Sex Bucket and the Grammar Police"	James Widdoes	Teleplay by : Alissa Neubauer & Adam Chase & Ilana Wernick; Story by : Gemma Baker & Anne Flett-Giordano & Chelsea Myers	November 5, 2020	T12.16601	4.82
When Christy leaves for the East Coast to attend law school, the women plan a surprise slumber party in honor of Tammy's birthday that becomes somewhat tense when Marjorie reveals a health problem. Meanwhile, Wendy is troubled by something that she did while working as an ER nurse and Tammy is upset because her father is looking to make contact with her from prison. Title meaning: One of Jill's slumber party games and Bonnie's remark about grammar not mattering to drunk people when Marjorie questions the grammatical sense of the game “Never Have I Ever”.
154	2	"Smitten Kitten and a Tiny Boo-Boo Error"	James Widdoes	Teleplay by : Gemma Baker & Ilana Wernick & Anne Flett-Giordano; Story by : Alissa Neubauer & Adam Chase & Chelsea Myers	November 12, 2020	T12.16602	5.21
The group and Adam are not feeling very welcome towards Marjorie's critical, complaining, and rambling new love interest Gary, who has arrived from Chicago. But his emotional AA share gives everyone, especially Bonnie, an understanding of why Marjorie is falling for him. Meanwhile, Jill accidentally donates a huge sum to charity and feels some Tammy-prompted guilt over clawing back much of it, before eventually doing the right thing. Title meaning: How Marjorie describes herself feeling about Gary and what Jill calls her mistake after she accidentally donates too much money.
155	3	"Tang and a Safe Space for Everybody"	James Widdoes	Story by : Nick Bakay & Sheldon Bull & Chandra Thomas; Teleplay by : Warren Bell & Susan McMartin & Britté Anchor	November 19, 2020	T12.16603	5.07
Bonnie is shocked when rocker Rod Knaughton from the semi-successful 1980s band Sachet does a share at the meeting. Having spent "four nights" with him 30-some years ago, Bonnie reintroduces herself, but is disappointed when Rod doesn't remember her. After making fun of him, Bonnie goes to Rod's house to make amends and learns he lives with his mother and has been sober longer than he let on. She then agrees to be Rod's sponsor. Meanwhile, Tammy wants to make modifications to Bonnie's and Adam's apartment upon seeing Adam struggle to reach cereal on an upper shelf, only to learn the building's owner forbids it. Title meaning: A beverage Rod's mother offers to Bonnie and Jill and Marjorie's description of AA meetings after chastising Bonnie for possibly threatening Rod's sobriety.
156	4	"Astronauts and Fat Trimmings"	James Widdoes	Story by : Susan McMartin & Britté Anchor & Chandra Thomas; Teleplay by : Nick Bakay & Warren Bell & Sheldon Bull	December 3, 2020	T12.16604	5.32
Bonnie and Adam's relationship is going so well (and annoying the rest of the group so thoroughly) that they decide to try and help out when they observe a lot of tension between Jill and Andy, but Andy ultimately decides that he and Jill need to go on a break. Meanwhile, Tammy lends a hand to the recently-fired Chef Rudy as he starts a new food truck business, and sparks ignite anew between them. Title meaning: Marjorie trying to correct Tammy's idea about how backwards things were in 1959 and Andy separating prime tri-tip from its fat and gristle, much to Jill's disgust.
157	5	"Sober Wizard and a Woodshop Workshop"	James Widdoes	Story by : Warren Bell & Ilana Wernick & Anne Flett-Giordano; Teleplay by : Gemma Baker & Alissa Neubauer & Adam Chase	December 17, 2020	T12.16605	4.59
Adam's excitement at going skiing for the first time since the accident that paralyzed him provokes Bonnie's deep fear of losing those close to her, but a dream visit from Alvin reassures her. Meanwhile, Jill copes with Andy's request for a break in their relationship by helping Tammy with a teen girls' mentoring program. However, the girls get hooked onto Jill dramatizing everything, and she ends up using them as a makeshift service to get back at Andy on social media. This leaves Tammy worried that Jill is sending the wrong message. Title meaning: Bonnie's name for Marjorie while soliciting advice and one of the vocational training areas that Tammy leads at the girls' charity.
158	6	"Woo-Woo Lights and an Onside Kick"	James Widdoes	Story by : Warren Bell & Sheldon Bull & Nadiya Chettiar; Teleplay by : Nick Bakay & Susan McMartin & Britté Anchor	January 21, 2021	T12.16606	5.02
Jill suspects Andy's hesitance to end his "break" from her is because he's started a relationship with his new female cop partner, so she enlists Bonnie (and later Tammy and Wendy) to conduct a surveillance operation. While it confirms Andy isn't cheating on her, Jill's night still ends in heartbreak. Title meaning: Jill's term for a police siren and a football game Adam keeps talking about which infuriates Bonnie.
159	7	"S'Mores and a Sadness Cocoon"	James Widdoes	Story by : Gemma Baker & Ilana Wernick & Chandra Thomas; Teleplay by : Warren Bell & Alissa Neubauer & Adam Chase	February 11, 2021	T12.16607	5.45
Bonnie's appreciation of an RV Adam says he "borrowed" turns into white-hot anger towards him when he admits he bought it without consulting her. After a week's worth of fighting, Adam apologizes and Bonnie accepts. Jill looks forward to an appointment with her elderly father figure of a dentist but is devastated to find out he's only got a few months left until he retires. Title meaning: Bonnie's craving after spending time outside the RV and Jill's term for time spent grieving her relationship with Andy.
160	8	"Bloody Stumps and a Chemical Smell"	James Widdoes	Story by : Nick Bakay & Susan McMartin & Britté Anchor; Teleplay by : Sheldon Bull & Anne Flett-Giordano & Nadiya Chettiar	February 18, 2021	T12.16608	5.34
Bonnie keeps coming up with weird hobbies to take place in the upstairs bedroom, and with some help from Adam and therapist Trevor (who exchanges a little friendly banter with Jill) she comes to terms with her focus on the room being a reminder that Christy isn't coming back. Elsewhere, Tammy goes to Al-Anon at Adam's suggestion when Marjorie becomes impossible to live with, and the women later resolve their differences. Title meaning: Adam using a metaphor for avoiding conflict with Bonnie, and Trevor's olfactory reaction to a paper-mache lampshade Bonnie made for him.
161	9	"Whip-Its and Emotionally Attuned Babies"	James Widdoes	Story by : Warren Bell & Adam Chase & Chelsea Myers; Teleplay by : Gemma Baker & Alissa Neubauer & Ilana Wernick	February 25, 2021	T12.16609	5.18
Jill runs into Trevor at her juice store, and the two flirt heavily. Jill confides to Marjorie that she wants to date Trevor, while Trevor tells his therapist about his feelings for Jill. Both are told a relationship is forbidden as long as Trevor is treating Bonnie. Trevor ultimately meets Jill and uncovers some deep emotional issues that might explain her attraction to him. Meanwhile, Bonnie creates some non-alcoholic "mocktails" for the menu at Adam's bar, but later realizes her excitement over mixing mocktails is eerily similar to how she once felt preparing real cocktails. Title meaning: Tammy reminiscing after seeing Bonnie spray whipped cream on a mocktail and Jill pondering the kind of children that she and Trevor would create.
162	10	"Illegal Eels and the Cantaloupe Man"	James Widdoes	Story by : Susan McMartin & Ilana Wernick & Britté Anchor; Teleplay by : Alissa Neubauer & Adam Chase & Sheldon Bull	March 4, 2021	T12.16610	5.28
Adam and Bonnie are ready for their first romantic Valentine's Day together since they got married, but the rest of the group is either out of the romance scene (Jill and Tammy) or getting crushed by it (Marjorie and Wendy). Marjorie is left downtrodden after Gary breaks up with her by text and she later falls and fractures her wrist, while everyone is intrigued by Wendy's hospital romance until they find out her "boyfriend" is a cardiologist who's married and cheating with her. Everyone ends up at dinner with Bonnie and Adam, where Adam gives Bonnie a heart-warming gift and they all declare that they love each other. Title meaning: A trafficking activity that landed Bonnie in jail and the guy at the farmers' market Marjorie makes a date with after being dumped by Gary.
163	11	"Strutting Peacock and Father O'Leary"	Rebecca Ancheta Blum	Story by : Sheldon Bull & Susan McMartin & Britté Anchor; Teleplay by : Nick Bakay & Anne Flett-Giordano & Nadiya Chettiar	March 11, 2021	T12.16611	4.67
Adam is a speaker at a combined Al-Anon/AA meeting, and much to Bonnie's chagrin, ends up befriending her sponsee Rod. Bonnie becomes furious at Adam after Rod reveals he would prefer to have a male sponsor, as he is not himself when around women. This is emphasized when Jill continuously encounters Rod and they exchange snarky remarks, but that doesn't stop them from sleeping together. In the end, Bonnie introduces Rod to Marjorie in hopes that she will be his sponsor. Title meaning: What Jill calls Rod when the group is observing him and Adam at the bistro and an alcoholic Adam refers to during his share.
164	12	"Tiny Dancer and an Impromptu Picnic"	Nick Bakay	Story by : Nick Bakay & Sheldon Bull & Chelsea Myers; Teleplay by : Susan McMartin & Britté Anchor & Nadiya Chettiar	April 1, 2021	T12.16612	5.00
Bonnie is shocked and appalled when Adam drives her to see a huge billboard for a local strip club that features an R-rated, 20-year old picture of Christy. When the club owner (Bob Odenkirk) refuses to remove it, Bonnie sets out to take action, while Marjorie worries that she'll end up in trouble. Elsewhere, Rod and Adam discuss treating women with respect, which inspires Rod to reach out to Jill; Jill and he end up nearly having sex again. Also, Marjorie has to get one of her stubborn cats on a regimen of exercise when he is diagnosed as pre-diabetic. Title meaning: The song that the strip club owner suggested to then-stripper Christy and the erotic event Bonnie had planned for Adam.
165	13	"Klondike-Five and a Secret Family"	James Widdoes	Story by : Adam Chase & Susan McMartin & Anne Flett-Giordano; Teleplay by : Nick Bakay & Warren Bell & Robyn Morrison	April 8, 2021	T12.16613	4.93
When Bonnie finds Adam's list of his past bad behaviors with women, she encourages him to start making amends, but he spirals downward when he learns one of the women he mistreated has died. Adam opens up to Marjorie about why he's so upset before mending things with Bonnie, and beginning to address his past. Elsewhere, Tammy finds herself debating the nature of amends with a depressed manager at the steakhouse she'd robbed. Title meaning: Bonnie's sarcastic idea of Marjorie making amends via obsolete phone methods, and one of the things Bonnie wonders if Adam is upset about regarding his amends list.
166	14	"Endorphins and a Toasty Tushy"	James Widdoes	Story by : Alissa Neubauer & Sheldon Bull & Britté Anchor; Teleplay by : Gemma Baker & Ilana Wernick & Nadiya Chettiar & Matthew McGeehan	April 15, 2021	T12.16614	5.35
Tammy needs a truck for her burgeoning contractor business and brings Bonnie with her to buy one. But after Tammy buys an expensive truck outright with cash on hand, Bonnie starts to feel like a failure and is both jealous of Tammy's success and upset by her jealousy. Eventually, Bonnie admits how she feels to Tammy and later gets Tammy a big rate increase on a kitchen job, leading the two of them to agree to go into business together. Elsewhere, Wendy's enthusiasm for a dance class despite her bad dancing helps Jill realize that she has missed out on a lot of good things because of her perfectionism; Jill then pays Andy a visit where she gives him a (poorly made) piece of pottery and tells him that their time together wasn't perfect – but it was wonderful and she has no regrets about any of it. Title meaning: Jill's post-dance workout rush feeling and what Marjorie feels after Tammy turns on the seat warmers in her new truck. Trivia note: This was the 1st episode the show produced after being informed by CBS that Season 8 would be the show's last one.
167	15	"Vinyl Flooring and a Cartoon Bear"	James Widdoes	Story by : Gemma Baker & Alissa Neubauer & Sheldon Bull; Teleplay by : Ilana Wernick & Britté Anchor & Nadiya Chettiar & Alexandra Melnick	April 22, 2021	T12.16615	5.04
Bonnie and Tammy are very happy to start their new joint construction firm PlunkenDorf, but Tammy quickly becomes very uncomfortable with Bonnie's mix of stretching the truth and outright lying to get them jobs. When Tammy can't handle the lies anymore, she tells their first client the truth and he fires them, leading to a major argument between the women and a fracture in the group. Marjorie helps Bonnie see that she does not need to be the dishonest hustler anymore, and Adam tells Tammy that when Bonnie behaves in an objectionable manner, it is usually derived from good motives on her part. They go back to the client and a combination of honesty and their agreeing to spend time with his annoying mother-in-law gets them back to work. Elsewhere, Jill goes through the ups and downs of cutting sugar out of her diet, finally deciding that the "no sugar=smaller breasts" equation doesn't work for her. Title meaning: An item Bonnie is trying to price for PlunkenDorf, and how Tammy describes scratching her back on a 2x4 upon getting all-over hives when she's stressed about lying.
168	16	"Scooby-Doo Checks and Salisbury Steak"	James Widdoes	Story by : Nick Bakay & Warren Bell & Susan McMartin & Chandra Thomas; Teleplay by : Adam Chase & Anne Flett-Giordano & Emlyn Crenshaw	April 29, 2021	T12.16616	5.30
Bonnie is irritated by her therapist, Trevor's habit of seemingly ignoring their sessions. Bonnie is troubled that Adam does not value kissing her. She also reacts negatively upon learning that Trevor is considering a reunion with his ex-wife, who was unfaithful to him and left him devastated in their divorce. After he later admits that he still has feelings for a girl he loved in high school who barely knew him, he is able to call her and ask her out. During a visit to her bank, Jill runs into Andy, right before it is held up by bank robbers. During that crisis, they both admit to each other that they miss each other, resulting in a passionate kiss. After the siege has ended, they resolve to give their relationship another try. While Adam is not pleased that Bonnie will be without a therapist for three months due to Trevor's sabbatical, he gives Bonnie a kiss that makes her very happy. Title meaning: A new style of personal checks Andy is considering at the bank, and the Lean Cuisine meal Trevor eats to get into shape for his possible reunion with his ex-wife.
169	17	"A Community Hero and a Wide Turn"	James Widdoes	Story by : Gemma Baker & Alissa Neubauer & Ilana Wernick & Anne Flett-Giordano; Teleplay by : Sheldon Bull & Britté Anchor & Nadiya Chettiar	May 6, 2021	T12.16617	5.29
Marjorie is being honored as a Napa Valley "community hero" and her mistaken belief that Bonnie nominated her leads her in turn to ask Bonnie to be her presenter at the ceremony. Bonnie plans a roast-like speech, which Adam thinks is a very bad idea. At the gala, the group starts having some issues: Jill is feeling very queasy, Wendy's brave wearing of a strapless dress leads to an embarrassing nip-slip incident, and Tammy is bouncing between taking care of Jill and flirting with their party's handsome limo driver. As a result, Marjorie is off taking care of her friends when Bonnie gets to the stage, and Bonnie ends up completely discarding her plan to roast Marjorie and instead speaks emotionally (and beautifully) about how good a person Marjorie is, and how she saved Bonnie's life and is the mother she never really had. Marjorie later learns this and ends up doubly touched when her son Jerry shows up late to the ceremony (he had car trouble) and tells Marjorie that he not only loves her as a mom but that he was the one who nominated her for the community hero award. Jill discovers that her nausea was due to her being pregnant: she tells Andy and he's overjoyed for her and for him getting to be a dad. Tammy helps the limo guy drive everyone home, with chaotic results. Title meaning: The award that Marjorie is receiving, and the key to successful limo driving that Tammy is learning with some difficulty to get right.
170	18	"My Kinda People and the Big To-Do"	James Widdoes	Chuck Lorre & Nick Bakay & Gemma Baker & Warren Bell	May 13, 2021	T12.16618	6.17
The latest women's AA meeting sees the arrival of Shannon, who is not impressed with the stories she hears about how well everyone's life is going and walks out into the rain. Bonnie runs outside and gets Shannon to agree to join her for coffee, where the group both shocks and impresses Shannon with their tales of past jail time, fractured family relationships, and homelessness. Adam tells Bonnie that his doctor saw a possible malignancy in his chest X-ray and he needs a further exam to see if he has lung cancer. Bonnie calls Marjorie to discuss the devastating news but she also gets phone calls from Shannon (who is fighting with her meth-abusing mother Jolene) and Jill (who is marrying Andy the next day at the local courthouse) and can barely keep all the information together. Bonnie and Adam find out he does have lung cancer but it's early and treatable. They meet up with the group at the courthouse where Jill and Andy get married. Everyone then goes to a meeting where Bonnie makes a heartfelt speech about how she's no longer afraid of abusing drugs and alcohol and has begun thinking of other people first, concluding that she is truly a grateful alcoholic. She sits down, and Wendy goes up to the front and asks "Who else would like to share?". Title meaning: Bonnie relating to a description of Shannon's mean addict mom and the atmosphere around Jill's wedding.

== Ratings ==
Viewership and ratings per episode of Mom season 8
No.	Title	Air date	Rating (18–49)	Viewers (millions)	DVR (18–49)	DVR viewers (millions)	Total (18–49)	Total viewers (millions)
1	"Sex Bucket and the Grammar Police"	November 5, 2020	0.6	4.82	0.4	2.10	1.0	6.92
2	"Smitten Kitten and a Tiny Boo-Boo Error"	November 12, 2020	0.6	5.21	0.4	2.00	1.0	7.21
3	"Tang and a Safe Space for Everybody"	November 19, 2020	0.6	5.07	—N/a	—N/a	—N/a	—N/a
4	"Astronauts and Fat Trimmings"	December 3, 2020	0.7	5.32	0.3	1.78	1.0	7.10
5	"Sober Wizard and a Woodshop Workshop"	December 17, 2020	0.5	4.59	—N/a	—N/a	—N/a	—N/a
6	"Woo-Woo Lights and an Onside Kick"	January 21, 2021	0.6	5.02	—N/a	—N/a	—N/a	—N/a
7	"S'Mores and a Sadness Cocoon"	February 11, 2021	0.7	5.45	0.3	1.91	1.0	7.36
8	"Bloody Stumps and a Chemical Smell"	February 18, 2021	0.7	5.34	0.3	1.88	1.0	7.22
9	"Whip-Its and Emotionally Attuned Babies"	February 25, 2021	0.7	5.18	0.3	1.88	1.0	7.06
10	"Illegal Eels and the Cantaloupe Man"	March 4, 2021	0.7	5.28	0.3	1.81	1.0	7.09
11	"Strutting Peacock and Father O'Leary"	March 11, 2021	0.5	4.67	0.3	1.76	0.8	6.43
12	"Tiny Dancer and an Impromptu Picnic"	April 1, 2021	0.6	5.00	TBD	TBD	TBD	TBD
13	"Klondike-Five and a Secret Family"	April 8, 2021	0.6	4.93	0.3	1.90	0.9	6.83
14	"Endorphins and a Toasty Tushy"	April 15, 2021	0.6	5.35	TBD	TBD	TBD	TBD
15	"Vinyl Flooring and a Cartoon Bear"	April 22, 2021	0.6	5.04	0.3	1.83	0.9	6.87
16	"Scooby-Doo Checks and Salisbury Steak"	April 29, 2021	0.5	5.30	0.3	1.80	0.8	7.10
17	"A Community Hero and a Wide Turn"	May 6, 2021	0.6	5.29	0.3	1.69	0.9	6.98
18	"My Kinda People and the Big To-Do"	May 13, 2021	0.7	6.17	0.3	1.89	1.1	8.06
