= List of Mom episodes =

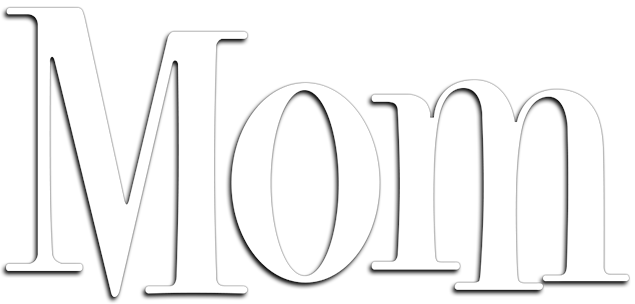

Mom is an American situational comedy drama that premiered on September 23, 2013, on CBS. The series was created by Chuck Lorre, Eddie Gorodetsky and Gemma Baker. It follows Christy Plunkett (Anna Faris), a single mother who, upon reaching a turning point in her battle with alcoholism and drug addiction, decides to restart her life in Napa, California's wine country, working as a waitress at the restaurant Rustic Fig and attending Alcoholics Anonymous meetings. Her mother Bonnie Plunkett (Allison Janney) is also a recovering drug and alcohol addict who attempts to have a healthy romantic relationship with her fiancé, Adam (William Fichtner), a paraplegic ex-stuntman; and her 17-year-old daughter Violet (Sadie Calvano) — born when Christy was just 16 – was herself pregnant by way of her boyfriend Luke (Spencer Daniels) in season 1. Christy also has a younger son Roscoe (Blake Garrett Rosenthal) by her ex-husband Baxter (Matt L. Jones), a deadbeat marijuana addict in the first season. Through it all, Christy and Bonnie rely on their support system from AA, including the wise Marjorie (Mimi Kennedy), the wealthy and sometimes misguided Jill (Jaime Pressly), the overly emotional Wendy (Beth Hall), and the loudmouth but sweet Tammy (Kristen Johnston). Collectively, they help each other stay sober in the face of whatever life throws at them. Recurring characters in the first few seasons include: Gabriel (Nate Corddry), the manager of Rustic Fig and Rudy (French Stewart), Rustic Fig’s head chef.

With the exception of the pilot, episode titles contain two odd topics (often unrelated) that are mentioned in that episode's dialogue. In February 2019, CBS renewed the series for a seventh and eighth season, with the seventh season which premiered on September 26, 2019. The eighth season premiered on November 5, 2020. On February 17, 2021, it was announced that the eighth season would be the series' final season. During the course of the series, 170 episodes of Mom aired over eight seasons, between September 23, 2013, and May 13, 2021.

== Series overview ==
Season	Episodes	Originally released		Rank	Viewers (in millions)
Season	Episodes	First released	Last released	Rank	Viewers (in millions)
1	22	September 23, 2013	April 14, 2014	42	8.34
2	22	October 30, 2014	April 30, 2015	26	11.79
3	22	November 5, 2015	May 19, 2016	40	9.64
4	22	October 27, 2016	May 11, 2017	29	9.43
5	22	November 2, 2017	May 10, 2018	19	10.96
6	22	September 27, 2018	May 9, 2019	23	10.22
7	20	September 26, 2019	April 16, 2020	29	8.52
8	18	November 5, 2020	May 13, 2021	32	7.05

== Episodes ==
=== Season 1 (2013–14) ===
No. overall	No. in season	Title	Directed by	Written by	Original release date	Prod. code	U.S. viewers (millions)
1	1	"Pilot"	Pamela Fryman	Chuck Lorre & Eddie Gorodetsky & Gemma Baker	September 23, 2013	276061	7.99
2	2	"A Pee Stick and an Asian Raccoon"	Gary Halvorson	Story by : Nick Bakay & Gemma Baker; Teleplay by : Chuck Lorre & Eddie Gorodetsky	September 30, 2013	4X5402	7.00
3	3	"A Small Nervous Meltdown and a Misplaced Fork"	Gary Halvorson	Story by : Chuck Lorre & Eddie Gorodetsky; Teleplay by : Nick Bakay & Gemma Baker	October 7, 2013	4X5403	6.86
4	4	"Loathing and Tube Socks"	Jeff Greenstein	Story by : Eddie Gorodetsky & Gemma Baker; Teleplay by : Chuck Lorre & Nick Bakay	October 14, 2013	4X5404	7.44
5	5	"Six Thousand Bootleg T-Shirts and a Prada Handbag"	James Widdoes	Story by : Chuck Lorre & Nick Bakay; Teleplay by : Eddie Gorodetsky & Gemma Baker	October 21, 2013	4X5405	7.28
6	6	"Abstinence and Pudding"	Jeff Greenstein	Story by : Nick Bakay & Gemma Baker; Teleplay by : Chuck Lorre & Eddie Gorodetsky	October 28, 2013	4X5406	6.64
7	7	"Estrogen and a Hearty Breakfast"	James Widdoes	Story by : Eddie Gorodetsky & Gemma Baker; Teleplay by : Chuck Lorre & Nick Bakay & Alissa Neubauer	November 4, 2013	4X5407	7.38
8	8	"Big Sur and Strawberry Lube"	Jeff Greenstein	Story by : Chuck Lorre & Eddie Gorodetsky & Alissa Neubauer; Teleplay by : Nick Bakay & Gemma Baker & Christine Zander	November 11, 2013	4X5408	6.96
9	9	"Zombies and Cobb Salad"	Betsy Thomas	Story by : Nick Bakay & Christine Zander & Alissa Neubauer; Teleplay by : Chuck Lorre & Eddie Gorodetsky & Gemma Baker	November 18, 2013	4X5409	6.82
10	10	"Belgian Waffles and Bathroom Privileges"	Jeff Greenstein	Story by : Chuck Lorre & Christine Zander & Alissa Neubauer; Teleplay by : Eddie Gorodetsky & Nick Bakay & Gemma Baker	November 25, 2013	4X5410	7.36
11	11	"Cotton Candy and Blended Fish"	Jeff Greenstein	Story by : Chuck Lorre & Gemma Baker & Alissa Neubauer; Teleplay by : Eddie Gorodetsky & Nick Bakay	December 2, 2013	4X5412	7.68
12	12	"Corned Beef and Handcuffs"	Jon Cryer	Story by : Eddie Gorodetsky & Gemma Baker & Christine Zander; Teleplay by : Chuck Lorre & Nick Bakay & Alissa Neubauer	December 16, 2013	4X5411	7.44
13	13	"Hot Soup and Shingles"	Anthony Rich	Story by : Chuck Lorre & Hayley Mortison; Teleplay by : Eddie Gorodetsky & Nick Bakay	January 13, 2014	4X5413	8.50
14	14	"Leather Cribs and Medieval Rack"	Ted Wass	Story by : Eddie Gorodetsky & Alissa Neubauer & Sheldon Bull; Teleplay by : Chuck Lorre & Nick Bakay & Gemma Baker	January 20, 2014	4X5414	8.27
15	15	"Fireballs and Bullet Holes"	Ted Wass	Story by : Chuck Lorre & Nick Bakay; Teleplay by : Eddie Gorodetsky & Alissa Neubauer & Marco Pennette	January 27, 2014	4X5415	9.58
16	16	"Nietzsche and a Beer Run"	Ted Wass	Story by : Chuck Lorre; Teleplay by : Eddie Gorodetsky & Nick Bakay & Gemma Baker	February 3, 2014	4X5416	9.11
17	17	"Jail, Jail and Japanese Porn"	James Widdoes	Story by : Chuck Lorre & Eddie Gorodetsky; Teleplay by : Nick Bakay & Alissa Neubauer & Marco Pennette	February 24, 2014	4X5417	7.25
18	18	"Sonograms and Tube Tops"	Jeff Greenstein	Story by : Nick Bakay & Gemma Baker & Sheldon Bull; Teleplay by : Chuck Lorre & Eddie Gorodetsky & Marco Pennette	March 3, 2014	4X5418	8.42
19	19	"Toilet Wine and the Earl of Sandwich"	Jeff Greenstein	Story by : Chuck Lorre; Teleplay by : Gemma Baker & Alissa Neubauer	March 17, 2014	4X5419	7.05
20	20	"Clumsy Monkeys and a Tilted Uterus"	Jeff Greenstein	Story by : Chuck Lorre & Gemma Baker; Teleplay by : Alissa Neubauer & Marco Pennette	March 24, 2014	4X5420	7.35
21	21	"Broken Dreams and Blocked Arteries"	James Widdoes	Story by : Nick Bakay & Marco Pennette; Teleplay by : Chuck Lorre & Eddie Gorodetsky	March 31, 2014	4X5421	7.27
22	22	"Smokey Taylor and a Deathbed Confession"	Jeff Greenstein	Story by : Gemma Baker & Marco Pennette; Teleplay by : Chuck Lorre & Alissa Neubauer	April 14, 2014	4X5422	6.86

=== Season 2 (2014–15) ===
No. overall	No. in season	Title	Directed by	Written by	Original release date	Prod. code	U.S. viewers (millions)
23	1	"Hepatitis and Lemon Zest"	Ted Wass	Story by : Chuck Lorre & Eddie Gorodetsky; Teleplay by : Nick Bakay & Gemma Baker & Marco Pennette	October 30, 2014	4X6701	11.13
24	2	"Figgy Pudding and the Rapture"	Ted Wass	Story by : Chuck Lorre & Susan McMartin; Teleplay by : Alissa Neubauer & Sheldon Bull & Adam Chase	November 6, 2014	4X6702	10.80
25	3	"Chicken Nuggets and a Triple Homicide"	Ted Wass	Story by : Chuck Lorre & Mike Binder; Teleplay by : Eddie Gorodetsky & Alissa Neubauer & Adam Chase	November 13, 2014	4X6703	11.07
26	4	"Forged Resumes and the Recommended Dosage"	Ted Wass	Story by : Chuck Lorre & Nick Bakay; Teleplay by : Gemma Baker & Sheldon Bull & Marco Pennette	November 20, 2014	4X6704	10.19
27	5	"Kimchi and a Monkey Playing Harmonica"	Ted Wass	Story by : Chuck Lorre & Eddie Gorodetsky; Teleplay by : Susan McMartin & Sheldon Bull & Marco Pennette	November 27, 2014	4X6705	7.30
28	6	"Crazy Eyes and a Wet Brad Pitt"	Ted Wass	Story by : Gemma Baker & Alissa Neubauer & Adam Chase; Teleplay by : Chuck Lorre & Nick Bakay	December 4, 2014	4X6706	8.61
29	7	"Soapy Eyes and a Clean Slate"	Ted Wass	Story by : Chuck Lorre & Alissa Neubauer; Teleplay by : Gemma Baker & Marco Pennette & Adam Chase	December 11, 2014	4X6707	10.75
30	8	"Free Therapy and a Dead Lady's Yard Sale"	Ted Wass	Story by : Chuck Lorre & Susan McMartin; Teleplay by : Gemma Baker & Marco Pennette & Adam Chase	December 18, 2014	4X6708	10.01
31	9	"Godzilla and a Sprig of Mint"	Ted Wass	Story by : Chuck Lorre & Nick Bakay; Teleplay by : Eddie Gorodetsky & Alissa Neubauer & Sheldon Bull	January 8, 2015	4X6709	12.29
32	10	"Nudes and a Six Day Cleanse"	Jeff Greenstein	Story by : Alissa Neubauer & Sheldon Bull & Susan McMartin; Teleplay by : Marco Pennette & Adam Chase & Gemma Baker	January 15, 2015	4X6710	10.84
33	11	"Three Smiles and an Unpainted Ceiling"	Anthony Rich	Story by : Chuck Lorre & Eddie Gorodetsky; Teleplay by : Chuck Lorre & Eddie Gorodetsky & Nick Bakay	January 22, 2015	4X6711	11.05
34	12	"Kitty Litter and a Class A Felony"	Jeff Greenstein	Story by : Chuck Lorre & Eddie Gorodetsky & Marco Pennette; Teleplay by : Gemma Baker & Adam Chase & Susan McMartin	January 29, 2015	4X6712	11.78
35	13	"Cheeseburger Salad and Jazz"	Ted Wass	Story by : Chuck Lorre & Eddie Gorodetsky; Teleplay by : Nick Bakay & Alissa Neubauer & Sheldon Bull	February 5, 2015	4X6713	11.65
36	14	"Benito Poppins and a Warm Pumpkin"	Ted Wass	Story by : Nick Bakay & Britté Anchor; Teleplay by : Chuck Lorre & Alissa Neubauer & Susan McMartin	February 12, 2015	4X6714	10.22
37	15	"Turkey Meatballs and a Getaway Car"	Ted Wass	Story by : Eddie Gorodetsky & Marco Pennette & Susan McMartin; Teleplay by : Chuck Lorre & Nick Bakay & Gemma Baker & Adam Chase	February 26, 2015	4X6715	8.30
38	16	"Dirty Money and a Woman Named Mike"	Ted Wass	Story by : Chuck Lorre & Sheldon Bull; Teleplay by : Nick Bakay & Alissa Neubauer	March 5, 2015	4X6716	9.67
39	17	"A Commemorative Coin and a Misshapen Head"	Anthony Rich	Story by : Chuck Lorre & Susan McMartin; Teleplay by : Sheldon Bull & Adam Chase	March 12, 2015	4X6717	9.09
40	18	"Dropped Soap and a Big Guy on a Throne"	Anthony Rich	Story by : Chuck Lorre & Gemma Baker; Teleplay by : Eddie Gorodetsky & Nick Bakay & Susan McMartin	April 2, 2015	4X6718	8.62
41	19	"Mashed Potatoes and a Little Nitrous"	James Widdoes	Story by : Chuck Lorre & Marco Pennette; Teleplay by : Gemma Baker & Sheldon Bull & Susan McMartin	April 9, 2015	4X6719	9.03
42	20	"Sick Popes and a Red Ferrari"	James Widdoes	Story by : Alissa Neubauer & Adam Chase; Teleplay by : Chuck Lorre & Eddie Gorodetsky & Nick Bakay	April 16, 2015	4X6720	9.60
43	21	"Patient Zero and the Chocolate Fountain"	James Widdoes	Story by : Chuck Lorre & Eddie Gorodetsky & Nick Bakay & Marco Pennette; Teleplay by : Adam Chase & Gemma Baker & Susan McMartin	April 23, 2015	4X6721	9.01
44	22	"Fun Girl Stuff and Eternal Salvation"	James Widdoes	Story by : Alissa Neubauer & Sheldon Bull; Teleplay by : Chuck Lorre & Warren Bell	April 30, 2015	4X6722	8.78

=== Season 3 (2015–16) ===
No. overall	No. in season	Title	Directed by	Written by	Original release date	Prod. code	U.S. viewers (millions)
45	1	"Terrorists and Gingerbread"	James Widdoes	Story by : Chuck Lorre & Marco Pennette; Teleplay by : Gemma Baker & Adam Chase & Anne Flett-Giordano	November 5, 2015	4X7053	7.28
46	2	"Thigh Gap and a Rack of Lamb"	James Widdoes	Story by : Chuck Lorre & Marco Pennette; Teleplay by : Gemma Baker & Adam Chase & Anne Flett-Giordano	November 12, 2015	4X7052	7.16
47	3	"Mozzarella Sticks and a Gay Piano Bar"	James Widdoes	Story by : Chuck Lorre & Nick Bakay & Marco Pennette; Teleplay by : Gemma Baker & Sheldon Bull & Adam Chase	November 19, 2015	4X7056	7.46
48	4	"Sawdust and Brisket"	James Widdoes	Story by : Chuck Lorre & Nick Bakay; Teleplay by : Sheldon Bull & Susan McMartin & Sam Miller	November 26, 2015	4X7051	6.72
49	5	"A Pirate, Three Frogs and a Prince"	James Widdoes	Story by : Chuck Lorre & Warren Bell; Teleplay by : Eddie Gorodetsky & Alissa Neubauer & Michael Borkow	December 10, 2015	4X7055	6.87
50	6	"Horny-Goggles and a Catered Intervention"	James Widdoes	Story by : Susan McMartin; Teleplay by : Chuck Lorre, Nick Bakay & Sheldon Bull	December 17, 2015	4X7054	8.95
51	7	"Kreplach and a Tiny Tush"	Anthony Rich	Story by : Eddie Gorodetsky, Adam Chase & Warren Bell; Teleplay by : Chuck Lorre, Marco Pennette & Alissa Neubauer	January 7, 2016	4X7059	8.71
52	8	"Snickerdoodle and a Nip Slip"	James Widdoes	Story by : Chuck Lorre & Warren Bell; Teleplay by : Eddie Gorodetsky & Alissa Neubauer	January 14, 2016	4X7057	8.33
53	9	"My Little Pony and a Demerol Drip"	James Widdoes	Story by : Chuck Lorre, Nick Bakay & Sheldon Bull; Teleplay by : Gemma Baker, Marco Pennette & Adam Chase	January 21, 2016	4X7058	8.49
54	10	"Quaaludes and Crackerjack"	James Widdoes	Story by : Chuck Lorre, Sheldon Bull & Susan McMartin; Teleplay by : Nick Bakay & Warren Bell	February 4, 2016	4X7061	7.96
55	11	"Cinderella and a Drunk MacGyver"	James Widdoes	Story by : Chuck Lorre, Eddie Gorodetsky & Nick Bakay; Teleplay by : Alissa Neubauer, Warren Bell & Susan McMartin	February 11, 2016	4X7060	8.13
56	12	"Diabetic Lesbians and a Blushing Bride"	James Widdoes	Story by : Chuck Lorre, Marco Pennette, Adam Chase & Anne Flett-Giordano; Teleplay by : Eddie Gorodetsky, Gemma Baker & Alissa Neubauer	February 18, 2016	4X7062	8.68
57	13	"Sticky Hands and a Walk on the Wild Side"	James Widdoes	Story by : Chuck Lorre, Eddie Gorodetsky & Susan McMartin; Teleplay by : Nick Bakay, Warren Bell & Anne Flett-Giordano	February 25, 2016	4X7063	7.90
58	14	"Death, Death, Death and a Bucket of Chicken"	James Widdoes	Story by : Chuck Lorre, Warren Bell & Anne Flett-Giordano; Teleplay by : Gemma Baker & Alissa Neubauer	March 3, 2016	4X7065	7.98
59	15	"Nazi Zombies and a Two-Hundred Pound Baby"	James Widdoes	Story by : Chuck Lorre & Susan McMartin; Teleplay by : Adam Chase & Anne Flett-Giordano	March 10, 2016	4X7066	7.88
60	16	"Cornflakes and the Hair of Three Men"	James Widdoes	Story by : Chuck Lorre & Britté Anchor; Teleplay by : Marco Pennette & Susan McMartin	April 7, 2016	4X7064	7.17
61	17	"Caperberries and a Glass Eye"	Anthony Rich	Story by : Chuck Lorre & Eddie Gorodetsky; Teleplay by : Sheldon Bull & Warren Bell	April 14, 2016	4X7067	7.46
62	18	"Beast Mode and Old People Kissing"	James Widdoes	Story by : Chuck Lorre & Nick Bakay; Teleplay by : Gemma Baker, Adam Chase & Warren Bell	April 21, 2016	4X7068	8.31
63	19	"A Catheter and a Dipsy-Doodle"	James Widdoes	Story by : Chuck Lorre, Alissa Neubauer & Sheldon Bull; Teleplay by : Nick Bakay, Marco Pennette, Anne Flett-Giordano & Susan McMartin	April 28, 2016	4X7069	8.27
64	20	"Pure Evil and a Free Piece of Cheesecake"	James Widdoes	Story by : Chuck Lorre, Gemma Baker & Warren Bell; Teleplay by : Britté Anchor	May 5, 2016	4X7070	7.92
65	21	"Mahjong Sally and the Ecstasy"	James Widdoes	Story by : Chuck Lorre, Eddie Gorodetsky & Warren Bell; Teleplay by : Alissa Neubauer & Susan McMartin	May 12, 2016	4X7071	8.31
66	22	"Atticus Finch and the Downtrodden"	James Widdoes	Story by : Chuck Lorre, Nick Bakay & Sheldon Bull; Teleplay by : Gemma Baker, Adam Chase & Anne Flett-Giordano	May 19, 2016	4X7072	8.14

=== Season 4 (2016–17) ===
No. overall	No. in season	Title	Directed by	Written by	Original release date	Prod. code	U.S. viewers (millions)
67	1	"High-tops and Brown Jacket"	James Widdoes	Story by : Chuck Lorre & Gemma Baker; Teleplay by : Marco Pennette & Adam Chase & Susan McMartin	October 27, 2016	T12.15351	7.02
68	2	"Sword Fights and a Dominican Shortstop"	James Widdoes	Story by : Chuck Lorre; Teleplay by : Gemma Baker & Warren Bell & Sheldon Bull	November 3, 2016	T12.15352	6.85
69	3	"Sparkling Water and Ba-dinkers"	James Widdoes	Story by : Chuck Lorre & Eddie Gorodetsky & Nick Bakay; Teleplay by : Alissa Neubauer & Anne Flett-Giordano & Britté Anchor	November 10, 2016	T12.15353	7.10
70	4	"Curious George and the Big Red Nightmare"	James Widdoes	Story by : Chuck Lorre; Teleplay by : Sheldon Bull & Adam Chase & Warren Bell	November 17, 2016	T12.15354	7.64
71	5	"Blow and a Free McMuffin"	James Widdoes	Story by : Chuck Lorre & Susan McMartin & Anne Flett-Giordano; Teleplay by : Nick Bakay & Warren Bell	November 24, 2016	T12.15356	5.82
72	6	"Xanax and a Baby Duck"	Jon Cryer	Story by : Chuck Lorre & Warren Bell & Sheldon Bull; Teleplay by : Eddie Gorodetsky & Gemma Baker	December 1, 2016	T12.15361	7.01
73	7	"Cornbread and a Cashmere Onesie"	James Widdoes	Story by : Chuck Lorre & Gemma Baker; Teleplay by : Eddie Gorodetsky & Marco Pennette & Susan McMartin	December 8, 2016	T12.15355	7.48
74	8	"Freckled Bananas and a Little Schwinn"	James Widdoes	Story by : Chuck Lorre & Susan McMartin & Anne Flett-Giordano; Teleplay by : Nick Bakay & Alissa Neubauer & Britté Anchor	December 15, 2016	T12.15357	8.23
75	9	"Bad Hand and British Royalty"	James Widdoes	Story by : Chuck Lorre & Nick Bakay & Warren Bell; Teleplay by : Susan McMartin & Adam Chase & Anne Flett-Giordano	January 5, 2017	T12.15359	8.50
76	10	"A Safe Word and a Rib Eye"	Anthony Rich	Story by : Chuck Lorre & Alissa Neubauer; Teleplay by : Eddie Gorodetsky & Gemma Baker & Marco Pennette	January 12, 2017	T12.15358	7.39
77	11	"Good Karma and the Big Weird"	James Widdoes	Story by : Chuck Lorre & Alissa Neubauer & Susan McMartin; Teleplay by : Nick Bakay & Sheldon Bull & Adam Chase & Warren Bell	January 19, 2017	T12.15360	8.57
78	12	"Wind Chimes and a Bottomless Pit of Sadness"	James Widdoes	Story by : Gemma Baker & Sheldon Bull; Teleplay by : Adam Chase & Alissa Neubauer & Britté Anchor	February 2, 2017	T12.15362	8.71
79	13	"A Bouncy Castle and an Aneurysm"	James Widdoes	Story by : Gemma Baker; Teleplay by : Eddie Gorodetsky & Marco Pennette	February 9, 2017	T12.15363	7.56
80	14	"Roast Chicken and a Funny Story"	James Widdoes	Story by : Nick Bakay & Marco Pennette & Adam Chase; Teleplay by : Alissa Neubauer & Susan McMartin & Anne Flett-Giordano	February 16, 2017	T12.15364	7.87
81	15	"Night Swimmin' and an English Muffin"	James Widdoes	Story by : Eddie Gorodetsky & Gemma Baker; Teleplay by : Chuck Lorre & Warren Bell & Sheldon Bull	February 23, 2017	T12.15365	7.62
82	16	"Martinis and a Sponge Bath"	James Widdoes	Story by : Nick Bakay & Susan McMartin & Sheldon Bull; Teleplay by : Alissa Neubauer & Warren Bell & Adam Chase	March 9, 2017	T12.15366	7.50
83	17	"Black Mold and an Old Hot Dog"	Anthony Rich	Story by : Warren Bell & Sheldon Bull; Teleplay by : Gemma Baker & Anne Flett-Giordano & Britté Anchor	March 30, 2017	T12.15367	7.03
84	18	"Tush Push and Some Radishes"	James Widdoes	Story by : Marco Pennette & Susan McMartin; Teleplay by : Eddie Gorodetsky & Nick Bakay	April 6, 2017	T12.15368	7.50
85	19	"Tantric Sex and the Sprouted Flute"	James Widdoes	Story by : Eddie Gorodetsky, Nick Bakay & Gemma Baker; Teleplay by : Chuck Lorre, Sheldon Bull & Britté Anchor	April 13, 2017	T12.15369	6.84
86	20	"A Cricket and a Hedge Made of Gold"	James Widdoes	Story by : Gemma Baker, Susan McMartin & Adam Chase; Teleplay by : Marco Pennette, Alissa Neubauer & Anne Flett-Giordano	April 27, 2017	T12.15370	7.06
87	21	"A Few Thongs and a Hawaiian Funeral"	James Widdoes	Story by : Gemma Baker & Marco Pennette; Teleplay by : Alissa Neubauer & Adam Chase & Anne Flett-Giordano	May 4, 2017	T12.15371	8.18
88	22	"Lockjaw and a Liquid Diet"	James Widdoes	Story by : Susan McMartin & Sheldon Bull; Teleplay by : Eddie Gorodetsky & Nick Bakay	May 11, 2017	T12.15372	8.12

=== Season 5 (2017–18) ===
No. overall	No. in season	Title	Directed by	Written by	Original release date	Prod. code	U.S. viewers (millions)
89	1	"Twinkle Lights and Grandma Shoes"	James Widdoes	Story by : Nick Bakay & Gemma Baker; Teleplay by : Adam Chase & Marco Pennette & Anne Flett-Giordano	November 2, 2017	T12.15701	8.46
90	2	"Fish Town and Too Many Thank You's"	James Widdoes	Story by : Eddie Gorodetsky & Susan McMartin; Teleplay by : Alissa Neubauer & Sheldon Bull & Britté Anchor	November 9, 2017	T12.15702	8.69
91	3	"A Seafaring Ancestor and a Bloomin' Onion"	James Widdoes	Story by : Susan McMartin & Anne Flett-Giordano; Teleplay by : Nick Bakay & Sheldon Bull & Britté Anchor	November 16, 2017	T12.15703	8.39
92	4	"Fancy Crackers and Giant Women"	James Widdoes	Story by : Warren Bell & Marco Pennette; Teleplay by : Chuck Lorre & Eddie Gorodetsky & Gemma Baker	November 23, 2017	T12.15704	7.89
93	5	"Poodle Fuzz and a Twinge of Jealousy"	James Widdoes	Story by : Marco Pennette & Anne Flett-Giordano; Teleplay by : Alissa Neubauer & Adam Chase	November 30, 2017	T12.15705	8.59
94	6	"Smooth Jazz and a Weird Floaty Eye"	James Widdoes	Story by : Eddie Gorodetsky & Susan McMartin; Teleplay by : Nick Bakay & Sheldon Bull & Britté Anchor	December 7, 2017	T12.15706	8.78
95	7	"Too Many Hippies and Huevos Rancheros"	James Widdoes	Story by : Nick Bakay & Susan McMartin; Teleplay by : Eddie Gorodetsky & Gemma Baker & Warren Bell	December 14, 2017	T12.15707	8.65
96	8	"An Epi-Pen and a Security Cat"	James Widdoes	Story by : Warren Bell & Adam Chase & Alissa Neubauer; Teleplay by : Nick Bakay & Marco Pennette & Anne Flett-Giordano	December 21, 2017	T12.15708	8.85
97	9	"Teenage Vampires and a White Russian"	James Widdoes	Story by : Nick Bakay & Alissa Neubauer; Teleplay by : Sheldon Bull & Anne Flett-Giordano & Michael Shipley	January 4, 2018	T12.15709	9.88
98	10	"A Bear and a Bladder Infection"	James Widdoes	Story by : Eddie Gorodetsky & Marco Pennette & Britté Anchor; Teleplay by : Gemma Baker & Adam Chase & Susan McMartin	January 11, 2018	T12.15710	9.54
99	11	"Bert and Ernie and a Blessing of the People"	James Widdoes	Story by : Marco Pennette & Michael Shipley & Britté Anchor; Teleplay by : Adam Chase & Alissa Neubauer & Susan McMartin	January 18, 2018	T12.15711	9.26
100	12	"Push-Down Coffee and a Working Turn Signal"	James Widdoes	Story by : Chuck Lorre & Nick Bakay; Teleplay by : Eddie Gorodetsky & Gemma Baker	February 1, 2018	T12.15712	9.11
101	13	"Pudding and a Screen Door"	James Widdoes	Story by : Eddie Gorodetsky & Adam Chase & Susan McMartin; Teleplay by : Nick Bakay & Gemma Baker & Britté Anchor	March 1, 2018	T12.15713	9.01
102	14	"Charlotte Brontë and a Backhoe"	James Widdoes	Story by : Marco Pennette & Adam Chase & Susan McMartin; Teleplay by : Nick Bakay & Warren Bell & Britté Anchor	March 8, 2018	T12.15714	9.06
103	15	"Esta Loca and a Little Klingon"	Lea Thompson	Story by : Sheldon Bull & Susan McMartin; Teleplay by : Alissa Neubauer & Anne Flett-Giordano & Michael Shipley	March 29, 2018	T12.15715	8.56
104	16	"Eight Cats and the Hat Show"	James Widdoes	Story by : Nick Bakay & Alissa Neubauer & Adam Chase; Teleplay by : Eddie Gorodetsky & Gemma Baker & Warren Bell	April 5, 2018	T12.15716	8.34
105	17	"Crazy Snakes and a Clog to the Head"	James Widdoes	Story by : Susan McMartin & Anne Flett-Giordano; Teleplay by : Nick Bakay & Sheldon Bull & Michael Shipley	April 12, 2018	T12.15717	8.94
106	18	"Spaghetti Sauce and a Dumpster Fire"	James Widdoes	Story by : Gemma Baker & Susan McMartin; Teleplay by : Anne Flett-Giordano & Michael Shipley	April 19, 2018	T12.15718	8.82
107	19	"A Taco Bowl and a Tubby Seamstress"	James Widdoes	Story by : Nick Bakay & Marco Pennette & Warren Bell; Teleplay by : Eddie Gorodetsky & Adam Chase & Alissa Neubauer	April 26, 2018	T12.15719	8.31
108	20	"Ocular Fluid and Fighting Robots"	James Widdoes	Story by : Gemma Baker & Adam Chase & Anne Flett-Giordano; Teleplay by : Sheldon Bull & Michael Shipley & Britté Anchor	May 3, 2018	T12.15721	8.63
109	21	"Phone Confetti and a Wee Dingle"	James Widdoes	Story by : Warren Bell & Marco Pennette & Susan McMartin; Teleplay by : Eddie Gorodetsky & Nick Bakay & Alissa Neubauer	May 10, 2018	T12.15720	9.08
110	22	"Diamond Earrings and a Pumpkin Head"	James Widdoes	Story by : Eddie Gorodetsky & Sheldon Bull & Susan McMartin; Teleplay by : Warren Bell & Marco Pennette & Alissa Neubauer	May 10, 2018	T12.15722	7.97

=== Season 6 (2018–19) ===
No. overall	No. in season	Title	Directed by	Written by	Original release date	Prod. code	U.S. viewers (millions)
111	1	"Pre-Washed Lettuce and a Mime"	James Widdoes	Story by : Nick Bakay & Gemma Baker & Alissa Neubauer; Teleplay by : Warren Bell & Marco Pennette & Adam Chase	September 27, 2018	T12.16101	7.94
112	2	"Go-Go Boots and a Butt Cushion"	James Widdoes	Story by : Warren Bell & Britté Anchor; Teleplay by : Gemma Baker & Alissa Neubauer & Sheldon Bull	October 4, 2018	T12.16102	7.83
113	3	"Ambulance Chasers and a Babbling Brook"	James Widdoes	Story by : Gemma Baker & Alissa Neubauer; Teleplay by : Warren Bell & Sheldon Bull & Britté Anchor	October 11, 2018	T12.16103	8.21
114	4	"Big Sauce and Coconut Water"	James Widdoes	Story by : Nick Bakay & Sheldon Bull & Susan McMartin; Teleplay by : Anne Flett-Giordano & Michael Shipley & Britté Anchor	October 18, 2018	T12.16104	8.12
115	5	"Flying Monkeys and a Tank of Nitrous"	James Widdoes	Story by : Marco Pennette & Anne Flett-Giordano & Michael Shipley; Teleplay by : Nick Bakay & Adam Chase & Susan McMartin	October 25, 2018	T12.16105	7.98
116	6	"Cottage Cheese and a Weird Buzz"	James Widdoes	Story by : Nick Bakay & Adam Chase & Susan McMartin; Teleplay by : Marco Pennette & Anne Flett-Giordano & Michael Shipley	November 1, 2018	T12.16106	7.90
117	7	"Puzzle Club and a Closet Party"	James Widdoes	Story by : Sheldon Bull & Britté Anchor; Teleplay by : Gemma Baker & Warren Bell & Alissa Neubauer	November 8, 2018	T12.16107	8.09
118	8	"Jell-O Shots and the Truth about Santa"	James Widdoes	Story by : Susan McMartin & Anne Flett-Giordano; Teleplay by : Gemma Baker & Adam Chase & Sheldon Bull	November 15, 2018	T12.16108	7.93
119	9	"Pork Loin and a Beat Up Monte Carlo"	James Widdoes	Story by : Warren Bell & Alissa Neubauer; Teleplay by : Nick Bakay & Marco Pennette & Britté Anchor	November 29, 2018	T12.16109	7.47
120	10	"Flamingos and a Dance-Based Exercise Class"	James Widdoes	Story by : Gemma Baker & Adam Chase & Susan McMartin; Teleplay by : Sheldon Bull & Anne Flett-Giordano & Michael Shipley	December 6, 2018	T12.16111	7.92
121	11	"Foot Powder and the Barrelworks Pirates"	James Widdoes	Story by : Marco Pennette & Alissa Neubauer & Britté Anchor; Teleplay by : Nick Bakay & Warren Bell & Susan McMartin	December 13, 2018	T12.16110	7.72
122	12	"Hacky Sack and a Beautiful Experience"	James Widdoes	Story by : Sheldon Bull & Anne Flett-Giordano; Teleplay by : Gemma Baker & Adam Chase & Michael Shipley	January 10, 2019	T12.16112	9.35
123	13	"Big Floor Pillows and a Ball of Fire"	James Widdoes	Story by : Warren Bell & Adam Chase & Michael Shipley; Teleplay by : Nick Bakay & Susan McMartin & Anne Flett-Giordano	January 17, 2019	T12.16114	8.45
124	14	"Kalamazoo and a Bad Wedge of Brie"	James Widdoes	Story by : Nick Bakay & Warren Bell & Susan McMartin; Teleplay by : Marco Pennette & Alissa Neubauer & Britté Anchor	January 31, 2019	T12.16113	8.55
125	15	"Sparkling Banter and a Failing Steel Town"	James Widdoes	Story by : Alissa Neubauer & Britté Anchor; Teleplay by : Gemma Baker & Marco Pennette & Adam Chase	February 14, 2019	T12.16115	7.64
126	16	"Skippy and the Knowledge Hole"	James Widdoes	Story by : Gemma Baker & Marco Pennette; Teleplay by : Alissa Neubauer & Sheldon Bull & Britté Anchor	February 21, 2019	T12.16116	8.41
127	17	"A Dark Closet and Therapy with Horses"	James Widdoes	Story by : Sheldon Bull & Anne Flett-Giordano & Michael Shipley; Teleplay by : Nick Bakay & Warren Bell & Susan McMartin	March 7, 2019	T12.16117	8.30
128	18	"Soup Town and a Little Blonde Mongoose"	Rebecca Ancheta Blum	Story by : Gemma Baker & Adam Chase & Sheldon Bull; Teleplay by : Anne Flett-Giordano & Michael Shipley & Britté Anchor	April 4, 2019	T12.16118	7.61
129	19	"Lumbar Support and Old Pork"	James Widdoes	Story by : Nick Bakay & Warren Bell & Maria Espada Pearce; Teleplay by : Marco Pennette & Alissa Neubauer & Susan McMartin	April 18, 2019	T12.16119	6.62
130	20	"Triple Dip and an Overhand Grip"	James Widdoes	Story by : Marco Pennette & Alissa Neubauer & Michael Shipley; Teleplay by : Nick Bakay & Sheldon Bull & Susan McMartin	April 25, 2019	T12.16121	7.91
131	21	"Finger Guns and a Beef Bourguignon"	James Widdoes	Story by : Gemma Baker & Britté Anchor & Chelsea Myers; Teleplay by : Warren Bell & Anne Flett-Giordano & Adam Chase	May 2, 2019	T12.16120	7.89
132	22	"Crazy Hair and a Teeny Tiny Part of Canada"	James Widdoes	Story by : Warren Bell & Michael Shipley & Britté Anchor; Teleplay by : Gemma Baker & Adam Chase & Anne Flett-Giordano	May 9, 2019	T12.16122	8.08

=== Season 7 (2019–20) ===
No. overall	No. in season	Title	Directed by	Written by	Original release date	Prod. code	U.S. viewers (millions)
133	1	"Audrey Hepburn and a Jalapeño Pepper"	James Widdoes	Story by : Gemma Baker & Britté Anchor & Robyn Morrison; Teleplay by : Warren Bell & Alissa Neubauer & Adam Chase	September 26, 2019	T12.16401	6.25
134	2	"Pop Pop and a Puma"	James Widdoes	Story by : Marco Pennette & Sheldon Bull & Susan McMartin; Teleplay by : Nick Bakay & Ilana Wernick & Anne Flett-Giordano	October 3, 2019	T12.16404	6.28
135	3	"Goat Yogurt and Ample Parking"	James Widdoes	Story by : Warren Bell & Alissa Neubauer; Teleplay by : Gemma Baker & Adam Chase & Britté Anchor	October 10, 2019	T12.16402	5.78
136	4	"Twirly Flippy Men and a Dirty Bird"	James Widdoes	Story by : Marco Pennette & Ilana Wernick & Anne Flett-Giordano; Teleplay by : Sheldon Bull & Susan McMartin & Chelsea Myers	October 17, 2019	T12.16403	5.81
137	5	"Fake Bacon and a Plan to Kill All of Us"	James Widdoes	Story by : Gemma Baker & Adam Chase; Teleplay by : Warren Bell & Alissa Neubauer & Britté Anchor	October 24, 2019	T12.16406	6.34
138	6	"Wile E. Coyote and a Possessed Doll"	Rebecca Ancheta Blum	Story by : Marco Pennette & Susan McMartin & Anne Flett-Giordano; Teleplay by : Nick Bakay & Sheldon Bull & Ilana Wernick	November 7, 2019	T12.16408	6.20
139	7	"Pork Butt and a Mall Walker"	James Widdoes	Story by : Nick Bakay & Sheldon Bull & Ilana Wernick; Teleplay by : Marco Pennette & Susan McMartin & Anne Flett-Giordano	November 14, 2019	T12.16405	6.28
140	8	"Hot Butter and Toxic Narcissism"	James Widdoes	Story by : Alissa Neubauer & Adam Chase; Teleplay by : Gemma Baker & Warren Bell & Britté Anchor	November 21, 2019	T12.16407	6.06
141	9	"Tuna Florentine and a Clean Handoff"	James Widdoes	Story by : Warren Bell & Ilana Wernick & Anne Flett-Giordano; Teleplay by : Nick Bakay & Susan McMartin & Britté Anchor	December 5, 2019	T12.16409	6.07
142	10	"Higgledy-Piggledy and a Cat Show"	James Widdoes	Story by : Warren Bell & Britté Anchor; Teleplay by : Gemma Baker & Alissa Neubauer & Adam Chase	December 12, 2019	T12.16410	6.25
143	11	"One Tiny Incision and a Coffin Dress"	James Widdoes	Story by : Sheldon Bull & Ilana Wernick & Susan McMartin; Teleplay by : Nick Bakay & Marco Pennette & Anne Flett Giordano	January 9, 2020	T12.16411	5.99
144	12	"Silly Frills and a Depressed Garden Gnome"	James Widdoes	Story by : Gemma Baker & Marco Pennette; Teleplay by : Alissa Neubauer & Adam Chase & Sheldon Bull	January 16, 2020	T12.16412	6.30
145	13	"Dammit Sandra and Viking Ancestors"	James Widdoes	Story by : Nick Bakay & Susan McMartin & Britté Anchor; Teleplay by : Warren Bell & Ilana Wernick & Anne Flett-Giordano	January 30, 2020	T12.16413	6.08
146	14	"Cheddar Cheese and a Squirrel Circus"	James Widdoes	Story by : Alissa Neubauer & Sheldon Bull; Teleplay by : Gemma Baker & Marco Pennette & Adam Chase	February 6, 2020	T12.16415	6.34
147	15	"Somebody's Grandmother and the A-List"	James Widdoes	Story by : Gemma Baker & Adam Chase; Teleplay by : Marco Pennette & Alissa Neubauer & Sheldon Bull	February 13, 2020	T12.16414	6.27
148	16	"Judy Garland and a Sexy Troll Doll"	Betsy Thomas	Story by : Alissa Neubauer & Adam Chase; Teleplay by : Gemma Baker & Marco Pennette & Sheldon Bull	February 20, 2020	T12.16416	6.28
149	17	"Beef Baloney Dan and a Sarcastic No"	James Widdoes	Story by : Warren Bell & Anne Flett-Giordano & Britté Anchor; Teleplay by : Nick Bakay & Ilana Wernick & Susan McMartin	March 5, 2020	T12.16417	5.82
150	18	"A Judgy Face and Your Grandma's Drawers"	James Widdoes	Story by : Gemma Baker & Marco Pennette; Teleplay by : Alissa Neubauer & Adam Chase & Sheldon Bull	March 12, 2020	T12.16419	6.35
151	19	"Texas Pete and a Parking Lot Carnival"	James Widdoes	Story by : Nick Bakay & Warren Bell & Susan McMartin; Teleplay by : Anne Flett-Giordano & Britté Anchor & Robyn Morrison	April 2, 2020	T12.16418	7.62
152	20	"Big Sad Eyes and an Antique Hot Dog"	James Widdoes	Story by : Adam Chase & Sheldon Bull & Anne Flett-Giordano; Teleplay by : Nick Bakay & Susan McMartin & Britté Anchor	April 16, 2020	T12.16420	7.14

=== Season 8 (2020–21) ===
No. overall	No. in season	Title	Directed by	Written by	Original release date	Prod. code	U.S. viewers (millions)
153	1	"Sex Bucket and the Grammar Police"	James Widdoes	Teleplay by : Alissa Neubauer & Adam Chase & Ilana Wernick; Story by : Gemma Baker & Anne Flett-Giordano & Chelsea Myers	November 5, 2020	T12.16601	4.82
154	2	"Smitten Kitten and a Tiny Boo-Boo Error"	James Widdoes	Teleplay by : Gemma Baker & Ilana Wernick & Anne Flett-Giordano; Story by : Alissa Neubauer & Adam Chase & Chelsea Myers	November 12, 2020	T12.16602	5.21
155	3	"Tang and a Safe Space for Everybody"	James Widdoes	Story by : Nick Bakay & Sheldon Bull & Chandra Thomas; Teleplay by : Warren Bell & Susan McMartin & Britté Anchor	November 19, 2020	T12.16603	5.07
156	4	"Astronauts and Fat Trimmings"	James Widdoes	Story by : Susan McMartin & Britté Anchor & Chandra Thomas; Teleplay by : Nick Bakay & Warren Bell & Sheldon Bull	December 3, 2020	T12.16604	5.32
157	5	"Sober Wizard and a Woodshop Workshop"	James Widdoes	Story by : Warren Bell & Ilana Wernick & Anne Flett-Giordano; Teleplay by : Gemma Baker & Alissa Neubauer & Adam Chase	December 17, 2020	T12.16605	4.59
158	6	"Woo-Woo Lights and an Onside Kick"	James Widdoes	Story by : Warren Bell & Sheldon Bull & Nadiya Chettiar; Teleplay by : Nick Bakay & Susan McMartin & Britté Anchor	January 21, 2021	T12.16606	5.02
159	7	"S'Mores and a Sadness Cocoon"	James Widdoes	Story by : Gemma Baker & Ilana Wernick & Chandra Thomas; Teleplay by : Warren Bell & Alissa Neubauer & Adam Chase	February 11, 2021	T12.16607	5.45
160	8	"Bloody Stumps and a Chemical Smell"	James Widdoes	Story by : Nick Bakay & Susan McMartin & Britté Anchor; Teleplay by : Sheldon Bull & Anne Flett-Giordano & Nadiya Chettiar	February 18, 2021	T12.16608	5.34
161	9	"Whip-Its and Emotionally Attuned Babies"	James Widdoes	Story by : Warren Bell & Adam Chase & Chelsea Myers; Teleplay by : Gemma Baker & Alissa Neubauer & Ilana Wernick	February 25, 2021	T12.16609	5.18
162	10	"Illegal Eels and the Cantaloupe Man"	James Widdoes	Story by : Susan McMartin & Ilana Wernick & Britté Anchor; Teleplay by : Alissa Neubauer & Adam Chase & Sheldon Bull	March 4, 2021	T12.16610	5.28
163	11	"Strutting Peacock and Father O'Leary"	Rebecca Ancheta Blum	Story by : Sheldon Bull & Susan McMartin & Britté Anchor; Teleplay by : Nick Bakay & Anne Flett-Giordano & Nadiya Chettiar	March 11, 2021	T12.16611	4.67
164	12	"Tiny Dancer and an Impromptu Picnic"	Nick Bakay	Story by : Nick Bakay & Sheldon Bull & Chelsea Myers; Teleplay by : Susan McMartin & Britté Anchor & Nadiya Chettiar	April 1, 2021	T12.16612	5.00
165	13	"Klondike-Five and a Secret Family"	James Widdoes	Story by : Adam Chase & Susan McMartin & Anne Flett-Giordano; Teleplay by : Nick Bakay & Warren Bell & Robyn Morrison	April 8, 2021	T12.16613	4.93
166	14	"Endorphins and a Toasty Tushy"	James Widdoes	Story by : Alissa Neubauer & Sheldon Bull & Britté Anchor; Teleplay by : Gemma Baker & Ilana Wernick & Nadiya Chettiar & Matthew McGeehan	April 15, 2021	T12.16614	5.35
167	15	"Vinyl Flooring and a Cartoon Bear"	James Widdoes	Story by : Gemma Baker & Alissa Neubauer & Sheldon Bull; Teleplay by : Ilana Wernick & Britté Anchor & Nadiya Chettiar & Alexandra Melnick	April 22, 2021	T12.16615	5.04
168	16	"Scooby-Doo Checks and Salisbury Steak"	James Widdoes	Story by : Nick Bakay & Warren Bell & Susan McMartin & Chandra Thomas; Teleplay by : Adam Chase & Anne Flett-Giordano & Emlyn Crenshaw	April 29, 2021	T12.16616	5.30
169	17	"A Community Hero and a Wide Turn"	James Widdoes	Story by : Gemma Baker & Alissa Neubauer & Ilana Wernick & Anne Flett-Giordano; Teleplay by : Sheldon Bull & Britté Anchor & Nadiya Chettiar	May 6, 2021	T12.16617	5.29
170	18	"My Kinda People and the Big To-Do"	James Widdoes	Chuck Lorre & Nick Bakay & Gemma Baker & Warren Bell	May 13, 2021	T12.16618	6.17
