= Mom (TV series) =

American sitcom (2013–2021)

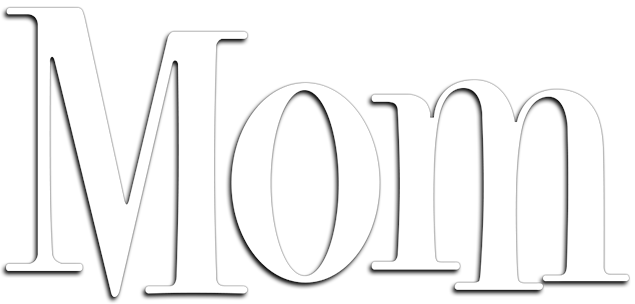
- Genre: Sitcom; Comedy drama
- Created by: Chuck Lorre; Eddie Gorodetsky; Gemma Baker
- Showrunners: Chuck Lorre; Gemma Baker
- Starring: Anna Faris; Allison Janney; Sadie Calvano; Nate Corddry; Matt Jones; French Stewart; Spencer Daniels; Blake Garrett Rosenthal; Mimi Kennedy; Jaime Pressly; Beth Hall; William Fichtner; Kristen Johnston
- Music by: Jenny Leite
- Opening theme: "Overture" from Ruslan and Lyudmila by Mikhail Glinka
- Country of origin: United States
- Original language: English
- No. of seasons: 8
- No. of episodes: 170 (list of episodes)

Production
- Executive producers: Chuck Lorre; Eddie Gorodetsky; Nick Bakay; Gemma Baker; Warren Bell
- Producers: Michael Collier; Kelly-Anne Lee
- Cinematography: Steven V. Silver
- Editors: Peter Chakos (pilot); Pat Barnett; Skip Collector; Joe Bella
- Camera setup: Multi-camera
- Running time: 18–21 minutes
- Production companies: Chuck Lorre Productions; Warner Bros. Television

Original release
- Network: CBS
- Release: September 23, 2013 – May 13, 2021

Mom is an American television sitcom created by Chuck Lorre, Eddie Gorodetsky, and Gemma Baker that aired for eight seasons on CBS from September 23, 2013, to May 13, 2021. Set in Napa, California, it follows dysfunctional mother/daughter duo Bonnie and Christy Plunkett, who, after having been estranged for years while both struggled with addiction, attempt to pull their lives together by trying to stay sober. It stars Anna Faris and Allison Janney, with Mimi Kennedy, Jaime Pressly, Beth Hall, William Fichtner, Sadie Calvano, Blake Garrett Rosenthal, Matt Jones, French Stewart and Kristen Johnston in supporting roles.

Unlike most multi-camera sitcoms on CBS, Mom utilized serialized storytelling that had overarching storylines that continued over multiple episodes and across multiple seasons, and past events would often be referenced later in the series. The characters often experienced events that contained dramatic emotional weight and experienced character development consequential to the series' plot, making the series more in line with a comedy-drama rather than a traditional sitcom. The series was filmed in front of a live audience and produced by Chuck Lorre Productions and Warner Bros. Television.

Mom received acclaim from critics and audiences for the writing and performances (particularly Janney's), as well as for addressing real-life issues such as: alcoholism, drug addiction, teen pregnancy, addictive gambling, homelessness, relapse, cancer, death, erectile dysfunction, domestic violence, overdose, palsy, rape, obesity, stroke, ADHD and miscarriage; and for maintaining a deft balance between the humorous and darker aspects of these issues. The show has ranked among the top five comedies with adults aged 25–54 and adults aged 18–49. It received various accolades, with Janney winning two straight Primetime Emmy Awards for Outstanding Supporting Actress in a Comedy Series in 2014 and 2015, and being nominated in 2016; and for Outstanding Lead Actress in a Comedy Series in 2017, 2018, and 2021. It also garnered multiple nominations at the Critics' Choice Television Awards and the People's Choice Awards. On September 4, 2020, Faris announced she would exit from the series and shortly thereafter CBS announced that it would end after its eighth season. The series finale aired on May 13, 2021.

== Synopsis ==
Title card used for seasons 1–4

Mom follows Christy Plunkett (Anna Faris), a single mother who, after battling drug abuse including alcoholism, decides to restart her life in Napa, California, working as a waitress and attending Alcoholics Anonymous meetings. Her mother, Bonnie Plunkett, (Allison Janney) is also a recovering addict.

Christy has two children. Her daughter, Violet (Sadie Calvano) was born when Christy was 17. Violet also becomes pregnant as a teenager, the father of the child is her boyfriend Luke (Spencer Daniels). Christy’s young son, Roscoe (Blake Garrett Rosenthal), is a product of her marriage to Baxter, a deadbeat but likable pothead.

Christy eventually returns to school and pursues her dream of becoming a lawyer, while Bonnie meets and marries a retired stuntman named Adam Janikowski (William Fichtner). Through it all, Christy and Bonnie rely on their support system from AA, including the wise Marjorie (Mimi Kennedy), wealthy and materialistic Jill (Jaime Pressly), submissive and sometimes overly-emotional Wendy (Beth Hall), and loudmouthed but sweet Tammy (Kristen Johnston). Collectively, they help each other stay sober in the face of the conflicts they face.

Following the departure of Christy, who moves to Washington, D.C., the show delves more into the personal lives of her friends she left behind.

Several of the characters' last names (Plunkett, Stabler, Janikowski, Biletnikoff, Madden, Hubbard, Casper, Wells, Banaszak) were named after former players and coaches of the Oakland Raiders.

== Episodes ==
Season	Episodes	Originally released		Rank	Viewers (in millions)
Season	Episodes	First released	Last released	Rank	Viewers (in millions)
1	22	September 23, 2013	April 14, 2014	42	8.34
2	22	October 30, 2014	April 30, 2015	26	11.79
3	22	November 5, 2015	May 19, 2016	40	9.64
4	22	October 27, 2016	May 11, 2017	29	9.43
5	22	November 2, 2017	May 10, 2018	19	10.96
6	22	September 27, 2018	May 9, 2019	23	10.22
7	20	September 26, 2019	April 16, 2020	29	8.52
8	18	November 5, 2020	May 13, 2021	32	7.05

== Cast and characters ==
Actor	Character	Seasons							
Actor	Character	1	2	3	4	5	6	7	8
Anna Faris	Christy Plunkett	Main	Main	Main	Main	Main	Main	Main	
Allison Janney	Bonnie Plunkett	Main	Main	Main	Main	Main	Main	Main	Main
Matt Jones	Baxter	Main	Main	Main	Recurring	Guest	Guest		
Sadie Calvano	Violet Plunkett	Main	Main	Main	Recurring		Guest		
Blake Garrett Rosenthal	Roscoe Plunkett	Main	Main	Main	Recurring				
French Stewart	Rudy	Main	Main	Guest		Guest	Recurring	Recurring	Guest
Nate Corddry	Gabriel	Main	Main						
Spencer Daniels	Luke	Main	Recurring		Guest				
Mimi Kennedy	Marjorie Armstrong	Recurring	Main	Main	Main	Main	Main	Main	Main
Jaime Pressly	Jill Kendall		Recurring	Main	Main	Main	Main	Main	Main
Beth Hall	Wendy Harris		Recurring	Main	Main	Main	Main	Main	Main
William Fichtner	Adam Janikowski			Recurring	Main	Main	Main	Main	Main
Kristen Johnston	Tammy Diffendorf					Guest	Recurring	Main	Main

=== Main characters ===
- Anna Faris as Christy Jolene Plunkett (seasons 1–7): Christy is a sensitive mother struggling to recover from her addictions to alcohol and gambling. At the beginning of the series, she has been sober for 118 days. She is working hard to be a good example for her son, Roscoe, and to regain the trust of her daughter, Violet, who reveals in the pilot that she is pregnant. Christy is also trying to reconcile with her mother, Bonnie, with whom she has a tumultuous history and long estrangement. As the story unfolds, Christy discovers that her biological father, Alvin, abandoned Bonnie after she was discharged from the hospital on Christmas Eve. She eventually locates Alvin, learns that he is now married with two sons and runs an auto repair shop. Christy develops a bond with him and introduces him to her family, coming to view him as the father she needs in her life. Similar to her mother, Christy was a teenage mother, giving birth to Violet at 17. Violet's father, Butch, was abusive toward Christy, who attempted to leave him several times but struggled with fear. Ultimately, Christy found the courage to leave Butch to protect Violet. A former stripper, Christy primarily works as a waitress. Although she briefly receives a promotion to manager after Claudia divorces Gabriel, she eventually returns to waitressing, a job at which she doesn’t excel but can bring home a lot of food for Bonnie and herself. In mid-season 2, Christy decides to return to school to become a lawyer and takes a second job as Steve Casper's assistant. She works hard, eventually earning her bachelor’s degree and being accepted into law school. As season 6 comes to a close, Christy begins an internship with a law firm while still juggling her waitress job. In season 7, she faces challenges at work, struggles academically in law school (being rejected for a mock trial team and encountering a professor who assumes she is a poor student because she is a single mother), and lives a social life that leaves much to be desired. Feeling desperate, she kisses another woman in the season finale. In the season 8 premiere, it is revealed that Christy has left Napa to attend Georgetown Law School on a full scholarship. Despite being mentioned throughout the final season, Christy never returns for a guest appearance and does not participate in the series finale.
- Allison Janney as Bonnie Plunkett: Bonnie is Christy's mother and Baxter's former mother-in-law. She is a cynical recovering addict who believes she is always right, but learns humility over time. Bonnie is determined to regain the love and trust of her daughter, whom she was unable to nurture properly as a child. Bonnie was given up for adoption at age four and spent time in the foster care system, moving from house to house. At age 15, she ran away with Alvin, which led to an unplanned pregnancy. She gave birth to Christy at 17 after Alvin abandoned them at the hospital on Christmas Eve. Initially, Bonnie considered aborting the pregnancy and even planned to put Christy up for adoption. A pleasant Jewish couple was prepared to adopt Christy, but Bonnie ultimately couldn't follow through. From then on, she tried her best to raise her daughter, but Christy ended up raising herself, as Bonnie often prioritized parties and drinking over being a present mother. Over time and with considerable therapy, Bonnie found more balance in her life. She opened up to Christy about her past, including details about her birth father and her former life as a drug dealer. However, Bonnie suffered a relapse in Season 1 after losing her job and apartment, and had to move in with Christy, Violet, and Roscoe. As Christy reconnected with Alvin, Bonnie realized she still had feelings for him, leading to a romantic relationship at the beginning of Season 2. Sadly, this relationship was cut short when Alvin suffered a heart attack and died, leaving the family in shock. Later, Bonnie struggled with a back injury and became dependent on pain medication, resulting in another relapse. In Season 3, she met her biological mother, and in Season 4, she met her half-brother, Ray, after their mother passed away. Bonnie managed the apartment building where she and Christy lived, and in Season 6, she was diagnosed with ADHD and began seeing a therapist to address it. Toward the end of Season 8, she partnered with her former foster sister, Tammy Diffendorf, to establish a construction firm that would promote Tammy's skills in repair and home construction.
- Sadie Calvano as Violet Plunkett (main, season 1-3; recurring, season 4; guest, season 6): Violet is Christy’s daughter and Roscoe's older maternal half-sister. At the beginning of the series, she is a hardworking, intelligent, and confident senior in high school. However, shes' upset with her mother, Christy, who has often neglected her children. After becoming a mother herself by having her boyfriend Luke's baby, Violet decides to place her child for adoption. She believes this choice is the best way to break her family's cycle of poor life decisions and give her baby a better chance than she, her mother, or her grandmother ever had. Violet’s father was physically abusive toward Christy, and Christy has lied to Violet about his whereabouts, even taking her to a random man's grave and telling her that her father is dead. In Season 2, Violet goes through a downward spiral and cheats on Luke, leading to their breakup. She later becomes engaged to Gregory Munchnik, a much older psychology professor at her university, but he breaks off the engagement after Violet starts partying too hard. This behavior leaves Christy and Bonnie questioning whether she is simply experiencing youth or developing a serious problem. After the breakup, Violet moves back in with Christy and Bonnie. When her mother and grandmother insist that she find a job, Violet relocates to Lake Tahoe to work as a blackjack dealer at Harrah's. However, she ultimately returns home after struggling to manage her life there. She reconciles with Luke, who has made improvements in his own life. In her last appearance, Violet returns in Season 6 as the host of a successful podcast called "The Mother of All Problems" where she discusses Christy's troubling past in detail. It is revealed that Violet and Christy have not communicated in over a year, although Violet still keeps in touch with Bonnie. While Violet acknowledges that Christy has turned her life around, she expresses that the past can't be changed and believes it is healthier for her not to pursue a relationship with Christy moving forward. In Season 7, Christy informs Bonnie’s new sponsee that she still does not have a relationship with Violet.
- Nate Corddry as Gabriel (main, seasons 1–2): Gabriel is the boss and manager of the restaurant where Christy works. He is married to a domineering woman who somewhat intimidates him. Gabriel and Christy are involved in an affair, which Christy eventually decides to end. However, Gabriel often tries desperately to revive their relationship. They briefly resume their affair in season 2 when Christy is promoted to be his replacement. Although Gabriel is a hardworking and competent manager, he is frequently put in his place by his subordinates, especially Chef Rudy.
- Matt Jones as Baxter (main, season 1-3; recurring, season 4; guest, season 5-6): Christy's ex-husband and the father of Roscoe. Sweet, but very unstable, he is unable to maintain a serious relationship or steady work for much longer than a month. Loves an easy life and frequently gets into fraudulent deals to make money. Despite his flaws, he is a loving father who usually comes through for his son. During season 2, under the influence of his wealthy new girlfriend Candace, Baxter mostly gives up his slacker ways and becomes a car salesman at a dealership owned by Candace's father. Despite admitting to Christy that he needs to smoke pot to act happy, Baxter seems mostly content to be an ersatz "trophy husband". In season 5, Baxter pays for Christy's new car when she's dealing with money issues as a way of making amends to her.
- French Stewart as Chef Rudy (main, seasons 1–2; recurring, seasons 3, 5–8): the head chef for the Rustic Fig restaurant, where Christy works as a waitress. A dominant and difficult self-made man, Rudy acts superior in his relationships with others. He sells drugs out of the freezer and is boastful and arrogant, often yelling at his subordinates without mincing words, and will not hesitate to humiliate anyone who opposes him. He is secretive about his past and distant from people but briefly dates Bonnie and is revealed to be a bisexual fetishist with expensive tastes and hobbies who steals food from the restaurant (which has resulted in him being fired as of season 8, leaving him to run his own food truck). Tammy becomes his love interest late in the series. Still, they are no longer involved by the time the series ends.
- Spencer Daniels as Luke: a young student who loves to enjoy life and adventure. He had been dating Violet for a little over a year and got her pregnant. Luke is considerably airheaded, smoking marijuana often, but always tries to prove to Christy that he is not as crazy as he appears: he seems to genuinely love Violet, staying beside her and supporting her throughout her pregnancy, and he is often more sensitive towards Christy than her own children are, perhaps because his parents are religious fundamentalists with whom he does not connect. In season 2, Violet, during her downward spiral, cheated on Luke, and he broke up with Violet. By season 4, Luke has apparently cleaned himself up and got a high-paying job as a playtester with a video game company, driving Violet to get back together with him. Violet reveals in season 6 that she and Luke have ended their relationship.
- Blake Garrett Rosenthal as Roscoe Plunkett: Christy's son from Baxter and younger maternal half-brother of Violet. He experimented with marijuana at age twelve. He has not appeared since season 4, and it is stated he went to live with Baxter, and his new wife Christy confirms in season 7. However, in "Beef Baloney Dan and a Sarcastic No", it is heavily implied that Christy still has an ongoing relationship with her son, as it is revealed that he still texts her.
- Mimi Kennedy as Marjorie Armstrong-Perugian (recurring, season 1; main, seasons 2–8): Christy's and Bonnie's AA sponsor who is something of a cat lady. She had problems with alcohol and drugs in the past, was a groupie (it is insinuated in one episode and attested by herself in others that she slept with Jimi Hendrix), was briefly involved with the Black Panther Party, spent some time in prison for bank robbery, was homeless for a period of time, and is a mother to a son whom she had no relationship or contact with for years, until Christy convinced him to reconnect with Marjorie following her cancer diagnosis. She was diagnosed with breast cancer in season 1, and after extensive treatment finally beats it at the end of season 2. Through Christy, she meets Victor Perugian, Christy's former landlord, whom she eventually weds and then cares for after he suffers a stroke. When Victor dies, her vulnerable side is revealed, and the women do their best to help Marjorie cope with being widowed for the second time (her first husband having died before the start of the show, after three decades of marriage). Marjorie has dealt with financial and health issues in Seasons 7 and 8, including her having to take a food delivery job to earn money and having to have a stent put into her heart to prevent its failure.
- Jaime Pressly as Jill Kendall (recurring, season 2; main, seasons 3–8): A wealthy, divorced socialite and alcoholic. Christy first met her at an AA meeting and, at Marjorie's urging, offered to sponsor her. Jill suffered several relapses before becoming sober. Her mother had struggled with depression and alcoholism before dying by suicide when Jill was a teenager. Jill carried this pain with her throughout her life, culminating in season 4, when she was overcome with grief on the anniversary of her mother's death. Jill is from North Carolina and worked hard to lose the thickness of her Southern accent when she moved to California to be with her then-husband, James. After trying to become pregnant and miscarrying, Jill decides to adopt a foster child. She is eventually given a teenage girl named Emily, but Christy helps Emily's mother become sober at the start of season 5, leading to Emily leaving Jill. This caused Jill to overeat and gain weight (scripted to cover up Pressly's real-life pregnancy during season 5). After an extended stay at a health spa, she returns in the latter half of season 5 and suffers another relapse. Despite being vain and obsessed with how her peers view her, she is shown to genuinely care about her friends and use her experiences to help them with their own problems. In season 6, she began a relationship with Andy, a police officer and former Marine who provided private home security services at Jill's home after it was broken into. At the end of season 7, Jill consults a fertility doctor to freeze her eggs. Still, she gets a call from the doctor saying that she has no viable eggs, leaving her extremely devastated by that news: she becomes clingy and paranoid, eventually causing Andy to break up with her in season 8, although they get back together after being caught in a bank robbery. In the final episodes of the series, Jill becomes pregnant again and marries Andy.
- Beth Hall as Wendy Harris (recurring, season 2; main, seasons 3–8): A member of the AA group, often subdued and prone to constant crying. She is a member of Mensa, works as a registered nurse (displaying a hidden sadistic streak when in uniform), was raised by a lesbian couple in Florida, is implied to be in witness protection or otherwise connected to a mob family, and is the subject of a recurring joke in the series where no one, including her friends, listens much to her or wants her around more than minimally possible. In "A Pirate, Three Frogs, and a Prince", Wendy was revealed to be both bisexual/pansexual/bicurious and possibly attracted to Bonnie. Wendy frequently moderates the group's AA meetings; she delivers the final line of the series, standing at the meeting podium and asking, "Who else wants to share?"
- William Fichtner as Adam Janikowski, Bonnie's later love interest and eventual husband, an ex-stuntman who now uses a wheelchair. He and Bonnie met over the phone after Adam called her several times, though hers was a wrong number given to him by a woman he'd met in a bar. Adam reveals in his first date with Bonnie that his spinal injury did not occur in the line of work but was the result of sliding off a cliff while snowboarding. He is supportive of Bonnie's recovery, though does not always fully understand it, prompting him to join Al-Anon eventually. In season 6, he uses his life savings to open a bar called AJ's Barrelworks, and he and Bonnie get married in that season's finale. In the series finale, it is revealed that Adam has lung cancer, although it has been caught early and is therefore treatable.
- Kristen Johnston as Tammy Diffendorf (guest, season 5; recurring, season 6; main, seasons 7–8): an ex-con who was Bonnie's foster sister for a short time in their teens. They reconnect after Bonnie comes across Tammy while visiting a women's prison, where Tammy says she was tried and convicted of robbing a steakhouse on "Cops Eat Free Night", and Tammy joins the group's AA meetings upon being released from prison in season 6. After temporarily living in Bonnie and Christy's apartment, she moves in with Marjorie. When she returns to her old foster home where she lived with Bonnie, it is revealed that her father killed her mother, and she went into the foster care system after that. In the Season 8 premiere, Tammy talks briefly on the phone to her father when he calls from prison to wish her a happy birthday. Tammy is extremely handy at home improvements and similar light construction work and has helped Bonnie with her apartment manager work while also doing remodeling at Adam's bar and the restaurant where Christy worked. By the end of season 7, she is working toward being a full-fledged contractor and is no longer on parole after making excellent progress readjusting to society post-prison. At the end of season 8, she and Bonnie have set up a construction firm of their own.

=== Recurring characters ===
- Reggie de Leon as Paul (seasons 1–3, 5–8): Chef Rudy's silent and often submissive sous-chef, who was fired alongside him. They now run the food truck together.
- Kevin Pollak as Alvin Lester Biletnikoff (seasons 1–2, 8): Christy's father and Bonnie's ex-boyfriend who abandoned them when Christy was born. When Christy finds Alvin, he is running his own auto body shop and states he has a wife and two sons who know nothing of her existence. Despite that, he comes to love Christy and does what he can to be in her life and help out, including fixing up a used car to give her and attempting to reach out to her children as a grandfather. He and Bonnie initially treated each other with contempt and hatred over the various mistakes each of them has made in their past, but they rekindled their relationship after his wife left him and he survived a heart attack. In season 2, Alvin suffers a second, fatal heart attack while in bed with Bonnie.
- Octavia Spencer as Regina Tompkins (seasons 1–3): A fellow AA member and money manager who embezzled from her clients and faces a long prison sentence. While a close if questionable friend to Christy, Regina and Bonnie typically hold each other in contempt, but beneath the surface, they bear some affection for each other. In the middle of season 2, she is given early parole and becomes a born-again Christian, eventually moving in with Jill. Regina drifts apart from her friends after she decides she is no longer an alcoholic, essentially choosing wine over her friends, and struggles alone with the dissonance after moving into her own apartment and out of Jill's mansion.
- Courtney Henggeler as Claudia (seasons 1–3): Gabriel's wealthy and snobbish (later ex-) wife, who takes over the restaurant from him and briefly appoints Christy as manager.
- Mary Pat Gleason as Mary (seasons 1–5, 7): A fellow AA member who is frequently interrupted by Bonnie when she shares her problems with the group, as her anecdotes tend to be bizarre and creepy even by the standards of addicts. Mary dies in season 7 at the AA meeting from an aneurysm (incidentally only a few months before Gleason's own death) and the main characters put together an elaborate reception to say goodbye to her.
- Don McManus as Steve Casper (seasons 1–4): A fellow AA member, Steve is a competent but creepy lawyer and occasionally aids Christy, who becomes his intern and trainee in season 2. He has a casual sex relationship with Bonnie in season 3. His final appearance was in the Season 4 finale, where he is stuck in Mexico because he stupidly fled there to avoid reprisals after losing a case involving a drug lord's son (stupidly since the drug lord is based in...Mexico).
- Ryan Cartwright and Melissa Tang as Jeff and Suzanne Taylor (seasons 1–2): the couple that adopts Violet's daughter.
- Sara Rue as Candace Hayes (seasons 2–4): Baxter's wealthy new wife, who reforms him. She delivers many subtle jabs at Christy's poverty in the form of backhanded compliments and seems to be trying to force Christy aside to replace her as Roscoe's mother. The hostility becomes much more obvious in season 3, when Candace's wealthy father, Fred (Harry Hamlin), briefly dates Christy and Candace accuses Christy of only being with him for his money. Christy breaks up with Fred because he openly insults and mocks Candace for doing nothing but living off his wealth. When Candace (wrongly and smugly) smirks that Fred dumped her, Christy gives Candace a hug and shuts her up by saying "I know why you're a bitch."
- Jonny Coyne as Victor Perugian (seasons 2–4): Christy's Armenian former landlord who becomes attracted to Marjorie, marrying her in season 3. Victor later suffers two strokes (both offscreen). The first in Season 5 leaves him largely incapacitated, and the second in Season 6 is fatal.
- Amy Hill as Beverly Tarantino (seasons 2–5): A tenant in the apartment complex where Christy and Bonnie live (the complex itself was never given a name on the show). She dislikes Bonnie and is always trying to get her fired from the building manager position. However, she has been less harsh since she admitted to Bonnie that her own father was a hopeless alcoholic, and that she has projected some of her anger at him onto Bonnie due to her AA ties.
- Charlie Robinson as Mr. Munson (seasons 2–7): A blind tenant in the apartment complex where Christy and Bonnie live. He is a Vietnam war veteran who is battling prostate cancer. He and Bonnie develop a friendship; Bonnie reads to him, helps him with his medications and offers rides to chemotherapy. When the new building owner tells Bonnie to evict any tenant who is significantly behind in rent (including Munson, who is behind after paying out of pocket for cancer medications not covered by the V.A.) Bonnie revolts, telling the owner she'll quit if the owner doesn't back down. Her stand saves Munson's apartment and helps to cement their friendship.
- David Krumholtz as Gregory Munchnik (seasons 2–3): Violet's older Jewish fiancé/ex-fiancé, a psychology professor at the college she attends.
- Emily Osment as Jodi Hubbard (season 3): A young drug addict whom Christy and Bonnie try to help get sober. She later dies from a drug overdose.
- Lauri Johnson as Beatrice (seasons 3–8): A waitress at the Burgundy Bistro that serves as a recurring location for the cast.
- Julia Lester as Emily (seasons 4–5): Jill's teenage foster daughter and Natasha's biological daughter.
- Missi Pyle as Natasha (seasons 4–5): Emily's biological mother, an alcoholic whom Christy knows from her stripping days. Christy helps Natasha get sober and regain custody of her daughter.
- Leonard Roberts as Ray Stabler (seasons 4–5): Bonnie's gay half-brother who was a successful lawyer and who developed a cocaine habit.
- Steven Weber as Patrick Janikowski (season 5), Adam's younger brother and Christy's short-term love interest. They break up after Christy turns down his proposal for her to move to Santa Cruz and live with him, and he marries another woman soon after.
- Yvette Nicole Brown as Nora Rogers (seasons 5–6): Christy's no-nonsense sponsor who works as a TV weather anchor and finds herself violating her established rules about not interacting with sponsees outside of AA with Christy. In the Season 6 finale, she tells a devastated Christy she is leaving California to take a job at a TV station in Minneapolis.
- Sam McMurray as Ned (season 6), one of the Gamblers Anonymous members where Christy attends meetings; he becomes her de facto sponsor.
- Susan Ruttan as Lucy (season 6), one of the Gamblers Anonymous members in Christy's group; she is good-hearted but constantly relapses and loses huge amounts of money.
- Will Sasso as Andy Pepper (seasons 6–8), Jill's on-and-off love interest and eventual husband, a police officer and former Marine. His last name wasn't given until the series finale and came as a source of amusement because he is a Sergeant with the PD (making him Sgt. Pepper) and he has a brother who is a physician (which makes the brother Dr. Pepper).
- Rainn Wilson as Trevor Wells (seasons 6–8): Bonnie's therapist who helps her with her ADHD and has a completely awful personal life, due to a divorce and financial setbacks. Bonnie ends up becoming friends with him and in his last appearance on the show she helps Trevor avoid a reunion with his terrible ex-wife and start a relationship with a woman he had a crush on in high school.
- Chiquita Fuller as Taylor (seasons 6–8): another waitress at the Burgundy Bistro.

=== Notable guests ===
- Jon Cryer as Alan Harper and Lisa Joyner as his date (S01E01): customers at the Rustic Fig
- Justin Long as Adam Henchy (S01E03, S01E06, and S01E08): Christy's first love interest of the series
- Nick Zano as David (S01E016 and S01E17): Christy's love interest, a handsome but hard-partying firefighter. While he and Christy are compatible sexually, he wants her to focus all attention on him, and she ultimately breaks up with him because she's neglecting her sobriety and friends & family.
- Ed Asner as Jack Bumgartner (S02E05): a tenant in the apartment building where Bonnie and Christy reside.
- Beverly D'Angelo as Lorraine Biletnikoff (S02E09, S02E11 and S02E12): Alvin's ex-wife, who hates Bonnie (and indirectly, Christy, as Bonnie's daughter). She refuses to help the Plunketts after Alvin dies without signing his updated will, but her sons end up defying her to give Christy and Bonnie a lot of money because "it was what Dad wanted."
- Colin Hanks as Andy Dreeson (S02E09): Christy's neighbor whose idea of a fun night is not exactly what she expected
- Toby Huss as Bill (S02E13): Bonnie's love interest after the death of Alvin. She tries too hard to make him into Alvin 2.0, but her changes end up enabling Bill to win over a pretty waitress (played by April Bowlby) at a Hooters-type restaurant.
- Ellen Burstyn as Shirley Stabler (S03E01): Bonnie's biological mother who put her in foster care when she was very young and later decided not to regain custody because she was dating a man who did not want any kids in his house. She's left weeping when Bonnie says that she both forgives her and will not have a relationship in the future. The character died in Season 4 after suffering from heart disease.
- June Squibb as Dottie (S03E01): a woman who Christy initially mistakes for Shirley, and later bonds with the Plunketts as a sort of modern family grandmother figure.
- Judy Greer as Michelle (S03E03): a woman who is drunk at a bar when Christy and Bonnie meet in a bar and wrongly think she's a person with alcoholism they can help. In reality, she got drunk over a lost promotion and an affair, and the intervention leads her to get a restraining order against both Plunketts.
- Linda Lavin as Phyllis Munchnik (S03E07 and S03E21): Gregory's mother and Violet's would-be Jewish mother-in-law, whom Christy ends up becoming friends with.
- Harry Hamlin as Fred Hayes (S03E08 and S03E09): Candace's wealthy father and Christy's brief love interest.
- Rosie O'Donnell as Jeanine (S03E10 and S04E02): an ex-girlfriend of Bonnie, with whom she and Christy lived. She and Christy maintain an aunt-niece relationship.
- Joe Manganiello as Julian (S03E11): a handsome but very sad newcomer to Alcoholics Anonymous whom Christy takes under her wing and (narrowly) avoids sleeping with.
- Rhea Perlman as Anya Perugian (S03E12): Marjorie's Armenian sister-in-law and Victor's sister, who is a bitter, unlikable woman who nearly derails Victor and Marjorie's wedding plans.
- Richard Schiff as Robert (S03E20): Bonnie's Communications Director in a White House dream that she had
- Bradley Whitford as Mitch (S04E09 and S06E13): Adam's friendtrying to seduce Bonnie in ways that often get him punched or otherwise injured.
- Nicole Sullivan as Leanne (S04E09 and S06E13): Mitch's hard-drinking wife who was once involved with Adam.
- Chris Pratt as Nick Banaszak (S04E11): Marjorie's nephew, a charming horse-riding instructor whom Christy hooks up with, despite Marjorie declaring him off-limits. He turns out to be goofy, and Marjorie reveals, to Christy's horror, that he has mental problems and mostly lives in an institution.
- Wendie Malick as Danielle Janikowski (S04E15 and S04E16): Adam's ex-wife whose friendly relationship with him confounds Bonnie.
- Michael Angarano as Cooper (S05E03 and S05E10): Christy's younger classmate at college and romantic interest
- Kristin Chenoweth as Miranda (S05E14): Jill's inner strength advisor who met her at the latter's weight loss retreat
- Patti LuPone as Rita Gennaro (S05E19): the demanding owner of the building that is managed by Bonnie. She's initially curt and makes harsh demands of Bonnie but becomes nicer when Bonnie stands up to her and reveals her own sad story.
- Constance Zimmer as Natalie Stevens (S06E03): Christy's rigid professor at the law school who also has alcoholism.
- Lois Smith as Claire Dickinson (S06E20): Bonnie and Tammy's former caretaker at the old foster home
- Kate Micucci as Patty (S07E01 and S07E10): A single mother who is a member of the AA meeting Bonnie attends while on her honeymoon with Adam. Bonnie agrees to become Patty's sponsor.
- Reginald Veljohnson as Jim (S07E01): A member of the AA meeting Bonnie attends while on her honeymoon with Adam
- John Ratzenberger as Stan (S07E01): A member of the AA meeting Bonnie attends while on her honeymoon with Adam. He tends to ramble.
- Paget Brewster as Veronica Stone (S07E03, S07E05 and S07E06): Christy's demanding and not-that-stable new boss at a law firm. She yells at Christy a lot and makes ridiculous demands but also serves as an oddly effective and intelligent mentor to her.
- Kathleen Turner as Cookie (S07E11 and S07E14): Tammy's long-lost aunt who comes back into her life; it's revealed that not only did Cookie lie about not knowing Tammy existed and let Tammy go into the foster system rather than take her in as a child, but also that the only reason she sought out Tammy now is to get her to agree to a life-saving kidney transplant.
- Peter Onorati as Wayne (S07E15): Marjorie's first post-widowing love interest from Canada.
- Courtney Thorne-Smith as Sam (S07E17): Adam's Al-Anon sponsor. Bonnie correctly suspects that she is attracted to Adam.
- Kevin Dunn as Gary (S08E02): Marjorie's annoying newer love interest from Chicago.
- Steve Valentine as Rod Knaughton (S08E03, S08E11 and S08E12): An almost-famous rocker, now a recovering addict, whom Bonnie spent a few nights with in the 1980s.
- Tyne Daly as Barbara (S08E09): Trevor's therapist. She bluntly tells him he cannot date Jill, and he reluctantly agrees.
- Bob Odenkirk as Hank (S08E12): A strip club owner who put up a huge billboard of Christy that the women end up painting over on their own.
- Dan Bucatinsky as Arthur (S08E15): Bonnie and Tammy's first client for their PlunkenDorf Construction business.
- Melanie Lynskey as Shannon (S08E18): A new and reluctant member of Bonnie's AA group.
- Rondi Reed as Jolene (S08E18): Shannon's mother, a severe and abusive addict.

== Production ==
=== Development ===
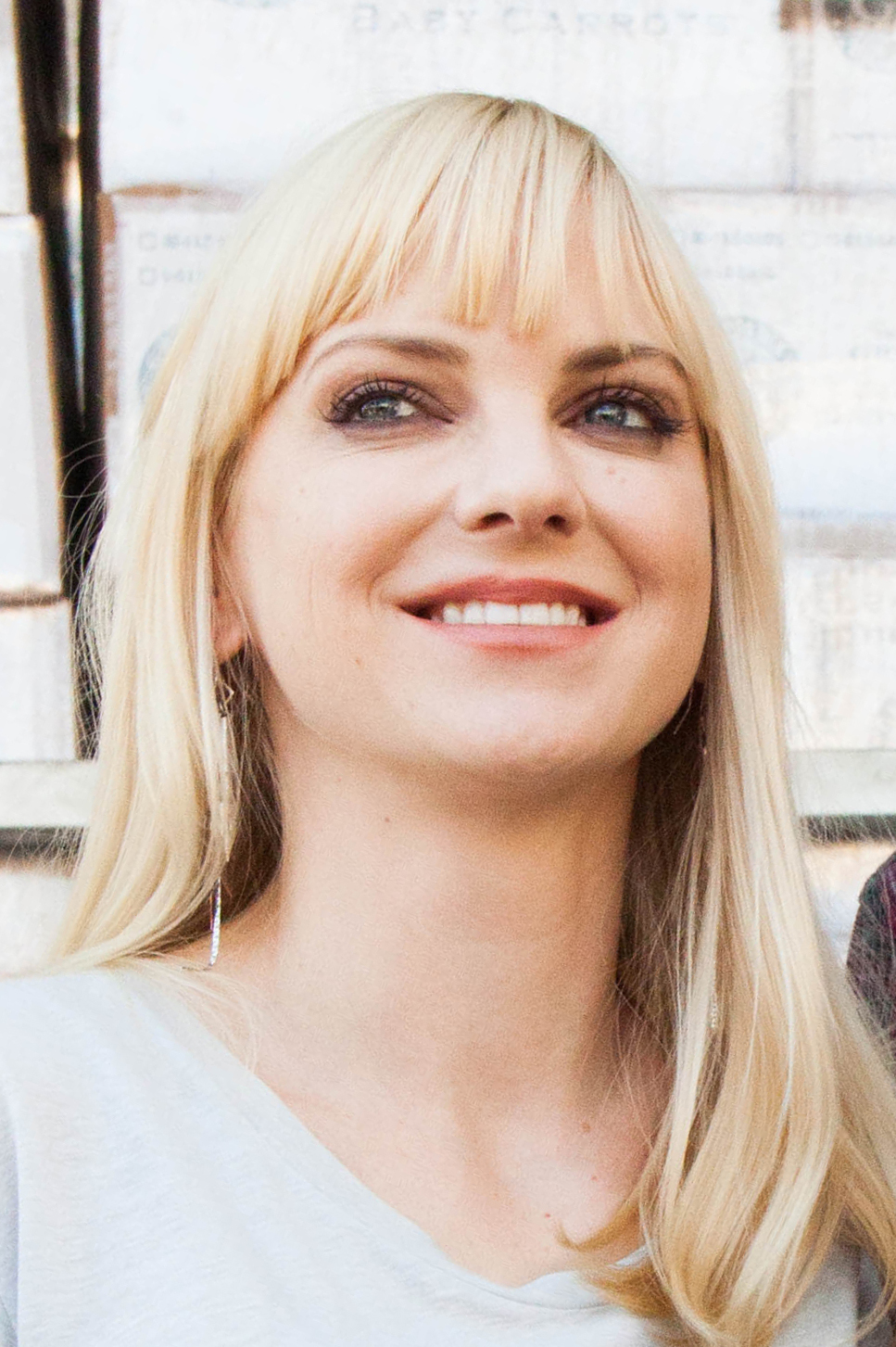
Anna Faris was cast in January 2013.

Mom was one of the many projects that became a priority for CBS and Warner Bros when it was pitched in December 2012, in part due to Lorre's new four-year deal with Warner the previous September. It was green-lit by CBS for a series order pickup on May 9, 2013. It gave Lorre the distinction of having four sitcoms on one network starting in the 2013–14 season. The following week, the network announced it would place the show in the Monday night 9:30 pm (ET/PT) time slot following 2 Broke Girls. However, after the cancellation of We Are Men, 2 Broke Girls was moved into the show's 8:30 pm slot, with repeats of The Big Bang Theory occupying the 9 pm lead-in time slot to Mom until the season debut of Mike & Molly on November 4, 2013. Mom received a full first season order for 22 episodes on October 18, 2013.

On March 13, 2014, CBS announced the second season renewal of Mom. It moved from Mondays at 9:30 PM to Thursdays at 8:30 PM for the first 14 episodes, until it moved to Thursdays at 9:30 PM following The Odd Couple series premiere and the series finale of Two and a Half Men.

By season three, the focus became more about Christy and Bonnie and their group from AA, while the restaurant set, the kids, and Baxter's roles were reduced significantly.

In February 2021, CBS announced the series would end with the final episode of the eighth season, airing on May 13, 2021.

=== Casting ===
The series gave Faris, who had guest-starred in various television programs between her film projects and been sought for other television projects (including an unused pilot, Blue Skies, produced for NBC), her first full-time television role as the lead character, Christy, in January 2013. On January 28, 2013, Janney was next to come aboard as Christy's mother. Matt Jones and Spencer Daniels joined the cast in February 2013, with Jones as Christy's ex-husband Baxter, and Daniels as Luke, the boyfriend of Christy's daughter, Violet.

== Broadcast ==
In Australia, Mom debuted on Nine Network on April 9, 2014. In Canada, Citytv aired it simultaneously. In Greece, Star Channel debuted it on October 25, 2014. In India, Comedy Central (India) broadcast the series through 2015. In Israel, it is broadcast on HOT Comedy Central. In the United Kingdom, ITV2 debuted the show on January 20, 2014; they have since dropped it, and it had not been available to UK viewers since the end of Season 4. From October 2022, all 8 seasons were made available to UK viewers for the first time on Amazon Prime Video.

=== Syndication ===
Mom went into syndication in late 2017. It airs on local affiliates, as well as on FXX (2017–2021), FX (2021–2023), TV Land (2017–2018, 2022–2025), Paramount Network (2018–2022), Nick at Nite (2018–2024), and CMT (2017, 2019–2025).

== Reception ==
=== Ratings ===
Viewership and ratings per season of Mom
Season	Timeslot (ET)	Episodes	First aired		Last aired		TV season	Viewership rank	Avg. viewers (millions)
Season	Timeslot (ET)	Episodes	Date	Viewers (millions)	Date	Viewers (millions)	TV season	Viewership rank	Avg. viewers (millions)
1	Monday 9:30 pm	22	September 23, 2013	7.99	April 14, 2014	6.86	2013–14	42	8.34
2	Thursday 8:30 pm (1–14); Thursday 9:30 pm (15–18); Thursday 9:00 pm (19–22)	22	October 30, 2014	11.13	April 30, 2015	8.78	2014–15	26	11.79
3	Thursday 9:00 pm (Note: The eleventh episode of the eighth and final season aired at 9:30 p.m. due to President Biden's address on the one-year anniversary of the COVID-19 lockdowns which aired on 8:00 p.m. on March 11, 2021.)	22	November 5, 2015	7.28	May 19, 2016	8.14	2015–16	40	9.64
4	Thursday 9:00 pm	22	October 27, 2016	7.02	May 11, 2017	8.12	2016–17	29	9.43
5	Thursday 9:00 pm	22	November 2, 2017	8.46	May 10, 2018	7.97	2017–18	19	10.96
6	Thursday 9:00 pm	22	September 27, 2018	7.94	May 9, 2019	8.08	2018–19	23	10.22
7	Thursday 9:00 pm	20	September 26, 2019	6.25	April 16, 2020	7.14	2019–20	29	8.52
8	Thursday 9:00 pm	18	November 5, 2020	4.82	May 13, 2021	6.17	2020–21	32	7.05

=== Critical response ===
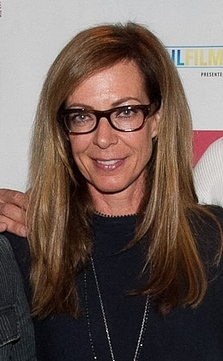
Allison Janney received acclaim for her performance as Bonnie Plunkett throughout the show's run and received Primetime Emmy Award nominations for seasons 1–5 and 8, winning for season 1 and season 2.

Critical response of Mom
Season	Rotten Tomatoes	Metacritic
1	70% (40 reviews)	65 (25 reviews)
2	88% (8 reviews)	81 (4 reviews)
3	100% (11 reviews)	82 (4 reviews)

Mom has been met with favorable reviews, with praise for its writing and performances, especially by Allison Janney and Anna Faris. It received a Metacritic score of 65 out of 100 for its first season, based on 25 reviews. On Rotten Tomatoes, the first season has an approval rating of 70%, based on 40 reviews, and an average rating of 5.71/10. The site's critical consensus reads: "Anna Faris and Allison Janney share an undeniable comedic chemistry, and if the jokes are sometimes too crass, Mom represents a sincere (and often witty) attempt to address addiction issues." Boston Herald critic Mark A. Perigard gave a positive review, writing: "This is dark material, yet Faris balances it with a genuine winsomeness, able to wring laughs out of the most innocuous lines." New York Magazine critic Matt Zoller Seitz praised the cast and called it "just about perfect".

The second season received even more critical acclaim, with a Metacritic score of 81 out of 100. On Rotten Tomatoes, it holds an approval rating of 88%, based on 8 reviews, and an average rating of 8.5/10.

The third season was also met with critical acclaim, with a Metacritic score of 82 out of 100. On Rotten Tomatoes, it holds an approval rating of 100%, based on 11 reviews, and an average rating of 8.33/11. The site's critical consensus reads: "Mom continues to nurture the multi-cam sitcom genre with mature storytelling and wonderful performances by Anna Faris and Allison Janney, who both handle reflective drama with the same deft touch as they do comedic timing".

=== Accolades ===
Accolades
Year	Award	Category	Recipients and nominees	Result
2014	People's Choice Award	Favorite New TV Comedy		Nominated
2014	People's Choice Award	Favorite Actress in a New TV Series	Anna Faris	Nominated
2014	People's Choice Award	Favorite Actress in a New TV Series	Allison Janney	Nominated
2014	Critics' Choice Television Award	Best Supporting Actress in a Comedy Series	Allison Janney	Won
2014	Critics' Choice Television Award	Best Guest Performer in a Comedy Series	Mimi Kennedy	Nominated
2014	Primetime Emmy Award	Outstanding Supporting Actress in a Comedy Series	Allison Janney	Won
2015	People's Choice Award	Favorite Network TV Comedy		Nominated
2015	72nd Golden Globe Awards	Best Supporting Actress – Series, Miniseries or Television Film	Allison Janney	Nominated
2015	Prism Awards	Performance in a Comedy Series	Anna Faris	Nominated
2015	Prism Awards	Performance in a Comedy Series	Allison Janney	Won
2015	Prism Awards	Comedy Series Episode or Multi-Episode Storyline		Nominated
2015	Critics' Choice Television Award	Best Comedy Series		Nominated
2015	Critics' Choice Television Award	Best Supporting Actress in a Comedy Series	Allison Janney	Won
2015	Primetime Emmy Awards	Outstanding Supporting Actress in a Comedy Series	Allison Janney	Won
2016	People's Choice Award	Favorite Network TV Comedy		Nominated
2016	People's Choice Award	Favorite Comedic TV Actress	Anna Faris	Nominated
2016	Critics' Choice Television Award	Best Supporting Actress in a Comedy Series	Allison Janney	Nominated
2016	Critics' Choice Television Award	Best Guest Performer in a Comedy Series	Ellen Burstyn	Nominated
2016	Art Directors Guild Awards	Excellence in Production Design in a Multi-Camera Series	John Shaffner	Nominated
2016	Primetime Emmy Awards	Outstanding Supporting Actress in a Comedy Series	Allison Janney	Nominated
2016	Primetime Emmy Awards	Outstanding Cinematography for a Multi-Camera Series	Steven V. Silver	Nominated
2016	Primetime Emmy Awards	Outstanding Multi-Camera Picture Editing for a Comedy Series	Ben Bosse and Joe Bella	Nominated
2016	Critics' Choice Television Award	Best Supporting Actress in a Comedy Series	Allison Janney	Nominated
2017	People's Choice Award	Favorite Comedic TV Actress	Anna Faris	Nominated
2017	Primetime Emmy Awards	Outstanding Lead Actress in a Comedy Series	Allison Janney	Nominated
2017	Primetime Emmy Awards	Outstanding Multi-Camera Picture Editing for a Comedy Series	Joe Bella	Nominated
2018	Primetime Emmy Awards	Outstanding Multi-Camera Picture Editing for a Comedy Series	Joe Bella	Nominated
2018	Primetime Emmy Awards	Outstanding Lead Actress in a Comedy Series	Allison Janney	Nominated
2018	Critics' Choice Television Award	Best Actress in a Comedy Series	Allison Janney	Nominated
2019	Primetime Emmy Awards	Outstanding Multi-Camera Picture Editing for a Comedy Series	Joe Bella	Nominated
2019	Critics' Choice Television Award	Best Comedy Series		Nominated
2020	Critics' Choice Television Award	Best Comedy Series		Nominated
2020	Critics' Choice Television Award	Best Supporting Actor in a Comedy Series	William Fichtner	Nominated
2020	Critics' Choice Television Award	Best Supporting Actress in a Comedy Series	Jaime Pressly	Nominated
2021	Primetime Emmy Awards	Outstanding Lead Actress in a Comedy Series	Allison Janney	Nominated
2021	Primetime Emmy Awards	Outstanding Directing for a Comedy Series	James Widdoes	Nominated
2021	Primetime Emmy Awards	Outstanding Multi-Camera Picture Editing for a Comedy Series	Joe Bella	Nominated
