= Adam Chase (writer) =

American producer and writer

Adam Chase is an American producer and writer. He is best known for his work on the TV series Friends, for which he was nominated for three Primetime Emmy Awards, two Golden Globe Awards, in addition to winning two People's Choice Awards. Chase began working on the show in the first season and left after the completion of season six (140 episodes). He has written and produced for all four major U.S. TV networks. Chase was a Co-Executive Producer on the television series Mom from Warner Bros. Television.
