= Lauri Johnson =

American actress (born 1949)

- Born: Laura Denise Smith; December 27, 1949 (age 75); Santa Monica, California, U.S.
- Children: 2
- Parents: Paul Smith (father); Annette Warren (mother)

Lauri Denise Johnson (née Smith; born December 27, 1949) is an American actress, who has played roles in films, television series, animated programs and video games.

== Early life ==
Johnson was born in Santa Monica, California, in 1949. She is the daughter of vocalist Annette Warren and jazz pianist Paul Smith.

== Career ==
Johnson's first prominent role was providing additional voices to the Hanna-Barbera series The Jetsons. She began landing small bit roles in the films City of Angels and The Negotiator and later appeared in episodes of several popular television shows.

== Filmography ==
=== Film ===
Year	Title	Role	Notes
1998	City of Angels	Woman in Car	
1998	The Negotiator	Chief's Wife	
2000	The Cell	Mrs. Hickson	
2002	Laurel Canyon	Landlord	
2003	Carolina	Susan the Waitress	
2005	War of the Worlds	Older Woman	
2006	For Your Consideration	Morley's Secretary	
2006	Love Made Easy	Gus's Mother	
2006	Domestic Import	Mama	
2007	Waitress	Nurse Norma	
2007	Finishing the Game	Housewife #3	
2008	Yonkers Joe	Hammer	
2009	Spread	Meter Maid, Doris	
2010	Quit	Bartender	
2016	Rules Don't Apply	Nurse	
2017	Inheritance	Morse Matriarch	
2021	The Starling	Helen	

=== Television ===
Year	Title	Role	Notes
1985	The Jetsons	Mrs. Meltdown (voice)	Episode: "Family Fallout"
1995	Batman: The Animated Series	Nurse (voice)	Episode: "The Terrible Trio"
1995	The Sylvester & Tweety Mysteries	Miss Marbles (voice)	Episode: "A Ticket to Crime"
1996	Party of Five	Wedding Organizer	Episode: "Spring Breaks"
1998	Cow and Chicken	Greta, Little Girl (voice)	Episode: "P.E."
1998	ER	Oncology Nurse	Episode: "Gut Reaction"
1998	The New Batman Adventures	Knife-Thrower's Wife (voice)	Episode: "Animal Act"
1999	Becker	Mrs. Becker	Episode: "Limits & Boundaries"
1999	Batman Beyond	Nurse (voice)	Episode: "Shriek"
1999	The Wild Thornberrys	Female Seal, Ostrich (voice)	2 episodes
1999	Angel	Aunt Martha	Episode: "The Bachelor Party"
2000	The Drew Carey Show	Gladys	Episode: "Be Drew to Your School"
2000	Rugrats	Lolana (voice)	3 episodes
2001	The Ellen Show	Box Office Alice	Episode: "The Move"
2001	Everybody Loves Raymond	Sister Ann	Episode: "Marie's Sculpture"
2002	Charmed	Secretary	Episode: "Saving Private Leo"
2002	JAG	Commander	Episode: "The Promised Land"
2003	American Dreams	Mrs. Wiczowski	Episode: "Secrets and Lies"
2003	Frasier	Mrs. Gablyczyck	Episode: "The Placeholder"
2003, 2005	One on One	Various roles	2 episodes
2004	The King of Queens	Nancy	Episode: "Dougie Houser"
2004	NYPD Blue	Lois Rubicoff	Episode: "Take My Wife, Please"
2004	Six Feet Under	Joan Morrison	Episode: "The Dare"
2005	That's So Raven	Madame Blecch	Episode: "Too Much Pressure"
2005	Cold Case	Nurse Olsen	Episode: "Committed"
2006	Ghost Whisperer	Brenda Reese	Episode: "Last Execution"
2006	My Name Is Earl	Captain Daniels	Episode: "Stole a Badge"
2007	Crossing Jordan	Saleswoman	Episode: "D.O.A."
2007	Boston Legal	Sister Catherine	2 episodes
2007	Without a Trace	Carolyn Nisbit	Episode: "One Wrong Move"
2008	Unhitched	Emma	Episode: "Mardi Gras Croc Attack"
2008	The Unit	Neighbor	Episode: "Sudden Flight"
2008	Raising the Bar	Shauna Nolan	Episode: "Out on the Roof"
2008	Grey's Anatomy	Ruth Begler	Episode: "Life During Wartime"
2008	Turbo Dates	Zelda	Episode: "Two-Fer"
2009	Nip/Tuck	Lila Rusovic	Episode: "Gene Shelly"
2009	Mad Men	Carrie	Episode: "Out of Town"
2009	The Forgotten	Delores	Episode: "Lucky John"
2010	The Big Bang Theory	Mrs. Gunderson	Episode: "The Lunar Excitation"
2010	Batman: The Brave and the Bold	Ma Murder (voice)	Episode: "Menace of the Madniks!"
2011	Days of Our Lives	Erin Hewitt	3 episodes
2011	General Hospital	Mrs. MacInery	7 episodes
2012	Childrens Hospital	Rosa	Episode: "Free Day"
2012	Nosferajew	Ginny	Episode: "Community Blech"
2013	Shameless	Make-A-Wish Administrator	Episode: "May I Trim Your Hedges?"
2013	The Secret Life of the American Teenager	Eva, George's mother	2 episodes
2014	New Girl	Stenographer	Episode: "Fired Up"
2015	Mike & Molly	Ann	Episode: "Mike Check"
2015	Nicky, Ricky, Dicky & Dawn	Tanya	Episode: "Quad-ventures in Babysitting"
2015–2021	Mom	Beatrice	16 episodes
2016	The Middle	Mrs. Hilsabeck	2 episodes
