= Beth Hall =

American actress

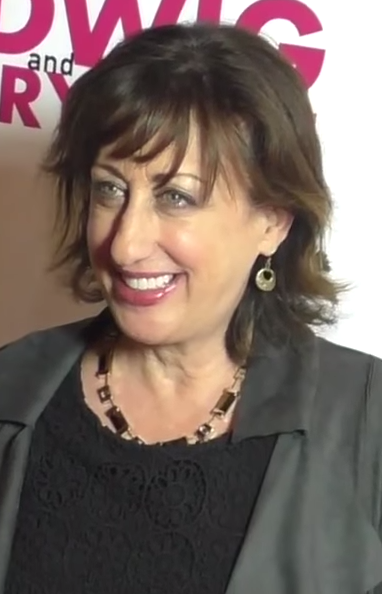
- Hall in 2016
- Education: Rutgers University
- Occupation: Actress
- Years active: 1997–present
- Notable work: Mom; Mad Men
- Spouse: Philip Mastopietro (m. 1997)
- Children: 1

Beth Hall is an American actress. She is best known for her portrayal of Wendy Harris on the CBS sitcom Mom (2015–2021). She also had a recurring role as Caroline on Mad Men (2010–2015). Hall's film credits include Wild (2014), Marvelous and the Black Hole (2021) and You Are So Not Invited to My Bat Mitzvah (2023).

== Early life ==
Hall's father was a stand-up comedian for a time and appeared on The Garry Moore Show. Her mother was an actress. She has two siblings. After graduation from Rutgers University, she moved to New York City to work on off-Broadway theatre. She subsequently moved to Los Angeles.

== Career ==
=== Film and television ===
Early in her career, she appeared in television commercials such as Wrigley and FedEx. Hall had guest roles in several television shows such as Murphy Brown (1997), It's Like, You Know... (1999), Frasier (2001), Family Affair (2003), Oliver Beene (2004) and House (2004). In 2010, she landed the recurring role of Caroline on AMC's period drama television series Mad Men, first appearing in Season 4's "Christmas Comes But Once a Year". Her character Caroline is a longtime secretary for Roger Sterling, played by John Slattery.

In 2014, she had a guest role as Janice on the second season of CBS' sitcom Mom. Her character Janice stood up in an Alcoholics Anonymous meeting to say her name and kept getting cut off. The scene was eventually cut, but the show's casting director told Hall that they would contact her later. She was then invited to read for the role of Wendy.

In 2015, she began portraying recovering alcoholic Wendy Harris on Mom. She had one of the main roles starting from the third season until the show's final and eighth season. The series followed a group of women dealing with alcohol addiction and recovery. Hall also appeared in films Wild (2014), Marvelous and the Black Hole (2021) and You Are So Not Invited to My Bat Mitzvah (2023).

=== Poker ===
Hall is an avid poker player and participates in poker tournaments in Los Angeles and Las Vegas. In 2016, she was the only woman entered in the Southern California Poker Championships that made it to the final day. Nearly 10,000 people entered and Hall finished in 14th place in the tournament. In March 2023, she won World Series of Poker Circuit at Parkwest Bicycle Casino.

== Personal life ==
Hall met her husband, Philip Mastopietro, at age 32, and they got married on April 5, 1997. The couple adopted a newborn daughter from the foster care system in Los Angeles.

== Filmography ==
Film and television
Year	Title	Role	Notes
1997	Murphy Brown	Pregnant Lady	Episode: "Operation: Murphy Brown"
1999	It's Like, You Know...	Mother	Episode: "The Apartment"
2001	Frasier	Babs	Episode: "Bully for Martin"
2002	Psychic Murders	Pepper Spray Psychic	Video
2003	Family Affair	Beth	Episode: "Miss Turnstiles"
2004	Oliver Beene	Skittish Female Tenant	Episode: "Kissing Babies"
2004	House	Shelly Lever	Episode: "Occam's Razor"
2008	Flea Market	Francine	Short film; Also as writer
2010–2015	Mad Men	Caroline	Recurring role; 20 episodes
2011	Curb Your Enthusiasm	Rabbi's Assistant	Episode: "Palestinian Chicken"
2013	Mistresses	Frustrating Customer	Episode: "A Kiss Is Just a Kiss?"
2014	Wild	Desk Clerk	Film
2014	Parks and Recreation	Darva Snerman	Episode: "New Beginnings"
2014	The Bridge	Perky Clerk	Episode: "Sorrowsworn"
2014	Jane the Virgin	Olivia	Episode: "Chapter Six"
2014	About a Boy	Maureen	Episode: "About a Prostitute"
2014	Mom	Janice	Episode: "Forged Resumes and the Recommended Dosage"; Deleted scene
2015–2021	Mom	Wendy Harris	Recurring role: Season 2 Main: Seasons 3–8; 127 episodes
2015	Gortimer Gibbon's Life on Normal Street	Mrs. Morgan	Episode: "Ranger and the Supercharged Championship"
2018–2020	25 Words or Less	Herself / Contestant	6 episodes
2021	Marvelous and the Black Hole	Bernice	Film
2022	Gaslit	Helen Thomas	Episode: "Honeymoon"
2023	You Are So Not Invited to My Bat Mitzvah	Julie	Film
