= Michael Shipley =

Michael Shipley may refer to:

- Mike Shipley (1956–2013), Australian mix engineer
- Michael Shipley (screenwriter), television writer and producer
