= Life on a Stick =

- Also known as: Related by Family
- Genre: Sitcom
- Created by: Victor Fresco
- Starring: Zachary Knighton; Charlie Finn; Rachelle Lefevre; Saige Thompson; Frankie Ryan Manriquez; Amy Yasbeck; Matthew Glave
- Theme music composer: Stuart Hart; Scott Lean; Steven M. Stern
- Composers: Greg Burns; Jeff Burns; Brian Kirk
- Country of origin: United States
- Original language: English
- No. of seasons: 1
- No. of episodes: 13 (8 unaired)

Production
- Executive producers: Victor Fresco; Maggie Bandur; Michael A. Ross; Mike Teverbaugh; Miriam Trogdon
- Camera setup: Multi-camera
- Running time: 30 minutes
- Production companies: Garfield Grove Productions; Paramount Television

Original release
- Network: Fox
- Release: March 24 – April 27, 2005

Life on a Stick (originally titled Related by Family) is an American sitcom that aired on Fox from March 24 to April 27, 2005. Thirteen episodes of the show were completed, but Fox only showed the first five before pulling the show due to poor ratings.

== Premise ==
The show centers on several teen characters who work and hang out at the mall food court. The main characters are Laz, his stepsister Molly, Laz's best friend Fred, and Laz's new girlfriend Lily. Laz's dad Rick and Molly's mom Michelle also play a large role in the show. They love all of their children, but their clear favorite is Gus (Frankie Ryan Manriquez).

Laz and Fred, both 18, have been friends forever. Just out of high school and unsure what they want to do with their lives, they take jobs at a mall food court, at "Yippiee Hot Dogs" run by Mr. Hut (Maz Jobrani). Laz meets Lily, the girl of his dreams there. Optimistic but not ambitious, Laz cuts a deal with his dad Rick and stepmom Michelle which allows Laz to continue living rent-free at home. All he must do is keep an eye on his stepsister, Molly. Michelle and Rick hope that Laz will help socialize Molly and get her on the right track with Jasper.

== Cast ==
- Zachary Knighton as Laz Lackerson
- Charlie Finn as Fred, Laz's best friend
- Rachelle Lefevre as Lily, Laz's girlfriend
- Saige Thompson as Molly Callahan, Laz's stepsister
- Frankie Ryan Manriquez as Gus Lackerson, Laz's half-brother
- Amy Yasbeck as Michelle Callahan, Laz's stepmother
- Matthew Glave as Rick Lackerson, Laz's father

== Episodes ==
An alternate version of the pilot exists, originally titled Related by Family, featuring a different actor, Kurt Doss, playing Gus Lackerson.

No.	Title	Directed by	Written by	Original release date	Prod. code
1	"Pilot"	Andy Ackerman	Victor Fresco	March 24, 2005	100
Laz is out of high school and his parents force him to get a job. Laz and his friend Fred get a job at Yippie Hot Dogs where they meet an attractive girl Lily and their evil boss Mr. Hut. Meanwhile Laz's angry stepsister Molly falls for a guy named Jasper. After getting fired Laz's parents make him spend time with Molly or they will kick him out. Laz tries to impress Lily by deep-frying everything in Mr. Hut's office with Lilly and Fred.
2	"Liking Things the Way They Aren't"	Andrew D. Weyman	Michael A. Ross	March 30, 2005	101
After working to pay for the objects deep fried in Mr. Hut's office, Laz gets Fred and Lily jobs at a pretzel place, but it's worse than Yippie Hot Dogs. Meanwhile Molly thinks she is going on a date with Jasper, but finds out differently when she meets his girlfriend.
3	"Fish Song"	Andrew D. Weyman	Miriam Trogdon	April 6, 2005	102
When Laz ignores Fred to spend more time with Lily, Fred starts to join the fish restaurant in singing. Meanwhile Laz gathers up a mob to take down the Fish place, because Mr. Hutt makes them sing to compete with the Fish place. Molly and Jasper almost kiss when they study together. Guest appearances by American Idol season 2 contestant Kimberly Caldwell and winner Ruben Studdard.
4	"The Defiant Ones"	Andrew D. Weyman	Adam Chase	April 20, 2005	105
Molly asks for Laz's help in defying a German teacher. When this works, Jasper kisses her and she's happy, but is in deep water with her teacher. Fred is forced to hang out with Mr. Hutt at the mall after he accidentally advises him to separate with his wife.
5	"Gangs of the Mall"	Andrew D. Weyman	Maggie Bandur	April 27, 2005	104
Fred gets into a fight with a Sport's City guy, when he starts to like his ex-girlfriend Alison. Meanwhile Molly accidentally says "I Love You" to Jasper.
6	"We'll Always Have Bowling"	Andy Ackerman	Mike Teverbaugh	Unaired	103
Lily is still not committing to Laz. Fred dates a friend of Laz's mom, Michelle. Fred also hooks Laz up with an older woman. Molly accidentally breaks something special of Rick's and bribes Gus with cappuccinos to take the fall.
7	"Breaking Away"	Andrew D. Weyman	Kat Likkel & John Hoberg	Unaired	106
Fred makes special breakaway clothing to make his life more convenient. Lily and Laz try to convince each other that they are over with one another by going out with different people. Laz goes out with a girl who has an extreme dislike for old people and Lily goes out with a guy who sings about everything. Rick and Michelle discover an old stuffed bear of Molly's that they took from her eight years ago and give Molly whatever she wants when she finds out.
8	"Things People Stand For"	Andrew D. Weyman	Jeff Westbrook	Unaired	107
Laz, Fred, Lily, and Mr. Hutt compete in a contest to win a car at the mall, by seeing who can hold on to it the longest. Laz meets a girl named Jenny when he and Lily get into a fight, but he learns a lot about Lily in the process.
9	"The Things We Do for Love"	Sheldon Epps	Michael A. Ross	Unaired	108
After Molly hits Laz with a car he wets himself this causes Molly and Lily to take pity on him. Feeling embarrassed Laz and Fred try to think of a way to forget about Laz wetting himself. Gus refuses to leave a suit of armor he wore for a school play.
10	"Some Drinkin' and Some Foolin' Around"	Lee Shallat Chemel	Mike Teverbaugh	Unaired	109
Fred discovers edible clothing and becomes obsessed with it. Rick and Michelle worry about Molly and drinking, but get drunk in the process allowing Molly to see who they truly are. Laz and Lily have sex in a wilderness store and finally start a relationship together, but Laz ruins it. Fred and Jasper hang out at the movies and eating the edible clothing since the movie is very overpriced.
11	"Soupless in Seattle"	Lee Shallat Chemel	Miriam Trogdon	Unaired	110
Now in a relationship, Lily keeps making soup for Laz. Laz gets freaked out that she keeps giving him the same soup and that she's too intense. They eventually find out that Laz hates the frequency of the soup and that Lily hates making it. They go so far into the lie that they eventually get engaged and a marriage license. Fred reveals to Molly that Jasper broke up with Susan, but she freaks out that she didn't tell her. Molly even goes as low as having Michelle dress her to impress Jasper, but it backfires when she thinks he has no interest.
12	"Wouldn't It Be Nice"	Lee Shallat Chemel	Maggie Bandur	Unaired	111
Now that they are in a relationship Jasper has Molly meet his parents and accidentally kills Jasper's grandmother. Laz, Lily, and Fred stay at a furniture store in the mall when they realize that their own place will be too expensive. Laz and Lily learn things they don't like about each other when they live together. Fred takes in a hurt bird.
13	"The Gods of TV"	Andy Ackerman	Adam Chase	Unaired	112
Fred wins front-row Beastie Boys tickets which is the same night as Lily and Molly's self-defense demonstration, which Jasper and Laz have to go to. They decide to not go, but Fred hangs on to the tickets. When Laz tells him to get rid of them, Fred lights them on fire and throws them out the window. They hit a motorcyclist who is the stage manager of the Beastie Boys and asks them to come with him to the concert and meet the Beastie Boys. Jasper keeps on thinking these as signs of fate, but Laz thinks of it as fate tempting them. When the manager hurts his foot, he asks the guys to carry him inside to the concert. They eventually cave and go to the concert. Meanwhile Lilly gets freaked out by an old memory of a guy in an animal costume. The guys lie and have to wreck Laz's car to prove to the girls they couldn't go to the demonstration because they hit a deer.

== Development and production ==
Originally called Related by Family, the show was created by Victor Fresco, who had also created the short-lived sitcom Andy Richter Controls the Universe. However, like Andy Richter Controls the Universe, poor ratings doomed Life on a Stick to quick cancellation. It only aired five low-rated episodes, although the premiere had American Idol for a lead-in. Thirteen episodes were produced.

Yasbeck took this role as part of the healing process following the death of her husband John Ritter. A role on Life on a Stick was offered to the then-unknown Charlie Day; he turned it down to continue working on the pilot for what would become It's Always Sunny in Philadelphia.
