= Mom season 6 =

Season of American television series

Mom
- Season 6
- Starring: Anna Faris; Allison Janney; Mimi Kennedy; Jaime Pressly; Beth Hall; William Fichtner
- No. of episodes: 22

Release
- Original network: CBS
- Original release: September 27, 2018 – May 9, 2019

Season chronology
- ← Previous; Season 5 Next → Season 7

The sixth season of the situational comedy drama Mom began on September 27, 2018, and concluded on May 9, 2019 on CBS in the United States. The season is produced by Chuck Lorre Productions and Warner Bros. Television, with series creators Chuck Lorre, Eddie Gorodetsky and Gemma Baker serving as executive producer.

Christy (Anna Faris) has gone back to school and is pursuing her dream of becoming a lawyer, while Bonnie (Allison Janney) attempts to have a healthy romantic relationship with her fiancé, Adam (William Fichtner). Through it all, Christy and Bonnie rely on their support system from AA, including the wise Marjorie (Mimi Kennedy), the wealthy and sometimes misguided Jill (Jaime Pressly), the overly emotional Wendy (Beth Hall), and the loudmouth but sweet Tammy (Kristen Johnston). Christy's daughter Violet made her final appearance on this show in the episode "Jell-O Shots and the Truth about Santa". Collectively, they help each other stay sober in the face of whatever life throws at them. The episodes are usually titled with two odd topics that are mentioned in that episode.

Season six of Mom aired Thursdays in the United States at 9:00 p.m. after Young Sheldon.

== Cast ==
=== Main ===
- Anna Faris as Christy Plunkett
- Allison Janney as Bonnie Plunkett
- Mimi Kennedy as Marjorie Armstrong-Perugian
- Jaime Pressly as Jill Kendall
- Beth Hall as Wendy Harris
- William Fichtner as Adam Janikowski

=== Recurring ===
- Kristen Johnston as Tammy Diffendorf
- Lauri Johnson as Beatrice
- Yvette Nicole Brown as Nora Rogers
- Will Sasso as Andy
- Sam McMurray as Ned
- Susan Ruttan as Lucy
- French Stewart as Chef Rudy
- Rainn Wilson as Trevor Wells
- Sadie Calvano as Violet Plunkett
- Matt L. Jones as Baxter
- Reggie de Leon as Paul
- Chiquita Fuller as Taylor
- Charlie Robinson as Mr. Munson

=== Special guest stars ===
- Constance Zimmer as Professor Natalie Stevens
- Bradley Whitford as Mitch
- Nicole Sullivan as Leanne
- Lois Smith as Claire Dickinson

=== Guest stars ===
- Matt Oberg as Geoffrey
- John Rubinstein as Professor Addison
- Maya Lynne Robinson as Amanda
- Stephanie Erb as Louise
- Miller Tai as Matt
- Dan Martin as Juan
- Michelle Arthur as Belinda
- Eric Allan Kramer as Earl
- Cleo King as Sandy
- Michelle Ortiz as Stacy
- Alimi Ballard as Professor Gannon
- Caleb Pierce as Glen
- Amanda Perez as Lisa
- David Meunier as Yuri
- Anna Maria Horsford as Eve Ferguson
- Shea Buckner as Daniel
- Larry Joe Campbell as Mike
- Mike Lane as Mason
- Julie Claire as Vivian Prescott
- Stephanie McVay as Chelsea
- Gary Anthony Williams as Warren
- Ellie Reed as Mackenzie
- Konstantin Lavysh as Sergei
- Johnathan McClain as Mark
- Winston Story as Dane
- Andrew Ridings as Russell
- Amanda Carlin as Alice
- Rick Overton as Burt

== Episodes ==
No. overall	No. in season	Title	Directed by	Written by	Original release date	Prod. code	U.S. viewers (millions)
111	1	"Pre-Washed Lettuce and a Mime"	James Widdoes	Story by : Nick Bakay & Gemma Baker & Alissa Neubauer; Teleplay by : Warren Bell & Marco Pennette & Adam Chase	September 27, 2018	T12.16101	7.94
Christy has a hard time juggling the workload at law school, her job at the restaurant, and going to meetings. She considers quitting school until a new AA attendee gives her perspective about overcoming obstacles. Elsewhere, Adam gives Bonnie permission to plan their wedding any way she wants, but she soon realizes that she wants him to be involved after she dreams he's having an affair. Title meaning: Bonnie describing how Adam cheated on her in her dream and who Bonnie jokingly wants to officiate their wedding.
112	2	"Go-Go Boots and a Butt Cushion"	James Widdoes	Story by : Warren Bell & Britté Anchor; Teleplay by : Gemma Baker & Alissa Neubauer & Sheldon Bull	October 4, 2018	T12.16102	7.83
With very little time in her life to get her studies done, Christy considers quitting Gambler's Anonymous, thinking she doesn't need it because she's only had three incidents in her life. Bonnie disagrees with her daughter, and turns out to be correct when Christy gets a good-sized check for incidentals as part of her student loan and finds herself in a casino parking lot. Absent: William Fichtner as Adam Title meaning: What Bonnie wore to her first Alcoholics Anonymous meeting and a Gambler's Anonymous attendee named Lucy telling Christy what she didn’t need to bring to a new plush casino.
113	3	"Ambulance Chasers and a Babbling Brook"	James Widdoes	Story by : Gemma Baker & Alissa Neubauer; Teleplay by : Warren Bell & Sheldon Bull & Britté Anchor	October 11, 2018	T12.16103	8.21
Bonnie tries to trick Adam into choosing the outdoor venue she wants for their wedding by showing him an old barrel factory as an alternative, but it backfires. Although Adam agrees to Bonnie's wedding site, he uses his life savings to buy the barrel factory with hopes of turning it into a bar. Meanwhile, Christy learns her strict law professor, Natalie (Constance Zimmer) is a fellow alcoholic. Title meaning: Christy’s law professor, Professor Stevens, describing her students' futures and Bonnie describing her preferred site for the wedding with Adam
114	4	"Big Sauce and Coconut Water"	James Widdoes	Story by : Nick Bakay & Sheldon Bull & Susan McMartin; Teleplay by : Anne Flett-Giordano & Michael Shipley & Britté Anchor	October 18, 2018	T12.16104	8.12
After Tammy Diffendorf (Kristen Johnston) is paroled, Bonnie invites her to stay at the apartment instead of going to a halfway house. As Tammy struggles to integrate into free society, she starts to affect those around her, particularly Christy and Adam. Title meaning: Tammy's nickname for Bonnie and what Tammy is joyfully surprised to find in Bonnie’s refrigerator.
115	5	"Flying Monkeys and a Tank of Nitrous"	James Widdoes	Story by : Marco Pennette & Anne Flett-Giordano & Michael Shipley; Teleplay by : Nick Bakay & Adam Chase & Susan McMartin	October 25, 2018	T12.16105	7.98
Marjorie's husband Victor dies after another stroke, yet she does not seem as upset as Christy thinks she should be. Marjorie later admits that her first feeling after Victor died was relief, and she scolds herself for it. Wendy tells her that when someone passes who was ill for a long time, the survivors often already mourned for them. Marjorie finally breaks down while holding Victor's favorite cat. Title meaning: Christy saying what might scare Tammy if they bring her to the play Wicked and what Wendy used to keep in her bedroom.
116	6	"Cottage Cheese and a Weird Buzz"	James Widdoes	Story by : Nick Bakay & Adam Chase & Susan McMartin; Teleplay by : Marco Pennette & Anne Flett-Giordano & Michael Shipley	November 1, 2018	T12.16106	7.90
When Tammy takes on a loud home improvement project at the apartment, Christy spends time at Jill's house to get her studies done in peace. However, Christy gets mad when she sees what Jill does with the $75 payment on her gambling debt. Meanwhile, Bonnie talks Adam into both of them getting tattoos, later getting somewhat addicted to being inked. Absent: Beth Hall as Wendy Title meaning: Tammy describing the water damage on the wall behind the bookcase and Adam describing what Bonnie feels when she gets new tattoos.
117	7	"Puzzle Club and a Closet Party"	James Widdoes	Story by : Sheldon Bull & Britté Anchor; Teleplay by : Gemma Baker & Warren Bell & Alissa Neubauer	November 8, 2018	T12.16107	8.09
Christy and Wendy agree to help Jill clean out her huge walk-in closet with hopes of scoring some nice items for themselves, but the process reminds a dejected Jill of all her failures. Elsewhere, Bonnie invites a lonely Marjorie to spend time at the apartment, where they do a jigsaw puzzle with Tammy. Seeing Marjorie needing companionship with Victor gone, Bonnie suggests that Tammy move in with her. Absent: William Fichtner as Adam Title meaning: What Tammy and Marjorie name their club while doing a jigsaw puzzle with Bonnie and what Christy says to lighten the mood in Jill’s closet.
118	8	"Jell-O Shots and the Truth about Santa"	James Widdoes	Story by : Susan McMartin & Anne Flett-Giordano; Teleplay by : Gemma Baker & Adam Chase & Sheldon Bull	November 15, 2018	T12.16108	7.93
One of Christy's study partners mentions a podcast she listens to about "the nightmare of all mothers". Christy decides to listen to it, and learns that it is Violet speaking about her. Christy appears on the podcast to share her side, but it does little to reconcile herself with Violet. Elsewhere, the opening night for Adam's bar is not very successful after Bonnie invites a bunch of non-drinkers from AA. Special guest star: Sadie Calvano as Violet. This was Calvano's last appearance on the show. Title meaning: The title of one of Violet’s podcast episodes about Christy.
119	9	"Pork Loin and a Beat Up Monte Carlo"	James Widdoes	Story by : Warren Bell & Alissa Neubauer; Teleplay by : Nick Bakay & Marco Pennette & Britté Anchor	November 29, 2018	T12.16109	7.47
Christy uses past experiences to face off against the best student in her class in a mock trial, with hopes of earning a summer internship with a local law firm. Though Christy wins the case, the internship still goes to her opponent. An angry Christy confronts the law firm rep, who says he passed her over for the internship to offer her a paid position instead. Meanwhile, Tammy has dental surgery that leaves her in pain, forcing Bonnie to manage her pain medication. Title meaning: A recipe that Bonnie finds in a magazine at the dentist’s office and the car of a deceased man that Bonnie got in Oklahoma to stash her drugs.
120	10	"Flamingos and a Dance-Based Exercise Class"	James Widdoes	Story by : Gemma Baker & Adam Chase & Susan McMartin; Teleplay by : Sheldon Bull & Anne Flett-Giordano & Michael Shipley	December 6, 2018	T12.16111	7.92
After bumming a cigarette from Chef Rudy, Christy finds herself developing her old smoking habit. Elsewhere, Tammy goes on her first date since getting out of prison, but gets conflicting advice from Bonnie and Jill. Special guest star: French Stewart as Chef Rudy Absent: William Fitchner as Adam Title meaning: Bonnie's comments about Marjorie's legwarmers and Wendy describing Zumba.
121	11	"Foot Powder and the Barrelworks Pirates"	James Widdoes	Story by : Marco Pennette & Alissa Neubauer & Britté Anchor; Teleplay by : Nick Bakay & Warren Bell & Susan McMartin	December 13, 2018	T12.16110	7.72
When the ladies from AA decide to participate in a Secret Santa gift exchange, Christy goes to great lengths to surprise and delight Wendy. Meanwhile, Bonnie tries to help Tammy find a job and prevent her from being sent back to prison, and Adam tries to hide from Bonnie the fact that his bar is losing money. Title meaning: Part of a Christmas present that Tammy is giving to her parole officer and the Little League team uniforms that Adam has to pay for.
122	12	"Hacky Sack and a Beautiful Experience"	James Widdoes	Story by : Sheldon Bull & Anne Flett-Giordano; Teleplay by : Gemma Baker & Adam Chase & Michael Shipley	January 10, 2019	T12.16112	9.35
Christy, Marjorie, Jill, Wendy and Tammy take a road trip to see a woman who is famous for her hugging therapy, but Christy's smoking habit causes her to lose their tickets. Meanwhile, Bonnie and Adam disagree about ideas to save the bar from financial disaster. Title meaning: What the ushers started to play and what the ladies miss out on when they don't have the tickets.
123	13	"Big Floor Pillows and a Ball of Fire"	James Widdoes	Story by : Warren Bell & Adam Chase & Michael Shipley; Teleplay by : Nick Bakay & Susan McMartin & Anne Flett-Giordano	January 17, 2019	T12.16114	8.45
Adam's friend Mitch (Bradley Whitford) is in town to make amends to Christy and Bonnie, who reluctantly accept his apologies. Mitch claims to be sober, saying it caused his breakup with Leanne (Nicole Sullivan) when she refused to stop drinking. But on his first visit to Adam's bar, Mitch is back to his old ways. Title meaning: Jill describing how she does meditation and Mitch describing what God didn’t send him to.
124	14	"Kalamazoo and a Bad Wedge of Brie"	James Widdoes	Story by : Nick Bakay & Warren Bell & Susan McMartin; Teleplay by : Marco Pennette & Alissa Neubauer & Britté Anchor	January 31, 2019	T12.16113	8.55
After a break-in at Jill's house, a police officer named Andy (Will Sasso) is assigned to guard the place for a few days. Despite their differences, the two divorcees bond and Jill starts to enjoy having Andy around. Meanwhile, Christy becomes frustrated when Nora doesn't offer much validation of their sponsor-sponsee relationship. Absent: William Fitchner as Adam Title meaning: The brand of grill that Jill has in her backyard and what Andy says people call 911 for in Napa Valley.
125	15	"Sparkling Banter and a Failing Steel Town"	James Widdoes	Story by : Alissa Neubauer & Britté Anchor; Teleplay by : Gemma Baker & Marco Pennette & Adam Chase	February 14, 2019	T12.16115	7.64
At a Valentine's Day dinner with Bonnie, Christy laments her empty love life and blames Bonnie for her lack of trust in men, but Marjorie (whose plans to watch Notting Hill keep getting interrupted by pleas for advice from her friends) clues Bonnie in and the situation ends on a much nicer note. Jill goes on a first date with Andy, but Andy later leaves after overhearing Jill tell one of her highbrow friends that Andy is just her security guard and not a date. Tammy has sex for the first time in seven years while riding with Yuri. Absent: William Fitchner as Adam Title meaning: Yuri describing Tammy's conversations with his Uber passengers and Andy telling the waitress where his craft beer should be from.
126	16	"Skippy and the Knowledge Hole"	James Widdoes	Story by : Gemma Baker & Marco Pennette; Teleplay by : Alissa Neubauer & Sheldon Bull & Britté Anchor	February 21, 2019	T12.16116	8.41
When Christy gets her credit card bill and sees how much she spent on cigarettes, she tries to quit, making her irritable around the rest of the group. Tammy encourages Bonnie to take the GED exam with her, but Bonnie fails. After Bonnie describes to the group how she felt while taking the test, Wendy suggests she may have Attention Deficit Disorder. Title meaning: The brand of peanut butter that Bonnie thinks would be funny to feed to Marjorie's cats and Christy's description of Marjorie's mouth.
127	17	"A Dark Closet and Therapy with Horses"	James Widdoes	Story by : Sheldon Bull & Anne Flett-Giordano & Michael Shipley; Teleplay by : Nick Bakay & Warren Bell & Susan McMartin	March 7, 2019	T12.16117	8.30
While helping Adam at the bar during the March Madness rush, Christy gets caught up with a group of guys using phone apps to bet on every aspect of the games. Although Christy doesn't make any bets herself, she receives tip money for making correct picks for the guys, causing her to ask her GA sponsor if it counts as gambling. Meanwhile, Bonnie is at her prickly but vulnerable best during her first sessions with her new A.D.D. therapist, Trevor (Rainn Wilson). Title meaning: Trevor's comments during Bonnie's session and Bonnie asking Trevor for alternatives to medication.
128	18	"Soup Town and a Little Blonde Mongoose"	Rebecca Ancheta Blum	Story by : Gemma Baker & Adam Chase & Sheldon Bull; Teleplay by : Anne Flett-Giordano & Michael Shipley & Britté Anchor	April 4, 2019	T12.16118	7.61
Bonnie gives up a chance to go with Adam to an Eagles concert so she can take care of Christy, who has a bad case of the flu. However, the challenge of being a mother to a sick child soon wears on Bonnie. Meanwhile, Jill, Marjorie, Wendy and Tammy notice a change in their group dynamic with the Plunketts' absent. Title meaning: Bonnie's description of caring for an ill Christy and Jill's term for Christy's role in the group.
129	19	"Lumbar Support and Old Pork"	James Widdoes	Story by : Nick Bakay & Warren Bell & Maria Espada Pearce; Teleplay by : Marco Pennette & Alissa Neubauer & Susan McMartin	April 18, 2019	T12.16119	6.62
Christy and Bonnie are surprised to open the refrigerator and find plentiful, name brand food, which Adam says he bought because the bar is doing well. Adam then surprises Bonnie with a new car at Baxter's dealership, but Bonnie refuses it because her decades-long experience tells her that good fortune never lasts. Elsewhere, Tammy encourages Christy to go on a date with Yuri's cousin, Sergei. Christy likes the guy until she sees him getting involved in some criminal activity, which she fears might affect Tammy's parole status. Christy tries to convince Yuri to throw his cousin out for Tammy's sake, but instead, he breaks up with Tammy. Special guest star: Matt Jones as Baxter. Jones' final appearance on the show. Title meaning: The seat cushions of Bonnie's new car and the food that Christy is willing to take her chances with in order to go on a date.
130	20	"Triple Dip and an Overhand Grip"	James Widdoes	Story by : Marco Pennette & Alissa Neubauer & Michael Shipley; Teleplay by : Nick Bakay & Sheldon Bull & Susan McMartin	April 25, 2019	T12.16121	7.91
Bonnie and Tammy take a trip to their old foster home to make amends to their former caretaker, Claire (Lois Smith). Angered that Claire blatantly favors Tammy, Bonnie confronts her, only to discover a secret about Tammy's troubled past. Elsewhere, while Marjorie and Wendy attend a play at the senior center, Christy and Jill hesitantly accept a coffee date with a pair of men from their Tuesday meeting. While the two women return from the date, Christy's car is stopped by Andy, who reconnects with Jill. Absent: William Fitchner as Adam Title meaning: The three dips Jill tells Christy to use while eating onion rings and Jill's description of how Christy's date, Mark, holds his fork.
131	21	"Finger Guns and a Beef Bourguignon"	James Widdoes	Story by : Gemma Baker & Britté Anchor & Chelsea Myers; Teleplay by : Warren Bell & Anne Flett-Giordano & Adam Chase	May 2, 2019	T12.16120	7.89
Despite owning a new car and having no place to park her old one, Bonnie is procrastinating on selling her old beater and being harsh to Adam when he tries to talk to her about it. Her ADD therapist, Trevor, tries to convince Bonnie that the car represents her old self, which she has grown out of but is hesitant to leave behind. Meanwhile, Christy is annoyed that her new law firm job involves grunt work and being ignored by a jerk of a junior associate, but later finds perverse pleasure in coming up with a sharp legal idea that the jerk passes off as his own work. Special guest star: French Stewart as Chef Rudy Title meaning: Christy's law firm boss, Russell, referring to her hand gesture as a microaggression and a complicated meal Bonnie is attempting to cook to put off getting rid of her old car.
132	22	"Crazy Hair and a Teeny Tiny Part of Canada"	James Widdoes	Story by : Warren Bell & Michael Shipley & Britté Anchor; Teleplay by : Gemma Baker & Adam Chase & Anne Flett-Giordano	May 9, 2019	T12.16122	8.08
On the day of her six-year "sober birthday", Christy is distraught after learning that Nora is moving to Minneapolis and can no longer be her sponsor. Elsewhere, Adam and Bonnie travel to Reno to pick up a vintage jukebox for the bar, and argue over Bonnie's reluctance to set a wedding date. Bonnie then angrily agrees to marry Adam immediately at a chapel in Reno, which further upsets Christy when the two return. Christy complains that her mother has shared terrible experiences with her, but cut her out of a wonderful one. Everyone gathers at the bar for a much nicer celebration, and Marjorie tells Christy she'd love to return as her sponsor. Title meaning: What Bonnie tells Adam to fix, and Nora describing the location where she will give her weather reports when she moves to Minneapolis.

== Ratings ==
Viewership and ratings per episode of Mom season 6
No.	Title	Air date	Rating/share (18–49)	Viewers (millions)	DVR (18–49)	DVR viewers (millions)	Total (18–49)	Total viewers (millions)
1	"Pre-Washed Lettuce and a Mime"	September 27, 2018	1.3/5	7.94	0.6	2.51	1.9	10.45
2	"Go-Go Boots and a Butt Cushion"	October 4, 2018	1.3/6	7.83	0.6	2.39	1.9	10.22
3	"Ambulance Chasers and a Babbling Brook"	October 11, 2018	1.3/5	8.21	0.6	2.32	1.9	10.53
4	"Big Sauce and Coconut Water"	October 18, 2018	1.3/5	8.12	0.6	2.30	1.9	10.42
5	"Flying Monkeys and a Tank of Nitrous"	October 25, 2018	1.2/5	7.98	0.5	2.29	1.7	10.28
6	"Cottage Cheese and a Weird Buzz"	November 1, 2018	1.2/5	7.90	0.6	2.41	1.8	10.31
7	"Puzzle Club and a Closet Party"	November 8, 2018	1.2/5	8.09	0.7	2.46	1.9	10.56
8	"Jell-O Shots and the Truth about Santa"	November 15, 2018	1.3/5	7.93	0.6	2.53	1.9	10.46
9	"Pork Loin and a Beat Up Monte Carlo"	November 29, 2018	1.1/5	7.47	0.6	2.18	1.7	9.65
10	"Flamingos and a Dance-Based Exercise Class"	December 6, 2018	1.1/5	7.92	0.7	2.52	1.8	10.44
11	"Foot Powder and the Barrelworks Pirates"	December 13, 2018	1.2/5	7.72	0.5	2.11	1.7	9.83
12	"Hacky Sack and a Beautiful Experience"	January 10, 2019	1.4/6	9.35	0.6	2.32	2.0	11.68
13	"Big Floor Pillows and a Ball of Fire"	January 17, 2019	1.2/5	8.45	0.7	2.40	1.9	10.86
14	"Kalamazoo and a Bad Wedge of Brie"	January 31, 2019	1.3/6	8.55	0.6	2.34	1.9	10.89
15	"Sparkling Banter and a Failing Steel Town"	February 14, 2019	1.1/5	7.64	0.6	2.29	1.7	9.93
16	"Skippy and the Knowledge Hole"	February 21, 2019	1.3/6	8.41	0.6	2.33	1.9	10.74
17	"A Dark Closet and Therapy with Horses"	March 7, 2019	1.2/6	8.30	0.7	2.53	1.9	10.83
18	"Soup Town and a Little Blonde Mongoose"	April 4, 2019	1.1/5	7.61	0.5	2.18	1.6	9.80
19	"Lumbar Support and Old Pork"	April 18, 2019	1.0/5	6.62	0.5	2.18	1.5	8.69
20	"Triple Dip and an Overhand Grip"	April 25, 2019	1.0/5	7.91	0.5	2.31	1.5	10.16
21	"Fingers Guns and a Beef Bourguignon"	May 2, 2019	1.1/5	7.89	0.5	2.29	1.6	10.18
22	"Crazy Hair and a Teeny Tiny Part of Canada"	May 9, 2019	1.1/5	8.08	0.5	2.15	1.6	10.24
