= Pilot (Life on a Stick) =

- Life on a Stick episode
- Episode no.: Season 1 Episode 1
- Directed by: Andy Ackerman
- Written by: Victor Fresco
- Production code: 100
- Original air date: March 24, 2005

Guest appearances
- Frankie Ryan Manriquez; Maz Jobrani; Ryan Belleville

Episode chronology
← Previous —	Next → "Liking Things the Way They Aren't"

"Pilot" is the pilot episode of the television show Life on a Stick. It was written by Victor Fresco, directed by Andy Ackerman, and first aired on March 25, 2005. It followed American Idol, with strong initial ratings which gave FOX its strongest numbers in six years. "Pilot" was delayed one day in its debut. On March 22, American Idol provided its viewers with an incorrect voting telephone number. On March 23, "Pilot" was replaced with an American Idol re-vote episode, and finally aired on the 24th.

== Plot synopsis ==
The episode starts with Laz needing to find a job after leaving Yippee Hot Dogs, else he must leave his parents' house forever. He must also take his sister Molly under his wing, although why his parents consider him a good influence is never explained.

Laz returns to work at the Yippee Hot Dogs food court restaurant. He finds that working life is no different from high school with its cliques and power people. Laz and his friend Fred (also a Yippee employee) clash with their boss and attempt to start an employee rebellion, ultimately deep frying everything in their boss' office.

== Reception ==
Lucio Guerrero of the Chicago Sun-Times described the pilot as "more like a Nickelodeon show than a Fox production." Nat Gertler noted that the main characters speak primarily in expository dialog, which can sometimes work, but felt that these actors are unable to pull it off. Toni Fitzgerald of Media Life Magazine felt that Pilot was not funny, and that the second episode, "Liking Things the Way They Aren't," had a much funnier premise. "Pilot" debuted on the same day as the first episode of the American version of The Office, with the former attracting 9.2 million viewers and the latter 11.2 million viewers.
