= The Trouble with Normal (TV series) =

American sitcom

- Also known as: People Who Fear People
- Genre: Sitcom
- Created by: Victor Fresco
- Starring: Paget Brewster; Larry Joe Campbell; Jon Cryer; David Krumholtz; Brad Raider
- Composer: Bruce Miller
- Country of origin: United States
- Original language: English
- No. of seasons: 1
- No. of episodes: 13 (8 unaired)

Production
- Executive producers: Victor Fresco; Andy Ackerman; Paget Brewster; Tim Doyle
- Camera setup: Multi-camera
- Running time: 30 minutes
- Production companies: Garfield Grove Productions; Touchstone Television; Paramount Television

Original release
- Network: ABC
- Release: October 6 – November 3, 2000

The Trouble with Normal is an American television sitcom that originally aired on ABC from October 6 to November 3, 2000. The show starred Paget Brewster, Larry Joe Campbell, Jon Cryer, David Krumholtz, and Brad Raider and was produced by Garfield Grove Productions, Touchstone Television and Paramount Television.

== Overview ==
The show was described as "the misadventures of four paranoid young men whose fear of urban conspiracy leads them to seek counseling in a therapy group run by therapist Claire Garletti." Recurring members of the therapy group were played by Jim Beaver and Patricia Belcher.

== Cast ==
- Paget Brewster as Claire Garletti
- Larry Joe Campbell as Stansfield Schlick
- Jon Cryer as Zack Mango
- David Krumholtz as Bob Wexler
- Brad Raider as Max Perch

== Production ==
A total of thirteen episodes of the series were ordered by ABC and completed. It was one of four series planned in order to reformat the network's Friday night block from the family sitcoms of the "TGIF" era to a more adult direction, including a marketing tie-in with KFC to feature the shows in the new Friday night lineup on the chicken chain's packaging. However, the network aired only five of those episodes in the United States before the series was canceled. All thirteen episodes were later aired in Australia.

The series was originally titled People Who Fear People. Director James Burrows was involved in the initial project but did not participate in the retitled series. Original cast members Maria Pitillo and Mackenzie Astin were replaced by Paget Brewster and Brad Raider.

== Episodes ==
No.	Title	Directed by	Written by	Original release date	Prod. code
1	"Pilot (AKA People Who Fear People)"	Andy Ackerman	Victor Fresco	October 6, 2000	40318-001
New neighbors Bob and Zach are each paranoid that the other is spying on them.
2	"Not the Pilot"	Andy Ackerman	Jennifer Celotta	October 13, 2000	40318-002
When the guys get dates, Claire reluctantly accompanies them to a bar for moral support.
3	"Clairanoia"	Andy Ackerman	Michael A. Ross	Unaired	40318-003
The guys become jealous when they discover Claire has another group. Note: This episode was scheduled to air on November 10, 2000. It was replaced by an additional episode of its lead-in, Two Guys and a Girl. This happened so quickly that some sources incorrectly list this as airing.
4	"Mail Trouble"	Andy Ackerman	David Walpert	October 27, 2000	40318-004
When Stansfield begins delivering Claire's mail, she complains and gets him re-routed, leaving an elderly lady and a prepubescent boy to take the fall.
5	"Unconventional Behavior"	Andy Ackerman	Jennifer Celotta	Unaired	40318-005
When the group attends a conspiracy convention, Bob criticizes Max's marriage, Stansfield connects with a woman (Amy Landers), and Claire discovers her new boyfriend (Charles Esten) believes in aliens.
6	"Say Cheese"	Lee Shallat-Chemel	Steve Faber & Bob Fisher	Unaired	40318-006
Claire complains on the guys' behalf when a surveillance camera is installed in their lobby, and suddenly she finds her own apartment is on the market and her utilities have been cut. Guest-stars David Ogden Stiers.
7	"Psychologists Without Borders"	Lee Shallat-Chemel	Gail Lerner	October 20, 2000	40318-007
A noisy neighbor (Sherri Shepherd) has been keeping Claire awake at night, so the guys try to intervene, but the situation backfires when Claire attempts to instate new boundaries. Also guest-stars Jonathan Banks.
8	"Owl Show Ya"	Lee Shallat-Chemel	Michael Shipley & Jim Bernstein	November 3, 2000	40318-008
To step out of their comfort zone, Bob gets an owl and Stansford takes a dance class. Guest stars Constance Zimmer.
9	"Speech! Speech!"	Andy Ackerman	David Walpert	Unaired	40318-009
The guys attempt to boost Claire's career by booking her in various engagements, unaware that she's terrified of public speaking.
10	"Help Yourself"	Andy Ackerman	Michael A. Ross	Unaired	40318-010
When Zack lands a job at Bob's company, he goes mad with power ordering office supplies. Meanwhile, Stansfield tries to bond with his childhood idol (Eugene Roche). Guest stars Charlie Robinson and Constance Zimmer.
11	"Spy vs. Guy"	Andy Ackerman	Steve Faber & Bob Fisher	Unaired	40318-011
Zack has another date with Dora (Maria Bamford), but he has trouble getting past her occupation: FBI agent. Meanwhile, with Zack dating Dora and Bob dating Kristen (Constance Zimmer), Max and Stansfield find themselves awkwardly hanging out together.
12	"Chez Schlick"	Jeff McCracken	Jennifer Celotta	Unaired	40318-012
Stansfield gets his own apartment so he can be alone with Claire's sister (Bess Meyer). Meanwhile, Bob wakes up with a nipple ring, which causes complications with a nurse who finds it sexy.
13	"Manhattan Transference"	Andy Ackerman	Story by : Gail Lerner; Teleplay by : Michael Shipley & Jim Bernstein	Unaired	40318-013
Bob and Claire realize they have feelings for one another, but their doctor-patient relationship and his girlfriend stand in their way. Meanwhile, the other guys hang out with a cool guy who encourages them to sing.
