= Mom season 7 =

Season of American television series

Mom
- Season 7
- Starring: Anna Faris; Allison Janney; Mimi Kennedy; Jaime Pressly; Beth Hall; William Fichtner; Kristen Johnston
- No. of episodes: 20

Release
- Original network: CBS
- Original release: September 26, 2019 – April 16, 2020

Season chronology
- ← Previous; Season 6 Next → Season 8

The seventh season of the situational comedy drama Mom began on September 26, 2019 and concluded on April 16, 2020 on CBS in the United States. The season is produced by Chuck Lorre Productions and Warner Bros. Television, with series creators Chuck Lorre, Eddie Gorodetsky and Gemma Baker serving as executive producer. The season finished with 20 episodes, a reduction from the planned 22 episodes that was forced by the COVID-19 pandemic. This is the final season to feature Anna Faris as Christy, with "Big Sad Eyes and an Antique Hot Dog" becoming the show's unintended season finale/farewell episode for Faris.

Christy (Anna Faris) is still sober and has her life mostly back on track, though she's continually tested by her mother, Bonnie (Allison Janney). Together, the two work to overcome their mistakes and build a better future. Now, Christy is well on her way to becoming a lawyer, while Bonnie is in a healthy romantic relationship and has just married Adam (William Fichtner). Through it all, Christy and Bonnie rely on their support system from AA, including the wise Marjorie (Mimi Kennedy), the wealthy and sometimes misguided Jill (Jaime Pressly), the overly emotional Wendy (Beth Hall), and the loudmouth but sweet Tammy (Kristen Johnston), who was upgraded to series regular status for this season. Collectively, they help each other stay sober in the face of whatever life throws at them. The episodes are usually titled with two odd topics that are mentioned in that episode.

Season seven of Mom aired Thursdays in the United States at 9:00 p.m. after The Unicorn in the first half of the season and Man with a Plan in the second half.

== Cast ==
=== Main ===
- Anna Faris as Christy Plunkett
- Allison Janney as Bonnie Plunkett
- Mimi Kennedy as Marjorie Armstrong-Perugian
- Jaime Pressly as Jill Kendall
- Beth Hall as Wendy Harris
- William Fichtner as Adam Janikowski
- Kristen Johnston as Tammy Diffendorf

=== Recurring ===
- Rainn Wilson as Trevor Wells
- Will Sasso as Andy
- French Stewart as Chef Rudy
- Reggie de Leon as Paul
- Lauri Johnson as Beatrice
- Chiquita Fuller as Taylor
- Charlie Robinson as Mr. Munson
- Mary Pat Gleason as Mary

=== Special guest stars ===
- Kate Micucci as Patty
- Reginald Veljohnson as Jim
- John Ratzenberger as Stan
- Paget Brewster as Veronica Stone
- Kathleen Turner as Cookie
- Peter Onorati as Wayne
- Courtney Thorne-Smith as Sam

=== Guest stars ===
- Jim Turner as Rick
- Phil Buckman as Marv
- Bernie Kopell as Ken
- Jayson Blair as DJ
- Andrew Caldwell as Todd
- Lauren Weedman as Angela
- Mario Cantone as Sean
- Kirstin Eggers as Janice
- Parisa Fakhri as Laurie
- Tim Chiou as Kevin
- Keone Young as George
- Anna Maria Horsford as Eve Ferguson
- Larry Joe Campbell as Mike
- Michelle Arthur as Belinda
- Wallace Langham as Jerry
- Jennifer Marsala as Amber
- Karen Malina White as Natalie
- Ted McGinley as Dr. Berenson
- Tracy Vilar as Lorraine
- Patricia Bethune as Wanda
- Gillian Vigman as Melanie
- Miriam Flynn as Arlene
- Carolyn Hennesy as Professor Winslow
- Isla Rose Burton as Baby Sofia
- Virginia Montero as Marta
- Amy Pietz as Rebecca

== Episodes ==
No. overall	No. in season	Title	Directed by	Written by	Original release date	Prod. code	U.S. viewers (millions)
133	1	"Audrey Hepburn and a Jalapeño Pepper"	James Widdoes	Story by : Gemma Baker & Britté Anchor & Robyn Morrison; Teleplay by : Warren Bell & Alissa Neubauer & Adam Chase	September 26, 2019	T12.16401	6.25
During her honeymoon at a cabin by the lake with Adam, Bonnie finds herself sabotaging her own happiness without the support that AA meetings provide, but finds stability and then purpose when she begins helping a very troubled young alcoholic mom named Patty. Meanwhile, Adam leaves Christy in charge of the bar, much to Tammy's chagrin. However, when an optimistic Christy tries to implement cost-saving and efficiency measures, the employees refuse to come to work and Christy needs help from her friends to save the day. Title meaning: The celebrity Bonnie compares Adam to when he is wearing his sunglasses and the wrong appetizer Tammy serves at the bar.
134	2	"Pop Pop and a Puma"	James Widdoes	Story by : Marco Pennette & Sheldon Bull & Susan McMartin; Teleplay by : Nick Bakay & Ilana Wernick & Anne Flett-Giordano	October 3, 2019	T12.16404	6.28
An under-staffed Adam asks Christy to help tend the bar. However, when Christy reacts to a customer who insulted her, Adam asks her to apologize, causing a rift between the two and leaving Bonnie to choose sides. Meanwhile, Andy feels insecure when Jill is seemingly better than him at the gym and during a paintball game. Title meaning: One of the names Christy wants to call Adam and the animal Andy compares Jill to when she intervenes to Heimlich a choking man.
135	3	"Goat Yogurt and Ample Parking"	James Widdoes	Story by : Warren Bell & Alissa Neubauer; Teleplay by : Gemma Baker & Adam Chase & Britté Anchor	October 10, 2019	T12.16402	5.78
Succumbing to her loud and hostile new boss Veronica's demands, Christy and the girls go to a marijuana dispensary for the tightly-wound woman. However, when Christy finds her boss high in the office, it is up to Christy to help her get sober for an impending meeting. Meanwhile, Bonnie has second thoughts about taking Adam's last name. Title meaning: Christy's boss's snack and part of Bonnie's lie to Adam about going to the social security office to get her name changed.
136	4	"Twirly Flippy Men and a Dirty Bird"	James Widdoes	Story by : Marco Pennette & Ilana Wernick & Anne Flett-Giordano; Teleplay by : Sheldon Bull & Susan McMartin & Chelsea Myers	October 17, 2019	T12.16403	5.81
When Chef Rudy is court-mandated to attend 10 AA meetings as compensation for a DUI, he tags along with Christy whose patience wears thin due to his condescending attitude. Meanwhile, after eating chocolate from Adam's night stand, Bonnie learns that her husband doesn't feel at home, prompting her to let him bring some of his personal belongings out of storage and into the apartment. Special guest star: French Stewart as Chef Rudy Title meaning: The figurines of players on the foosball table that Jill wouldn't let her ex-husband buy and the name Bonnie calls Marjorie when telling Adam that Marjorie was asking about their sex life.
137	5	"Fake Bacon and a Plan to Kill All of Us"	James Widdoes	Story by : Gemma Baker & Adam Chase; Teleplay by : Warren Bell & Alissa Neubauer & Britté Anchor	October 24, 2019	T12.16406	6.34
When group eccentric Mary (Mary Pat Gleason) passes away unexpectedly during a meeting, the rest of the group is left to cope in various different ways: Jill throws an over-the-top memorial, Christy uses her legal skills to try and get Mary's grandson out of jail, Tammy fears that Marjorie will die next, Bonnie is distraught because the last thing she said to Mary was something mean and resolves to be a better person, and Wendy becomes a shut-in after feeling that her "friends" don't know or care about her any more than they did about Mary. Absent: William Fichtner as Adam Title meaning: Bonnie's comments on the turkey bacon in Marjorie's BLT and a thought Tammy expresses at the bistro in the aftermath of Mary's death.
138	6	"Wile E. Coyote and a Possessed Doll"	Rebecca Ancheta Blum	Story by : Marco Pennette & Susan McMartin & Anne Flett-Giordano; Teleplay by : Nick Bakay & Sheldon Bull & Ilana Wernick	November 7, 2019	T12.16408	6.20
After seeing an old videotape of Adam on a movie set before his spinal injury, Bonnie tries to figure out why she is obsessed over it. Trevor helps her realize she's thinking that "walking Adam" would have never chosen to be with a woman like herself. Adam convinces Bonnie that the old version of himself was not nice to women, and that they found each other at just the right time. Meanwhile, Christy starts behaving erratically as the numerous stresses of placating her boss Veronica start piling up. Title meaning: Bonnie comparing Adam's accident to a Wile E. Coyote cartoon and Christy's new attitude to that of a horror movie doll.
139	7	"Pork Butt and a Mall Walker"	James Widdoes	Story by : Nick Bakay & Sheldon Bull & Ilana Wernick; Teleplay by : Marco Pennette & Susan McMartin & Anne Flett-Giordano	November 14, 2019	T12.16405	6.28
After Bonnie relays a bad experience while she and Adam were on a couples date with two other people, Jill suggests that she and Andy become their couple friends. However, when Adam and Andy drink heavily during a cookout, Jill expresses concern that being around "that kind of drinking" could cause her to relapse. Meanwhile, Tammy secretly tells Christy that she can no longer tolerate living with Marjorie and wants to move out, but Christy gets Tammy to reconsider after Marjorie discloses that she's having money problems. Title meaning: An item Andy prepares on Jill's Kalamazoo grill and Tammy's remark about an activity Marjorie's age group likes to do.
140	8	"Hot Butter and Toxic Narcissism"	James Widdoes	Story by : Alissa Neubauer & Adam Chase; Teleplay by : Gemma Baker & Warren Bell & Britté Anchor	November 21, 2019	T12.16407	6.06
Bonnie is angry that Adam has stopped listening to her, and turns to her "friend" therapist Trevor for help; she later finds out something about Trevor's own unhappy life, and is sympathetic when Adam reveals why he's so preoccupied. Christy has a meet-cute with a guy whose parents own a car she backed into, after she does the right thing and notifies them. Later, the women gather at Jill's to watch Footloose. Title meaning: A topping on the mashed potatoes that Bonnie threw at Adam in anger and an insult hurled at Trevor by his wife during an argument that Bonnie overhears.
141	9	"Tuna Florentine and a Clean Handoff"	James Widdoes	Story by : Warren Bell & Ilana Wernick & Anne Flett-Giordano; Teleplay by : Nick Bakay & Susan McMartin & Britté Anchor	December 5, 2019	T12.16409	6.07
After Tammy's parole officer grants her an early release from probation, Tammy struggles with how to live "rules-free" for the first time in many years and clashes with Adam and anyone else she sees as an authority figure. Meanwhile, Bonnie is giddy over giving Adam a leather jacket for his birthday that he saw on TV and liked, but she quickly turns angry when Adam doesn't seem interested in wearing it. Also, Jill is worried over her recent bouts of sleeplessness, knowing she can't take any medications that would help. Title meaning: The high-end food Tammy feeds to Marjorie's cats and her description of handing over her urine sample to the parole board without spilling any.
142	10	"Higgledy-Piggledy and a Cat Show"	James Widdoes	Story by : Warren Bell & Britté Anchor; Teleplay by : Gemma Baker & Alissa Neubauer & Adam Chase	December 12, 2019	T12.16410	6.25
Bonnie invites her troubled AA sponsee Patty to spend Christmas with her and Christy. While the combination of Patty's sad family status and Christy's stories of Bonnie's holiday mayhem and neglect drive Bonnie into a horrified, tearful reflection on her past self, she is able to pull herself out of it and do good work in the present. Elsewhere, Jill annoyingly obsesses over a picture Andy sent from his visit to Minnesota. Later, the group decides to join Wendy for some therapeutic caroling. Title meaning: Jill's term for the unwanted reorganization of the coffee table Tammy set up at a meeting, and the event Marjorie was headed to long ago when she had her own past-reflecting emotional breakdown.
143	11	"One Tiny Incision and a Coffin Dress"	James Widdoes	Story by : Sheldon Bull & Ilana Wernick & Susan McMartin; Teleplay by : Nick Bakay & Marco Pennette & Anne Flett Giordano	January 9, 2020	T12.16411	5.99
Tammy gets a call from her long lost Aunt Cookie (Kathleen Turner), who claims she just recently found out Tammy existed since she had cut ties with the family before Tammy was born. The two get along great, but Cookie quickly admits she only went looking for Tammy because she needs a kidney. Tammy decides to go ahead and get tested to find out if she is a match for Cookie. While Tammy is getting tested, Cookie accidentally lets it slip to Bonnie that she's known about Tammy ever since her mother got pregnant with her. Tammy gets angry and doesn't think she'll ever be able to forgive Cookie for leaving her in the foster-care system. Bonnie assures her that one day she will, the same way Bonnie was able to forgive her mother for dumping her at a fire station. Later, Tammy meets Cookie for lunch and tells her she has no desire for a relationship, but will still donate her kidney if she's a match. Absent: William Fichtner as Adam Title meaning: Wendy's description of the surgery required to remove a donor kidney and Jill discussing what she hopes to be wearing for her own funeral.
144	12	"Silly Frills and a Depressed Garden Gnome"	James Widdoes	Story by : Gemma Baker & Marco Pennette; Teleplay by : Alissa Neubauer & Adam Chase & Sheldon Bull	January 16, 2020	T12.16412	6.30
Marjorie is surprised to get a call from her estranged son, Jerry, inviting her to meet her newborn granddaughter (Isla Rose Burton). However, she makes a comment that dredges up old memories, and Jerry throws her out. Despite Marjorie telling them not to meddle, Christy and Bonnie use their own experiences to try and convince Jerry that people can change. Elsewhere, while installing a shelf for Jill, Tammy sees firsthand how her friend treats the help--and she makes it very clear to Jill she won't stand for it. Absent: William Fichtner as Adam Title meaning: The little details that Tammy removed from Jill's shelf after she demanded it and Bonnie describing Marjorie when she saw her sitting on the curb of Jerry's house.
145	13	"Dammit Sandra and Viking Ancestors"	James Widdoes	Story by : Nick Bakay & Susan McMartin & Britté Anchor; Teleplay by : Warren Bell & Ilana Wernick & Anne Flett-Giordano	January 30, 2020	T12.16413	6.08
Bonnie resists her friends' efforts to help her deal with negative thoughts, and also rejects Trevor's guidelines upon seeing that Trevor's marriage has fallen apart. Bonnie ultimately fires Trevor, but conversations with Christy and Adam reveal that her sessions were working and get her to return to therapy. Elsewhere, Tammy makes repairs on the walk-in freezer at Christy's restaurant, leading to an ill-advised hook-up with Chef Rudy. Special guest star: French Stewart as Chef Rudy Title meaning: Trevor's exclamation upon seeing that his ex-wife took his San Francisco Giants snow globe and Chef Rudy's attempt at guessing Tammy's ancestry.
146	14	"Cheddar Cheese and a Squirrel Circus"	James Widdoes	Story by : Alissa Neubauer & Sheldon Bull; Teleplay by : Gemma Baker & Marco Pennette & Adam Chase	February 6, 2020	T12.16415	6.34
Bonnie grows suspicious of Tammy's Aunt Cookie, believing that the woman is not taking the kidney donation and her second chance at life seriously. Meanwhile, Christy tries to track down a handsome man who smiled at her in the hospital. Absent: William Fichtner as Adam Title meaning: One of the items on the omelette that a nurse requested and part of a story that Cookie tells Tammy about her mother.
147	15	"Somebody's Grandmother and the A-List"	James Widdoes	Story by : Gemma Baker & Adam Chase; Teleplay by : Marco Pennette & Alissa Neubauer & Sheldon Bull	February 13, 2020	T12.16414	6.27
While preparing for a charity event to be held at her house, Jill notices that several pieces of silverware are missing. She wrongfully assumes that one of her housekeepers stole from her, only for Bonnie to admit to having taken and sold the pieces five years ago, which causes a huge rift between them. Meanwhile, Christy helps Marjorie prepare for her first date since Victor's death. Title meaning: Bonnie's comment to Jill about who might have previously owned her gift of pawned silverware and Jill's desire to host the perfect event and be welcomed back into the fold of her socialite friends.
148	16	"Judy Garland and a Sexy Troll Doll"	Betsy Thomas	Story by : Alissa Neubauer & Adam Chase; Teleplay by : Gemma Baker & Marco Pennette & Sheldon Bull	February 20, 2020	T12.16416	6.28
After Jill confirms she is starting perimenopause, she decides to tell Andy she wants to have a baby and his response is uncomfortable; they later resolve this and Jill plans to freeze her eggs, only to get devastating news from her doctor. Meanwhile, Christy's dismay over being denied a spot on the law school's mock trial team leads her to strongly consider Jill's offer to pay for Christy to freeze her eggs as well. Wendy gets a promotion at work, but the group's plans to celebrate it don't entirely work out. Title meaning: Andy's comparison of who Jill has been acting like and Bonnie describing the hair trait that Adam would pass on to their children if they had met when they were younger.
149	17	"Beef Baloney Dan and a Sarcastic No"	James Widdoes	Story by : Warren Bell & Anne Flett-Giordano & Britté Anchor; Teleplay by : Nick Bakay & Ilana Wernick & Susan McMartin	March 5, 2020	T12.16417	5.82
Bonnie becomes irritated when she learns Adam never told her that his Al-Anon sponsor Sam is a woman (Courtney Thorne-Smith). Adam tries to prove it's no big deal, but in doing so, only confirms Bonnie's fears. Meanwhile, Tammy reveals that she's still interested in Chef Rudy, but is "playing the game" to make him want her more. Christy tries to use Tammy's techniques on a hot guy in their meeting, but fails badly. Special guest star: French Stewart as Chef Rudy Title meaning: The name Adam is known by at the deli counter because he missed his window to correct the clerk and Bonnie questioning Adam's response about whether she is the worst alcoholic discussed in his meetings.
150	18	"A Judgy Face and Your Grandma's Drawers"	James Widdoes	Story by : Gemma Baker & Marco Pennette; Teleplay by : Alissa Neubauer & Adam Chase & Sheldon Bull	March 12, 2020	T12.16419	6.35
Marjorie is overjoyed to finally be trusted (reluctantly) by her son to watch her granddaughter Sofia (Isla Rose Burton). But a medical emergency for one of her cats leads Marjorie to enlist Christy to help, and a chain of comedic errors brings Bonnie, Jill, and Tammy (and avowedly NOT anti-babies Wendy) into the circle of successfully taking care of the little girl. Title meaning: The face Bonnie accuses Sofia of making and the comment Bonnie makes to Sofia about the two of them rifling through Marjorie's bedroom and dresser drawers.
151	19	"Texas Pete and a Parking Lot Carnival"	James Widdoes	Story by : Nick Bakay & Warren Bell & Susan McMartin; Teleplay by : Anne Flett-Giordano & Britté Anchor & Robyn Morrison	April 2, 2020	T12.16418	7.62
With Bonnie's therapist, Trevor, in a stupor over his divorce and new living quarters, it is up to Bonnie and Tammy to bring him back to reality. Meanwhile, Marjorie is hired to deliver Chinese food, but she quickly finds re-entering the workforce overwhelming and calls on Christy, Jill, and Wendy for assistance. Seeing that he can use his skills to ease Marjorie's fears helps Trevor get over his own self-loathing. Title meaning: The type of hot sauce Bonnie finds in Trevor's kitchen while attempting to make him tea and one of the jobs available to newly-released prisoners that Tammy mentions at the bistro.
152	20	"Big Sad Eyes and an Antique Hot Dog"	James Widdoes	Story by : Adam Chase & Sheldon Bull & Anne Flett-Giordano; Teleplay by : Nick Bakay & Susan McMartin & Britté Anchor	April 16, 2020	T12.16420	7.14
At Marjorie's request, all of the women from AA decide to attend a sober retreat together. Initially, Marjorie plans every detail of the weekend, including the pairings of roommates: Christy and Bonnie, Tammy and Marjorie, and Jill and Wendy. When the women stop for gas, Marjorie and Wendy go inside, and Tammy, Christy, Bonnie, and Jill decide to change the roommate situation. At the retreat, Tammy tries to convince Jill to loan her money for a van that she needs for her construction business, Bonnie attempts to write a book, Jill is concerned about the cleanliness of the inn, Christy meets a woman in recovery who has been to the retreat before, Marjorie grows tired of being the group's leader, and Wendy gets food poisoning from a gas-station hot dog she ate en route to the retreat. Over the course of the weekend, different women try to avoid one another, but ultimately everyone ends up in the original pairings that Marjorie had planned. Absent: William Fichtner as Adam Title meaning: Christy's facial expression that Tammy tries to use on Jill to persuade her for a loan and the comment Bonnie makes to Wendy about the latter's gas-station hot dog.

== Ratings ==
Viewership and ratings per episode of Mom season 7
No.	Title	Air date	Rating/share (18–49)	Viewers (millions)	DVR (18–49)	DVR viewers (millions)	Total (18–49)	Total viewers (millions)
1	"Audrey Hepburn and a Jalapeño Popper"	September 26, 2019	0.8/4	6.25	0.6	2.37	1.4	8.62
2	"Pop Pop and a Puma"	October 3, 2019	0.8/4	6.28	0.5	2.32	1.3	8.60
3	"Goat Yogurt and Ample Parking"	October 10, 2019	0.8/4	5.78	0.5	2.20	1.3	7.98
4	"Twirly Flippy Men and a Dirty Bird"	October 17, 2019	0.8/4	5.81	0.5	2.14	1.3	7.95
5	"Fake Bacon and a Plan to Kill All of Us"	October 24, 2019	0.8/4	6.34	0.5	2.18	1.3	8.52
6	"Wile E. Coyote and a Possessed Doll"	November 7, 2019	0.8/4	6.20	0.5	2.29	1.3	8.49
7	"Pork Butt and a Mall Walker"	November 14, 2019	0.9/4	6.28	0.5	2.28	1.4	8.56
8	"Hot Butter and Toxic Narcissism"	November 21, 2019	0.8/4	6.06	0.4	2.02	1.2	8.08
9	"Tuna Florentine and a Clean Handoff"	December 5, 2019	0.8/4	6.07	0.5	2.11	1.3	8.18
10	"Higgledy-Piggledy and a Cat Show"	December 12, 2019	0.7/4	6.25	0.5	2.12	1.2	8.37
11	"One Tiny Incision and a Coffin Dress"	January 9, 2020	0.8/4	5.99	0.5	2.33	1.3	8.32
12	"Silly Frills and a Depressed Garden Gnome"	January 16, 2020	0.7/4	6.30	0.4	2.31	1.1	8.61
13	"Dammit Sandra and Viking Ancestors"	January 30, 2020	0.7/4	6.08	0.5	2.39	1.2	8.47
14	"Blood Filtering and a Lucky Duck"	February 6, 2020	0.7	6.34	0.4	2.13	1.1	8.47
15	"Somebody's Grandmother and the A-List"	February 13, 2020	0.8	6.27	0.4	2.28	1.2	8.55
16	"Judy Garland and a Sexy Troll Doll"	February 20, 2020	0.7	6.28	0.4	2.24	1.1	8.52
17	"Beef Baloney Dan and the Hot Zone"	March 5, 2020	0.7	5.82	0.5	2.39	1.2	8.21
18	"A Judgy Face and Your Grandma's Drawers"	March 12, 2020	0.8	6.35	0.5	2.29	1.3	8.64
19	"Texas Pete and a Parking Lot Carnival"	April 2, 2020	1.0	7.62	0.4	2.22	1.4	9.84
20	"Big Sad Eyes and a Wrinkled Hot Dog"	April 16, 2020	0.8	7.14	0.4	2.28	1.2	9.42
