= Larry Joe Campbell =

American actor (born 1970)

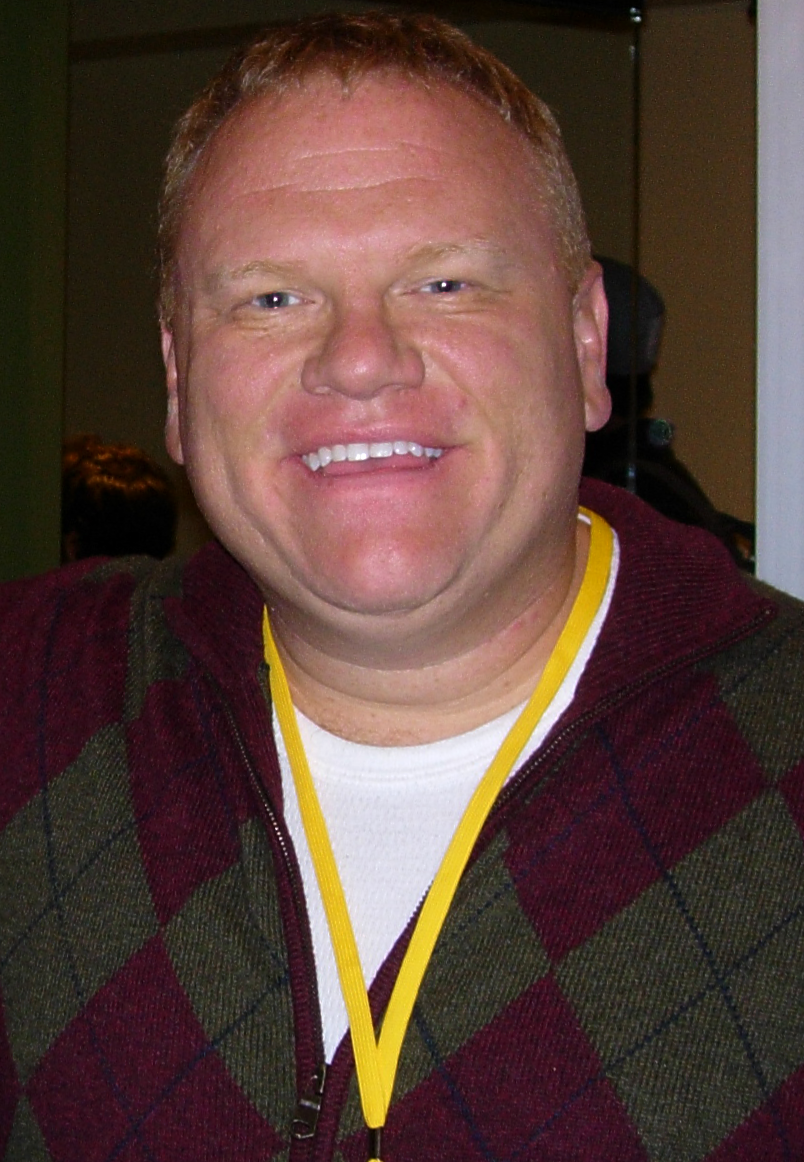
- Campbell in December 2009
- Born: November 29, 1970 (age 55)
- Occupation: Actor
- Years active: 1997–present
- Spouse: Peggy Campbell (m. 1997)
- Children: 5

Larry Joe Campbell (born November 29, 1970) is an American actor. He is best known for his role as Andy on the ABC sitcom According to Jim.

== Early life ==
Campbell graduated from high school at Pine River Area Schools and received a Bachelor of Applied Arts in theater at Central Michigan University and a Master of Arts in theater at Wayne State University. In 2005, Campbell returned to Central Michigan University to serve as the grand marshal of the homecoming parade.

== Career ==
His first high-profile TV guest star role was as "The Fan" in a February 2000 episode of Friends (season 6, episode 14); later that year, he was cast in the regular role of Stansfield in the short-lived sitcom The Trouble with Normal. The next year, he was cast as Andy on According to Jim. He has also appeared in movies including Wedding Crashers and Showtime, and in commercials including Ball Park hot dog commercials as "Frank," and a PSA for the V-chip on ABC, as Jim's Andy. In 2007, he appeared in two episodes of My Name Is Earl as Ron, a security prison guard. Campbell also played Detective Crockers in the 2007 horror film Drive-Thru. That same year, he made a guest appearance on Supernatural (episode: "Bedtime Stories").

Campbell had a small role on Showtime's Weeds. Larry also appeared as Pete Denham in the 2010 film Killers and as Vigs in Deadrise. Also, he appeared in the Disney Channel shows I Didn't Do It as Deputy Doug, Good Luck Charlie as Hugo, Dog with a Blog as "The Hawk", Best Friends Whenever as Mr. Doyle, and CBS' The New Adventures of Old Christine and Rules of Engagement. Campbell played the role of Hog Head in the 2011 film Hall Pass. He had a recurring role in the series The Protector. In 2013, he began touring with a group of comedians led by his Jim co-star Jim Belushi known as "Jim Belushi and the Board of Comedy".

In 2017, Campbell had a recurring role as Chief Engineer Newton in the first season of the Fox sci-fi TV series The Orville. At the end of that season, his character was written out. That same year, he had a recurring role as a step-father to a troubled high schooler in the Netflix documentary American Vandal, and appeared in an episode of the sitcom American Housewife. In 2019, he appeared as Officer Wilson in the HBO drama series Euphoria.

== Personal life and family ==
Campbell's wife, Peggy, teaches at the Rolling Hills Country Day School in Rolling Hills Estates, California. The couple have five children.

Campbell has coached high school football.

He published a novel Remember That One Time? in 2025.

== Filmography ==
=== Film ===
Year	Title	Role	Notes
1997	Get the Hell Out of Hamtown	Roomie	
2002	Showtime	Locker Room Cop #2	
2002	One Half Gone	Glenn	
2004	Jiminy Glick in Lalawood	Haygood Lewkin	
2005	Wedding Crashers	Best Man	
2006	Alleyball	Stencke	
2007	Drive-Thru	Detective Dwayne Crockers	
2007	The Eyes Have It	Moxie Lewis	Short
2007	Deeply Irresponsible	Don Atlin	
2008	Scooby-Doo and the Goblin King	Glum (voice)	Video
2008	Yoga Matt	Officer Strinske	Short
2009	The Law	Carl Tucker	TV movie
2010	Killers	Pete Denham	
2010	Welcome to the Jungle Gym	Mr. Shebesta	Short
2010	Piranhas	Leary	Short
2011	Hall Pass	Hog-Head	
2011	Carly Craig's Sexy Photoshoot for Maxim	-	Short
2011	Fitful	Vigs	
2012	Dogman	Hanklin Purvis	
2013	Merkin Penal	Lars	Short
2013	Pacific Rim	Construction Worker	
2013	R.I.P.D.	Officer Murphy	
2014	Teacher of the Year	Marv Collins	
2014	Dogman 2: The Wrath of the Litter	Hanklin	
2015	The Better Half	The Mayor	
2016	Fitful: The Lost Director's Cut	Vigs	
2017	A Change of Heart	Lou	
2017	Special Unit	Mike the Manager	
2025	Dogman 3: Fight to the Finish	Hanklin Purvis	

=== Television ===
Year	Title	Role	Notes
1999	Stark Raving Mad	Man in Elevator	Episode: "The Stalker"
2000	Friends	The Fan	Episode: "The One Where Chandler Can't Cry"
2000	Suddenly Susan	Gus	Episode: "The Bird in the Wall"
2000	The Trouble with Normal	Stansfield Schlick	Main Cast
2001	The Geena Davis Show	Dr. Liste	Episode: "Hot Potato"
2001	The Ellen Show	Randy	Episode: "Muskrat Love"
2001–2009	According to Jim	Andrew "Andy" Mabel	Main Cast
2002–2004	Pyramid	Himself/Celebrity Contestant	Recurring Guest
2005	TV Land's Top Ten	Himself	Episode: "Greatest TV Romances"
2005	I Love the '80s 3-D	Himself	Episode: "1987"
2007	My Name Is Earl	Prison Guard Ron	Episode: "The Gangs of Camden County" & "Early Release"
2009	Weeds	C.P. Jones	Recurring Cast: Season 5
2010	Good Luck Charlie	Hugo	Episode: "Charlie Did It!"
2011	CPA Holes	Kovach	Main Cast
2011	Rules of Engagement	Todd	Recurring Cast: Season 5
2011	The Protector	Detective Ted Buerge	Recurring Cast
2012–2015	Key and Peele	Various Roles	Recurring Guest
2013	Who Gets the Last Laugh?	Himself	Episode: "Nicole Sullivan/Kevin McDonald/Larry Joe Campbell"
2013	Dog with a Blog	The Hawk	Episode: "The Truck Stops Here" & "Avery's First Breakup"
2013	Last Man Standing	Phil Munroe	Episode: "Shoveling Snow"
2013	Kirstie	Clown	Episode: "Arlo's Birthday"
2014	I Didn't Do It	Doug Peterman	Episode: "The Pilot" & "Phone Challenge"
2015	The Goldbergs	Paul	Episode: "The Lost Boy"
2015–2016	Best Friends Whenever	Mr. Doyle	Recurring Cast
2017	American Housewife	Ian	Episode: "Bag Lady"
2017	Detroiters	Chuck	Episode: "Husky Boys"
2017	American Vandal	Greg Kavanagh	Recurring Cast: Season 1
2017	The Mayor	Dick	Episode: "Pilot"
2017	The Orville	Steve Newton	Recurring Cast: Season 1
2018	Fuller House	Sudsy the Clown	Episode: "President Fuller"
2019	Teachers	Gary	Episode: "Thoughts and Bears"
2019	Euphoria	Officer Wilson	Episode: "'03 Bonnie and Clyde"
2019	Mom	Mike	Guest Cast: Season 6-7
2020	Carol's Second Act	Eddie Ryan	Recurring Cast
2020–2022	Space Force	Admiral Louis Biffoont	Recurring Cast: Season 1, Guest: Season 2
2020–2023	Growing Belushi	Himself	Guest: Season 1, Recurring Cast: Seasons 2-3
2021	Rutherford Falls	Kurt	Episode: "Terry Thomas"
2022	9-1-1: Lone Star	Al	Episode: "Impulse Control"
2023	Goosebumps	Park Ranger	Episode: "You Can't Scare Me"
2024–present	Animal Control	Carl	Recurring

== Sources ==
- Heidi Press, "Alumni Profile: According to Larry" Wayne State: The Magazine for Members of the WSU Alumni Association (Detroit) Fall 2006, p. 33
