= Charlie Finn =

American film and television actor (born 1975)

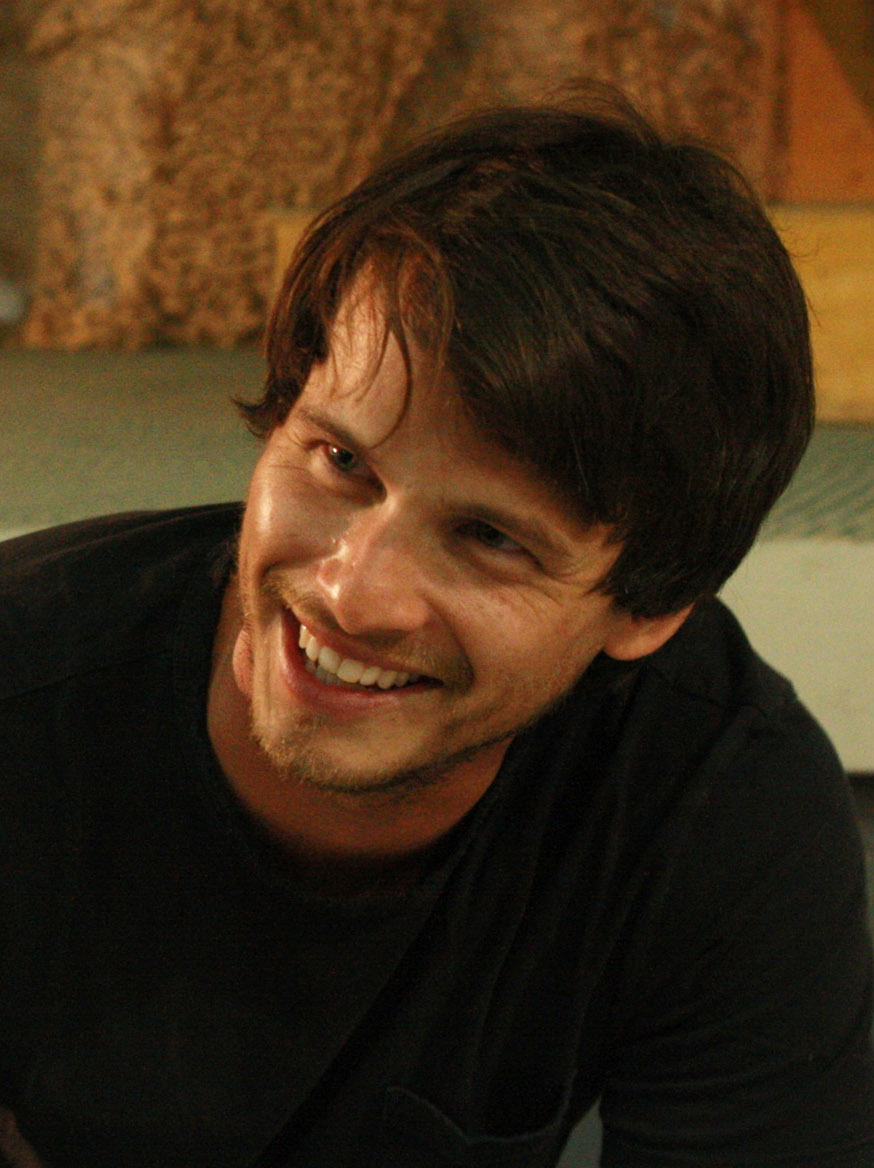
- Finn in 2009
- Born: September 18, 1975 (age 50); Milwaukee, Wisconsin, U.S.
- Occupation: Actor
- Years active: 1999–present

Charlie Finn (born September 18, 1975) is an American film, television, and voice actor. Finn is best known for his role as the voice of Spud in American Dragon: Jake Long.

== Early life and education ==
Finn was born in Milwaukee, Wisconsin, and raised in Lake Bluff, Illinois, where he attended Lake Forest High School. Finn majored in English at Southern Methodist University in Dallas, Texas, and was a member of the Texas Delta chapter of the Phi Delta Theta fraternity. He has been a member of the Lake Forest Players' Club since the early 1990s, and is well known for his recitals of epic Shakespearean soliloquies.

== Career ==
Finn is known for his voice role as Spud in the animated series American Dragon: Jake Long and for co-starring in the sitcoms Life on a Stick and Help Me Help You. He has also appeared in the films Gone But Not Forgotten, Psycho Beach Party, Rolling Kansas, The Dukes of Hazzard and played a small but memorable role as a smart-ass fast-food cashier in Super Troopers. He co-starred in the film Bar Starz in 2008. He provided additional voices in Happy Feet Two. Finn also portrayed Captain 'Black Jack' Bonfield in the "Chicago" episode of Derek Waters' Drunk History on Comedy Central. He also had a small role in an episode of Sports Night.

== Filmography ==
=== Film ===
Year	Title	Role	Notes
2000	The In Crowd	Greg	
2000	Psycho Beach Party	Pea Brain	
2001	Super Troopers	Dimpus Burger Guy	
2002	The Year That Trembled	Jim 'Hairball' Morton	
2002	King's Highway	Bruce	
2003	Rolling Kansas	Kevin Haub	
2005	The Dukes of Hazzard	Royce	
2008	Bar Starz	Douglas	
2011	Happy Feet Two	Additional voices	
2012	The Babymakers	Sperm Bank Receptionist	
2012	Struck by Lightning	Coach Colin Walker	
2020	Una Great Movie	Nate	Completed

=== Television ===
Year	Title	Role	Notes
1999	Sports Night	Corbin Davis	Episode: "Kyle Whitaker's Got Two Sacks"
2000	DAG	Steve	2 episodes
2002	The Wonderful World of Disney	Hank	Episode: "Nancy Drew"
2002	Deep Cover	Jackson Lewis	1 episode
2002–2003	Andy Richter Controls the Universe	Teak	3 episodes
2003	Judging Amy	Atty. Douglas Raine	Episode: "CSO Hartford"
2005	Gone But Not Forgotten	John	Television film
2005	Lilo & Stitch: The Series	Spud	Episode: "Morpholomew: Experiment 316"
2005	Love, Inc.	Charlie	Episode: "Three's Company"
2005	Life on a Stick	Fred	13 episodes
2005–2007	American Dragon: Jake Long	Spud / Teenage Worker	47 episodes
2006–2007	Help Me Help You	Dave	14 episodes
2008	Front of the Class	Ron	Television film
2009	Castle	Ian Yankman	Episodes: "Hedge Fund Homeboys"
2009	Pulling	Karl	Television film
2011	Franklin & Bash	Colin Morrow	Episode: "You Can't Take It with You"
2011	Danni Lowinski	Laz	Unsold pilot
2012	Middle Ages		Television film
2013, 2016	Drunk History	Mike Veeck / Cpt. 'Black Jack' Bonfield	2 episodes
2015	Little Things: The Thing About Weed	Hot Guy	Television short
2016	Lady Dynamite	Russell	Episode: "Enter Super Grisham"
