= Rolling Kansas =

2003 American comedy film

- DVD cover
- Directed by: Thomas Haden Church
- Written by: Thomas Haden Church; David Denney
- Produced by: Paul Brooks; Ed Cathell III; David Denney
- Starring: James Roday Rodriguez; Sam Huntington; Ryan McDow; Jay Paulson; Charlie Finn; Rip Torn
- Cinematography: Nathan Hope
- Edited by: Sandra Adair
- Music by: Anthony Marinelli
- Release date: January 24, 2003
- Running time: 89 minutes
- Country: United States
- Language: English

Rolling Kansas is a 2003 independent film directed by Thomas Haden Church, and written by Church and David Denney.

== Plot ==
5 men (a T-shirt salesman, his two brothers, a large narcoleptic nursing student, and a dim-witted gas station attendant) embark on a journey to find a secret government marijuana field in Kansas that was discovered on a map that three of the young men's parents left for them (known as the Hippies Murphy). On the way, they encounter cops, crazy geese, strippers, and a crazy old man played by Rip Torn.

== Cast ==
- James Roday Rodriguez as Dick Murphy
- Sam Huntington as Dinkadoo Murphy
- Jay Paulson as Dave Murphy
- Charlie Finn as Kevin Haub
- Ryan McDow as Hunter Bullette
- Rip Torn as Oldman
- Lisa Marie Newmyer as Satin
- Mia Zottoli as Cheyenne

== Production ==
The film was shot in Lockhart, Texas.

== Soundtrack album details ==
1. "Ride With Yourself" – Rhino Bucket
2. "Mindrocker" – Fenwyck
3. "Marseilles" – The Angels
4. "Beat to Death Like a Dog" – Rhino Bucket
5. "I Was Told" – Rhino Bucket
6. "Alabama Sky" – The Dusky Picks
7. "No Friend of Mine" – Rhino Bucket
8. "One Night Stand" – Rhino Bucket
9. "Ebony Eyes" – Bob Welch
10. "She Rides" – Rhino Bucket
11. "Train Ride" – Rhino Bucket
12. "Golden Ball and Chain" – Jason & the Scorchers
