= William F. Shipley =

American linguist (1921–2011)

- Shipley in 1990
- Born: November 19, 1921; Lawton, Oklahoma, U.S.
- Died: January 20, 2011 (aged 89)
- Spouse: Barbara Bartle (m. 1962; div. 1986)
- Partner: Jerry Davis
- Children: 2, including Michael Shipley

Academic background
- Education: UC Berkeley
- Thesis: Maidu Grammar (1959)
- Doctoral advisor: Mary Haas

Academic work
- Discipline: Linguist
- Institutions: UC Berkeley; UC Santa Cruz
- Notable students: Marc Okrand; Terrence Kaufman
- Main interests: Maidu language

William F. Shipley (November 19, 1921 – January 20, 2011) was an American linguist whose main area of research was the now-extinct Maidu language of Northern California. He was one of the last speakers of the language.

== Life ==
Shipley was a student of anthropologist and linguist Alfred Kroeber, and linguist Mary Haas at UC Berkeley. During World War II, he was part of a program to teach US Army soldiers to speak Mandarin Chinese at Berkeley.

Shipley began studying the Mountain Maidu language in 1953 with Maym Benner Gallagher, a Maidu elder. He continued to work with Kenneth Holbrook to continue to document and record the Maidu language. Their collaboration led to a book of Maidu texts and dictionary. as well as a grammar of Maidu.

Shipley taught as a professor of linguistics at UC Santa Cruz from 1966 to 1991. After his retirement, he continued to work in spreading knowledge about the Maidu language and culture. His book of translated Maidu stories, The Maidu Indian Myths and Stories of Hánc'ibyjim, was published by Heydey Books in 1991. He died of complications from pneumonia on January 20, 2011. He was the father of screenwriter Michael Shipley.
