= Help Me Help You (TV series) =

- Genre: Sitcom
- Created by: Jennifer Konner; Alexandra Rushfield
- Starring: Ted Danson; Jere Burns; Darlene Hunt; Charlie Finn; Suzy Nakamura; Jim Rash; Jane Kaczmarek
- Country of origin: United States
- Original language: English
- No. of seasons: 1
- No. of episodes: 13 (4 unaired)

Production
- Executive producers: Alex Reid; Jennifer Konner; Alexandra Rushfield
- Producers: Victor Hsu; Jimmy Simons
- Camera setup: Single-camera
- Production companies: Pointy Bird Productions; Tire Fire Productions; Regency Television; Fox Television Studios

Original release
- Network: ABC
- Release: September 26 – December 12, 2006

Help Me Help You is an American sitcom television series created by Jennifer Konner and Alexandra Rushfield that aired on ABC from September 26 to December 12, 2006. It was a comedy about a collection of eccentric individuals in group psychotherapy with a respected therapist, who may have more problems than his patients. The series was pulled from the schedule on December 14, 2006, and ABC canceled it after one season on May 15, 2007.

== Cast ==
=== Main ===
- Ted Danson as Dr. Bill Hoffman, a brilliant therapist with a huge ego and a failed marriage.
- Jere Burns as Michael, a high-powered executive with anger issues, in court-ordered therapy.
- Darlene Hunt as Darlene, a woman with constant need of approval, secretly in an affair with Michael but obsessed with Dr. Hoffman.
- Charlie Finn as Dave, a man who tried to kill himself in his office because no one likes him.
- Suzy Nakamura as Inger, a deeply lonely woman with a complete lack of social skills.
- Jim Rash as Jonathan, a married gay man in denial.
- Jane Kaczmarek as Anne Hoffman, Bill's estranged wife. (6 episodes)

=== Recurring ===
- Jane Lynch as Raquel Janes, a therapist, part of Dr. Hoffman's "therapy for therapists" group.
- Philip Rosenthal as Phil, a therapist, part of the "therapy for therapists" group.
- Judd Apatow as Judd, a therapist, part of the "therapy for therapists" group.
- Larry Wilmore as Larry, a therapist, part of the "therapy for therapists" group.
- Lindsay Sloane as Sasha, Bill's daughter with deep-rooted daddy issues.
- Brenda Strong as Linda, Dr. Hoffman's new neighbor and romantic interest.
- Thomas F. Wilson as Kenny, a car salesman and Anne's new boyfriend.
- Meredith Roberts as Francesca, the girl at work Dave is in love with.
- Kathleen Rose Perkins as Jocelyn, Jonathan's Wife.
- Bruce Altman as Ira, Sasha's much, bada boyfriend and a huge fan of Dr. Bill Hoffman's.
- Mykel Shannon Jenkins as Shannon, a coffee barista Jonathan seems to find attractive.
- Tim Meadows as Petey, a colleague of Dr. Hoffman's who he shares a practice with.
- Toby Huss as Lenny, a patient of Petey's.
- Michael Cotter as Glen, a young man Inger meets on JDate and whom she becomes obsessed over.

=== Notable guests ===
- Kevin Hart as Kevin, a boxer who has trouble finding the anger to fight (episode "Raging Bill").
- Seth Rogen as Seth (episode "Working Women").

== Episodes ==
No.	Title	Directed by	Written by	Original release date	Prod. code
1	"Pilot"	Brian Dannelly	Jennifer Konner & Alexandra Rushfield	September 26, 2006	10097-06-179
2	"The Mattress"	Peter Lauer	Alex Reid	October 3, 2006	16-06-101
3	"Fun Run"	Peter Lauer	Rodney Rothman	October 10, 2006	16-06-103
4	"Pink Freud"	Jason Ensler	Ron Weiner	October 17, 2006	16-06-104
5	"Sasha's Birthday BBQ"	Jason Ensler	Jennifer Konner & Alexandra Rushfield	October 24, 2006	16-06-102
6	"Inger Management"	Peter Lauer	Daley Haggar	October 31, 2006	16-06-105
7	"Raging Bill"	Bryan Gordon	Chester Tam	November 28, 2006	16-06-106
8	"Perverse Psychology"	Victor Nelli, Jr.	Joel Madison	December 5, 2006	16-06-107
9	"Perseverance"	David Steinberg	Craig DiGregorio	December 12, 2006	16-06-108
10	"The Sheriff"	Matthew Diamond	Rodney Rothman	Unaired	16-06-109
11	"Working Women"	Linwood Boomer	Ron Weiner	Unaired	16-06-110
12	"Boxer"	Linwood Boomer	Linda Wallem	Unaired	16-06-111
13	"Moving On"	Linda Mendoza	Jennifer Konner & Alexandra Rushfield	Unaired	16-06-112

== Production ==
Ted Danson signed on to star in the pilot for Help Me Help You in late February 2006. ABC greenlit it to series on May 10, 2006, for the 2006–07 television season. After its premiere, ABC ordered extra scripts of the series in late October 2006, but it was pulled from the schedule on December 14, 2006, and additional episodes were never produced. The series was cancelled by ABC on May 15, 2007.

== Broadcast ==
The series was first broadcast on ABC on September 26, 2006, at 9:30pm Tuesdays in the United States. It aired on Global in Canada.
