= Irene Molloy =

American actress, singer and songwriter

- Born: Pennsylvania, United States
- Occupations: Singer; actress
- Years active: 1996–present
- Musical career
- Genres: Folk; country; acoustic; pop
- Instruments: Vocals; guitar
- Label: Femme Pop
- Website: irenemolloy.com

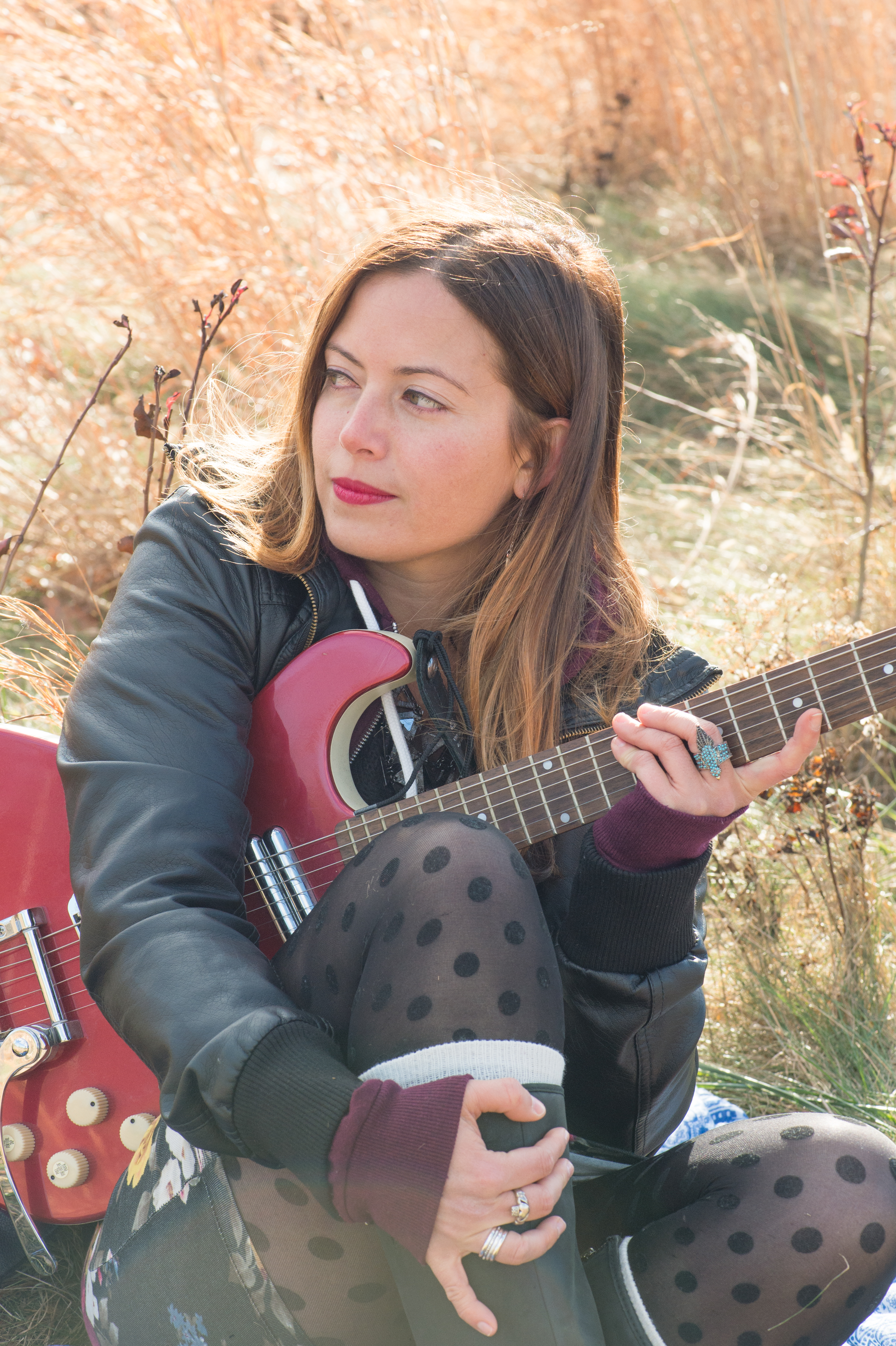

Irene Molloy is an American actress, singer, and songwriter. She is best known for her roles on television series Andy Richter Controls the Universe and Grosse Pointe. She has also appeared in Broadway and Off-Broadway musicals, television series and movies.

== Formative years ==
Born near Philadelphia, Irene Molloy is a daughter of Edward Molloy, a computer analyst for Amtrak, and Linda Molloy, a hospital neonatal nurse. She resided with her family in Chalfont, Pennsylvania during the 1990s, and was cast in a lead role in the 1996 Andrew Lloyd Webber musical, Whistle Down the Wind while still a senior at Archbishop Wood Catholic High School in Warminster. She had been performing with the Rainbow Connection in Philadelphia during this same period of her life. After graduating from Archbishop Wood in June 1996, she relocated to New York City.

== Career ==
A member of the Broadway cast of The Civil War, she received an Outer Critics Circle Awards nomination for outstanding featured actress for her performance in that role. In 1999, she sang Phantom of the Opera's "Remember Me" at an event honoring director Harold Prince. After relocating to Hollywood, California, she was cast in the film, Story of a Bad Boy.

Between 2000 and 2004, she starred in two comedy series. The first was as Hunter Fallow/Becky Johnson in Grosse Pointe which ran between 2000 and 2001. After the show ended, she gained a role as main character Wendy McKay in the TV series Andy Richter Controls the Universe, which aired for two seasons from 2002 to 2004.

After moving back to Philadelphia, she focused on writing music.

In 2026 Molloy returned to the stage with her self-produced one-woman show, Show Pony, which premiered at the Pittsburgh Fringe Festival.

=== Theatre ===
Year	Title	Role	Notes
1996	Whistle Down the Wind	Swallow	Debut stage role
1999	The Civil War	Sarah McEwen	
1999	Romeo & Juliet	Juliet	
2007	10 Million Miles	Molly	
2026	Show Pony	Self	Self-produced, one-woman show

=== Awards ===
- Helen Hayes Award (recipient)
- Outer Critics Circle Awards (outstanding featured actress nominee)
