= Santa Clarita Diet =

2017 American comedy horror television series

- Genre: Comedy horror
- Created by: Victor Fresco
- Starring: Drew Barrymore; Timothy Olyphant; Liv Hewson; Skyler Gisondo
- Composers: John Debney; Josh Debney; Jeff Russo
- Country of origin: United States
- Original language: English
- No. of seasons: 3
- No. of episodes: 30

Production
- Executive producers: Victor Fresco; Tracy Katsky; Aaron Kaplan; Drew Barrymore; Chris Miller; Ember Truesdell; Timothy Olyphant; Andy Weil; Jane Wiseman; Brittney Segal; Ruben Fleischer
- Producers: Leila Cohan-Miccio; Nancy Juvonen; Jimmy Simons
- Cinematography: Todd McMullen; Paul Maibaum
- Editors: Shawn Paperwork; Andrew Down; Lawrence Minkey; Steven Spread
- Camera setup: Single-camera
- Running time: 26–36 minutes
- Production companies: Kapital Entertainment; KatCo; Flower Films; Garfield Grove; Olybomb Productions

Original release
- Network: Netflix
- Release: February 3, 2017 – March 29, 2019

Santa Clarita Diet is an American comedy horror television series created by Victor Fresco for the streaming service Netflix, starring Drew Barrymore and Timothy Olyphant. Fresco serves as the showrunner, and is an executive producer alongside Barrymore, Olyphant, Aaron Kaplan, Tracy Katsky, Chris Miller, Ember Truesdell and Ruben Fleischer. The series centers on husband and wife real estate team Joel and Sheila Hammond whose normal, mundane lives change dramatically when Sheila shows symptoms of having become a zombie. The bewildered family seeks a cure for her condition while dealing with its consequences, such as Sheila's new craving of human flesh and radically altered personality that has become more primal and impulsive.

The single-camera series premiered on February 3, 2017. The first season, consisting of 10 episodes, received generally positive reviews. On March 29, 2017, it was announced that Netflix renewed the series for a second season, which premiered on March 23, 2018. On May 8, 2018, the series was renewed for a 10-episode third season and premiered on March 29, 2019. The series was canceled after three seasons on April 26, 2019.

== Plot ==
Joel and Sheila Hammond are everyday suburban real estate agents in Santa Clarita, California. The couple face a series of obstacles when Sheila undergoes a metamorphosis, becomes undead and starts craving human flesh. As Joel and the family try to help Sheila through this, they have to deal with neighbors and cultural norms, and get to the bottom of a potentially mythological mystery.

== Cast ==
=== Main ===
- Drew Barrymore as Sheila Hammond, Joel's wife and Abby's mother.
- Timothy Olyphant as Joel Hammond, Sheila's husband and Abby's father.
- Liv Hewson as Abby Hammond, Sheila and Joel's daughter.
- Skyler Gisondo as Eric Bemis, the Hammonds' neighbor, Lisa's son and Dan's stepson.

=== Recurring ===
- Ricardo Chavira as Dan Palmer (season 1), a sheriff's deputy, the Hammonds' neighbor, and Eric's stepfather who is killed by Joel with a shovel and later eaten by Sheila.
- Mary Elizabeth Ellis as Lisa Palmer, Dan's wife, Eric's mother, and Sheila's friend.
- Andy Richter as Carl Coby, the Hammonds' obnoxious boss.
- Richard T. Jones as Rick, a Santa Monica police officer, the Hammonds' neighbor, and Joel's friend.
- Joy Osmanski as Alondra, Rick's wife and Sheila's friend.
- Kaylee Bryant as Sarah, a classmate of Abby and Eric's.
- Nathan Fillion (seasons 1–2) and Alan Tudyk (season 3) as Gary West, a realtor and the Hammonds' co-worker. He is the first person Sheila kills and eats who later turns into a zombie, though only his decayed, severed head remains and is kept by the Hammonds out of guilt.
- Natalie Morales as Anne Garcia, a religious sheriff's deputy and Dan's partner who becomes romantically involved with Lisa after Dan goes missing.
- Thomas Lennon as Andrei Novak, the principal of Santa Clarita High School.
- Ramona Young as Ramona, a wise Rite-Aid employee who turns out to be a zombie.
- Sydney Park as Winter, a classmate of Abby and Eric's who is in environmental club with them.
- Grace Zabriskie as Mrs. Bakavić (season 1), Novak's Serbian grandmother.
- DeObia Oparei as Loki Hayes (season 1), a convicted felon. He turns into a zombie when Sheila is unsuccessful in killing him.
- Jonathan Slavin as Ron, an asylum inmate, who was later released and who Joel told his little secret to in season 2. Ron later becomes a zombie in season 3, by forcing Gary to bite him.
- Joel McHale as Chris, a realtor who is married to Christa
- Maggie Lawson as Christa, a realtor who is married to Chris
- Zachary Knighton as Paul (seasons 2–3), Marsha's husband and a descendant of the Knights of Serbia, who has been tasked with ending the zombie outbreak
- Jee Young Han as Marsha (season 2), Paul's wife, who is helping him with the mission to end the zombie outbreak
- Ethan Suplee as Tommy (season 3), Paul's brother, former Marine Corps sniper, crossbow enthusiast and a descendant of the Knights of Serbia, who has taken over his brother's mission
- Shalita Grant as FBI Agent Tess Rogers (season 3), an agent investigating the bombing of the fracking site
- Matt Shively as Christian (seasons 2–3), a student at Abby and Eric's school who is also Chris and Christa's son
- Linda Lavin as Jean (season 3), a woman Sheila delivers Meals on Wheels to and is later turned into a zombie by Sheila.
- Goran Višnjić as Dobrivoje Poplović (season 3), a man who works in Serbia who is transferred to Santa Clarita

=== Guest ===
- Portia de Rossi as Dr. Cora Wolf, a scientist focused on the undead
- Markie Post as Becky, a client of the Hammonds'
- Patton Oswalt as Dr. Hasmedi, a virologist
- Ryan Hansen as Bob Jonas, Lisa Palmer's lover
- Derek Waters as Anton, a conspiracy theorist
- Ravi Patel as Ryan, a convention goer
- Gerald McRaney as Ed Thune, a retired army colonel
- Leo Howard as Sven, a classmate of Abby and Eric's who goes on a date with Abby
- Miraj Grbić as Vlado
- Kerri Kenney-Silver as Petra Blazic (season 3), Grand Prior of the Knights of Serbia

== Episodes ==
=== Series overview ===
Season	Episodes	Originally released
1	10	February 3, 2017
2	10	March 23, 2018
3	10	March 29, 2019

=== Season 1 (2017) ===
No. overall	No. in season	Title	Directed by	Written by	Original release date
1	1	"So Then a Bat or a Monkey"	Ruben Fleischer	Victor Fresco	February 3, 2017
Joel and Sheila Hammond are real estate agents leading a normal suburban life with their daughter Abby. They are trying hard to sell a house but while showing it Sheila throws up extensively, including what might be an organ. Joel takes Sheila to the emergency department but since it is slow they go home. Sheila is acting oddly, including an increased libido and a lack of heartbeat. Their neighbor's son Eric explains to them that Sheila is dead, undead and driven by her Id, which Sheila is okay with. Eric tells them Sheila must always be fed, and if she degrades she may have to die. Sheila parties with her neighbors. Gary, Sheila's co-worker, entices Sheila to dance with him when Joel finds them. They leave, and Sheila thinks her new behavior might be who she really is. At Sheila's home, Gary tries to rape her, threatening to tell others she was unfaithful if she refuses. Sheila licks his fingers, suddenly biting two of them off before devouring Gary in the backyard. Joel comes home to find Sheila eating Gary; as he looks on in horror, Sheila tells him she wants to make this work.
2	2	"We Can't Kill People!"	Ruben Fleischer	Victor Fresco	February 3, 2017
They bury Gary's remains in the desert. Abby and Eric follow them discovering Sheila killed Gary. While covering up the murder Dan sees Joel spraying his grass in the middle of the night and gets suspicious. Joel consults a virologist but he thinks Joel is crazy. Dan comes to inspect the grass and Joel tells him they have ants. Abby ditches school with Eric. Joel tries to get Sheila to eat meat but she says since she ate Gary she does not want anything but humans. Joel suggests that maybe it is the freshness that matters. Sheila continues to act impulsively including killing a rooster. After they make the sale on the listing Sheila tells Joel she could not eat the rooster. Joel reiterates that they cannot kill people. Joel and Sheila try to find an alternate food source at the morgue but Sheila cannot stand the cadaver flesh. Sheila's hunger is growing so Joel tells her they are going to kill people so she can eat. They have been together since high school and he is not going to leave her now. Abby comes and sleeps in their bed because she is worried about the changes.
3	3	"We Can Kill People"	Marc Buckland	Clay Graham	February 3, 2017
Joel and Sheila discuss balancing killing people and being parents. Abby is grumpy with them for being overbearing. They make a plan to find a bad person to kill. Eric and Abby have lunch while ditching school where Abby's friend leaves with her 26-year-old drug dealer boyfriend, but he breaks up with her. Joel and Sheila talk to Rick, their other neighbor who is a cop, looking for where to find people to kill. He says that a pedophile lives in the area and the couple consider killing him. Sheila and Joel overhear the teenagers talking about how bad the ex-boyfriend was and decide to kill him. Once Joel talked to him he decides to let him go much to Sheila's annoyance. The teenagers go to the ex-boyfriend's house; Abby throws a tear gas canister in and retrieves her friend's sweater. On the way home, Sheila and Joel have a road rage incident then Sheila kills the driver of the other car. They put him in the freezer in their storage unit hoping he will not be missed. They go to family dinner and all three of them tell the others how wonderful everything is.
4	4	"The Farting Sex Tourist"	Ken Kwapis	Michael A. Ross	February 3, 2017
Sheila makes a smoothie from the body in storage then goes walking with her neighbors. She suggests the women should live life to the fullest. She tells them her new attitude is due to her new high-protein diet. Joel goes to paranormal stores researching zombies. He finds two prints from Serbia that show someone vomiting up a red ball and then eating someone. Rick talks to the couple about their new car and then Dan interrupts bringing them more ant spray. Abby's school calls them in and Principal Novak tells them Abby is missing school. They insist everything is normal. Sheila gets upset with Novak and she wants to eat him when he threatens to suspend Abby. Sheila tells Abby she should drop out causing Joel to confront Sheila about her behavior concluding he is not sure their family can survive it. Sheila talks to Eric who tells her the undead have no impulse control and she cannot change. Meanwhile, Joel talks to Abby and they steal Rick's motorcycle before they bond over freaking out about Sheila. Joel realizes Novak is Serbian. Dan sprays Joel's yard for ants and finds Gary's finger.
5	5	"Man Eat Man"	Marc Buckland	Chadd Gindin	February 3, 2017
Abby goes to the storage unit and finds the dead man in the freezer. Joel talks to Novak's Grandmother for help translating the prints. She tells him it is an old story about zombies from a book that might have a cure. Sheila is reluctant about a cure at first as she likes the side effects of being a zombie but finally agrees she wants a cure. Joel finds a possible source for the book, Anton. Abby tells Eric about the dead guy she found. Eric tells Abby he found out his mom is having an affair. Joel asks Rick to run a check for Anton. Dan blackmails Joel into killing a guy named Loki. Joel tells Sheila that Dan knows about Gary. Sheila wants to kill Loki for food and is willing to go alone. Abby complains to Eric about her parents' lying and he tries to kiss her. Sheila and Joel try to kill Loki and fail. Sheila is worried she bit Loki. Abby notices blood on Sheila's briefcase but does not confront her mom about it. Loki is on the floor of a hotel room surrounded by vomit like Sheila was before.
6	6	"Attention to Detail"	Craig Zisk	Leila Cohan-Miccio	February 3, 2017
Joel and Sheila stake out Loki and debate the possibility that he was turned into a zombie. With no resolution they go to a party at Dan's house and Joel has to lie to Dan about Loki. Sheila realizes she left a pen with her contact information at Loki's house. Abby and Eric have a hard time recovering from the kiss. Dan wants Joel to kill another guy who he claims is a bad guy but when Sheila goes to kill him it turns out to be the guy Lisa is having an affair with and she does not kill him. Abby and Eric find a stash of drugs and money, concluding Dan is a dirty cop. They then decide to plant a flash bang in his rose garden to freak him out. Joel runs into Loki's friends and is held hostage. They knock him out but he is OK and he finds the pen. Joel and Sheila decide they are going to do everything together moving forward. Joel confronts Dan telling him he will not be killing people for him anymore. They get into a fight and Joel kills him with a shovel.
7	7	"Strange or Just Inconsiderate?"	Lynn Shelton	Ben Smith	February 3, 2017
Joel and Sheila bring Dan's body to their house and they make a plan to dispose of him. Sheila begins to worry about Joel, who is obsessed with retaining the family's "normality." Rick finds Anton for Joel. Abby finds Dan's body in the tub and confronts her parents about lying to her. Abby tells Eric that Dan is dead and he is fine with it. Abby and Eric have a plan to help cover up Dan's murder by revealing he is a dirty cop to the other cops. With the sheriff's department all over the neighborhood following Dan's disappearance, Sheila undertakes to eat him completely to hide the evidence but fails. Joel decides to take the remaining body parts out of the house in a cooler. The cops find Dan's stash and with it Gary's finger. Rick tells Joel that Gary's disappearance is being blamed on Dan. While Sheila is taking a bath her little toe falls off.
8	8	"How Much Vomit?"	Steve Pink	Aaron Brownstein & Simon Ganz	February 3, 2017
Sheila hides the fact that her toe has fallen off from Joel. As the police discover more about Dan's corrupt activities, Joel and Sheila hear that Loki is still alive and appears to have turned undead as well. They find him doing an acoustic performance at a local club, and he becomes obsessed with Sheila, forcing them to kill him when he tries to murder Joel. As Joel is coming to terms with Sheila's toe having fallen off, they are both shocked to notice that her right eye is now hanging out of her head.
9	9	"The Book!"	Tamra Davis	Sarah Walker	February 3, 2017
Joel and Eric head to a paranormal convention to meet Anton, a popular and mysterious figure in the paranormal community, who claims to have an ancient book containing the cure for Sheila's condition. Anton accuses Joel of being a government agent, and when confronted later, admits he is a fraud and does not have the book; however, Joel is approached by another attendee, who puts him in touch with the book's real owner, Dr. Cora Wolf. Meanwhile, Sheila bonds with Abby, as the two try to get her money back from the brother of the deceased chop shop owner.
10	10	"Baka, Bile and Baseball Bats"	Dean Parisot	Clay Graham	February 3, 2017
Dr. Cora Wolf moves in with the Hammonds to work on a cure for the virus; explaining that Sheila is dead, and the "cure" will only halt her condition's progress or else she will become uncontrollably violent and harm her family. Wolf synthesizes the cure, only requiring the final ingredient: the bile of a full-blooded Serbian. Joel and Sheila visit Principal Novak's "baka" and attempt to get her to vomit by getting her drunk; however, Novak calls the police and Joel is arrested and committed to a mental institution. Sheila gets Abby to chain her up in the basement, to prevent her from harming anyone. She takes a call from a real estate client, telling them that she hopes either she or her husband will be free next week.

=== Season 2 (2018) ===
No. overall	No. in season	Title	Directed by	Written by	Original release date
11	1	"No Family is Perfect"	Ken Kwapis	Victor Fresco	March 23, 2018
Joel is under a 72-hour hold at the mental institution and confides in his roommate Ron, who suffers from apparent delusions. Sheila is chained up in the basement as Abby and Eric search the internet for a pure Serbian who will sell their bile. They get a hit and Abby goes to collect. Joel is released from the institution and buys bile from the morgue. Sheila gets Eric to unchain her. Goran, the bile seller, is extremely forward with Abby and even follows her home. Sheila attacks and consumes him. Eric uses the man's bile to render a cure for Sheila's deterioration. Joel comes home horrified, but Eric assures the Hammonds that Sheila will not get any worse. Joel proposes that Sheila stay in the basement until she can control herself. Eric goes to buy cleaning supplies, where he meets deadpan store employee Ramona. Joel and Abby decide to stay the night with Sheila in the basement. Later on, Ramona calls Eric and asks if Abby is his girlfriend, adding that she is recently single. While eating a man's finger from her fridge, she asks Eric if he would like to hang out sometime.
12	2	"Coyote in Yoga Pants"	Marc Buckland	Michael A. Ross	March 23, 2018
Sheila begins chasing animals to curb her antsy behavior. Joel and Sheila run into their neighbor Lisa, who has no news on her "missing" husband Dan and has since started seeing his partner, Deputy Anne Garcia. Abby and Eric realize that their emails to Goran could trace his disappearance back to them. Sheila and Joel convince their boss Carl to give them one of Gary's old assignments. Abby and Eric break into Goran's apartment to delete the evidence. Abby tells Eric how scared she was when Goran followed her home, but Eric's phone keeps blowing up with texts from Ramona. Another couple enters the apartment, also claiming to be Goran's friends. Abby and Eric leave, but the other couple knows about the bile. Sheila and Joel compete with their high school rivals, Chris and Christa, for a listing and prevail when Sheila is able to run down the owner's fleeing dog. Abby reluctantly encourages Eric to ask Ramona out. Sheila and Joel discover that the spot where they buried her first kill, Gary, is planned for development. They go to the desert to dig him up, but discover that Gary's severed head has reanimated.
13	3	"Moral Gray Area"	Ken Kwapis	Clay Graham	March 23, 2018
Sheila and Joel decide they need to kill the zombified Gary. Gary agrees, but asks them to bring the deed to his Michigan lake house to his niece Kayla. Sheila and Joel decide to honor Gary's last request. Eric finds a corpse in Ramona's bathtub and calls Abby, who sets out to rescue him. Sheila and Joel bring the deed to Kayla, but she still needs her car, which is with her ex-boyfriend, Boone. Sheila volunteers herself and Joel to retrieve the car. Abby bursts into Ramona's apartment but realizes that Eric and Ramona actually had sex. Ramona discloses that she is also deteriorating and Eric offers to help her. At Boone's house, Sheila and Joel discover that he is the "young, single Hitler" type that Sheila can eat guilt-free. While debating whether they should kill again impulsively, Boone's friend AJ shows up and offers them a raffle book for the Nazi softball team. Sheila buys one as a future kill reference. After Eric gives Ramona the serum to halt her deterioration, she admits that she was just using him for his ties to Abby's mother and they break up. Abby discovers Gary in the basement.
14	4	"The Queen of England"	Adam Arkin	Chadd Gindin	March 23, 2018
Gary decides he does not want to die, leaving the Hammonds in a bind. Abby tells her parents that Ramona is undead. Sheila and Joel go to her and realize that becoming undead makes people who they always wanted to be. Remembering reports of murdered joggers, Sheila tells Ramona that without "a Joel" to help her, she needs to be more careful. Ramona shows them that the ball she threw up during metamorphosis has sprouted legs. Abby stands up for a classmate by hitting another student, Christian, with a lunch tray. Ramona threatens Eric into being her Joel. Joel feels uneasy about his new life, but Gary offers some perspective. Ramona and Eric go to the Hammonds' dinner party and a fight ensues to free him. Abby chokes Ramona, who then confesses that she does not want to be undead alone anymore. Lisa walks in and the Hammonds reschedule dinner. Ramona decides to move to Seattle and Sheila and Joel go to her apartment for the ball creature. While there, Joel discovers a receipt showing that Ramona went to the restaurant Japopo's on the same day and ordered the same clam dish Sheila did before their metamorphoses.
15	5	"Going Pre-med"	Marc Buckland	Ben Smith	March 23, 2018
Sheila stakes out Boone's house while Joel goes undercover at Japopo's, but Joel is recognized for writing a negative Yelp review. The proprietor agrees to give Joel their receipts if he writes a positive review. Sheila accidentally convinces Anne to investigate the recent murders herself and Joel encourages Sheila to end their friendship. Sheila and Joel voice concern for Abby before renting a second storage unit; one for Gary and the ball creature, and the other for a kill room. Ron finds Joel and Sheila at work and Joel persuades him to keep their secret. Principal Novak nearly gives Abby a month's detention but with Eric's intervention, she instead joins the Environmental Club. Abby meets a new boy, Sven. Sheila and Joel lure Boone to their storage unit. She kills him as well as his fellow Nazi friend. Abby ditches the Environmental Club for something more extreme, with Eric's support. Joel vents to Gary and writes a new review for Japopo's. At the restaurant, Ron meets the couple from Goran's apartment, Marsha and Paul. They are looking for Serbian bile and information on the Hammonds. The man sports a ball creature tattoo on his arm.
16	6	"Pasión"	Steve Pink	Aaron Brownstein & Simon Ganz	March 23, 2018
Abby and Joel find another person from the Japopo's receipts who ordered the clam dish. Joel goes to stake out Colonel Ed Thune's house while Sheila attends a work meeting. To be consistent with a previous lie, Joel agrees to give Anne dance lessons. Abby tells Eric she has a date with Sven. Sheila's eye pops out at the meeting with Carl due to the frustration of not killing him. Joel goes to Ed's house undercover to confirm that Japopo's clams are the cause of the undead epidemic. Eric helps Sheila with her eye. Abby goes on a date with Sven but they do not connect. Joel questions Ed and searches his things. Sheila and Carl attend a meeting with an investor, who hates Carl's idea, prompting Sheila to offer her own. Carl berates Sheila, who accidentally bites off her own finger. The skin of Ed's hand slides off during a handshake, proving that he is undead. Joel kills Ed, who had already gone feral, as well as his ball creature. Abby tells Eric about her extreme plan to stop local fracking. Joel comes home to find Anne, but gets her to leave. Sheila shows Joel her mangled finger.
17	7	"A Change of Heart"	Jaffar Mahmood	Melissa Hunter	March 23, 2018
Eric helps Sheila reattach her finger and lets it slip about the tray incident. Sheila and Joel confront Abby, but she feels no remorse. Eric goes undercover at Japopo's but the owner will not disclose his clam distributor. Out of concern, Sheila and Joel force Abby to apologize to Christian only to discover that his parents are Chris and Christa, who try to blackmail the Hammonds with threats of Abby's expulsion. Eric breaks into Japopo's back office. The Hammonds go to Principal Novak's house where Sheila and Joel tell Abby how difficult it has been juggling all their problems and ask Abby to help them out. Abby apologizes to Novak but gets expelled anyway. He accidentally slams Sheila's finger in his door and she pretends to be hurt, forcing Novak to un-expel Abby. Eric calls Joel to show him that Japopo's used a different clam distributor, Ruby's Clams, the day that the Hammonds ate there before Sheila's metamorphosis. Sheila pulls into the parking lot for an investor meeting but Carl shows up unexpectedly. She closes her eyes and wakes up 12 hours later at home with blood on her face and a heart in her hand.
18	8	"Easels and War Paint"	Steve Pink	Caitlin Meares	March 23, 2018
Sheila cannot recall anything since the parking lot and is missing a boot. She and Joel suspect she killed Carl until Carl shows up to work and fires Sheila for missing the meeting. Lisa stops by the Hammonds' house to thank Sheila for convincing her to get baptized for Anne. During her blackout, Sheila also convinced Anne to focus on painting rather than the murder investigations. Abby finds AJ, the Nazi who sold Sheila the raffle book, dead in their freezer. Sheila and Joel go to AJ's work to retrieve her missing boot. Abby and Eric make plans to vandalize a fracking site. Abby asks Lisa for Dan's night vision goggles and Lisa agrees to lend them to her if Abby agrees to a makeover before her "date" with Eric. Sheila and Joel delete the security videos and retrieve Sheila's boot. Abby tells Eric she wants to use Dan's explosives, but Eric backs out of the plan. Joel quits his job and he and Sheila decide to establish their own real estate company. Anne's "Suspicious Objects" series includes paintings of Gary's finger, the Nazi raffle book, Dan's missing persons poster, and Joel.
19	9	"Suspicious Objects"	Jamie Babbit	Romi Barta	March 23, 2018
Joel goes undercover to scout Ruby's Clams and meets the proprietor. Anne shows Sheila her paintings. Abby is upset with Eric for bailing on their plans. Ruby shows Joel her clam farm, which has grown from 4 clams found in a deep aquatic cave in Serbia to 5,000 in a matter of months. She informs Joel that the clams are to be shipped out to restaurants the next day. As Sheila alerts Joel about the paintings, Marsha and Paul arrive at Ruby's. Anne explains to Sheila and Joel that she was simply painting suspicious objects, including a tumbler containing Goran's bile. She has pieced together parts of the case, but her boss did not buy her theories. Eric attempts to kill a red clam that Joel stole from Ruby's, but nothing works. The clam extends a tentacle to a regular clam and consumes it. Abby and Eric get Sven to give them access to a kiln so they can incinerate the clams. Ruby catches Sheila and Joel stealing her clams before Marsha and Paul blow up the building. Anne makes the connection of Boone having dated Gary's niece and her boss becomes interested in the case.
20	10	"Halibut!"	Marc Buckland	Victor Fresco	March 23, 2018
Sheila and Joel plan to destroy Anne's case. Eric helps Abby construct an explosive for the fracking site. After numerous takes, Gary finally records a message to a burner phone that'll lead the police to believe that he and Dan are on the run. Gary then confirms that he is ready to die. Abby and Eric plant the burner phone containing the message in Dan's closet for Anne to find, where they also discover a C-4 to use it at the fracking site. At Lisa's baptism, Anne informs Sheila and Joel that she has someone looking into possible deleted messages. Not knowing that deleted messages could be salvaged, the Hammonds plan their escape. Abby goes to say goodbye to Eric and they kiss. Anne confirms that nothing could be recovered from the burner phone but eventually recognizes a sound on the voicemail to be Sheila's bracelets. Anne catches Sheila and Joel in the middle of Gary's funeral and they tell her the truth. Anne shoots Sheila, who is unharmed, and Joel shows her Gary. Reading Abby and Eric's explosion as a sign, Anne accepts Sheila as an instrument of God.

=== Season 3 (2019) ===
No. overall	No. in season	Title	Directed by	Written by	Original release date
21	1	"Wuffenloaf"	Marc Buckland	Victor Fresco	March 29, 2019
After the events of the previous episode, the Hammonds deal with the aftermath of Anne learning about Sheila being undead.
22	2	"Knighttime"	Ken Kwapis	Michael A. Ross	March 29, 2019
Eric accidentally starts a rumor that he and Abby are dating. Sheila and Joel meet a Knight of Serbia as Anne helps them out with Chris and Christa.
23	3	"We Let People Die Every Day"	Geeta V. Patel	Clay Graham	March 29, 2019
In Sheila's quest to get Anne to stop believing she is a miracle from god, she admits the truth to her. At the same time, the FBI want to question the environmental club about what happened at the fracking site. Joel and Sheila deal with Tommy believing Christa is undead. Sheila asks Joel to consider being a member of the undead.
24	4	"More of a Cat Person"	Andy Ackerman	Ben Smith	March 29, 2019
As they worry about speaking with the FBI, Ramona texts Eric, surprising him and Abby. Ramona returns for Mr. Ball-legs and apologizes to Eric. Sheila and Joel have their first open house with their new company which has Sheila helping a woman from Anne's church group. She then plots to eat the woman's ex-husband. Anne dumps Lisa. Eric speaks with the FBI and learns that they could connect him to the C4 used. As Eric speaks with the FBI, Abby goes to talk to Ramona and threatens her to leave town without Eric. Ramona is threatened by the motel manager and it results in Mr. Ball-legs eating the guy. Joel defrosts Sheila's Mr. Ball-legs instead of giving her an answer to him being a member of the undead. Tommy contacts them after finding their website of their business with plans to kill Sheila.
25	5	"Belle and Sebastian Protect the Head"	Marc Buckland	Melissa Hunter	March 29, 2019
Ron approaches Sheila and Joel about turning him into a member of the undead. Abby begins to ignore Eric who shows up freaking out about the C4. When trying to remove the excess C4, Eric learns that the key to the locked room is no longer where it had been. Sheila and Joel head to Tommy's and find his own kill room in the garage. When Tommy goes to try killing Sheila, his daughter shows up so they rush home. Sheila decides to volunteer for Meals on Wheels. As Eric looks into unlocking the room with a lock pick, the FBI agent shows up there to look in the closet. Lisa reveals that she figured out what Abby and Eric did. Joel and Sheila talk Tommy out of killing Sheila. Ron breaks in and gets Gary to bite him.
26	6	"The Chicken and the Pear"	Rebecca Asher	Aaron Brownstein & Simon Ganz	March 29, 2019
Joel and Sheila look for Ron. Tommy returns to talk to Joel and give him all the information he collected on Sheila. Joel asks about how to become the Knights of Serbia replacement. Abby meets Jean and Jean insults Abby in front of Sheila. Sheila causes the woman to have a minor episode causing the women to help her out. Eric helps Joel with his tasks to be a Knight of Serbia and Joel admits he knows what happened to Abby. Joel and Sheila meet Morgan, a friend of Ron's who is also a member of the undead and he tries to kill them. Abby shows up and helps save their lives, upsetting Sheila.
27	7	"A Specific Form of Recklessness"	Ken Kwapis	Caitlin Meares	March 29, 2019
The day after the events of the previous episode, has the Hammonds dealing with the aftermath. The Serbians set up a chair to hold a member of the undead hostage. Sheila admits to Gary about zombifying Jean, something Joel does not know. One of Sheila's murders shows up online due to Sheila returning the woman's cat to her. Sheila then decides to find a way to unframe the woman. Abby has to speak with the FBI and she learns that the woman believes it was Eric who blew up the fracking site. As Joel and Sheila work on figuring a plan, they find Ron, leaving a dead body in the trunk of their car. Joel is unhappy with Ron for wanting to zombify 18 people. Due to the heat, the dead body exploded. It results in them deciding to frame him for another explosion to get the FBI off Eric's back.
28	8	"Forever!"	Adam Arkin	Michael A. Ross	March 29, 2019
After framing the dead body for another explosion, Joel has ringing ears. Abby confides in Eric about having nightmares after killing a guy. Joel and Sheila try to figure out what to do about Ron. Abby learns that the head of the order was taking over the area since Joel did not join the knights. Abby and Eric learn that Eric is no longer a suspect from the FBI. Sheila brings Jean food to keep her inside and learns that the woman wants to kill her landlord. The Serbians watch from a distance as Abby and Joel tie up Ron outside on a neighbor's grass. Eric accidentally leaves a detonator in his car which is found when he is driving to his MIT interview with Winter. Jean and Sheila kill her aide, who had been scamming her. Sheila's Mr. Ball-legs escapes as they send in Joel's application to the Knights of Serbia.
29	9	"Zombody"	Steve Pink	Clay Graham	March 29, 2019
Sheila and Joel decide to gag Ron in the hopes of stopping him from making noise, or getting out and biting someone when the Grand Prior is there. Sheila's Mr. Ball-legs hides in plain sight before Petra arrives; however, it begins crawling around behind Petra during the meeting. Eric approaches Abby and reveals that the detonator was in his car and was found by Winter. Petra has to send Joel on a mission to get rid of Ron. Abby bonds with Winter after confiding in her on the truth of the fracking explosion. Ron escapes and is kidnapped by Serbians. He then zombifies them and they decide to go after Joel, right after he is knighted by Petra.
30	10	"The Cult of Sheila"	Marc Buckland	Victor Fresco	March 29, 2019
Dobrivoje Poplović follows Joel to the storage locker that housed the cooler with the dead body parts. After Joel leaves, Poplović breaks in and begins to suspect that Joel is a member of the undead. At the Hammond home, Gary decides he wants more involvement in Joel and Sheila's realty company. Sheila wants Joel to decide whether he wants to become undead to be with her forever. At the launch party, Jean, Tommy, Ron, and Poplović are unexpected guests. Poplović threatens Joel into leaving the party. Ron reveals that he zombified some people and told them everything. Sheila, Ron, Tommy, and Jean go after Joel. After revealing his plan to Joel, Poplović learns that he is not undead. Sheila finds them and Poplović stabs her with a pole and escapes. Tommy, Jean and Ron find help Joel and Sheila and then escape. Sheila goes after Poplović but Joel ultimately kills him. His former henchmen show up at the Hammond home while Abby is talking to Eric. Abby realizes they are undead and ends up killing them to save herself and Eric. After her parents return home, Abby finds Eric and discusses their possibly dating. Joel buries the men, returns home to Sheila and reveals that he wants be with her forever. Mr. Ball-Legs climbs into Joel, causing him to pass out. Sheila bites Joel in order to save him.

== Production ==
=== Development ===
Fresco came up with the premise from wanting to make "a family show with an interesting approach that we haven't seen before". The zombie angle also allowed Fresco to explore the concept of narcissism: he stated "the undead are the ultimate narcissists. They want what they want when they want it and will do anything to just have what they want and don't care about other people's needs."

For the setting, Fresco drew from his own experience growing up in San Fernando Valley. Santa Clarita was chosen because of its middle class residents. The Hammonds' profession as realtors was chosen because "it gets them out into the world" as well as the "forced friendliness" inherent to the profession.

=== Promotion ===
Hal Johnson and Joanne McLeod appeared in a Canadian promo for the series, promoting the eponymous "diet" in a parody of their Body Break series of television PSAs.

In February 2017, advertising for the show sparked criticism in Germany, where Netflix promoted the show with posters depicting a human finger sliced up like a currywurst, a popular German fast food dish. After receiving more than 50 complaints that the advertising was glorifying violence and inducing fear, especially in children, the German Advertising Council, a self-regulatory institution, forwarded the complaints to the company. Netflix then decided to end the campaign and remove all posters.

== Reception ==
The first season of Santa Clarita Diet received generally positive reviews from critics. On Rotten Tomatoes, the season has an approval rating of 78% based on 73 reviews, with an average rating of 7.20/10. The site's critical consensus reads, "Santa Clarita Diet serves up an excellent cast, frequent laughs, and an engaging premise – but the level of gore might not be to everyone's taste." Metacritic reports that the first season received "generally favorable reviews" with a score of 67 out of 100, based on 30 critics.

The second season received generally positive reviews as well. The season has an approval rating of 89% based on 19 reviews, with an average rating of 7.85/10 on Rotten Tomatoes. The site's critical consensus states: "Santa Clarita Diet rides the momentum of its freshman season with non-stop comedic gore and a big heart that bleeds – profusely – for its lovable characters."

The third season has an approval rating of 100% based on 18 reviews, with an average rating of 7.78/10 on Rotten Tomatoes. The website's critical consensus reads, "Santa Clarita Diet's third season is a generous meal of entrails, morbid humor, and a touching affirmation of marital love – with Barrymore and Olyphant's pitch-perfect chemistry brightening each blood-soaked installment."

== See also ==
- Cannibalism in popular culture
