= Andy Richter Controls the Universe =

2002 American TV sitcom

- Genre: Sitcom
- Created by: Victor Fresco
- Starring: Andy Richter; Paget Brewster; Irene Molloy; Jonathan Slavin; James Patrick Stuart
- Narrated by: Andy Richter
- Country of origin: United States
- Original language: English
- No. of seasons: 2
- No. of episodes: 19

Production
- Executive producer: Victor Fresco
- Producer: Andy Richter
- Camera setup: Single-camera
- Running time: 30 minutes
- Production companies: Garfield Grove Productions; 20th Century Fox Television; Paramount Network Television

Original release
- Network: Fox
- Release: March 19, 2002 – January 12, 2003

Andy Richter Controls the Universe is an American sitcom created by Victor Fresco that originally aired on Fox from March 19, 2002, to January 12, 2003. The series was Andy Richter's first starring role after leaving NBC's Late Night with Conan O'Brien in 2000, and centers around Richter's eponymous character, a writer living in Chicago who works at a fictional company called Pickering Industries. The show was a joint production of Garfield Grove Productions and 20th Century Fox Television in association with Paramount Television.

Filmed in Los Angeles, California using a single-camera setup, the series was developed after Richter expressed interest in expanding his acting repertoire beyond his previous sidekick role on late-night television. It utilizes a unique narrative style, blending nonlinear storytelling with the unreliable narrator trope. The show features an ensemble cast, including Paget Brewster, Irene Molloy, Jonathan Slavin, and James Patrick Stuart.

Andy Richter Controls the Universe received critical acclaim for its inventive humor and writing, drawing comparisons to other successful Fox comedies such as The Simpsons. Despite positive reviews, the series suffered from low ratings, leading to its cancellation after two mid-season runs. The series has since gained a cult following and is regarded as a forerunner to the wave of single-camera comedies that followed, such as Arrested Development.

== Production ==
=== Conception and development ===
Andy Richter had departed his long-time role as sidekick on Late Night with Conan O'Brien in 2000, after performing in the role since 1993. He expressed a desire to play different roles to the "fat slob roles" he was being offered at the time, and to expand his profile and "see what's out there".

Andy Richter Controls the Universe was the first sitcom that Richter starred in. Some were unsure of Richter's acting ability due to his sidekick role on Late Night. Richter described an encounter with a Paramount executive after the table read for the series pilot in which the executive exclaimed, "Wow, you can really act!"

Richter met with many creators and writers before deciding to work with Victor Fresco, who already had a deal with Paramount Television. Actress Paget Brewster was already separately familiar with both Richter and Fresco and helped to arrange a meeting between the two. In initial meetings, Fresco and Richter developed the show's concept, including the use of narration and the unreliable narrator trope, following which Fresco wrote the show's pilot episode. He pitched the show to Fox executives by handing them the first scene to read, and leaving the room as they read it. Executives were enthusiastic, following which he wrote the pilot.

Brewster was cast in the role of Jessica Green after another actress played the part in the original pilot. Fox executives vetoed the original actress as they had previously seen her in pilots that were unsuccessful. Brewster had had a development deal with Fox for two years before the show began. She was required to audition for the show three times against many other actresses.

=== Filming ===
After Fox picked up the show, a writer's room was assembled. Writer Jim Bernstein recalled that Richter himself would sometimes be in the writer's room, bucking usual convention, to be supportive and assist. He referred to the writers as "The Nerd Tower".

The show's working title was Anything Can Happen, which was vetoed by executives. NBC insisted that the title feature Richter's name, which he later said he "wasn't entirely comfortable with". He then pitched the final title, intentionally making it more grandiose for comedic effect. He later called it a "terrible" title, due to viewers' tendency to forget the entire phrase.

The show was a joint production of Garfield Grove Productions and 20th Century Fox Television in association with Paramount Television.

=== Structure ===
Andy Richter Controls the Universe was heavily centered around Richter's eponymous character, who was also the narrator, continually explaining the plot and his thought processes throughout each episode. The show used nonlinear narrative techniques for comedic effect, for example in the pilot episode, rewinding the scene that had just played out in order to see an alternative version. This technique was tied to the character's occupation as a writer, and imaginative personality. The unique format allowed for the creation of unusual gags and sequences.

The series tried out different tones and styles of humor throughout its run. The premiere episode parodied political correctness in workplace hirings, and addressed race relations in a comedic manner. It was noted for its tendency to put a twist on standard sitcom plots and scenarios. One season one episode featured a live kangaroo, which was a "true test of patience" for Richter. The series used music from the 1960s and 1970s.

The outside shots of Andy's office are taken from the Duke & Duke building from Trading Places.

=== Soundtrack ===
All music from the show was written by Greg Burns, Jeff Burns, and Brian Kirk. The theme song is sung by Jason Cropper, the original guitarist for Weezer. The song was written for the show, and there is not a full version beyond the short clip in the beginning. However, a slightly longer version of the song is evident on the pilot episode.

=== Cancellation ===
Andy Richter Controls the Universe was cancelled by Fox in 2003 after two mid-season runs. The series received lukewarm ratings throughout its run. Only 14 of the 19 produced episodes were aired by Fox.

Its changing timeslot was later cited as making the show hard to find for viewers, at a time when scheduling was important for television success, and potentially a reason for the poor ratings. Episodes were only ordered in chunks following the pilot. Richter later said he was "deeply, deeply disappointed" about the show's end, and said he was "very very proud" of its legacy. He also speculated that the show not being fully owned by Fox contributed to its cancellation, as well as not being centered around family like other Fox shows of the era.

Reruns of all 19 episodes continued to air on HDNet from mid-2003 until 2006. The series was also shown on the Paramount Comedy Channel, the Irish network TV3, and on the Polish edition of Comedy Central.

== Characters ==
The surnames of the characters are very rarely mentioned – with the exception of Andy, most are only mentioned once in the entire series.

=== Main ===
- Andy Richter: The character, sharing his name with the actor, is an aspiring writer living in Chicago who wants to write short stories. However, he is forced to work as a technical manual writer for Pickering Industries, the fifth largest company in America, to pay the bills. Andy is shy and not good with women. He does not really want to be working at the company, though he is very good at his job.
- Jessica Green (played by Paget Brewster): Jessica worked with Andy for years before she became the head of Andy's department, and thus, his boss. They tried dating once, but it did not work out. She often has to act as an intermediary between her superiors and Andy and his co-workers, forcing her to take sides. She is fairly superficial when it comes to men.
- Wendy McKay (played by Irene Molloy): Wendy is the receptionist at Andy's office, who Andy is attracted to. However, he finds out that since he has not made a move in a month, Keith has started to date her.
- Byron Togler (played by Jonathan Slavin): Byron is a new illustrator who moves into Andy's office, which annoys Andy in the pilot episode. Byron is fairly insecure and shy.
- Keith (played by James Patrick Stuart): Keith is Andy's best friend and co-worker and one usually sticks up for the other. He is the handsome guy in the office who has things handed to him because he's good-looking.

=== Others ===
Pickering Industries was founded by Mr. Pickering (John Bliss). Despite being long-dead, he appears in several episodes and has discussions with Andy within the latter's imagination. His viewpoints are typically antiquated and contrary to political correctness to an extreme degree. His comments often seem to represent a negative aspect of Andy's mind, such as guilt, or self-doubt.

Teak (Charlie Finn) and Phil (Sean Gunn) live in the same building as Andy. They had been members of the same fraternity as Andy, ten years after Andy was a member. As such, they look up to him. It is hinted that Phil might be gay.

=== Guest appearances ===
Conan O'Brien appears as Pickering's new CEO in the episode "Crazy in Rio". Other stars to have guest roles include Cedric Yarbrough, Jon Cryer, Molly Sims, Beth Littleford, Rick Peters, Bree Turner, Jarrad Paul, Rex Lee, Lola Glaudini, Patricia Belcher and June Lockhart, who plays Andy's grandmother.

== Episodes ==
=== Broadcast history ===
Season	Time
2001–02	Tuesday at 8:30
2002–03	Sunday at 9:30 (Episodes 1–2, 4, 6–8); Tuesday at 8:30 (Episodes 3, 5)

=== Season 1 (2002) ===
No. overall	No. in season	Title	Directed by	Written by	Original release date	Prod. code	U.S. viewers (millions)
1	1	"Pilot"	Andy Ackerman	Victor Fresco	March 19, 2002	001	9.77
Andy has a crush on Wendy, but she is dating Keith. A new employee, Byron, is put in Andy's office which is barely big enough for Andy to begin with. Andy can't stay mad about it for too long, however, since Byron turns out to be a great guy.
4	2	"Grief Counselor"	Andy Ackerman	Michael A. Ross	March 26, 2002	004	8.73
After a man named Charlie dies, the company forces everyone to see a grief counselor. Byron uses it to open up all of his sorrow and causes the grief counselor to commit suicide.
6	3	"Little Andy in Charge"	Andy Ackerman	Michael Shipley & Jim Bernstein	April 2, 2002	006	6.62
Andy has a crisis of conscience when he learns that the beautiful woman he is dating is a bigot. Jessica goes out partying before a big meeting and her tiredness plays to her advantage.
2	4	"The Second Episode"	Andy Ackerman	Victor Fresco	April 9, 2002	002	7.12
Andy is upset to be forced to share his office with yet another person (Cedric Yarbrough), making 3 people total in an office designed for one, this time an overly friendly and cheerful man who is also named Andy.
5	5	"Gimme a C"	Will Mackenzie	Jennifer Celotta	April 16, 2002	005	6.36
The gang gets irritated at Lemuel Praeger (Jon Cryer), vice-president of the company, constant cost cutting and so plays a prank on him, which they later regret when they learn he has cancer. Praeger then uses this against them and makes them do various things to make up for it.
7	6	"Wedding"	Andy Ackerman	Tim Doyle	April 23, 2002	007	6.04
The gang goes to a wedding. Andy wakes up in Byron's bed and they wonder how that happened.

=== Season 2 (2002–03) ===
No. overall	No. in season	Title	Directed by	Written by	Original release date	Prod. code	U.S. viewers (millions)
11	1	"We're All The Same, Only Different"	Andy Ackerman	Victor Fresco	December 1, 2002	011	7.42
Andy makes a disparaging remark about Irish people, offending a friend of his that he didn't know was of Irish descent. No one else thinks it's a big deal until the Irish CEO finds out about it and makes everyone in Andy's department as well as every manager in the chain of command between himself and Andy take sensitivity training classes. Meanwhile, Andy learns sensitivity as a relationship blossoms between himself and his new African/Irish/American girlfriend (Dawnn Lewis).
12	2	"Twins"	Andy Ackerman	Rob Ulin	December 8, 2002	012	6.89
A pair of identical twins is sharing Jessica as their girlfriend. Everything will be fine as long as they don't find out that she knows.
3	3	"France"	John Fortenberry	Will Gluck	December 10, 2002	003	5.92
Andy convinces Jessica to send him instead of Keith (who really doesn't want to go anyway) on an important business trip to France. Then, Andy and Jessica learn that Byron speaks fluent French!
13	4	"Holy Sheep"	Andy Ackerman	Jennifer Celotta	December 15, 2002	013	7.45
Byron struggles to remain celibate so that he can be initiated into his new religion, "Zumanism" as the beautiful daughter of the founder of the church (Molly Sims) tries desperately to seduce him.
14	5	"Relationship Ripcord"	Lee Shallat-Chemel	Michael Shipley & Jim Bernstein	December 17, 2002	014	6.75
Andy and friends eavesdrop on the therapy session of a beautiful woman and Andy decides to exploit what he hears to start a relationship with her.
9	6	"The Show Might Go On"	Andy Ackerman	Jay Dyer	December 22, 2002	009	5.71
Wendy is the understudy to the leading actress (Beth Littleford) in a local play. Andy and Keith conspire to make the actress miss a performance so that Wendy can get her big break.
17	7	"Crazy in Rio"	Andy Ackerman	Michael A. Ross	January 5, 2003	017	7.92
The new CEO of Pickering industries (Conan O'Brien) takes a liking to Andy and promotes him to a lofty executive position. There's only one problem, the new CEO is completely insane.
15	8	"The Maid Man"	Andy Ackerman	Matthew Weiner	January 12, 2003	015	6.61
Andy falls for Jessica's Russian housekeeper (Lola Glaudini), creating friction between himself and Jessica when the shallow infatuation runs its course.
8	9	"Bully the Kid"	Bryan Gordon	Steve Baldikoski & Bryan Behar	Unaired (Aired: Jun.14, 2004 on HDNet)	008	N/A
Andy drops the ball when asked to watch Jessica's nephew, who then blackmails Andy and Jessica so that he won't tell his mom about Andy and Jessica's lack of responsibility.
10	10	"Duh Dog"	John Fortenberry	Tommy Blacha	Unaired (Aired: Jun.21, 2004 on HDNet)	010	N/A
Andy makes a sarcastic remark about a "big stupid dog" that catches everyone's attention and ends up becoming the company mascot.
16	11	"Final Fantasy"	John Fortenberry	Eric Kaplan	Unaired (Aired: Jun.28, 2004 on HDNet)	016	N/A
Wendy takes a crack at writing fantasy fiction. Byron accidentally becomes a pimp.
19	12	"Charity Begins in D Block"	Andy Ackerman	Dave Jeser & Matt Silverstein	Unaired (Aired: Jul.5, 2004 on HDNet)	019	N/A
Andy and Jessica volunteer as mentors at a prison. Their competitiveness gets the better of them as they coach their respective prisoners in a poetry competition.
18	13	"Saturday Early Evening Fever"	Jay Chandrasekhar	Tommy Blacha	Unaired (Aired: Jul.12, 2004 on HDNet)	018	N/A
Twenty-something Byron begins dating Andy's eighty-something grandmother (June Lockhart).

== Reception ==
Andy Richter Controls the Universe received positive reviews from critics. Tim Goodman of SFGATE praised the series, particularly the writing, saying that it had "smart wit" and favorably comparing it to fellow Fox sitcom The Simpsons. Ken Tucker of Entertainment Weekly said in a review of the second season that the series had become its own "perfectly realized comic universe", praising its improvement over the first season, which was "funny but hit-or-miss". He further praised the cast performances, particularly Brewster's. Tucker criticised some jokes in an earlier review that he regarded to be in poor taste.

Salon.com praised the series as "absurdly hilarious" and lauded its take on office humor. Variety said the series "has the feel of a singular vision — there isn’t a single line in any of the three episodes that felt like it was written by a committee" and said it had the potential to be the most-talked-about comedy from the 2001–02 television season, calling it "a true water-cooler conversation generator".

TIME praised the DVD release, saying the show was "what the DVD format was created for".

=== Legacy ===
TV Guide included the series in their 2013 list of 60 shows that were "Cancelled Too Soon". ScreenRant said in 2020 that it had become "something of a cult sitcom", even going back to the airing of its second season. Tara Ariano of Cracked called it an "extremely underrated surrealist sitcom", and lamented its lack of inclusion on modern streaming services. Vulture said it was the "most inventive and funny" of Richter's sitcoms.

The series has continued to be positively compared to similar shows such as Arrested Development, also on Fox. Frequent series director Andy Ackerman speculated in a retrospective interview that the show was "a year too soon", before the rise of single-camera television, and praised the show, calling it one of his favorite working experiences. Brewster later said that the cast and crew "definitely got the impression that we weren't welcome on the network at the time". Andy Richter Controls the Universe was later noted as being part of a wave of similar single-camera comedies that experimented with the traditional sitcom format, such as Malcolm in the Middle and Scrubs.

=== Accolades ===
Creator and writer Victor Fresco was nominated for the Primetime Emmy Award for Outstanding Writing for a Comedy Series in 2002 for his work on the show.

== Home release ==
On March 24, 2009, CBS DVD (distributed by Paramount) released all 19 episodes of Andy Richter Controls the Universe on DVD in Region 1. Some music cues were replaced for the home media release due to licensing issues.

DVD name	Ep #	Release date	Additional information
Andy Richter Controls the Universe: The Complete Series	19	March 24, 2009	Audio commentaries; How Andy Richter Controlled the Universe featurette; What if Andy Richter Controlled the Universe featurette

== See also ==
- Quintuplets – Andy Richter's subsequent sitcom
- Andy Barker, P.I. – Andy Richter's third sitcom
