= Victor Fresco =

American television writer and producer

- Born: January 9, 1958 (age 68); Los Angeles, California, U.S.
- Occupations: Television writer, producer
- Known for: Santa Clarita Diet, Andy Richter Controls the Universe

Victor Fresco (born January 9, 1958) is an American television writer and producer.

== Personal life ==
Born and raised in Los Angeles, Fresco received his bachelor's degree in film and political science from Hampshire College. After graduating, he worked in television commercials as a production assistant and as a prop master.

His brothers are director Michael Fresco and television drama writer Rob Fresco.

== Career ==
Fresco was nominated for the Primetime Emmy Award for Outstanding Comedy Series in the second season of Mad About You and the Primetime Emmy Award for Outstanding Writing for a Comedy Series for Andy Richter Controls the Universe. He created the ABC television series Better Off Ted, which ran for two seasons. Fresco created other television shows, including Life on a Stick, The Trouble with Normal and Sean Saves the World.

He served as the creator, showrunner and executive producer of the Netflix comedy horror series Santa Clarita Diet. He's stated that he came up with the concept of a suburban zombie show because he wanted to do "...a family show with an interesting approach that we haven't seen before."

As of 2022, he is developing a comedy series for HBO Max about first daughter Alice Roosevelt Longworth.
