= Michael Shipley (screenwriter) =

American television writer and producer

- Education: UC Santa Cruz
- Occupations: Screenwriter and producer
- Parent: William F. Shipley (father)
- Writing career
- Notable works: Family Guy; American Dad!; My Name is Earl
- Website: michaelshipley.org

Michael Shipley is a television writer and producer whose credits include Family Guy, My Name Is Earl, American Dad!, Andy Richter Controls the Universe, Better Off Ted and others. He is currently an executive producer on Last Man Standing with Tim Allen on Fox.

In 2014, Shipley and Eva Longoria made thirteen episodes of the animated show Mother Up! for Hulu.

== Background ==
Shipley grew up in the beachside town of Santa Cruz, California, the son of William F. Shipley, a UC Berkeley/Santa Cruz linguistics professor who specialized in Native American languages, and a psychiatrist mother. He attended Santa Cruz High School, then the University of California, Santa Cruz for college.

Following a post-college relocation to Los Angeles, Michael wrote, performed and directed with several sketch comedy groups including Fun with Weasels and 3 Guys in Raincoats.

As a teenager, Michael performed community theater with Emmy-award-winning actress Camryn Manheim. He has one sister, Freya, who is an actress and Montessori teacher. His mother Barbara Shipley died when Michael was 23. His father William Shipley died in 2011.

== Personal ==
In addition to writing for television, Shipley writes and records noise and is an avid photographer. He currently resides in Santa Monica, California.

== Awards ==
Shipley has been nominated for an Emmy for his work on American Dad!, as well as an NAACP award.
