= Bushnak =

Bushnaks
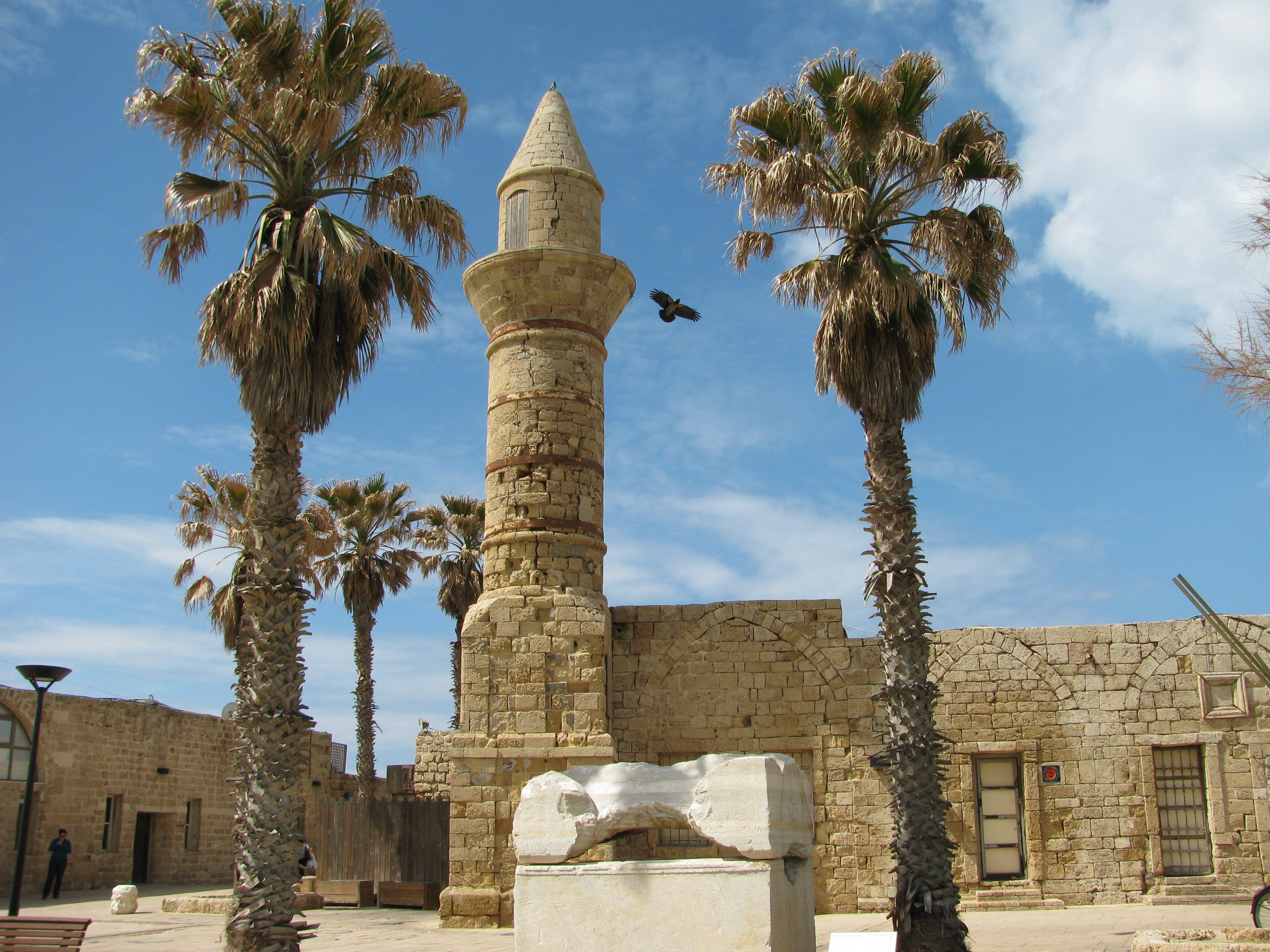
- The mosque in Caesarea, Israel

Regions with significant populations
- Syria, Palestine, Israel, Lebanon, Jordan, Saudi Arabia

Religion
- Sunni Islam

Related ethnic groups
- Bosniaks in Turkey; Bosniaks in Syria

Bushnak (Arabic: بشناق, meaning "Bosnian", also transliterated Bushnaq, Boshnak, Bouchenak and Bouchnak) is a surname among Levantines and Saudis (Arabic-speakers) of Bosnian Muslim origin. Those sharing this surname are the descendants of Bosnian Muslims, apprehensive of living under Christian rule after the Austro-Hungarian occupation of Bosnia and Herzegovina in 1878, immigrated to Ottoman Syria.

While not originally from one family, most Bosnian Muslims who immigrated to the Levant adopted Bushnak as a common surname, attesting to their origins.

== History ==
Some Bosnian movement to Palestine occurred when Bosnian Muslim soldiers were brought to Palestine in the late 1800s to provide reinforcements for the Ottoman army.

More substantial movement occurred after 1878, when the Austro-Hungarian empire, ruled by the House of Habsburg, occupied Bosnia. Bosnian Muslim emigration continued through this period, escalating after the Austro-Hungarian's 1908 annexation of Bosnia. Many immigrated to parts of what is now modern Turkey, while a smaller number settled in Ottoman Syria (modern Syria, Israel, Palestine, Lebanon and Jordan).

Bosnian immigrants settled predominantly in villages in the parts of the present day West Bank and Israel: Caesarea, Yanun, Nablus and Tulkarem. Their descendants still live in these villages, their Bosnian heritage reflected in the Arab surname of Bushnak.

== Notable people bearing the surname ==
=== Bushnag ===
- Mohammed Bushnag, Saudi Deputy Minister for the Tourism Human Capital at the Saudi Ministry of Tourism.

=== Bushnak ===
- Ramez Bushnak (1976–2000), an Israeli Arab civilian shot dead by Israeli police during the Second Intifada

=== Bushnaq ===
- Ali Bushnaq, Palestinian Mount Everest climber
- Alia Bushnaq (born 2000), Jordanian athlete
- Suzan Bushnaq (born 1963), Kuwaiti painter, daughter of Mohammed Bushnaq
- Suad Bushnaq (born 1982), Jordanian-Canadian film composer
- Mohammed Bushnaq (1934–2017), Palestinian artist (painter and sculptor)

=== Bouchnak ===
- Lotfi Bouchnak (born 1952), Tunisian singer
- Hamid Bouchnak (born 1969), Moroccan raï singer

=== Boushnak ===
- Laura Boushnak (born 1976), Kuwaiti-born Palestinian photographer

== See also ==
- Bosniak diaspora
- Bosniaks in Syria
- Armas
- Magyarab
- Urums

== Notes and references ==
=== Bibliography ===
- Khalifeh, Sahar (2005). The Inheritance. Cairo and New York, NY: American University in Cairo Press. ISBN 978-977-424-939-6.
