= Ethnic groups in Syria =

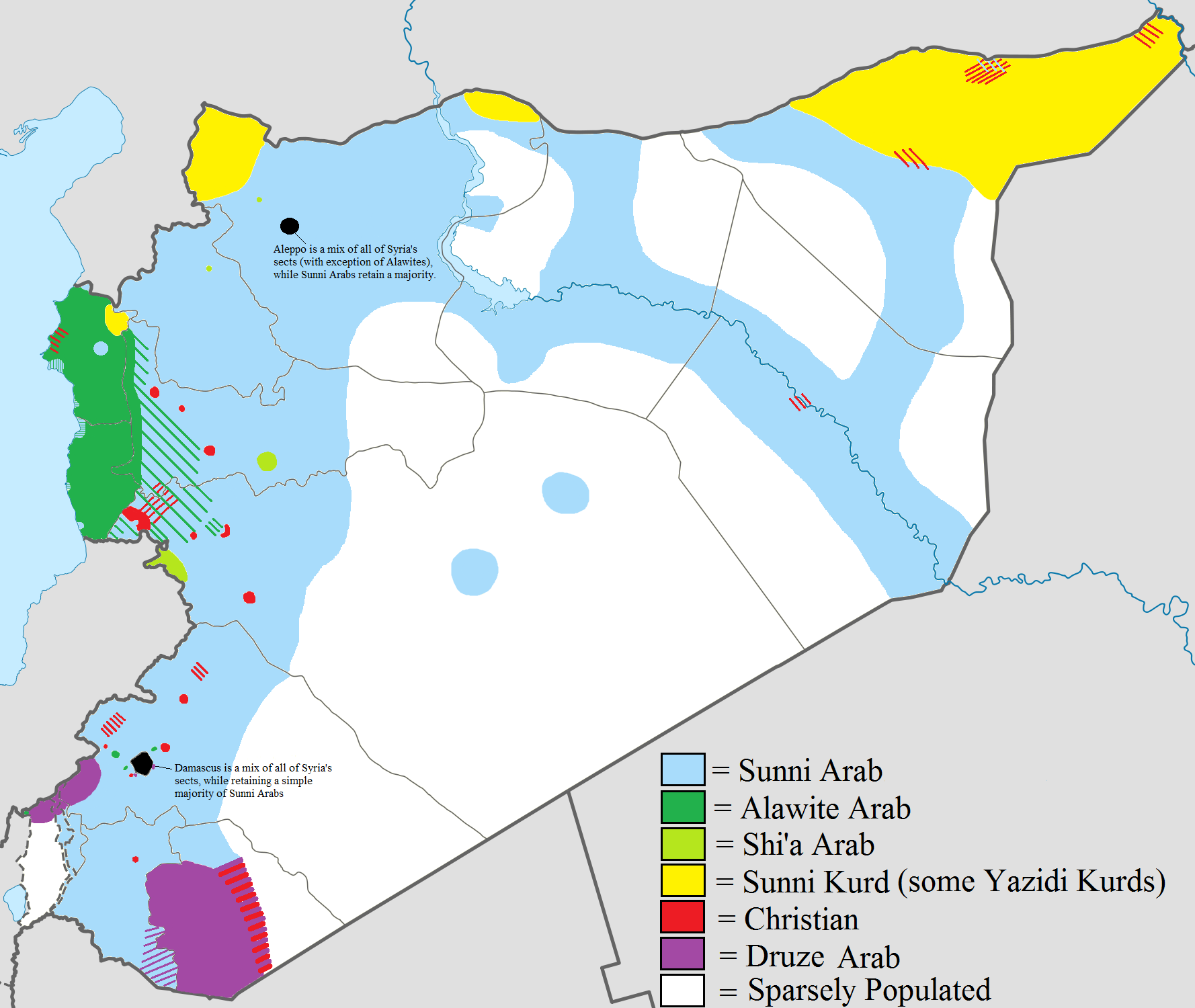
Ethnoreligious map of Syria. Sunni Arabs Alawite Arabs Shia Arabs Sunni Kurds (some Yazidi Kurds) Christians (Arabs, Assyrians, Armenians, Greeks, etc.) Druze Arabs Sparsely populated

Arabs represent the major ethnicity in Syria, in addition to the presence of several, much smaller ethnic groups.

== Ethnicity, religion and national/ideological identities ==
Ethnicity and religion are intertwined in Syria as in other countries in the region, but there are also nondenominational, supraethnic and suprareligious political identities, like Syrian nationalism.

== Counting the ethnic or religious groups ==
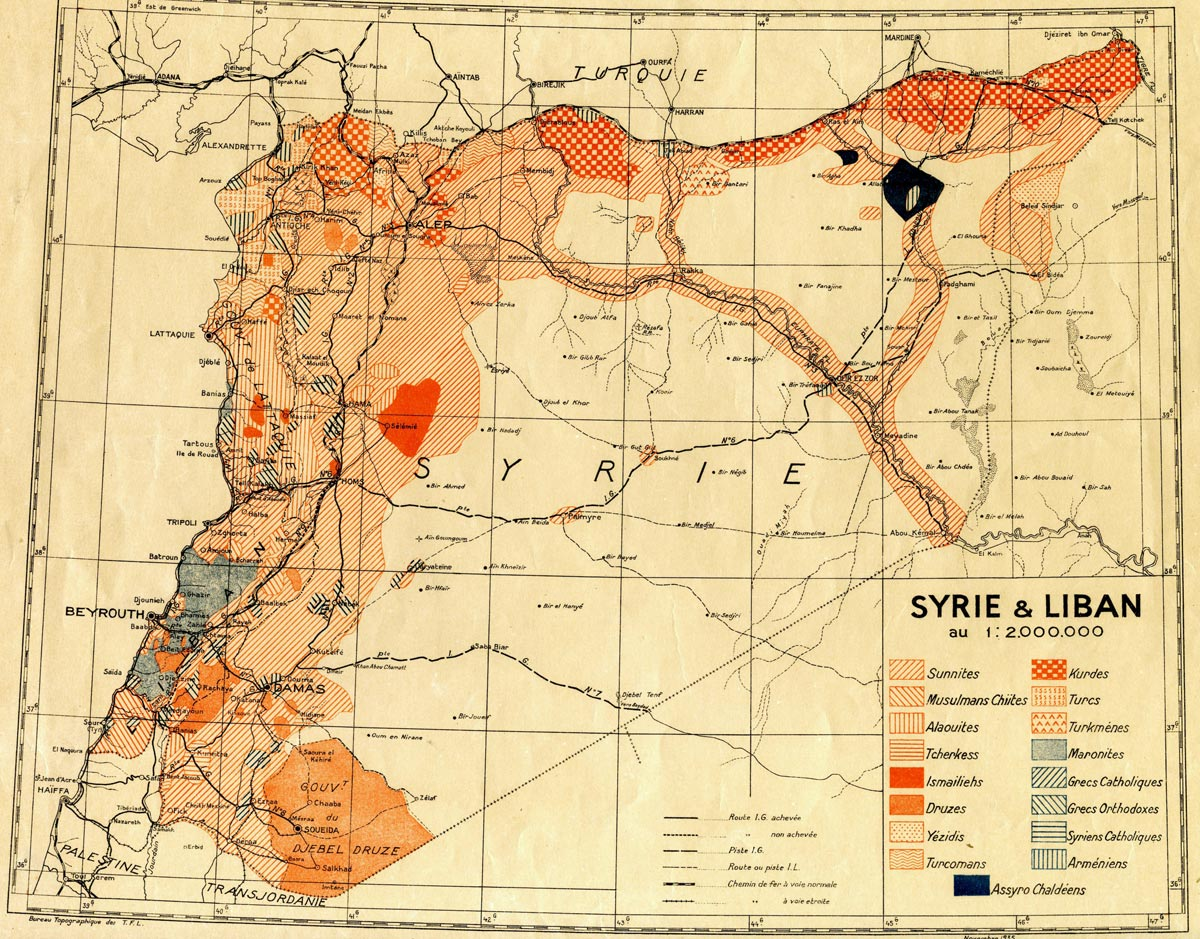
Ethno-religious makeup of Syria, 1935. Map from La cartothèque de l'Ifpo (Institut français du Proche-Orient)

Since the 1960 census there has been no counting of Syrians by religion, and there has never been any official counting by ethnicity or language. In the 1943 and 1953 censuses the various denominations were counted separately, e.g. for every Christian denomination. In 1960 Syrian Christians were counted as a whole but Muslims were still counted separately between Sunnis and Alawis.

== Ethnic and religious groups ==
The majority of Syrians speak Arabic, except for a minority of Assyrians, Mandeans and 'Arameans of the Anti-Lebanon Mountains' who speak Neo-Aramaic; Kurdish speaking Syrian Kurds; Turkish speaking Syrian Turkmens; and Armenian speakers who altogether form 5-10% of the population. Syrian Arabs form ~90-95% and the remaining ~5-10% consist of minor ethnoreligious groups including the Druze (3%), Isma'ilis, Mhallami, Yezidi and Twelver Shiite Muslims (the latter two together also about 3%). However, these percentages are only indicative.

=== Arabs ===
The majority of Syrian Arabs speak a variety of dialects belonging to Levantine Arabic. Arab tribes and clans of Bedouin descent are mainly concentrated in the governorates of al-Hasakah, Deir ez-Zor, Raqqa and eastern Aleppo, forming roughly 30% of the total population and speaking a dialect related to Bedouin and Najdi Arabic. In Deir ez-Zor a dialect of North Mesopotamian Arabic is also spoken, reminiscent of that of medieval Iraq prior the Mongol invasions in 1258.

- Arab minority groups
  - Alawites
  - Arab Christians (predominantly Rūm-Orthodox and Melkite-Catholic Christians)
  - Arab Ismailis
  - Arab Twelver Shias
  - Druze
  - Sunni Muslim and Christian Palestinians

=== Non-Arabs ===
Syrian Kurds form 5 to 10% of the Syrian population, the largest non-Arab minority. Yezidis, a non Muslim group are often counted among Kurds. Other non-Arabic-speaking Muslim groups include Syrian Turkmen, who had settled Syria in Mamluk and Ottoman times, Syrian Circassians and Syrian Chechens who settled in the 19th century, Syrian Bosniaks who settled in the 1870s and Greek Muslims who were resettled in Syria following the Greco-Turkish War of 1897. The Assyrians form a multi-denominational Christian minority, mainly in northeastern Syria, where they have been indigenous since the Bronze Age.

- Muslim minority groups
  - Sunni Kurds
  - Alevi Turkmens
  - Sunni Turkmens
  - Sunni Chechens
  - Sunni Circassians
  - Sunni Bosniaks
  - Sunni Greeks
  - Sunni Ossetians
  - Black people of Yarmouk Basin, descendants of sub Saharan African slaves brought to the region during the Middle Ages.
- Christian minority groups
  - Assyrians, a Semitic Christian indigenous people of Northeast Syria, who speak various Neo-Aramaic languages belonging to the Eastern Aramaic branch.
  - Armenians
  - Greeks
  - Italians
- Other groups
  - Romani people (Kawliya) of various creeds
  - Yazidi Kurds
  - Mizrahi Jews
  - Mandeans, a formerly predominantly Eastern Aramaic-speaking Gnostic people, the largest population of displaced Mandeans resides in the rural areas of Damascus.
  - Arameans (Syriacs) of the Anti-Lebanon Mountains. The communities of Maaloula, Jubb'adin and Bakh'a speak Western Neo-Aramaic, which belongs to the Western Aramaic branch.

== See also ==
- Demographics of Syria
- Languages of Syria
- Religion in Syria
- Sectarianism and minorities in the Syrian Civil War
- Federalization of Syria
