= Sadie Calvano =

American actress

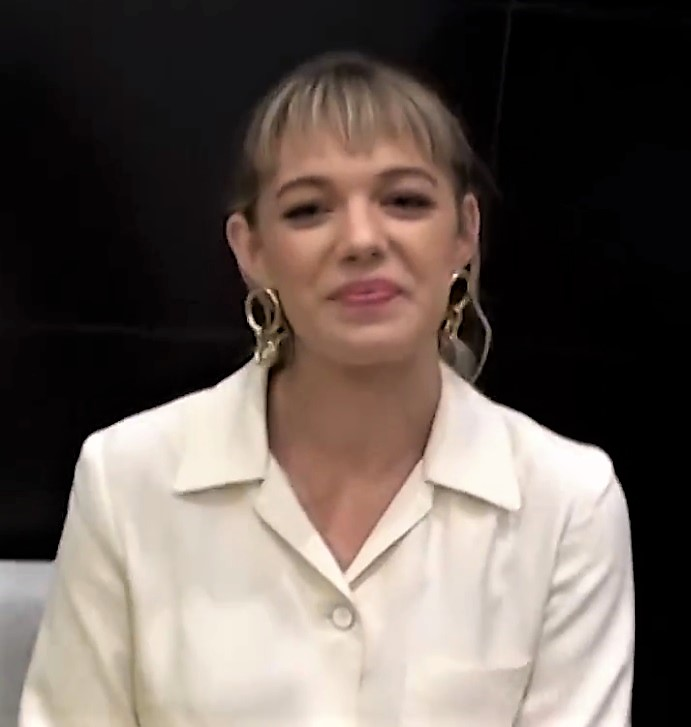
- Calvano interviewed by Dulce Osuna in 2018.
- Born: April 8, 1997 (age 29); Los Angeles, California, U.S.
- Education: Occidental College
- Occupation: Actress
- Years active: 2010–present
- Website: sadiecalvano.com

Sadie Calvano (born April 8, 1997) is an American actress, known for her role as Violet Plunkett on the CBS sitcom Mom. In 2016, she played the title role in the television film The Perfect Daughter.

== Biography ==
Calvano was born on April 8, 1997, in Los Angeles, California. She was a competitive gymnast before focusing on acting full-time after fourth grade. She attended Occidental College in Los Angeles. Calvano was cast to play the daughter of the main character in the sitcom series Mom, in which she played the character Violet Plunkett. She starred along with Brady Smith and Reiley McClendon in the TV film The Perfect Daughter. Calvano co-starred with Daniel Doheny, Geraldine Viswanathan, Luke Spencer Roberts and Eduardo Franco in the teen comedy film The Package, her character is named as Sarah. In 2019, Calvano appeared in the first season of the dark comedy anthology series Why Women Kill.

== Filmography ==
Film and television roles
Year	Title	Role	Notes	Refs
2010	NCIS	Rebecca Mason	Episode: "Worst Nightmare"	
2011	J. Edgar	Edgar's Niece	Film	
2011	Eagleheart	Julie	Episode: "Death Punch"	
2012	Village People	Ione Wilson	Unsold television pilot	
2012	Kickin' It	Lindsay	Episode: "Wazombie Warriors"	
2013	Crash & Bernstein	Jennifer	Episode: "System Crash"	
2013	Melissa & Joey	Keira	3 episodes	
2013–2016, 2018	Mom	Violet Plunkett	Main role (season 1–3); recurring role (season 4); guest (season 6)	
2016	The Perfect Daughter	Natalie Parish	Television film	
2016	The Skinny	Sadie	Web series	
2018	The Package	Sarah	Direct-to-video film	
2019	Why Women Kill	April Warner	Main role (season 1)	
2021	9-1-1: Lone Star	Keira	Episode: "Difficult Conversations"	
2021	Secrets of a Marine's Wife	Erin Corwin	Television film	
2022	The Rookie	Everest Sanders	Episode: "Real Crime"	

== Awards and nominations ==
Year	Association	Category	Work	Result	Refs
2011	Young Artist Awards	Best Performance in a TV Series – Guest Starring Young Actress 11–15	NCIS	Nominated	
2013	Young Artist Awards	Best Performance in a TV Series – Guest Starring Young Actress 14–16	Kickin' It	Nominated	
2015	Gracie Allen Awards	Outstanding Female Actor – Rising Star	Mom	Won	
