= Why Women Kill =

American dark comedy drama television series

- Title card for season 1
- Genre: Black comedy; Anthology; Crime drama
- Created by: Marc Cherry
- Starring: Lucy Liu; Ginnifer Goodwin; Kirby Howell-Baptiste; Alexandra Daddario; Sam Jaeger; Sadie Calvano; Jack Davenport; Reid Scott; Allison Tolman; Lana Parrilla; B. K. Cannon; Jordane Christie; Matthew Daddario; Verónica Falcón; Nick Frost
- Narrated by: Jack Davenport (10 episodes)
- Music by: Mateo Messina (season 1); Steve Jablonsky (season 2)
- Opening theme: "L-O-V-E" sung by Michael Feinstein
- Country of origin: United States
- Original language: English
- No. of seasons: 2
- No. of episodes: 20

Production
- Executive producers: Marc Cherry; Michael Hanel; Mindy Schultheis; Brian Grazer; Francie Calfo; Marc Webb; Samie Kim Falvey; David Warren; Austin Guzman; Curtis Kheel
- Producers: Anna Culp; Mark Grossan; Stephen Bowman; Hannah Schneider; Stacey Harman
- Cinematography: Michael A. Price; Scott Boettle; Alan Caso
- Editors: Michael Berenbaum; Andrew Doerfer; Annette Davey; Jan Northrop; Shannon Mitchell; Christopher Kroll
- Running time: 46–56 minutes per episode
- Production companies: Black Lamb; Acme Productions; Cherry Productions; Imagine Television Studios; CBS Studios

Original release
- Network: CBS All Access
- Release: August 15 – October 17, 2019
- Network: Paramount+
- Release: June 3 – July 29, 2021

Why Women Kill is an American dark comedy anthology series created by Marc Cherry, which depicts the events leading to deaths caused by women.

The first season, which premiered on August 15, 2019, on CBS All Access, consists of 10 episodes and is set in multiple periods. The second season, containing 10 episodes, premiered on June 3, 2021, on Paramount+ and focuses on a single time period. In December 2021, the series was renewed for a third season. However, in July 2022, the third season was scrapped before production could begin.

== Plot ==
The first season of Why Women Kill follows three women, each from a different recent era, who reside in the same mansion in Pasadena. All three learn of their respective husband's infidelity during their time in the house:

- Beth Ann Stanton's story begins in 1963 where she is content to serve as a charming, sweet and polite housewife, but learning of her husband Rob's unfaithfulness complicates their already-strained relationship, which holds a dark secret. She moved into the house in 1962 and left before 1974.
- In 1984, socialite Simone Grove discovers her third husband of ten years, Karl, is gay, and seeks some release via her best friend's son Tommy, who has just turned eighteen. It begins soon after she learns of his attraction to her. She moved into the house in 1974, and left in 2017.
- Attorney Taylor Harding moved into the house in 2017, and her story takes place in 2019. She is bisexual and enjoys an open marriage, but this sparks tension when she and her husband Eli become attracted to the same woman, Jade. She leaves the house in 2019, a few weeks after her storyline finishes, then a new couple moves in after her.

The second season focuses on one storyline set in 1949 Los Angeles, with Alma Fillcot, a plain Jane middle-aged housewife who decides to join a Garden Club, and Rita Castillo, the same woman inside who despises Alma and the series of murders that follow.

Each storyline reaches a turning point when the woman decides murder is a justifiable course of action.

== Cast and characters ==
=== Season 1 ===
==== 1963 ====
===== Main =====
- Ginnifer Goodwin as Beth Ann Stanton, Rob's subservient wife.
  - Hartlyn Hilsman as a young Beth Ann.
- Sam Jaeger as Rob Stanton, an aerospace engineer married to Beth Ann
- Sadie Calvano as April Warner, a waitress having an affair with Rob

===== Recurring =====
- Alicia Coppola as Sheila Mosconi, Rob and Beth Ann's neighbor and Leo's wife who befriends Beth Ann
- Adam Ferrara as Leo Mosconi, Rob and Beth Ann's neighbor and Sheila's husband
- Lindsey Kraft as Claire, Rob's secretary.

===== Guest =====
- Spencer Garrett as Hal Burke, Rob's boss
- Peri Gilpin as Vivian Burke, Hal's wife
- Lio Tipton (Note: Credited as Analeigh Tipton; Tipton came out as non-binary and changed their name in 2021.) as Mary Vlasin, Rob and Beth Ann's neighbor and Ralph's abused wife
- Scott Porter as Ralph Vlasin, Rob and Beth Ann's neighbor and Mary's abusive husband
- Ava Scarola as Emily Stanton, Rob and Beth Ann's deceased daughter
- Catherine Curry as Elsie Warner, April and Rob's daughter who is under the care of Beth Ann

==== 1984 ====
===== Main =====
- Lucy Liu as Simone Grove, a twice-divorced socialite married to Karl
  - Harmonie He as a young Simone Grove
- Jack Davenport as Karl Grove, Simone's third husband who is using their relationship to hide that he is gay

===== Recurring =====
- Katie Finneran as Naomi Harte, a wealthy friend of Simone, and Tommy's widowed mother
- Leo Howard as Tommy Harte, Naomi's son who harbors romantic feelings for Simone
- Li Jun Li as Amy Lin, Simone's daughter from her first marriage

===== Guest =====
- Charlie DePew as Brad Jenkins, Amy's fiancé
- Ken Garito as the police officer who mistakes Simone for a prostitute
- Christine Estabrook as Joyce Dubner, a hypochondriac neighbor of Simone
- Philip Anthony-Rodriguez as Hector, Simone's former hairdresser and Karl's lover
- Dale Dickey as Ruby Jenkins, Brad's mother
- Robert Craighead as Dwight Jenkins, Brad's father
- Hayley Hasselhoff as Patty Jenkins, Brad's lesbian sister

==== 2019 ====
===== Main =====
- Kirby Howell-Baptiste as Taylor Harding, a bisexual, feminist attorney in an open marriage with Eli
  - Kendall Denise Clark as a young Taylor Harding
- Reid Scott as Eli Cohen, a screenwriter in an open marriage with Taylor
- Alexandra Daddario as Jade/Irene, the bisexual lover of Taylor, and then Eli

===== Recurring =====
- Kevin Daniels as Lamar, Eli's agent
- Kevin McNamara as Duke, Jade's ex-boyfriend

===== Guest =====
- Saidha Arrika Ekulona as Taylor's sister
- Christina Anthony as Velma, Taylor's sister
- Odelya Halevi as Willow, an Instagram model working with Mischa and a friend of Jade
- Kevin William Paul as Mischa, Willow's fellow Instagram model, who is friends with Jade

=== Season 2 ===
==== Main ====
- Allison Tolman as Alma Fillcot, a housewife in 1949 who is desperate to join the local exclusive Elysian Park Garden Club
  - Rachel Redleaf as young Alma
- Lana Parrilla as Rita Castillo, the president of the club and the gold-digging wife of Carlo
- B. K. Cannon as Dee Fillcot, Alma's daughter
- Jordane Christie as Vern Loomis, a private investigator
- Matthew Daddario as Scooter, a struggling actor and Rita's paramour
- Verónica Falcón as Catherine Castillo, Rita's stepdaughter and Carlo's spinster daughter
- Nick Frost as Bertram Fillcot, Alma's husband and a veterinarian

==== Recurring ====
- Rachel Bay Jones as Maisie
- Daniel Zacapa as Carlo Castillo, Rita's elderly husband and Catherine's father
- Eileen Galindo as Isabel, Rita's maid who is secretly her accomplice and cousin
- Rondi Reed as Mrs. Carol Yost, the Fillcot's grouchy, judgmental next door neighbor who expresses disbelief for Alma getting into the club
- Virginia Williams as Grace, a member of the club
- Jessica Phillips as Joan, another member of the club
- Kerry O'Malley as Mavis, another member of the club
- Cynthia Quiles as Brenda, another member of the club
- Jack Davenport as The Narrator
- Warren Kole as Detective Rohbin

==== Guest ====
- Ryan McPartlin as Tom Madison
- Andrew Leeds as Dr. Gibson

== Episodes ==
=== Series overview ===
Season	Episodes	Originally released		
Season	Episodes	First released	Last released	Network
1	10	August 15, 2019	October 17, 2019	CBS All Access
2	10	June 3, 2021	July 29, 2021	Paramount+

=== Season 1 (2019) ===
No. overall	No. in season	Title	Directed by	Written by	Original release date
1	1	"Murder Means Never Having to Say You're Sorry"	Marc Webb	Marc Cherry	August 15, 2019
In 1963, Rob Stanton, an aeroengineer, and his spouse, Beth Ann Stanton, a housewife, move into a Pasadena mansion following the death of their young daughter. After meeting Leo and Sheila Mosconi, Beth Ann overhears Sheila telling someone that Leo had witnessed Rob kissing a waitress. Beth Ann refuses to believe her husband's infidelity until she sees Rob kiss the waitress firsthand. At Sheila's suggestion, Beth Ann goes to the diner to confront the waitress, who she learns is named April. However, Beth Ann loses her nerve and instead befriends April, although she keeps her identity secret. In 1984, socialite Simone Grove lives in the mansion with Karl, her third husband of ten years who owns a successful art gallery. At a party, Simone learns of her husband's homosexuality when she finds pictures of Karl kissing a man. Simone demands that Karl leave, but Karl instead appears to attempt suicide by overdosing on pills. After Karl is sent to the hospital, Tommy Harte, the son of Simone's best friend Naomi, admits to Simone that he saw the photos and makes a romantic pass at her. While flattered, Simone declines his advances, as he is just under the age of consent. Tommy leaves, but tells Simone he has been in love with her for years. In 2019, Taylor Harding and Eli Cohen are a married couple in an open marriage. Taylor is a successful lawyer and Eli is a screenwriter who has had some minor success. One night, Taylor brings Jade, her apparently casual hookup, home to stay with her and Eli after Jade has been threatened by her ex-boyfriend Duke. Eli is initially against having a paramour of the couple stay in their mansion longer than one night, but Jade begins happily maintaining the household and cooking meals for them, much to Taylor's delight. Eventually, after Eli finds himself becoming attracted to Jade, he agrees to allow her to stay longer.
2	2	"I'd Like to Kill Ya, but I Just Washed My Hair"	Marc Webb	Austin Guzman	August 22, 2019
In 1963, April admits to Beth Ann that she's in a relationship with a married man, still unaware that he is Beth Ann's husband. After April suggests that the affair is the result of Rob becoming bored with his wife, Beth Ann attempts to make herself more appealing to Rob by updating her style and giving him a blowjob, but her efforts culminate with her accidentally injuring him. While waiting to be treated at the hospital, Rob acknowledges that he is growing distant from Beth Ann, but stops short of admitting his infidelity. After being treated for his injury, Rob leaves the mansion, ostensibly to attend a dinner with business partners, even though Beth Ann tried to persuade him to stay, knowing that he is really meeting with April. In 1984, Simone discovers that Karl faked his suicide attempt. After Karl threatens to humiliate her by disclosing his homosexuality to her friends, and Naomi Harte reveals to her that she has known about Karl's infidelity for over a year (although she is unaware of his sexual orientation), she tries unsuccessfully force him out of the mansion. Feeling betrayed by Karl and Naomi, Simone begins an affair with Tommy, who is now a legal adult. In 2019, Eli begins to suspect that Taylor is in love with Jade after he learns that they have been seeing each other for six months, which is a violation of the rules they had established for their open marriage. Following a threesome amongst Eli, Taylor, and Jade, the two women continue their intimacy without him, which further fuels Eli's suspicions. When questioned by her husband about her relationship with Jade, Taylor reassures him that he simply feels insecure because of his career struggles.
3	3	"I Killed Everyone He Did, but Backwards and in High Heels"	David Grossman	Randi Mayem Singer	August 29, 2019
In 1963, when Beth Ann learns that Rob intends to meet with April in a nightclub to celebrate the completion of a project, she visits his office and takes the project files with her. Forced to remain in the office to recreate the project, Rob cancels his plans with April, who invites Beth Ann to go out with her. At the nightclub, April tells Beth Ann that she is not pursuing a serious relationship with Rob and has no intention of getting married, preferring to instead focus on becoming a singer. In 1984, Simone and Karl are forced to attend a charity dinner together, with Tommy serving as their waiter. Tommy grows increasingly resentful towards Karl and his treatment of Simone, culminating in him intentionally spilling food on Karl and getting fired. Afterwards, Simone chastises Tommy for his behavior. Tommy questions the status of her relationship with Karl as they still seem friendly. Simone tells Tommy that while she fully intends to divorce Karl, she does not dislike him. Karl and Simone end the evening by tangoing at the charity dinner as Tommy looks on. In 2019, at a nightclub Taylor, Eli, and Jade encounter Willow and Mischa, Jade's former romantic partners. They offer to take Jade with them to Venice the next day. Taylor becomes jealous and attempts to prevent Jade from leaving. After Eli further pressures her about her feelings for Jade, Taylor confesses that Jade helps her cope with the financial pressures she faces from being the breadwinner, which have been compounded by Eli not helping her generate income. When Jade returns to the mansion to announce that she will be leaving for Venice, Eli convinces her to stay and to make the mansion her home, and they become a "throuple."
4	4	"You Had Me at Homicide"	Valerie Weiss	Greg Malins	September 5, 2019
In 1963, April and Beth Ann go roller skating and afterwards eat brownies laced with marijuana. April admits that Rob has been doing marijuana for more excitement in his life. Beth Ann realizes she has forgotten about a dinner party at Rob's boss' home and will now have to go with Rob while high. She charms the hosts and fellow guests, but admits to Rob that she "knows what [he's] been doing". After the dinner, Rob asked how she knew about the marijuana, not knowing Beth Ann was actually referring to his infidelity. After Beth Ann does not answer, Rob tells her how he has forgotten how to enjoy life. They go rollerskating in their neighborhood and Rob starts to regain interest in Beth Ann. In 1984, when Simone refuses to accept Tommy's gift, a sports watch, Tommy leaves her in the middle of their date. Later, Amy, Simone's engaged daughter, cancels her wedding with her fiance Brad due to a misunderstanding. Tommy agrees to go on a date with Amy to make Simone jealous. After listening to a speech on love made by Karl, Simone realizes her true feelings for Tommy. She then interrupts their date to reconcile Brad and Amy, and mends her relationship with Tommy by wearing the watch he gifted her. In 2019, Jade's abusive ex-boyfriend, Duke, shows up at the mansion, but before he gets to the door, he is stopped by Taylor after she threatens to call the police. A while later, Jade gets a call from Duke to meet her or else he will kill their dog Teacup. Eli, Jade, and Taylor go to Duke's apartment to talk things out, but when Duke does not answer the door, Eli breaks one of his windows and steals the dog. After efforts to chase them fail, Duke goes to the mansion again to injure Eli and Taylor, but Jade surprises him and knocks him over the head with a hammer, sending him over the stair railing and onto a table, breaking Duke's leg. She threatens him if he tries to return.
5	5	"There's No Crying in Murder"	David Grossman	Jeff Strauss & Brendan Stephan	September 12, 2019
In 1963, April successfully auditions to sing at a local bar. She makes plans for Beth Ann and Rob to come watch her when she sings, but after Rob gets two tickets to the World Series, Rob declines April's offer. However, Beth Ann pretends to be sick and instead goes to the bar for April's performance. After, they go back to April's apartment. Rob shows up and Beth Ann is forced to hide in the bathroom. April then tells Rob that she is in love with him, but Rob starts yelling at her, saying he will never leave his wife, and he storms out. In 1984, Simone and Tommy get lost on their way to a motel in a bad part of town. Simone asks for directions, but a police officer mistakes her for a prostitute, forcing them to explain their illicit affair and consider a different arrangement. When Naomi finds out Tommy's been leaving the house at all hours of the night, she signs him up for a housekeeping service to water neighbor's plants to keep him busy. When Simone hears this, they start meeting in the empty houses to have sex. However, when Joyce, Simone's neighbor, comes home early one day with Naomi, Simone is forced to call Karl to help her escape unnoticed. Karl drives to their house and crashes into Naomi's car, creating a distraction for Simone to leave. Karl also discovers Simone has been having an affair with Tommy. In 2019, Taylor is out of town for a conference, and meets with her sisters to tell them about her relationship change. Her sisters ask her about how Eli and Jade feel about each other. They also express concern about the possibility that they will start to like each other more than Taylor, and bring up Eli's past addiction to drugs. While Taylor's gone, Eli gets a 24-hour notice to finish his script or Lamar, his agent, will drop him. Jade inspires Eli, who's going through writer's block, but Eli is foggy and distracted, and falls asleep after writing for hours. Unaware of his substance abuse problems, Jade offers Eli pills to make him more energized, which he accepts. After Lamar says the script was the best thing he's ever written, Eli and Jade have sex without Taylor for the first time.
6	6	"Practically Lethal in Every Way"	David Warren	Joe Keenan	September 19, 2019
In 1963, Rob and Beth Ann throw a housewarming party to celebrate unpacking. Beth Ann goes around the neighborhood inviting all her neighbors, including Mary and Ralph Vlasin. Beth Ann describes their encounter to April, who strongly suspects that Ralph is hitting Mary. At the party, Mary and Rob dance, but a jealous Ralph pulls Mary into the study and starts yelling at her. Beth Ann intervenes and tells Ralph to leave, but after he storms out, Mary follows him. Rob and Beth Ann get into an argument about how Rob did nothing to stop Ralph. As a retort, Rob yells at Beth Ann saying that she wasn't a good mother. After Beth Ann finds out their neighbor Sheila overheard their fight, Beth Ann admits that she was the reason their daughter died. In 1984, Simone and Karl go to dinner with Amy to meet Brad's family. After Amy discovers they are getting divorced, she asks them to keep this to themselves as Brad's family is conservative. While at the restaurant, Simone sees Hector, her favorite stylist, who seemingly dropped her as a client for no reason. Karl excuses himself from the table and is apparently hiding out from Brad's family. When Simone goes looking for him, she finds Karl and Hector making out in the men's bathroom, and they return to the table. After Ruby, Brad's mother, starts asking questions about Simone's ex-husbands, an angry Simone tells the entire table that Karl is gay. Then, Karl tells Brad's family about Simone's affair with Tommy. Brad's family is shocked, and the dinner ends abruptly. Back at the mansion, Karl and Simone fight, and Karl angrily admits he was in love with Hector but ended the relationship some time ago. Simone then visits Hector to talk about Karl's relationship with him. In 2019, Eli and Jade admit to Taylor that they had sex, but Taylor doesn't seem to care. Eli, Jade, Taylor, and Lamar go have dinner to discuss the script. After Lamar and Eli keep giving Jade credit for "being Eli's muse", Taylor gets angry and goes into the bathroom. After Jade finds her and asks what's wrong, she tells Jade that she was the one who spent the last two years fixing Eli's life after his severe drug abuse and overdose. Jade, feeling guilty about giving him pills, confronts Eli about not telling her that he was an addict. Eli gives his pills to Jade, but after he agrees to protect Jade no matter what, she gives the pills back.
7	7	"I Found Out What the Secret to Murder Is: Friends. Best Friends."	Elizabeth Allen Rosenbaum	Hannah Schneider	September 26, 2019
In 1963, Rob dumps April after she said she loved him, but she learns that she's pregnant and he's the father. Beth Ann and Sheila discuss telling Rob about her knowing of the affair, but during the discussion, April appears in the driveway of the mansion. Sheila opens the door and pretends to be Beth Ann. Later, Beth Ann plans to tell Rob that she knows about the affair, but she stops herself. A worried Rob asks if she's sick, and Beth Ann then tells him that she has cancer. In 1984, Simone tells Karl that she still wants to divorce him, but that she wants to part amicably. She invites Hector over and he and Karl go on a date. Tommy buys Simone a very expensive brooch; Naomi is alerted about the withdrawal and thinks that Tommy is buying drugs. After learning the real cost of the brooch, Simone attempts to return it to Tommy while he's at track practice. Someone spots Simone but does not recognize her, and informs Naomi they saw Tommy with a suspicious person, leading Naomi to think Tommy is actually dealing drugs. Naomi breaks into Tommy's room to read his journal, but Simone goes to her house to stop her and successfully distracts Naomi by revealing that Karl is gay. Tommy invites Simone to travel to Europe with him. Though Simone initially declines, she agrees to think about it. Karl discovers he has AIDS, but doesn't tell Simone. In 2019, Eli buys cocaine from his former drug dealer as the pills Jade provided are losing their effect. Taylor starts to suspect that something is wrong when he keeps sniffing and wiping his nose. In order to improve their relationship, Taylor invites Eli and Jade to a weekend polyamory retreat. While at a gas station, Eli does cocaine and accidentally spills the powder all over the trunk, which he tries to conceal. After getting to the retreat to find that they are doing trunk inspections, Eli panics and turns the car around. His nose starts bleeding, which prompts Taylor to go to the trunk where she finds the cocaine. They return to the mansion and Taylor demands that Eli go to rehab, but after he refuses, Taylor walks out. She tells Jade to come with her, but Jade stays.
8	8	"Marriages Don't Break Up on Account of Murder – It's Just a Symptom That Something Else Is Wrong"	Lucy Liu	Alexa Junge	October 3, 2019
In 1963, Beth Ann and Sheila visit Sheila's nephew, a doctor who specializes in oncology, to talk about what kind of cancer she should say she has. After they land on epithelioid hemangioendothelioma, she tells Rob that she has six months to live. April misleads Beth Ann and has her drive her to an illegal abortion clinic. While there, Beth Ann becomes worried about April's safety and tells her about the death of her daughter Emily, and that April reminds Beth Ann of her. Convinced that her death would devastate Beth Ann, April agrees to leave without getting the procedure. Beth Ann tells Sheila what happened and considers taking April's child to raise, as Rob loved being a father and Beth Ann couldn't have more children. Sheila chastises Beth Ann and cuts ties with her. April storms into Rob's office and tells Rob that she's pregnant, and Rob responds by proposing to her, saying that his marriage will be over in six months. April calls Beth Ann and tells her the news, when Beth Ann learns what has happened she faints in the middle of the street. In 1984, Simone and Tommy discuss their vacation to Europe, and since he cannot afford the extravagant things Simone has in mind, she suggests that he sell the brooch and find a more creative way to show her that he cares. At a dinner party, a woman approaches Simone in the bathroom, saying she is Karl's doctor's wife and also a nurse in his practice. She tells Simone that Karl has AIDS. After the party, Karl confirms his diagnosis. Simone decides to cancel her trip with Tommy in order to take care of Karl. Upset, Tommy steals a bottle of wine from Simone and drives away in his car, getting in an accident. At the hospital, Naomi finds Tommy has gotten a tattoo of Simone on his leg. In 2019, Taylor and Jade talk about the risk of Eli overdosing on drugs again. Taylor asks Jade to find Eli's passwords so that they can cut the cash flow to his bank account. Taylor explains that he becomes extremely generous when on drugs. Taylor considers calling Eli's father, whom he dislikes, to find out the reason he was using drugs again, but Jade shuts down the idea. Eli buys Jade an expensive car, and when Taylor gets notified that her credit card is maxed out, she goes to the mansion. Taylor becomes suspicious of Jade and tells her to return the car, but Jade refuses. Taylor accuses Jade of being the reason Eli is on drugs, but Jade tells her to leave, then works to turn Eli against Taylor, telling him about Taylor's plans to call his father and cut him off, and plying him with drugs to keep him easygoing. Taylor visits Duke in jail, and in exchange for bailing him out, she asks for information about Jade. Duke tells Taylor that Jade is not who she says she is.
9	9	"I Was Just Wondering What Makes Dames Like You So Deadly"	Dawn Wilkinson	Mary Elizabeth Hamilton	October 10, 2019
In 1963, while at the doctor with April, Beth Ann sees Mary, who has been visibly hurt. Beth Ann goes to Mary's house to check on her, and questions why she stays with Ralph. Mary admits that Ralph has a gun and threatened to shoot her if she leaves. Shaken after their talk, Beth Ann decides to leave Rob and goes to his office to say goodbye, but he isn't there. Before she can go, Rob's secretary Claire tells Beth Ann that Rob has cheated with many women, including Claire. Claire admits that she is the reason Beth Ann's daughter Emily died; Claire went to their house to meet Rob, but after Beth Ann and Emily came home early, Claire fled out the back door and left the gate open, causing Emily to wander into the street and be hit by a car. Rob knows the truth and has been gaslighting Beth Ann into thinking she left the gate open. Overcome with guilt, Claire begs Beth Ann for forgiveness. Beth Ann changes her mind about leaving Rob, and forgives Claire on the condition that their conversation stay between them. On the way home, she buys a gun. In 1984, Naomi spreads the rumor that Simone has been molesting Tommy for years and tells everyone that Karl is gay. This gets Simone and Karl kicked out of their country club. Naomi furiously shows up at the mansion and tells them she will do much worse, as she knows that Karl has contracted AIDS. When the news reaches Amy, she insists that Karl and Simone shouldn't come to the wedding. One day, Simone and Karl find that their house has been graffitied with slurs and Karl's diagnosis, drawing a crowd. Karl gets dizzy and almost faints; Simone pleads for help, but their neighbors are reluctant to go near him due to his disease, and only their gardener is willing to help. At the hospital, Simone sees Naomi and pleads with her to leave Karl out of their feud. Naomi refuses, saying she will continue to ruin them both, but Tommy overhears her and angrily ends his relationship with his mother. An enraged Naomi gets into her car and waits for Simone to come out of the hospital, and when she does, Naomi drives into Simone. In 2019, Jade continues to ply Eli with drugs and exploit his generosity. Eli's agent asks him to come in for a meeting with a potential director for his movie, but it is actually a cover for a meeting with Taylor. She tells Eli the truth about Jade: her name is actually Irene and she has seduced and killed multiple people. Taylor wants Eli to dump Jade and go into rehab, but while he is suspicious, he leaves and continues to blame Taylor. After Jade picks up Eli from the meeting, he questions Jade about her true identity. Jade gets distracted and crashes the car, injuring Eli, then flees the scene. Jade runs away to Duke's, who admits he told Taylor everything, they argue violently and Jade stabs Duke to death. Taylor visits Eli in the hospital. He is unconscious, but the nurse says he left a note for her with one word: "rehab."
10	10	"Kill Me as If It Were the Last Time"	David Warren	Marc Cherry & Curtis Kheel	October 17, 2019
In 1963, Beth Ann tells Rob she has bought a gun that she will keep loaded in the kitchen due to break-ins in the neighborhood, then initiates a scheme with Mary to cause their husbands to kill each other. Mary hides her belongings, then leaves a note for Ralph that she's having an affair with Rob and is leaving to be with him. Before dinner, Beth Ann plies Rob with alcohol and questions him about the day Emily died. Rob continues to deny his role in their daughter's death, encouraging Beth Ann to continue with her scheme. April arrives at the mansion suddenly, having learned the truth about Beth Ann's identity. Ralph arrives with his gun shortly afterwards and argues with Rob, prompting a struggle between the two. In the ensuing chaos, Beth Ann removes the bullets from her gun before tossing it to Rob, ensuring that he's gunned down by Ralph while Beth Ann looks on. A decade later, in 1974, Simone meets Beth Ann, who reveals that Ralph was executed for Rob's murder. April and her daughter Elsie have become like family to Beth Ann, and April has become a singer. The three of them move to New York together so that April can work as an actress on Broadway, with Beth Ann helping to take care of Elsie. In 1984, Tommy saves Simone from his mother, resulting in Naomi being injured. News spreads of Naomi's actions and she is exiled by her society friends. Tommy offers to cancel his trip to Europe to be with Simone as she takes care of Karl, but Simone encourages him to travel and pursue new relationships. Six months later, in 1985, Simone is forced to sell off her art collection to pay for Karl's medical bills after they lose their insurance. Karl starts stealing sleeping pills in an attempt to end his life as his condition worsens. Karl is discovered and Simone discards the pills, despite his pleas that he does not want to suffer a painful death. Seeing an AIDS victim take a turn for the worse convinces Simone to help Karl end his life without pain. The two share a final dance before Simone injects her husband with a fatal dose of medication. Decades later, in 2017, Taylor and Eli meet Simone, who has become a philanthropist active in AIDS research, while Tommy is revealed to have become a successful painter and artist. In 2019, Eli leaves the hospital, and Taylor and Eli agree to sell the mansion and stop seeing other people so they can focus on improving their own relationship once Eli returns from rehab. Back at the mansion, they are startled by the return of Jade, who's desperate for money. Refusing to help her, Jade seemingly flees through the back door and they call the police. When the police arrive it is to inform them that Duke has been murdered. Taylor and Eli tell the police they suspect Jade is the culprit, and fearing for their lives, they rush to pack their belongings and stay in a hotel until Jade is apprehended. Jade emerges from a hiding place in the mansion and stabs Eli, before being killed by Taylor in a struggle. Eli survives, and a few weeks later, they sell the mansion to couple Abby and Andrew and move back into their old condo with Jade's dog Teacup. After Eli and Taylor leave, Abby discovers that Andrew is cheating on her and shoots him, ending the season.

=== Season 2 (2021) ===
No. overall	No. in season	Title	Directed by	Written by	Original release date
11	1	"Secret Beyond the Door"	David Warren	Marc Cherry	June 3, 2021
In 1949 Los Angeles, Alma Filcott is an awkward housewife and wallflower who yearns to be seen. When a member of the exclusive Elysian Park Garden Club, Vonda Van Esen, dies, Alma sees this as an opportunity to join, only to be ridiculed by her next-door neighbor Mrs. Yost. Since the club members are clients of her husband, Dr. Bertram Filcott, a respected veterinarian, she is invited to a fundraiser for the club. At the fundraiser, Alma wears an expensive pin she found in the attic with the label Enid Dolan, February 14, 1945, on it, which club member Grace recognizes as her Aunt Enid's who died on that date. A shaken Alma returns home and finds a box filled with objects labeled with dates and the names of dead people. Meanwhile, Alma's husband Bertram after euthanizing his client Maisie Moran's dog, learns she has no family left and is suffering from cirrhosis. He comes over to her apartment where he euthanizes her. Rita Castillo, the president of the Elysian Park Garden Club, is secretly cheating on her wealthy husband, Carlo, with a struggling actor, Scooter Polarsky. She hires private investigator Vern Loomis to investigate Scooter, suspecting he is cheating on her, which he is, with Alma's daughter Dee. When Rita's husband Carlo tries to catch her with Scooter, he falls down the stairs and has a stroke, but survives.
12	2	"The Woman in the Window"	David Warren	Joe Keenan	June 3, 2021
Carlo has survived the fall but is now in a vegetative state, forcing his spinster daughter Catherine to come in from Texas to take care of him at his home, ruining Rita's plan for Scooter to move in with her. Rita later tries to drown Carlo in the bathtub but is foiled by Catherine. The next morning, Alma goes through Bertram's box of "souvenirs" and goes to Maisie Moran's address, where she finds Maisie dead. When Bertram returns home from work, Alma confronts him and he reveals he is a serial killer; whenever he meets a sick, lonely old person in pain, he euthanizes them against their will out of a warped sense of mercy. The box is his "mementoes." Distraught, Alma goes to the police, but before she can turn Bertram in, Rita tells her she has been nominated to the club. Knowing Bertram's arrest would keep her from joining, Alma goes to her daughter Dee for advice, who tells her to keep it a secret, believing Bertram is having an affair. Later, when Scooter rejects Dee in the middle of rain, Vern gives her a lift to a motel and reveals he knows about her affair. Alma catches Betram preparing to kill himself, leading to an argument. Their suspicious neighbor Mrs. Yost tries to eavesdrop by climbing a trellis to the bedroom window, but Alma accidentally knocks her off the window ledge she is hanging from, causing Mrs. Yost to fall and impale herself on some garden shears.
13	3	"Lady in the Lake"	Jennifer Getzinger	Joshua Michael Stern	June 10, 2021
After burying Mrs. Yost in the yard, Alma devises a plan to hide her death. Alma calls a hotel as Mrs. Yost to make people believe she is on a trip to visit her sister and then drives away in her car wearing her clothes. When they stop for lunch on the way, Alma runs into her prom date Tom Madison who recognizes her, which makes Bertram jealous. They later drive Mrs. Yost's car into a lake hoping someone will find it and assume she got lost in the woods. Meanwhile, Catherine discovers that Rita is having an affair and seeks to prove it so Carlo will disinherit Rita. Catherine then explains that she almost married a gold-digger herself before Carlo exposed him and put a codicil on his will in case she got with a man he did not approve. With this information Rita orders Scooter to seduce Catherine so she can be disinherited, but they are interrupted by Dee who learned about Rita's affair with Scooter through Vern. As a result, both women break up with Scooter.
14	4	"Scene of the Crime"	Eva Longoria	Hannah Schneider	June 17, 2021
Rita takes everything away from Scooter now that they are broken up, so he reluctantly agrees to seduce Catherine who is smitten by him, but Carlo knows he is Rita's paramour. Dee goes on a date with Vern, which is his first date since the War. During the date he is attacked by his client's ex-husband as revenge but saved by the police. Vern reveals to Dee he hasn't been with a woman since his fiancée left him due to scars he received fighting on the Western Front. Alma gets a call from Grace who reveals she has been nominated for the club and the members will be arriving at the Filcotts' later that day. Desperate to impress the ladies of the Club, Alma steals various expensive dresses and decor from Mrs. Yost's house, including a priceless Parisian painting, to decorate her home. The police stop by and ask her about Mrs. Yost, but Alma feigns ignorance. The party goes well and the club plans on making Alma the new member. Though, Rita is at first unimpressed with Alma's middle-class status, she secretly envies her for being in a happy marriage and plans to add her until she learns Alma is Dee's mother.
15	5	"They Made Me a Killer"	Larry Shaw	Mary Elizabeth Hamilton	June 24, 2021
In a flashback, it is revealed when Bertram was six, his mother was terminally ill but could not bear the pain, so she asked Bertram to help her by killing her. Ever since then he has seen euthanizing as a warped way of helping people. In the present, realizing that what he has done is ruining his marriage he decides to talk to Father Tim, the only person he told the truth about his mother's death to. Father Tim is horrified to learn that Bertram killed 26 people and tells him that what he is doing is selfish and must stop. Meanwhile, Alma receives a telegram saying she is in the club, but when she arrives at their brunch learns Rita strong-armed the club into rejecting her, leaving Alma humiliated in front of the whole club. Rita also gets Dee fired from her job and Scooter gets closer to Catherine, though Carlo tries to warn her about him, but fails. When Dee reveals to Alma that Rita fired her for sleeping with Scooter, Alma sees this as leverage against Rita. She goes to Rita's home and tries blackmailing her about Scooter, but Rita tells her that thanks to the telegram no one will believe her and threatens to ruin her family if she tries anything else.
16	6	"Dangerous Intruder"	Larry Shaw	Stacey Harman	July 1, 2021
Alma has come up with a revenge plan against Rita. Alma tells Bertram he should kill Carlo to relieve him of his suffering, but he refuses as he has come to realize what he is doing is wrong. Alma later manipulates him into believing that Carlo beats Rita and killing him will relieve both Rita and Carlo of suffering. They break into Carlo's house, where Bertram kills him and Alma plants evidence in Rita's purse behind his back. They are nearly caught as Catherine and Scooter have sex on the downstairs coach while Vern photographs them through the window but get away. The next day after Carlo is found dead, Alma gives Catherine an anonymous phone call gaslighting her into thinking Rita killed Carlo. Meanwhile, Dee who has officially started a relationship with Vern learns she is pregnant with Scooter's baby. With no other options Vern proposes to her and she happily says yes.
17	7	"The Woman in Question"	Joanna Kerns	Curtis Kheel	July 8, 2021
Rita's life as a rich widow is short-lived as Catherine calls the police who find the poison in Carlo's blood through an autopsy and during a search find the evidence Alma planted on Rita. She is arrested for murder and Alma spreads the word about her affair with Scooter, further ruining her status. While in jail, Rita hires Vern to prove she is innocent and assigns her maid Isabel, revealed to be her cousin and accomplice, to blackmail Catherine with the pictures Vern took of her. However, Catherine overhears Rita and Isabel's phone call leading her to find letters from between the two revealing they killed a man. Isabel visits Rita in jail telling her she is done with her and leaving LA. However, while staying at a motel she notices Alma in the photo of Catherine from the night Carlo died. Bertram is outraged that Alma framed Rita, but Alma is happy as she is finally brought into the Elysian Park Garden Club. Dee has Vern over for dinner to introduce him to her parents, but it fails when Bertram reveals Vern works for Rita and Vern reveals Dee is pregnant with Scooter's child.
18	8	"Murder, My Sweet"	David Warren	Austin Guzman	July 15, 2021
Alma is finally brought into the Elysian Park Garden Club, but her position is put in jeopardy when Isabel starts blackmailing the Filcotts with the photos of them in Carlo's house. Eventually, the Filcotts give Isabel $20,000, but she refuses to give them the photos, so Alma kills her with the same chemical used by Bertram but without a sedative, causing her to die in agony. Horrified at what his wife did, he forges a suicide note, stating that Isabel killed Carlo and framed Rita, but killed herself out of guilt. Catherine brings Scooter in to live with her, only for her butler, Otto, to expose him as Rita's paramour. An outraged Catherine confronts Scooter to testify against Rita for her. While Rita is sitting in jail, a series of flashbacks reveal she was once married to a man named Harry Jerowski who physically abused her. After Harry broke Rita's arm, Isabel shot him, and they left him for dead. With no other options, Rita sold her body, which led her to Carlo, a match engineered by Isabel. After Rita and Carlo are married, Isabel moves in under the condition that she become Rita and Carlo's maid, which she has never forgiven Rita for. Meanwhile, the police tell Dee they suspect Mrs. Yost has been murdered. Dee begins to suspect her parents when Mrs. Yost's nephew reveals the story her parents told her is a lie and Mrs. Yost's house has been robbed. Realizing her mother stole from Mrs. Yost, Dee returns the stolen items, but then finds Mrs. Yost's body in the yard. Horrified, she flees to elope with Vern.
19	9	"The Unguarded Moment"	Melanie Mayron	Joe Keenan	July 22, 2021
Alma is finally a member of the Elysian Park Garden Club and now seeks to become president of the club, but because Joan is running, she fears she has no chances of winning. Through Joan's former maid, she learns she is having an affair, leading Alma to discover Joan is having an affair with Grace. With this knowledge she blackmails Joan into dropping out of the race, allowing Alma to become president unopposed. Dee confronts Alma about Mrs. Yost's death; Alma lies that Bertram was cheating on her with Mrs. Yost and when he ended the affair, she attacked them, and he accidentally killed her in self-defense. Bertram has taken up drinking and has come to rue everything he has done. After speaking with Dee, he decides to make things right. Vern, suspicious of Isabel's death, decides to investigate, which leads him to the Filcotts and a confrontation with Alma. Meanwhile, Rita is released from jail expecting to inherit Carlo's estate, only to learn Catherine annulled her marriage to Carlo, because Rita's first husband Harry is still alive and still legally married to her. Now homeless, Rita goes to Scooter for help. Out of pity he brings her money and clothes behind Catherine's back, but they are caught by Catherine who in a blind rage shoots them, injuring Scooter and a passing-by Bertram.
20	10	"The Lady Confesses"	David Warren	Joe Keenan	July 29, 2021
After Vern confronts her about Isabel's death, Alma visits Bertram in the hospital and tells him Vern knows, but Bertram refuses to kill Vern. Alma then finds Scooter in the hospital recovering, where she tells him Dee is pregnant with his child. Dee is arrested as the police found her fingerprints on Mrs. Yost's stolen goods, but Vern gets her out. Dee then runs into Scooter who reveals Alma told him about the baby. Dee confronts her mother horrified to learn she was planning on killing Vern and framing Scooter. At Alma's inauguration for club president, Rita confronts Alma as Carlo's killer in the back alley. Alma refuses to admit to Carlo's murder, but accidentally confesses to Isabel's by stating details of her death the press did not release. Rita intends to expose Alma at her inauguration, but Alma brutally kills her with a screwdriver. During the inauguration, Alma is exposed by the blood on her stole and a chef finding Rita's body. Alma flees home where she reveals Rita's death to Bertram, who in return tells her he confessed to all their crimes to Vern and wants the two of them to commit suicide together. Alma lets Bertram kill himself alone, and adds his glasses with his death date tagged to his collection of victim ‘souvenirs’. Alma is arrested, and found guilty of multiple homicides. As she arrives at the courthouse for sentencing, she views the newspaper headlines and the crowd as proof of attention being paid at long last to her.

== Production ==
=== Development ===
On September 24, 2018, it was announced that CBS All Access had given the production a straight-to-series order. The series was created by Marc Cherry who was also expected to executive produce alongside Brian Grazer, Francie Calfo, Michael Hanel, and Mindy Schultheis. Production companies involved with the series were slated to consist of Imagine Entertainment and CBS Television Studios. On December 10, 2018, it was reported that the series would receive $8.4 million in tax credits from the state of California.

Cherry stated at the 2019 Television Critics Association that there will be "three deaths at the end of the series, and they will all be committed by women. But it's not necessarily the three women on this stage. The victims are not necessarily the men on this stage, and interesting enough, not one person will be killed because of infidelity. Infidelity is just the starting point for these journeys of self‑discovery."

On October 16, 2019, the day before the season 1 finale, it was announced that the series was renewed for a second season that would focus on a new set of characters. Julie McNamara, CBS All Access' EVP of Original Content, stated that, "Under the creative direction of Marc Cherry and the incredible performances of the cast, the series has become one of our most streamed original series. We look forward to bringing fans even more of this wonderfully soapy dramedy in its second season and can't wait to see what themes Marc explores next."

On November 11, 2020, it was reported that the second season had been suspended production after positive COVID-19 tests of production team members. On December 15, 2021, Paramount+ renewed the series for a third season. On July 1, 2022, the third season was reported scrapped just before production was set to begin.

=== Casting ===
In February 2019, it was announced that Ginnifer Goodwin and Lucy Liu had been cast in starring roles. On February 27, 2019, it was reported that Reid Scott had joined the cast. On March 4, 2019, it was announced that Sam Jaeger had joined the cast. On March 7, 2019, it was announced that Alexandra Daddario had joined the cast. On March 11, 2019, Kirby Howell-Baptiste had been cast. On March 19, 2019, Sadie Calvano joined cast as a series regular. On April 5, 2019, Katie Finneran has been cast in a recurring role. On April 17, 2019, Adam Ferrara joined the cast in a recurring capacity. On August 7, 2019, Li Jun Li was cast in a recurring role. In October 2020, Allison Tolman, Nick Frost, Lana Parrilla, B.K. Cannon, Jordane Christie, Matthew Daddario, Veronica Falcón were cast to star for the second season. In November 2020, Virginia Williams, Jessica Phillips, Eileen Galindo, Cynthia Quiles, and Kerry O'Malley joined the cast in recurring roles for the second season. On April 14, 2021, Rachel Bay Jones was cast in a recurring role for the second season.

== Release ==
Why Women Kill premiered on August 15, 2019, on CBS All Access and its first season consisted of 10 episodes. The second season premiered on June 3, 2021, on Paramount+ and it consisted of 10 episodes.

== Why Women Kill: Truth, Lies and Labels ==
Why Women Kill: Truth, Lies and Labels
- Genre: True crime
- Language: English

Cast and voices
- Hosted by: Tori Telfer

Production
- Length: 22–25 minutes

Publication
- No. of seasons: 1
- No. of episodes: 6
- Original release: September 20 – October 25, 2019
- Provider: Apple Podcasts; Google Podcasts; Spotify; Stitcher Radio
- Updates: Weekly, every Friday

Related
- Related shows: Why Women Kill

On September 20, 2019, CBS All Access released the first episode of a six episode podcast, entitled Why Women Kill: Truth, Lies and Labels, to help advertise for Why Women Kill. The final episode was released on October 25. Each episode, released weekly on Friday, shares the details of a woman who became a murderer. The podcast is available on Apple Podcasts, Google Podcasts, Spotify, and Stitcher Radio. Tori Telfer, a true crime writer, narrates each episode.

No.	Title	Topic	Length min:sec	Original release date
1	"The Black Widow"	Belle Gunness	22:56	September 20, 2019
2	"The Woman Who Snapped"	Lizzie Borden	22:13	September 27, 2019
3	"The Angel of Death"	Amy Archer-Gilligan	22:36	October 4, 2019
4	"The Jealous Lover"	Mary Pearcey	24:52	October 11, 2019
5	"The Bonnie"	Raymond Fernandez and Martha Beck	22:50	October 18, 2019
6	"The Bloodthirsty Babe"	Elizabeth Báthory	24:04	October 25, 2019

== Reception ==
On review aggregator Rotten Tomatoes, the first season holds an approval rating of 67% based on 27 reviews, with an average rating of 7.6/10. The website's critical consensus reads, "Though Why Women Kill falls short of its ambitious premise, fans of Marc Cherry and his impressive cast will find much to like in its darkly soapy and stylish delights." On Metacritic, it has a weighted average score of 63 out of 100, based on 16 critics, indicating "generally favorable reviews".

While the aesthetic of the series received praise, critics found that Why Women Kill lacked character development. Robyn Bahr of The Hollywood Reporter wrote, "We're supposed to marvel at the changing roles of women over time, but it's hard to get there, intellectually, when none of the three leads feels like a semblance of a real person. Instead, Why Women Kill comes off as an ungainly fantasy of women's emotional lives, where the threat of infidelity could be the only fuel of marital unhappiness." Vulture reviewer Angelica Jade Bastién agreed with the focus on aesthetics more than plot, stating, "Why Women Kill is akin to an overly complicated craft cocktail, boasting an intriguing brightness, namely in the form of Goodwin's performance, but lacking balance in its competing flavors. It's full of baffling tonal and narrative decisions that undermine what does work about the show—a handful of the performances, the over-the-top, nearly camp production design, the costuming—and undercuts its dramatic potential with broad, nearly slapstick humor that distances us from the characters rather than illuminating who they are."

However, Greg Wheeler of 'The Review Geek' changed his view as the series progressed, and gave this favourable summary: 'Why Women Kill is one of those shows that's hurt by early reviews. I've said it many times before that a full season review rating should be reserved for just that – a full season. When it comes to this wonderful drama, this is a perfect example against judging a show by the first few episodes. What began as an artistic trio of stories dancing around a singular idea, quickly blossomed into one of the best shows of the year. Between the strong writing and well paced segments, right across to the different themes and ideas explored each episode, Why Women Kill may just be one of my favourite shows of the year, balancing the artistic juxtapositions and smart editing with the perfect finale to balance things out.'

On Rotten Tomatoes, the second season has an approval rating of 86% based on 7 reviews, with an average rating of 7.5/10.
