= The Package (2018 film) =

- Official release poster
- Directed by: Jake Szymanski
- Written by: Kevin Burrows; Matt Mider
- Produced by: Ben Stiller; Nicky Weinstock; Blake Anderson; Adam Devine; Anders Holm; Kyle Newacheck; Ross Dinerstein
- Starring: Daniel Doheny; Geraldine Viswanathan; Sadie Calvano; Luke Spencer Roberts; Eduardo Franco
- Cinematography: Hillary Spera
- Edited by: Christian Hoffman
- Music by: Adam Schiff
- Production companies: Red Hour Productions; Campfire; Mail Order Company
- Distributed by: Netflix
- Release date: August 10, 2018 (United States)
- Running time: 94 minutes
- Country: United States
- Language: English

The Package is a 2018 American teen comedy film directed by Jake Szymanski from a screenplay by Kevin Burrows and Matt Mider. The film stars Daniel Doheny, Sadie Calvano, Geraldine Viswanathan, Luke Spencer Roberts, and Eduardo Franco.

== Plot ==
Returning home from Germany, Sean Floyd plans to go to the woods for spring break with his friends Jeremy Abelar and Donnie. Unbeknownst to Sean or Donnie, Jeremy has invited his twin sister, Becky, who recently broke up with her boyfriend Chad, and her friend Sarah, who Donnie used to date.

Donnie and Jeremy encourage Sean to make a move on Becky, whom he has a crush on. Jeremy assures the group that the trip is safe, while the rest worry as it took them 6 hours to reach their destination.

Arriving at the campsite, Sean attempts to make a move on Becky but is interrupted by Donnie, who takes him along to pester a peeing Jeremy. Because of them startling him while he's playing with a knife, Jeremy accidentally cuts off his own penis.

Sean takes everyone's phones to find an area with service and calls 9-1-1. He also angrily texts Chad from Becky's phone, before accidentally losing all the phones. Paramedics arrive in a helicopter, and Sean gives them a cooler containing Jeremy's penis.

After the paramedics leave, the group finds the penis in another cooler and realize that Sean gave the paramedics the wrong one. At the hospital, the nurse reveals the dilemma to Jeremy, who is distraught due to the fact that he does not have any faith in the group.

Finding a ranger station, the group goes inside. A startled Becky throws the cooler at a rattlesnake. The penis flies out of it and is bitten by the rattlesnake. In order to prevent the penis from being rendered obsolete, Sean reluctantly volunteers to suck out the venom. Sarah spots a drone and chases it, but falls into the water at the bottom of a ravine.

Everyone follows, they swim across the ravine and find the drone's owner, a foul-mouthed 11-year-old boy camping with his dad. He tries to coerce Sarah and Becky in exchange for the keys to his dad's boat. Becky and Sean scare him by talking about penises being cut off, allowing the group to steal the boat, although they are attacked by his dad, who thinks they molested his son.

Finding their car, they stop at the gas station where Jeremy had bought booze using his fake soldier ID. The clerk cleans the penis as an act of patriotism. Afterwards, seeing Donnie's high school ID he realizes they lied about being soldiers – he chases their car as they escape and hits Donnie in the shoulder with an arrow through his headboard.

Reaching the hospital, they give the penis to the doctors. After the surgery, they go inside the recovery room to find a different man named Redneck Reginald, and realize Jeremy's penis was put on Reginald instead.

In a heated argument, Donnie tells Becky about Sean texting Chad from her phone. She calls Chad to pick her up, and Sean and Donnie visit Reginald, who is now awake. They explain the situation and Reginald tells them how his girlfriend, Sheryl cut off his penis as revenge for him cheating with her sister.

Sean and Donnie go get Reginald's penis, which just arrived, with the hopes of attaching it to Jeremy. However, Sheryl suddenly comes to visit and ends up cutting it off again. Sean and Donnie fight her and retrieve Jeremy's penis. Meeting up with Becky and Sarah, Sean apologizes to Becky, telling her she shouldn't be with someone who cheated on her. She accepts the apology and the four of them leave together.

Realizing the hospital had likely registered Jeremy under the name on his fake ID, they call the original hospital and finally deliver Jeremy's penis. While Jeremy is in surgery, Donnie and Sarah reconcile and decide to give their relationship another chance. Becky and Sean apologize to each other and start a relationship.

When Sean is about to return to Germany, Jeremy is released from the hospital and introduces his girlfriend, Kendall Jenners, whom everyone believed was fake. And, with everyone goading them, Becky and Sean share a long kiss.

== Cast ==
- Daniel Doheny as Sean Floyd
- Geraldine Viswanathan as Becky Abelar
- Sadie Calvano as Sarah
- Luke Spencer Roberts as Donnie
- Eduardo Franco as Jeremy Abelar
- Alexander Calvert as Chad
- Blake Anderson as Redneck Reginald
- Sugar Lyn Beard as Sheryl
- Mary Holland as Triage Nurse Darlene
- Christian Convery as Jake Floyd
- Jake Szymanski as Wastewater Worker
- Veena Sood as Mrs. Abelar
- Michael Eklund as Gas Station clerk
- Jade Falcon as Kendall Jenners
- Gary Jones as Dr. Trimble
- Chance Hurstfield as Aiden

== Production ==
In January 2017, it was reported that Netflix had won a bidding war for the spec script for the film, then titled Eggplant Emoji, by Kevin Burrows and Matt Mider. In July 2017, it was announced that Jake Szymanski would direct, and in August 2017, Daniel Doheny, Sadie Calvano, Geraldine Viswanathan, Luke Spencer Roberts, and Eduardo Franco joined the cast. The film was later re-titled The Package.

== Release and reception ==
The Package was released on August 10, 2018 on Netflix.

On review aggregator Rotten Tomatoes, the film holds an approval rating of 37% based on 19 reviews, with an average rating of 5/10. The website's critics consensus reads, "The Package learns the hard way that a penis joke does not make a movie."
