= Bad Day (2026 film) =

American action comedy film

- Release poster
- Directed by: Jake Szymanski
- Written by: Laura Solon
- Produced by: Beau Bauman
- Starring: Cameron Diaz; Danielle Brooks; Rhenzy Feliz; John Higgins; Mark Duplass; Jessica Belkin; Rob Corddry; Ayden Mayeri; Ben Schwartz; Ed O'Neill
- Music by: Pinar Toprak
- Production company: Good One Productions
- Distributed by: Netflix
- Release date: December 11, 2026
- Country: United States
- Language: English

Bad Day is an upcoming American action comedy film directed by Jake Szymanski, written by Laura Solon and starring Cameron Diaz. It is set to be released by Netflix on December 11, 2026.

== Premise ==
A single mom fights to keep one small promise to her daughter on the absolute worst day of her life where her car gets towed, a mishap happens when she took her father to his dialysis, and her card is declined at the bank where her demands for $30 causes the bank to think that she is robbing them.

== Cast ==
- Cameron Diaz as Joy
- Ed O'Neill as Joy's father
- Danielle Brooks as a cop
- John Higgins as a cop
- Rhenzy Feliz
- Mark Duplass
- Ben Schwartz
- Rob Corddry as a bank manager
- Jessica Belkin as Joy's teenage daughter
- Ayden Mayeri
- Sam Richardson
- K Callan
- Beck Bennett
- Retta
- Sherry Cola
- P.J. Byrne
- Edi Patterson
- Emma Pearson

== Production ==
It July 2025, it was announced that Cameron Diaz would star in Bad Day, written by Laura Solon and to be directed by Jake Szymanski; Netflix would distribute the film. In September 2025, Ed O'Neill, Danielle Brooks, John Higgins, Rhenzy Feliz, Jessica Belkin, and Emma Pearson joined the cast. In October, Sam Richardson, Ben Schwartz, Rob Corddry and more rounded out the cast. Other cast members include Beck Bennett, Retta, Sherry Cola, P.J. Byrne, and Edi Patterson.

Principal photography took place in New Jersey in September 2025, with filming locations including Plainfield, East Windsor, Bloomfield and Perth Amboy, amongst others.

== Release ==
Bad Day will release on Netflix on December 11, 2026.
