= Orlando Bloom =

English actor (born 1977)

- Bloom in 2026
- Born: Orlando Jonathan Blanchard Copeland Bloom; 13 January 1977 (age 49); Canterbury, Kent, England
- Education: Guildhall School of Music and Drama (BA)
- Occupation: Actor
- Years active: 1994–present
- Spouse: Miranda Kerr (m. 2010; div. 2013)
- Partner: Katy Perry (2016–2025)
- Children: 2

Orlando Jonathan Blanchard Copeland Bloom (born 13 January 1977) is an English actor. He made his breakthrough as the character Legolas in The Lord of the Rings film series (2001–03), earning him three Actors Award nominations, winning once. He reprised his role in The Hobbit film series (2013–14). Considered by some to be the Errol Flynn of his time, he gained further notice appearing in epic fantasy, historical, and adventure films, including as Will Turner in the Pirates of the Caribbean film series (2003–2007, 2017), Paris in Troy (2004), Balian de Ibelin in Kingdom of Heaven (2005), and the Duke of Buckingham in The Three Musketeers (2011).

Bloom appeared in Hollywood films such as the war film Black Hawk Down (2001), the Australian Western Ned Kelly (2003), the romantic comedy Elizabethtown (2005), and New York, I Love You (2007). In 2020, he gained acclaim for the Afghanistan war drama film The Outpost (2020). He also starred in the Amazon Prime Video series Carnival Row (2019–2023).

Bloom made his professional stage debut in In Celebration at the Duke of York's Theatre in the West End in 2007 and starred in a Broadway adaptation of William Shakespeare's Romeo and Juliet in 2013. He returned to the theatre in a West End revival of Tracy Letts' Killer Joe in 2018. In 2009, Bloom was named a UNICEF Goodwill Ambassador. In 2015, he received the BAFTA Britannia Humanitarian Award.

== Early life ==
Bloom was born to Sonia Bloom (née Copeland) on 13 January 1977 in Canterbury, Kent, and was named after the 16th-century English composer Orlando Gibbons. He has an older sister, Samantha Bloom. Bloom initially believed that his biological father was his mother's husband, the South African-born anti-apartheid novelist Harry Bloom, who died when Bloom was four years old. However, when he was thirteen, Bloom's mother revealed to him that his biological father was actually Colin Stone, Harry Bloom's student and family friend. Stone, the principal of the Concorde International language school, became Orlando Bloom's legal guardian after Harry Bloom's death. Bloom is a cousin of photographer Sebastian Copeland.

Bloom was brought up in the Church of England. He attended St Peter's Methodist Primary School, then the junior school of The King's School before proceeding to St Edmund's School Canterbury. Bloom was discovered to be dyslexic, and was encouraged by his mother to take art and drama classes. After being spurred into action following his school prize submission to panto actor Richard Sieben in 1992, in 1993, he moved to London to follow a two-year A-Level course in Drama, Photography and Sculpture at Fine Arts College, Hampstead. He then joined the National Youth Theatre, spending two seasons there and earning a scholarship to train at the British American Drama Academy. Bloom began acting professionally with television roles in episodes of Casualty and Midsomer Murders, and subsequently made his film debut in Wilde (released in 1997), opposite Stephen Fry. After the filming in 1996, he went to the Guildhall School of Music and Drama in London, where he obtained a Bachelor of Arts degree in acting in 1999.

== Career ==
Bloom's first appearance on the screen was in a small role, as a rent boy, in the 1997 film Wilde. Two days after graduating from Guildhall in 1999, he was cast in his first major role, playing Legolas in The Lord of the Rings film trilogy (2001–2003). He had originally auditioned for the part of Faramir, who does not appear until the second movie, but the director, Peter Jackson, cast him as Legolas instead. While shooting a scene, he broke a rib after falling off a horse, but eventually recovered and continued shooting. At the same time, Bloom also played a brief role in Ridley Scott's war film Black Hawk Down as PFC Todd Blackburn. In 2002, he was chosen as one of the Teen People "25 Hottest Stars Under 25", despite him having turned 25, and was named People's hottest Hollywood bachelor in the magazine's 2004 list. All members of the cast of the Rings films were nominated for Best Ensemble Acting at the Screen Actors Guild Awards for three years in a row, finally winning in 2003 for the third film, The Lord of the Rings: The Return of the King. Bloom has also won other awards, including European Film Awards, Hollywood Festival Award, Empire Awards and Teen Choice Awards, and has been nominated for many others. Most of Bloom's box office successes have been as part of an ensemble cast.

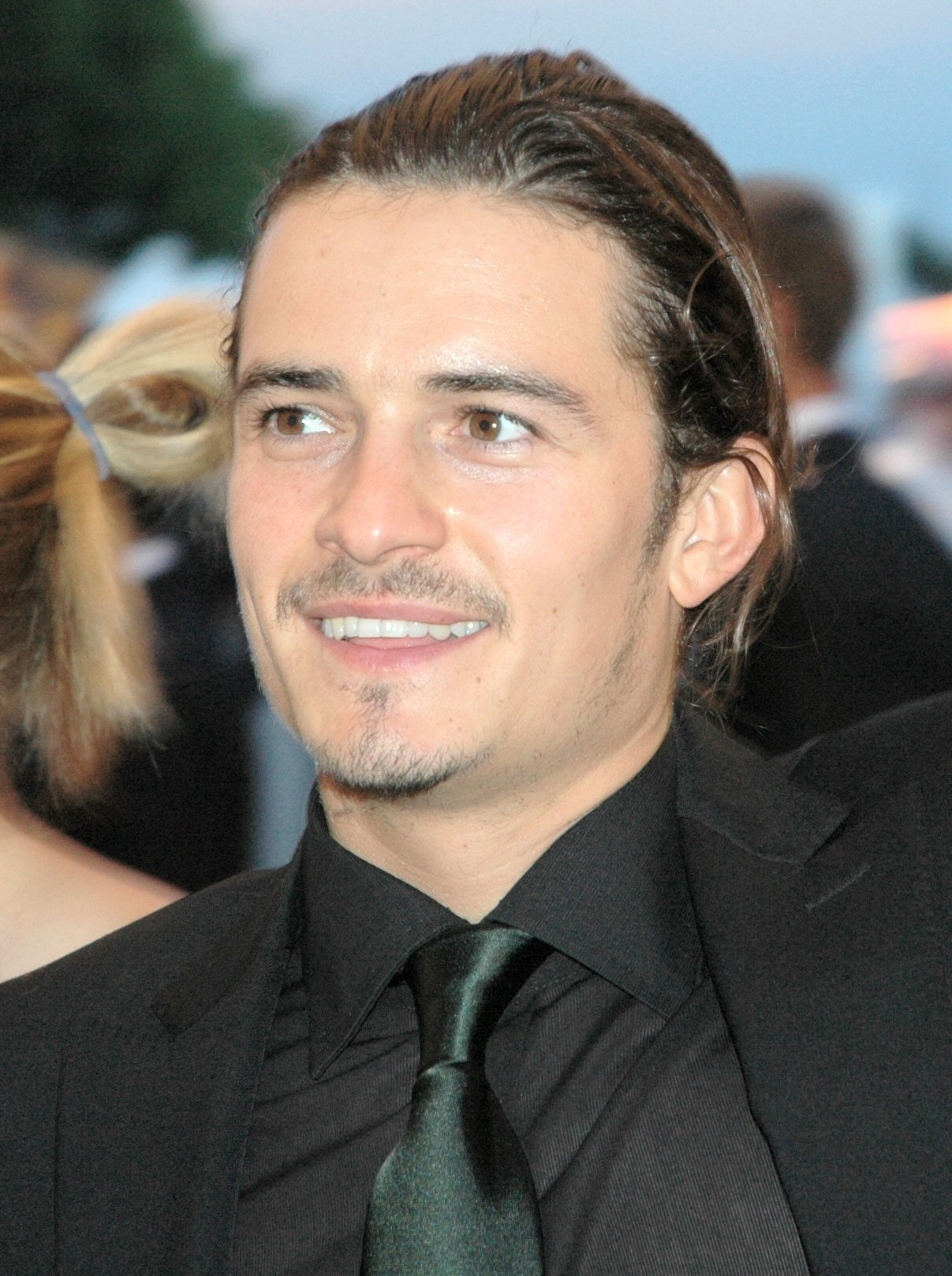
Bloom at the 2005 Venice Film Festival

Bloom next starred opposite Keira Knightley and Johnny Depp in Pirates of the Caribbean: The Curse of the Black Pearl, which was a blockbuster hit during the summer of 2003. After the success of Pirates, Bloom next took to the screen as Paris, the prince of Troy, in the 2004 spring blockbuster Troy opposite Brad Pitt, Eric Bana and Peter O'Toole. He subsequently played the lead roles in Ridley Scott's Kingdom of Heaven and Cameron Crowe's Elizabethtown, both released in 2005, and starred in the 2006 film Haven, for which he also served as executive producer. In 2006, Bloom was one of the guest stars in the sitcom Extras, in which he portrayed an exaggeratedly arrogant, narcissistic version of himself who had a great loathing for Johnny Depp (his co-star in Pirates of the Caribbean). Bloom pushed for Extras to go further by making his persona very unlikable, and contributed to the gag about him admiring Depp out of sheer jealousy because Depp was far more talented than he was, not to mention rated higher than him on the 'top hottest' charts. In 2004, the second and third films of the Pirates of the Caribbean series were conceived, with screenwriters Ted Elliott and Terry Rossio developing a story arc that would span both sequels, in which Bloom reprised his role as Will Turner. Filming for the projects took place in 2005; Pirates of the Caribbean: Dead Man's Chest released in July 2006, with the worldwide collections of $1.066 billion, becoming the biggest financial hit of Bloom's career. The third installment in the series, Pirates of the Caribbean: At World's End, was released in May, the following year. Afterwards, Bloom repeatedly stated that he was done with the Pirates series, noting that there was closure for his character in At World's End. By 2010, both Bloom and Keira Knightley were quoted as saying they wanted to move on from the franchise.

In 2006, Bloom played as Auguste Berneau in 2006 television documentary film The Armenian Genocide, broadcast by PBS. That same year, Bloom was the most searched male on Google News. As of May 2007, Bloom has appeared in four of the top 15 highest-grossing films of all time. Bloom, who had intended to become a stage actor after graduating from the Guildhall School of Music and Drama, had stated that he would like to leave films for a time and instead appear in stage roles, and is "avidly looking for the right sort of material that [he] can do something with" and to go "back to basics." During the summer of 2007, he appeared in a London revival of In Celebration, a play by David Storey. His character was one of three brothers returning home for their parents' 40th wedding anniversary. On 24 August 2007 he made his first ever TV commercial appearance on late-night Japanese TV, promoting the Uno brand of cosmetics maker Shiseido. A "one night only", 2-minute version of the Sci-Fi themed commercial kicked off the product's marketing campaign. In 2008 he signed on to play a small role in the British film An Education but dropped out to take the lead in Johnnie To's film Red Circle. Also in 2009, he was one of many stars to appear in New York, I Love You, which contained 12 short films in one.

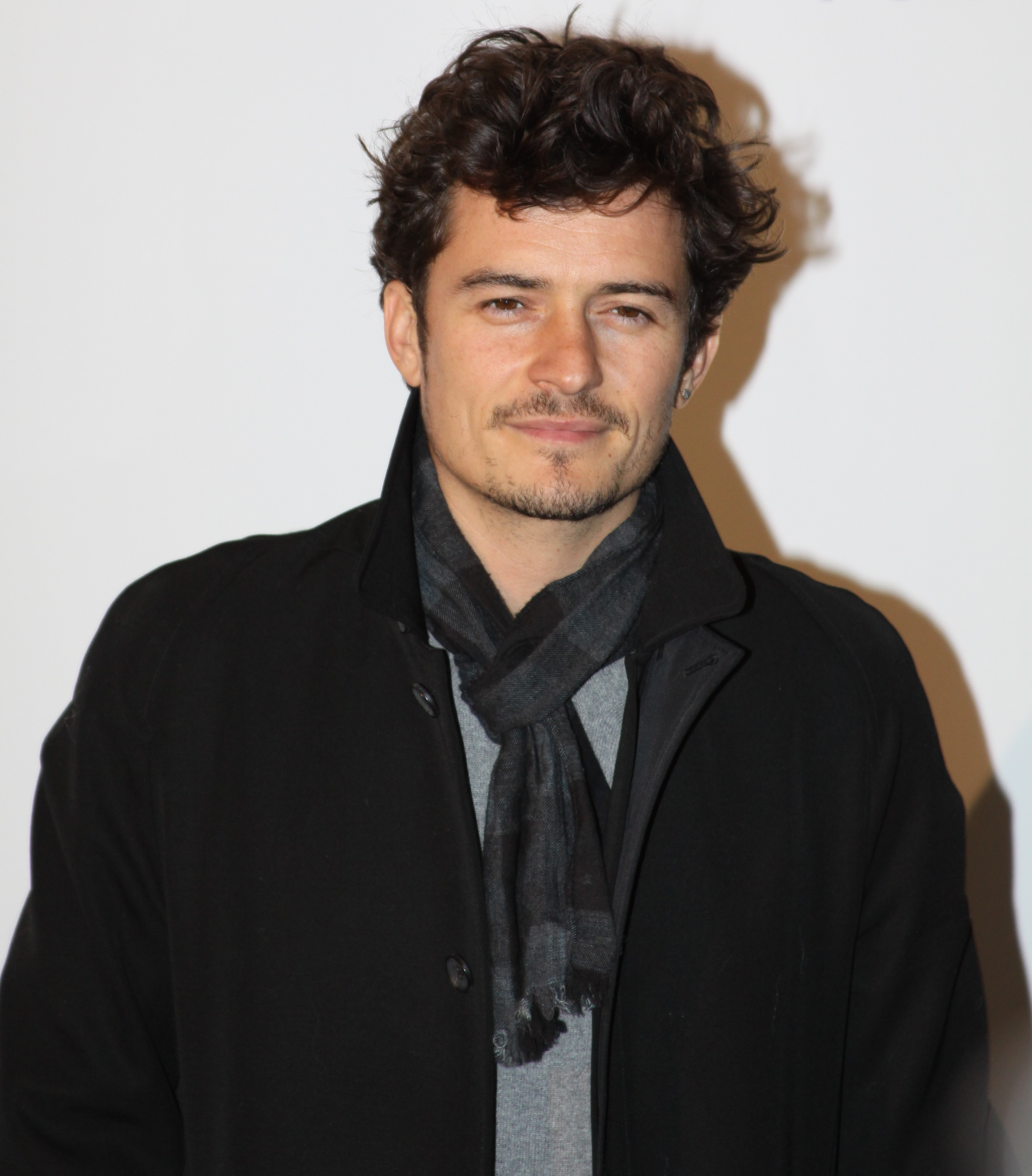
Bloom at the 2010 Cinema for Peace gala in Berlin, Germany

In 2011, Bloom appeared in The Three Musketeers opposite Milla Jovovich, Logan Lerman, Matthew Macfadyen, Ray Stevenson, Luke Evans, Juno Temple and Christoph Waltz. Bloom also reprised his role as Legolas in parts two and three of The Hobbit, Peter Jackson's three-part prequel to The Lord of the Rings trilogy.

He made his Broadway stage debut as Romeo in Romeo and Juliet in August 2013 at the Richard Rodgers Theatre. The New York Times theatre critic Ben Brantley described Bloom's performance as "a first-rate Broadway debut" in the title role: "For once, we have a Romeo who evolves substantively, from a posturing youth in love with love, to a man who discovers the startling revelation of real love, with a last-act descent into bilious, bitter anger that verges on madness." Bloom made statements about returning to the Pirates franchise as early as October 2011, and there were discussions for him to reprise his role as Will Turner by 2014. Although it was announced as a supporting role, Bloom ultimately made a cameo appearance in the fifth film, Pirates of the Caribbean: Dead Men Tell No Tales, which was released in May 2017.

Bloom starred in the Trafalgar Studios production of Killer Joe in 2018. Bloom is currently starring in the Amazon Prime TV show Carnival Row, which was filming its second season in Prague before temporarily postponing production due to COVID-19. Together with a number of his Lord of the Rings co-stars (plus writer Philippa Boyens and director Peter Jackson), on 1 June 2020 he joined Josh Gad's YouTube series Reunited Apart which reunites the cast of popular movies through video-conferencing, and promotes donations to non-profit charities.

In July 2020, Bloom starred in the war film The Outpost in which he portrayed the character of captain Benjamin Keating. In 2023, he played Danny Moore, a Nissan marketing executive in the sports film Gran Turismo based on the true story of Jann Mardenborough.

In 2024, Orlando Bloom starred in and produced the boxing film The Cut, directed by Sean Ellis. To authentically portray his character, Bloom underwent a significant physical transformation, losing 35 pounds to depict a boxer's intense weight-cutting process. He described the film as focusing on "the battle to lose weight," offering a unique perspective on the challenges athletes face.

== Personal life ==
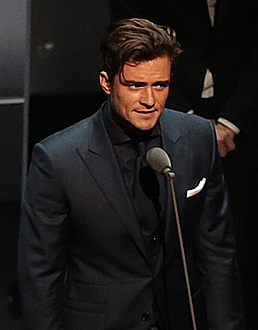
Bloom at the 2015 British Fashion Awards

Bloom has said that he tries "not to exclude himself from real life as much as possible." During filming in Morocco for Kingdom of Heaven, Bloom rescued and adopted a dog, Sidi (a black Saluki mix with a white mark on his chest).

In 2004, he became a full member of SGI-UK (the UK branch of Soka Gakkai International), a lay Buddhist association affiliated with the teachings of Nichiren.

Bloom has also been a part of Global Green, an environmental company, since the early 2000s. As part of his environmental involvement, he has renovated his London home to use solar panels, incorporate recycled materials, and has used energy efficient lightbulbs.

Involved in modelling work, in 2002 he starred opposite English actress Kate Beckinsale in a Gap television advertisement directed by Cameron Crowe.

Bloom has a tattoo of the Elvish word "nine" on his right wrist, written in fictional Tengwar Elvish script, a reference to his involvement in The Lord of the Rings as one of the nine members of the Fellowship of the Ring. The other actors of "The Fellowship" (Sean Astin, Sean Bean, Billy Boyd, Ian McKellen, Dominic Monaghan, Viggo Mortensen and Elijah Wood) had the same tattoo with the exception of John Rhys-Davies whose stunt double had the tattoo instead.

On 12 February 2009, Bloom actively participated in the 'Australia Unites' fundraiser to raise support for the victims of the Australian bushfires on 7 February 2009.

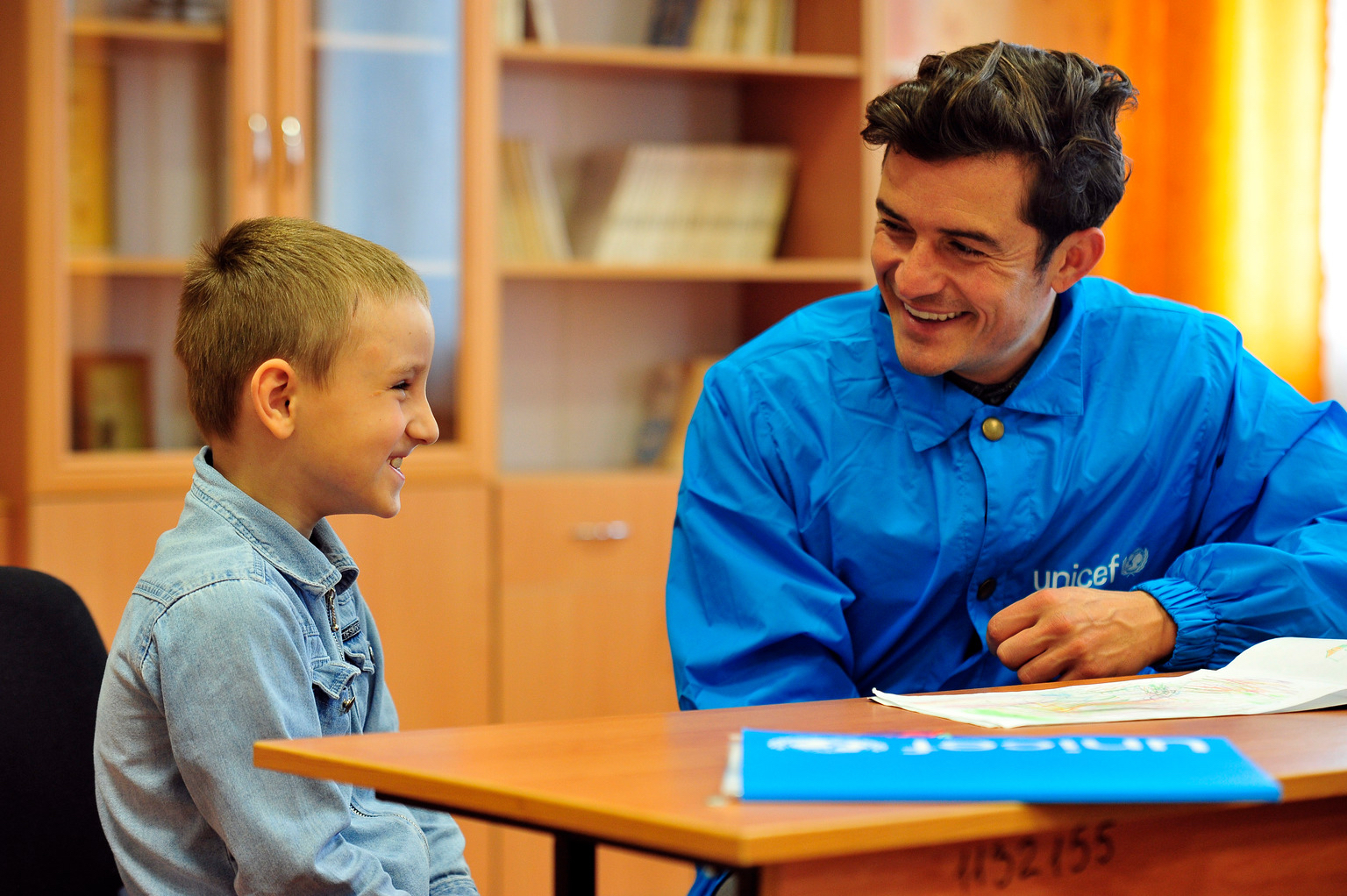
Appointed UNICEF Goodwill Ambassador in 2009, Bloom speaking to a schoolboy in Ukraine in 2016

On 12 October 2009, Bloom was named a UNICEF Goodwill Ambassador. He has been involved in the organisation since 2007 and has visited schools and villages in Nepal in support of sanitation and education programmes. Bloom also visited the city of Sloviansk in the east of Ukraine in April 2016 to raise awareness of the education crisis facing children during the Russo-Ukrainian war in 2014–2015. In 2023, Bloom returned to Ukraine again as a Goodwill Ambassador. Bloom met children affected by the war at a children's centre in Kyiv and met Ukrainian president Volodymyr Zelenskyy.

Bloom has sustained a number of injuries: he broke his left arm and cracked his skull three times, broke his nose while playing rugby union, broke his right leg skiing in Switzerland, broke his left leg in a motorbike crash and broke his right wrist while snowboarding. He also broke his back when he slipped trying to reach the roof terrace of a friend's house and fell three floors. He also broke some ribs while shooting The Lord of the Rings.

On 13 July 2009, four hooded teenagers broke into the Hollywood Hills home of Bloom and stole nearly half a million dollars' worth of possessions. The burglars, dubbed the "Bling Ring," targeted the homes of celebrities. Most of Bloom's stolen items were retrieved.

=== Relationships ===
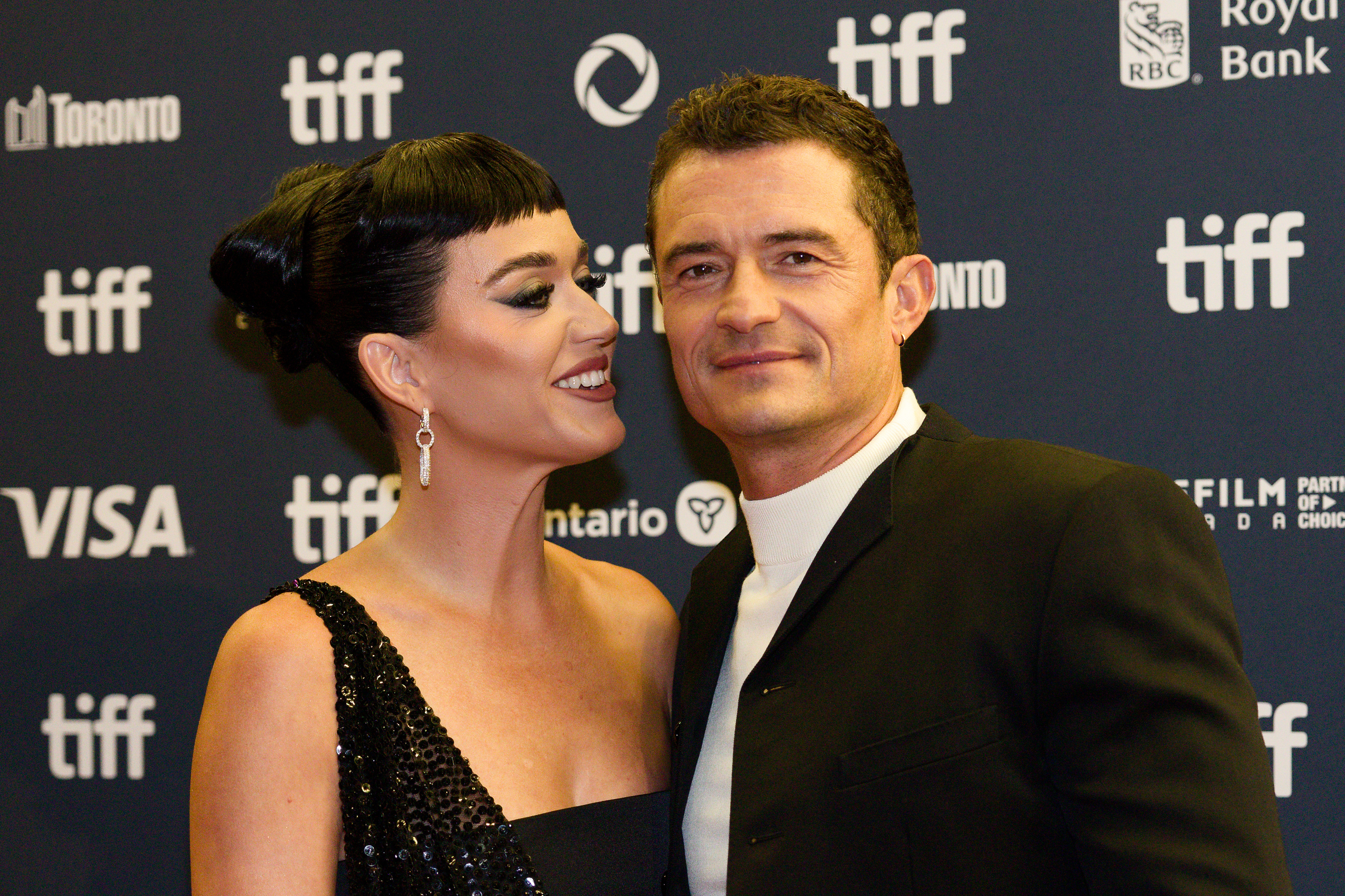
Bloom and Perry at the 2024 Toronto International Film Festival

Bloom had an "on-and-off relationship" with American actress Kate Bosworth from 2003 until ending the relationship in September 2006.

In late 2007, Bloom began dating Australian supermodel Miranda Kerr. They announced their engagement in June 2010, and were married the following month. Kerr gave birth to their son on 6 January 2011 in Los Angeles. In October 2013 the couple announced that they had separated several months earlier and intended to end their marriage. They were divorced by the end of the year.

In 2014, Bloom was in a relationship with French actress Nora Arnezeder.

Bloom began dating American singer and songwriter Katy Perry in January 2016; however, the couple confirmed in February 2017 that they had split. They resumed their relationship in February 2018 and became engaged on 14 February 2019. In March 2020 the music video for Perry's song "Never Worn White" revealed that the couple were expecting their first child together, their daughter was born in August 2020. In June 2025 it was reported that Bloom and Perry had separated.

== Achievements ==
Bloom appeared in his home city of Canterbury on 13 July 2010 when he was presented with an honorary Doctor of Arts degree from the University of Kent at Canterbury Cathedral. For contributions to the film industry, Bloom was inducted into the Hollywood Walk of Fame on 2 April 2014. His motion pictures walk of fame star is located at 6927 Hollywood Boulevard.

== Filmography ==
=== Film ===
Year	Title	Role	Notes
1997	Wilde	Rentboy	
2001	Black Hawk Down	PFC Todd Blackburn	
2001	The Lord of the Rings: The Fellowship of the Ring	Legolas	
2002	The Lord of the Rings: The Two Towers	Legolas	
2003	Ned Kelly	Joseph Byrne	
2003	Pirates of the Caribbean: The Curse of the Black Pearl	Will Turner	
2003	The Lord of the Rings: The Return of the King	Legolas	
2004	The Calcium Kid	Jimmy "The Calcium Kid" Connelly	
2004	Troy	Paris	
2004	Haven	Shy	Also co-producer
2005	Kingdom of Heaven	Balian de Ibelin	
2005	Elizabethtown	Drew Baylor	
2006	Love and Other Disasters	Hollywood Paolo	Cameo
2006	Pirates of the Caribbean: Dead Man's Chest	Will Turner	
2007	Pirates of the Caribbean: At World's End	Will Turner	
2007	Everest: A Climb for Peace	Narrator	Documentary
2009	New York, I Love You	David Cooler	Segment: "Shunji Iwai"
2010	Sympathy for Delicious	The Stain	
2010	Main Street	Harris Parker	
2011	The Good Doctor	Dr. Martin E. Blake	Also executive producer
2011	Fight for Your Right Revisited	Johnny Ryall	Short film
2011	The Three Musketeers	George Villiers, 1st Duke of Buckingham	
2013	Zulu	Brian Epkeen	
2013	The Bling Ring	Himself	Archived footage
2013	Romeo and Juliet	Romeo	Theatrical release of the Broadway play he starred in
2013	The Hobbit: The Desolation of Smaug	Legolas	
2014	The Hobbit: The Battle of the Five Armies	Legolas	
2015	Digging for Fire	Ben	
2017	Unlocked	Jack Alcott	
2017	Pirates of the Caribbean: Dead Men Tell No Tales	Will Turner	Cameo
2017	Romans	Malky	
2017	S.M.A.R.T. Chase	Danny Stratton	
2019	The Outpost	Captain Benjamin D. Keating	
2021	Billie Eilish: The World's a Little Blurry	Himself	Documentary
2021	Needle in a Timestack	Tommy Hambleton	
2023	Gran Turismo	Danny Moore	
2024	Red Right Hand	Cash	
2024	Peppa's Cinema Party	Mr. Raccoon	Voice role
2024	The Cut	The Boxer	
2025	Deep Cover	Marlon Swift	
2026	Bucking Fastard	Gareth Mulroney	
TBA	Wizards! †	TBA	Post-production

=== Television ===
Year	Title	Role	Notes
1994–1996	Casualty	Noel Harrison	Episodes: "Care in the Community", "Another Day in Paradise", "Made in Britain"
2000	Midsomer Murders	Peter Drinkwater	Episode: "Judgement Day"
2006	The Armenian Genocide	Auguste Berneau	Television documentary
2006	Extras	Himself	Episode: "Orlando Bloom"
2011	LA Phil Live	Romeo	Episode: "Dudamel Conducts Tchaikovsky"
2016	Easy	Tom	Episode: "Utopia"
2017	Tour de Pharmacy	Juju Peppi	Television film
2017	Stairway to Stardom	Himself	3 episodes
2019–2023	Carnival Row	Rycroft Philostrate	Main role; also executive producer
2021	The Prince	Prince Harry (voice)	Main role
2021	CBeebies Bedtime Story	Himself	Reading Littlest Dreamer: A Bedtime Adventure by Suzanne Smith
2024	To The Edge	Himself	Main role; also executive producer

=== Theatre ===
Year	Title	Playwright	Role	Venue
2007	In Celebration	David Storey	Steven	Duke of York's Theatre, West End
2013	Romeo and Juliet	William Shakespeare	Romeo	Richard Rodgers Theatre, Broadway
2018	Killer Joe	Tracy Letts	Joe Cooper	Trafalgar Studios 1, West End

=== Video games ===
Year	Title	Voice role	Notes
2002	The Lord of the Rings: The Two Towers	Legolas	
2003	The Lord of the Rings: The Return of the King	Legolas	archive sound
2004	The Lord of the Rings: The Third Age	Legolas	archive sound
2012	Lego The Lord of the Rings	Legolas	archive sound
2014	Lego The Hobbit	Legolas	archive sound
2015	Lego Dimensions	Legolas	archive sound
2016	Disney Magic Kingdoms	Will Turner	archive sound

=== Audiobooks ===
Year	Title	Voice role	Notes
2026	Hope Is Life's Treasure and Other Poems	Narrator	

== Awards and nominations ==
Year	Award	Category	Nominee	Result
2001	Phoenix Film Critics Society Awards	Best Cast	The Lord of the Rings: The Fellowship of the Ring	Won
2001	Empire Awards	Best Debut	The Lord of the Rings: The Fellowship of the Ring	Won
2001	MTV Movie Awards	Best Breakthrough Performance	The Lord of the Rings: The Fellowship of the Ring	Won
2001	Saturn Awards	Face of the Future – Male	The Lord of the Rings: The Fellowship of the Ring	Nominated
2001	Screen Actors Guild Awards	Outstanding Performance by a Cast in a Motion Picture	The Lord of the Rings: The Fellowship of the Ring	Nominated
2001	Teen Choice Awards	Choice Breakout (Male)	The Lord of the Rings: The Fellowship of the Ring	Nominated
2001	Phoenix Film Critics Society Awards	Best Cast	Black Hawk Down	Nominated
2002	Online Film Critics Society Awards	Best Cast	The Lord of the Rings: The Two Towers	Won
2002	Phoenix Film Critics Society Awards	Best Cast	The Lord of the Rings: The Two Towers	Won
2002	Screen Actors Guild Awards	Outstanding Performance by a Cast in a Motion Picture	The Lord of the Rings: The Two Towers	Nominated
2003	MTV Movie Awards	Best Trans-Atlantic Performance	The Lord of the Rings: The Two Towers	Nominated
2003	Australian Film Institute Awards	Best Actor in a Supporting Role	Ned Kelly	Nominated
2003	Broadcast Film Critics Association Awards	Best Cast	The Lord of the Rings: The Return of the King	Won
2003	National Board of Review Awards	Best Cast	The Lord of the Rings: The Return of the King	Won
2003	Phoenix Film Critics Society Awards	Best Cast	The Lord of the Rings: The Return of the King	Won
2003	Screen Actors Guild Awards	Outstanding Performance by a Cast in a Motion Picture	The Lord of the Rings: The Return of the King	Won
2003	Empire Awards	Best British Actor	The Lord of the Rings: The Return of the King	Nominated
2003	Teen Choice Awards	Choice Movie Actor – Drama/Action Adventure	The Lord of the Rings: The Return of the King	Nominated
2003	Hollywood Film Festival	Breakthrough Acting – Male	Pirates of the Caribbean: The Curse of the Black Pearl	Won
2003	Teen Choice Awards	Choice Movie Chemistry	Pirates of the Caribbean: The Curse of the Black Pearl	Won
2003	Teen Choice Awards	Choice Movie Liplock	Pirates of the Caribbean: The Curse of the Black Pearl	Won
2004	MTV Movie Awards Mexico	Sexiest Hero	Pirates of the Caribbean: The Curse of the Black Pearl	Won
2004	MTV Movie Awards	Best On-Screen Team	Pirates of the Caribbean: The Curse of the Black Pearl	Nominated
2005	Jameson People's Choice Award	Best European Actor	Kingdom of Heaven	Won
2005	Teen Choice Awards	Choice Movie Liplock	Kingdom of Heaven	Nominated
2006	Teen Choice Awards	Choice Rumble	Pirates of the Caribbean: Dead Man's Chest	Won
2006	Teen Choice Awards	Choice Liplock	Pirates of the Caribbean: Dead Man's Chest	Won
2006	Teen Choice Awards	Choice Actor: Drama/Action Adventure	Pirates of the Caribbean: Dead Man's Chest	Nominated
2007	Teen Choice Awards	Choice Movie Rumble	Pirates of the Caribbean: At World's End	Nominated
2007	National Movie Awards	Best Performance by a Male	Pirates of the Caribbean: At World's End	Won
2007	Teen Choice Awards	Choice Action Movie Actor	Pirates of the Caribbean: At World's End	Won
2007	Golden Raspberry Awards	Worst Supporting Actor	Pirates of the Caribbean: At World's End	Nominated
2014	MTV Movie Awards	Best Fight	The Hobbit: The Desolation of Smaug	Won
2014	MTV Movie Awards	Best On-Screen Transformation	The Hobbit: The Desolation of Smaug	Nominated
2015	Britannia Awards	Britannia Humanitarian Award		Honorary
2017	Teen Choice Awards	Choice Liplock (shared with Keira Knightley)	Pirates of the Caribbean: Dead Men Tell No Tales	Nominated

== See also ==
- They're Taking the Hobbits to Isengard, viral video built out of scenes from The Lord of the Rings: The Fellowship of the Ring and The Lord of the Rings: The Two Towers, where Orlando Bloom is seen playing the elf Legolas, who repeats the line "They're taking the hobbits to Isengard!"
