= John Bronco =

- Promotional poster
- Directed by: Jake Szymanski
- Written by: Marc Gilbar
- Produced by: Marc Gilbar; Meredith Kaulfers; Rebecca Donaghe; Maggie McLean
- Starring: Walton Goggins; Tim Meadows; Kareem Abdul-Jabbar; Bo Derek; Tim Baltz
- Cinematography: Nate Hurtsellers
- Edited by: Andrew Fitzgerald
- Production company: Imagine Entertainment
- Distributed by: Hulu
- Release date: August 27, 2020
- Running time: 37 minutes

John Bronco is a 2020 mockumentary comedy short film directed by Jake Szymanski and written by Marc Gilbar, starring Walton Goggins as the titular John Bronco. The film was produced for the Ford Motor Company for the reintroduction of the Ford Bronco brand.

== Synopsis ==
The story of the Ford Motor Company spokesperson, career, work as the Ford Bronco pitchman, and downfall, leaving public attention before his comeback.

== Cast ==
- Walton Goggins as John Bronco, Ford Motor Company pitchman
- Tim Meadows as Donovan Piggot
- Kareem Abdul-Jabbar as himself
- Bo Derek as herself
- Tim Baltz as Daniel Stacks
- John Moschitta Jr as himself
- Ellen Karsten as Bebe Parker
- Dennis Quaid as Narrator
