= 7 Days in Hell =

2015 mockumentary television film

- Film poster
- Genre: Comedy; Mockumentary
- Written by: Murray Miller
- Directed by: Jake Szymanski
- Starring: Andy Samberg; Kit Harington
- Narrated by: Jon Hamm
- Country of origin: United States
- Original language: English

Production
- Executive producers: Andy Samberg; Murray Miller; David Bernad
- Producer: Jonathan Buss
- Cinematography: Craig Kief
- Editors: Dan Marks; Pat Bishop
- Running time: 45 minutes

Original release
- Network: HBO
- Release: July 11, 2015

7 Days in Hell is a sports mockumentary directed by Jake Szymanski and written by Murray Miller. The film premiered on July 11, 2015, on HBO and July 8 on HBO Now. The film was inspired by the Isner–Mahut marathon men's singles match at the 2010 Wimbledon Championships.

== Plot ==
The film is framed as a fictitious HBO Sports documentary incorporating BBC footage. It explores the backgrounds of the competitors Aaron Williams and Charles Poole, two professional tennis players who face off in what becomes the longest match in history.

Aaron Williams is considered "The Bad Boy of Tennis." He is an American orphan who was found on the streets and adopted by Richard Williams, who raised Aaron with his daughters, Venus and Serena. At the 1996 Wimbledon Men's Singles Final, his serve hits a line judge, who dies from a heart attack. Williams doesn't win the match, and at the post-match ceremony pushes Prince Edward, then disappears.

Charles Poole is a British child prodigy, forced into a tennis career by his domineering mother, who threatens to disown him if he loses. On track to become the youngest professional tennis player in history, he appears on Caspian Wint's sports talk show hosted while only 15, telling Wint that he idolizes Williams.

Williams resurfaces in Sweden creating a male underwear line that is discontinued for causing infertility. Williams runs out of funds, descends into pornography and an addiction to PCP, and ends up in prison in Sweden.

Two weeks before the 2001 Wimbledon Championships starts, Poole is asked by a reporter if he is a better player than Williams, he says yes. This comment reaches Williams, who escapes prison and becomes a free man, according to Swedish law.

The All-England Chair Committee, led by the Duke of Kent, refuses to let Williams play. Committee member Edward Pudding, believing that Williams' participation will spike interest for the tournament, convinces the Committee to let the 128th-seeded Williams play the 2nd-seeded Poole.

The night before the match, Poole receives a call from Queen Elizabeth II, who tells him to "win."

On the first day of the match, Poole wins the first set 6–0. Before the second set starts, a thunderstorm suspends play for the rest of the day.

On the second day, a revitalized Williams takes the second and third sets under the influence of cocaine. That night, Poole gets another call from the Queen. She drunkenly shouts expletives and bribes him with a knighthood if he wins.

On the third day, neither Williams and Poole are willing to surrender the match. After eight hours of intense tennis, the match is suspended.

On the fourth day, a female streaker runs onto the court. Williams tries to subdue her, but ends up having hours of sex with her, then has sex with a male streaker, then has a threesome when the female returns; the match is suspended on account of darkness.

Before the fifth day, Williams arranges a press conference to announce he has located his birth father, British singer Engelbert Humperdinck. He claims he will dedicate his performance at Wimbledon to all Englishmen. After darkness again suspends the match, Poole is physically attacked in an elevator by the Queen.

Before the sixth day, Williams is hit by a truck, which is implied to be driven by Poole. Williams leaves the hospital and elects to play with one arm. In the 196th game, with Poole serving 98-97 and triple match point, illusionist David Copperfield appears on Poole's shoulders. Copperfield later claims (with a wink) that he was supposed to appear on the Statue of Liberty. Poole, distracted, fails to win the match in the sixth day.

Before the seventh day, Poole and Williams meet at a joint press conference. Williams reveals that a sex tape of himself and Poole's ex-girlfriend Lily has been leaked, enraging Poole.

The two proceed to the court. Queen Elizabeth is in the royal box, and when the two players challenge each other to fight, she orders the judges to allow them to fight. Poole and Williams charge the net and kill each other after simultaneously hitting one another in the head with their rackets. The two are buried together in the same coffin. The documentary ends with video flashbacks of Poole and Williams praising each other.

== Cast ==
- Andy Samberg as Aaron Williams
- Kit Harington as Charles Poole
- Fred Armisen as Edward Pudding, former president of the All England Club
- Lena Dunham as Lanny Denver, former president of Jordache
- Will Forte as Sandy Pickard, author of Aaron Williams: The Glorious Jester
- Karen Gillan as Lily Allsworth, Charles' supermodel ex-girlfriend
- Howie Mandel as Prince Edward, Duke of Kent
- Michael Sheen as Caspian Wint, a British sports journalist and host of the sports talk show Good Sport
- Mary Steenburgen as Louisa Poole, Charles' mother
- June Squibb as Queen Elizabeth II
- Jon Hamm as the narrator

Also appearing as themselves are David Copperfield, Chris Evert, Filip Hammar, Jim Lampley, John McEnroe, Soledad O’Brien, and Serena Williams.

== Broadcast ==
The American premiere on HBO on July 11, 2015, was watched by 579,000 viewers. In Australia, the telemovie premiered on August 8, 2015, on Showcase.

== Critical reception ==
On the review aggregator website Rotten Tomatoes, 87% of 38 critics' reviews are positive, with an average rating of 7.6/10. Metacritic, which uses a weighted average, assigned the film a score of 67 out of 100, based on 17 critics, indicating "generally favorable" reviews.

== See also ==
- Tour de Pharmacy
