= Jake Szymanski =

American actor

Jake Szymanski (born November 27, 1981) is an actor, writer, director, and producer known for Funny or Die, SNL Digital Shorts, Mike and Dave Need Wedding Dates (2016), 7 Days in Hell (2015), Tour de Pharmacy (2017), and The Package (2018).

Szymanski directed the 2023 television miniseries Jury Duty, which won a 2023 Peabody Award as an Entertainment Honoree.

== Filmography ==
=== Film ===
- Mike and Dave Need Wedding Dates (2016)
- The Package (2018)
- John Bronco (2020 short)
- Bad Day (2026)

==== Funny or Die shorts ====
- McCain's Roommates (2008)
- It's the Ass 'n Balls Show! (2008)
- Eva Longoria Sex Tape (2008)
- Paris Hilton Responds to McCain Ad (2008)
- High-Five Hollywood! (2008)
- Gina Gershon Strips Down Sarah Palin (2008)
- Ron Howard's Call to Action (2008)
- Paris Hilton Gets Presidential with Martin Sheen (2008)
- The Kevin Bacon Movie Club (2008)
- Obama (2008)
- Bat Fight with Will Ferrell (2009)
- Cougar 101 (2009)
- T-Pain vs. His Vocoder (2009)
- The Uncler (2009)
- Zac Efron's Pool Party (2009)
- Denise Richards' Funbags (2009)
- Attack Cardio (2009)
- Red Bull Energy Douche (2009)
- Nicole Eggert Is Back in Baywatch (2009)
- Lashisse (2009)
- Molly Sims Dramatic Acting Reel (2009)
- Three Matthew McConaugheys and a Baby (2009)
- Pete Carroll's Trip to Seattle Delayed (2010)
- Laptop Hunters: Brad (2010)
- Heidi Montag Says No to Plastic (2010)
- Presidential Reunion (2010)
- Forehead Tittaes (2010)
- Dirty Dancing 3: Capoeira Nights (2010)
- Kelly Brook's Cameltoe Shows (2010)
- Katie Couric Investigates the Sillies (2011)
- Betwixt the Music: Rebecca Black (2011)
- Forcin' the Blues (2011)
- Fish Gun (2011)
- World's Smallest Strike (2012)

=== Television ===
==== Television series ====
Year	Title	Episodes
2013	NTSF:SD:SUV::	"Burn After Killing" "Hawaii Die-0"
2013	Brooklyn Nine-Nine	"Christmas"
2014	Bad Judge	"Meteor Shower"
2023	Jury Duty	Episodes 1-8

==== TV movies ====
- Beef (2014)
- 7 Days in Hell (2015)
- Tour de Pharmacy (2017)

==== Saturday Night Live ====
Year	Segment	Host
2011	"Underground Festival"	Ben Stiller
2011	"New Baseball Movie"	Ben Stiller
2011	"Sex Ed Couples Therapy"	Steve Buscemi
2011	"Finnish Talk Show"	Katy Perry
2012	"In Memorium"	Charles Barkley
2012	"Ricky Gervais Promos"	Daniel Radcliffe
2012	"Spin the Bottle"	Daniel Radcliffe
2012	"Psychic Awards"	Lindsay Lohan
2012	"Tennis Balls"	Jonah Hill
2012	"Gotye Backstage"	Josh Brolin
