= Tour de Pharmacy =

2017 mockumentary film

- Promotional release poster
- Written by: Murray Miller
- Directed by: Jake Szymanski
- Starring: Andy Samberg; Orlando Bloom; Freddie Highmore; Daveed Diggs; John Cena
- Narrated by: Jon Hamm
- Country of origin: United States
- Original language: English

Production
- Producers: M. Elizabeth Hughes; Andy Samberg; Murray Miller; Jake Szymanski; David Bernad
- Cinematography: Craig Kief
- Editors: Michael Giambra; Daniel Reitzenstein; Bijan Shams
- Running time: 41 minutes

Original release
- Network: HBO
- Release: July 8, 2017

Tour de Pharmacy is a 2017 made-for-television mockumentary sports film directed by Jake Szymanski and written by Murray Miller, starring Andy Samberg, Orlando Bloom, Freddie Highmore, Daveed Diggs, and John Cena. It premiered on HBO on July 8, 2017. A follow-up to 7 Days in Hell, also written and directed by Miller and Szymanski and starring Samberg, it is a satire of the various controversies surrounding doping in sports, specifically as it relates to cycling.

== Plot ==
On the first day of the 1982 Tour de France, Italian cyclist JuJu Peppi (Orlando Bloom) accidentally causes a pileup after attempting to grope a bikini clad female spectator, which causes a massive brawl to break out between all the other cyclists, postponing the race until further notice. Police find evidence of narcotics being used by the cyclists and it is revealed that UCI president Ditmer Klerken (Kevin Bacon) accepted bribes of $50,000 each from a majority of the competitors to forego preliminary drug testing. Although all the cyclists are suspected of doping, the UCI allows the Tour to continue with the five competitors who didn't pay off Klerken: Peppi, American-born Nigerian cyclist Marty Hass (Andy Samberg), who is resented by Nigeria for being the one to represent the country, French cyclist Adrian Baton (Freddie Highmore), who is secretly a woman named Adrianna Baton disguised as a man so she can compete, African-American cyclist Slim Robinson (Daveed Diggs), nephew of Jackie Robinson, who wants to break the color barrier in cycling like Jackie did in baseball, and Austrian cyclist Gustav Ditters (John Cena), who had gained a considerable amount of muscle mass from the previous year due to steroids.

Before resuming the race, the five agree to take turns at the front so everyone else can draft to conserve their energy before the finish line. However, when the race resumes, no one is willing to ride up front, so the cyclists attempt to go as slowly as possible to conserve their energy. This allows Robinson to enjoy the scenery and he eventually leaves the race with a female spectator to become the first black French dairy farmer. Before the end of the day, Ditters is taunted by a spectator for being unable to go fast. When the race resumes ten days later, an enraged Ditters goes as fast as possible to win the day, much to the shock of observers. Believing he had used enhancements, police raid his apartment and find that he had been doping himself with cheetah's blood, which gets Ditters disqualified. When the race resumes, Peppi dies when he overexerts himself, causing his heart to explode within his chest, and falls off a cliff.

Hass and Baton are the only competitors left, but they end up becoming attracted to each other and pause the race to go and have sex in the woods. Hass finds out Baton's true identity and agrees to keep it a secret, which inadvertently turns them into gay sports icons. When they resume the race, they tie their bicycles together to make sure they both win simultaneously. On the final day of the race, BBC reporter Rex Honeycut (James Marsden), who had ridden alongside the competitors for real time interviews during the race, is told that because he had ridden all laps of the race and registered to ride on the Tour, he is eligible to win the Tour de France and makes an attempt to do so. Baton detaches from Hass and jumps at Honeycut, knocking him to the ground so Hass can win the race. Honeycut is shown to have motorized his bicycle to keep up with the cyclists. Baton's true identity is exposed and is sentenced to 35 years in prison for manslaughter as Honeycut had been accidentally killed during the scuffle.

Hass looks set to win the Tour de France until Robinson, who had missed the thrill of cycling, rushes out to the front and wins the race by 73 feet (22 m). Robinson relishes being the first African-American to excel at cycling like his uncle did at baseball, while Hass laments that Baton's sacrifice was in vain.

Present day interviews are conducted with Hass (Jeff Goldblum), Baton (Julia Ormond), Robinson (Danny Glover), and Ditters (Dolph Lundgren), along with other outside observers, including disgraced cyclist Lance Armstrong, who insists on remaining anonymous.

== Cast ==
- Andy Samberg as Marty Hass, Nigerian cyclist
  - Jeff Goldblum as current-day Marty Hass
- Orlando Bloom as JuJu Peppi, Italian cyclist
- Freddie Highmore as Adrian Baton, French cyclist
  - Julia Ormond as current-day Adrian Baton aka Adrianna Baton
- Daveed Diggs as "Slim" Robinson, American cyclist and (fictional) nephew of Jackie Robinson
  - Danny Glover as current-day "Slim" Robinson
- John Cena as Gustav Ditters, Austrian cyclist
  - Dolph Lundgren as current-day Gustav Ditters
- James Marsden as Rex Honeycut, a BBC reporter
- Will Forte as a French Police Officer investigating an amphetamine-laced water bottle
- Maya Rudolph as Lucy Flerng, editor-in-chief of Cycling Enthusiast Magazine
- Kevin Bacon as Ditmer Klerken, former president of UCI
- Phylicia Rashad as Victoria Young, an animator
- Adewale Akinnuoye-Agbaje as Olusegun Okorocha, Marty's childhood neighbor
- Nathan Fielder as Stu Ruckman, current head of the World Anti-Doping Agency
- Chris "Romanski" Romano as Jabin Dolchey, a steroid-addled cyclist
- Jon Hamm as The Narrator
- Edgar Wright as The British Sports Commentator
- J. J. Abrams as Himself
- Lance Armstrong as Himself
- Mike Tyson as Himself
- Joe Buck as Himself
- Chris Webber as Himself

== Production ==
In looking to make a follow up to 7 Days in Hell, Samberg and his crew looked for a sport that could be displayed cheaply while also having comic potential. In researching, the team found "so much strange behavior surrounding the sport," telling Vulture that "...we felt like it was a funny thing to really exaggerate and blow up for comedic purposes." Although much of the cast consists of fans of the sport this was not a prerequisite. Lance Armstrong's role was written in with the knowledge that he might not want to be involved, but after being contacted by Samberg, the cyclist agreed to take part.

The film's race scenes were shot over the course of four days, and the interviews filmed over a longer period, to accommodate the stars' schedules. To maintain an 80's aesthetic, much of the race footage was shot on Betamax cameras, with "sideline footage" shot on VHS.

== Reception ==
=== Critical response ===
Tour de Pharmacy received generally positive reviews, but some criticized Lance Armstrong's appearance. On the review aggregator site Rotten Tomatoes, Tour de Pharmacy holds a 90% approval rating based on 20 reviews with an average rating of 7.5/10. On Metacritic, the film has a score of 71 out of 100 based on reviews from 13 critics, indicating "generally favorable reviews".

The Atlantic's Sophie Gilbert commented, "it takes the thorny subject of doping in professional cycling and turns it into pure, gleeful mayhem", later calling the mockumentary "insane, filthy, and totally fun". Uproxx's Alan Sepinwall praised the film for its silliness, calling it the "funniest 40 minutes of TV you’ll see this week". The San Francisco Chronicle's David Wiegand commented that "early moments of the film almost feel like a real documentary". The New York Times' Neil Genzlinger asked whether it was "O.K. for a mockumentary about a tarnished sport to include in its cast the athlete responsible for much of the tarnishing?", questioning whether Lance Armstrong's appearance "will leave an icky aftertaste". Genzlinger also called "this star-filled parody [...] a hilarious home run". The Los Angeles Times' Robert Lloyd wrote, "it's a sketch, essentially, effectively blown out to 40 minutes — not too short, not too long."

== See also ==
- List of films about bicycles and cycling
- 7 Days in Hell
