= Presidential Reunion =

2010 film by Ron Howard

- Directed by: Ron Howard; Jake Szymanski
- Screenplay by: Al Jean; Adam McKay; Tom Gammill; Max Pross
- Based on: Saturday Night Live presidential sketches
- Produced by: Funny or Die
- Starring: Fred Armisen; Will Ferrell; Darrell Hammond; Jim Carrey; Dana Carvey; Dan Aykroyd; Chevy Chase; Maya Rudolph
- Cinematography: Antonio Scarlata
- Edited by: Bradly Schulz; Justin Donaldson
- Production company: Funny or Die
- Release date: March 3, 2010
- Running time: 6 minutes
- Country: United States
- Language: English

Presidential Reunion is a 2010 American comedy Web short directed by Ron Howard and Jake Szymanski and starring Saturday Night Live cast members who parodied Presidents Ford to Obama. The skit was released onto the Funny or Die website on March 3, 2010, and received negative reviews.

== Plot ==
As President Barack Obama prepares for bed he is too concerned about a problem with the banks and credit card companies in America. Michelle convinces him to retire for the evening, but as soon as he does, former Presidents Bill Clinton and George W. Bush enter the room. Clinton and Bush come to offer Obama advice as to how to handle the situation, reminiscing on their past duties. George H. W. Bush then exits the bathroom and offers his advice to the Obamas: to forget about approval rates. Jimmy Carter then enters the room (with a toolbox and begins fixing a random object on the wall) and is ridiculed by the other former presidents. Carter tells Obama to establish a consumer finance agency, stating people are becoming frustrated with being conned by banks and credit card companies. Ronald Reagan then appears before the group, surprising Carter (since Reagan is dead).

Reagan tells Obama to grow some balls in order to take on the banks and credit companies. Gerald Ford enters the room (tripping over a table, spoofing himself slipping on a set of stairs exiting Air Force One) and Chase breaks character, assuming it is another episode of SNL, only to be informed he is on Funny or Die. Ford suggests the only way to stop the banks is to pardon Richard Nixon (which he did). Carter interprets what Ford really means, but Ford is shocked to see Carter, thinking he was dead, only to be informed he was dead. The group ask Obama if their suggestions helped, but Obama dismisses them, saying they were the reason the mess was created. Reagan then quotes a false George Washington statement, saying Obama is "it," and the group begins taunting Obama until he wakes up and realizes that he does need to be the one to establish a CFA, rushing off to gather his cabinet.

== Cast ==
- Fred Armisen as Barack Obama
- Darrell Hammond as Bill Clinton
- Will Ferrell as George W. Bush
- Dana Carvey as George H. W. Bush
- Dan Aykroyd as Jimmy Carter
- Jim Carrey as Ronald Reagan (the only cast member on this video who did not portray the same role on Saturday Night Live)
- Chevy Chase as Gerald Ford
- Maya Rudolph as Michelle Obama
