= Bosniaks in Syria =

Regions with significant populations
- Aleppo, Damascus

Languages
- Arabic

Religion
- Sunni Islam

Related ethnic groups
- Bosniaks, Bushnak

Bosniaks in Syria, also known as Bosnians in Syria, refers to citizens of Syria who are, or descend from, ethnic Bosnian Muslim people. They form one of the smaller ethnic minorities in the country.

Much of the Bosniak community have become Arabized; for this reason, they are often counted as "Arab". Many Bosniaks who adhere to Islam self-identify as Arabs. However, there are still some who have retained their national identity.

== History ==
In the 19th century, some of the Bosniaks who were expelled from Balkan lands under the new Christian rulers emigrated as refugees to Ottoman Syria.

== See also ==
- Bushnak
- Islam in Syria
