= Suzan Bushnaq =

Kuwaiti artist

Suzan Bushnaq (سوزان بوشناق)
- Born: 2 November 1963 (age 62); Kuwait
- Known for: Painting
- Awards: Arbitration Award at the Kharafi Biennial, won 3 awards at the Qurain Festival and an Issa Sakr award.

Suzan Bushnaq (born November 2, 1963) (Arabic: سوزان بوشناق) is a Kuwaiti artist. Her paintings are principally impressionistic images related to women's vitality, power, and beauty. She is known for colorful expressionistic depictions of the female form.

She is the daughter of the Palestinian artist Mohammed Bushnaq (born 1934). She studied art under her father at the Russian College of Art (1982–1989).

== Exhibitions ==
Suzan Bushnaq has had exhibitions (2006 and 2008) at the Art Gallery (Kuwait) (under the auspices of the National Council for Culture and Arts and exhibitions at the Al Kharafi Biennale (2004) and at the Qurain Cultural Festival (2004, 2005, 2010). She has also had exhibitions in the lounge room of Boushahri Art Gallery 1999-2001-2003 and an exhibition at Dar Al Funoon Gallery in 2006. Her artworks was shown the 59th Venice Biennale in the 'From Palestine With Art' exhibition organised by the Palestine Museum US.

== Awards ==
She has been awarded an Arbitration Award at the Kharafi Biennial, won awards at the Qurain Festival and an Issa Sakr award.
