= Everest Peace Project =

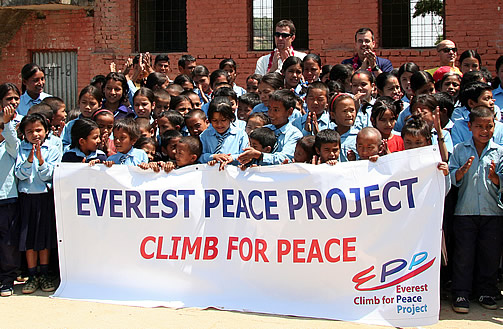

The Everest Peace Project is an organization based in the United States that promotes peace, teamwork and cultural understanding by climbing some of the highest peaks in the world by a team of individuals from various faiths and cultures.

== Climbs ==
- In 2004 the Everest Peace Project climbed Mount Shasta to celebrate the United Nations International Day of Peace.
- In 2005 the Everest Peace Project climbed Mount Kilimanjaro.
- In 2006 the Everest Peace Project climbed Mount Everest on May 18; the summit was reached by a trio composed of two Israelis (Dudu Yifrah and Micha Yaniv) and a Palestinian (Ali Bushnaq); Yifrah unfolded a sewn together Israeli–Palestinian flag on the summit of Everest. The climb is the main focus of the documentary film Everest: A Climb for Peace, narrated by Orlando Bloom. The documentary has been hailed as a "tremendous achievement" by the Dalai Lama and has received his endorsement.
