= Daniel Doheny =

Canadian actor (born 1997)

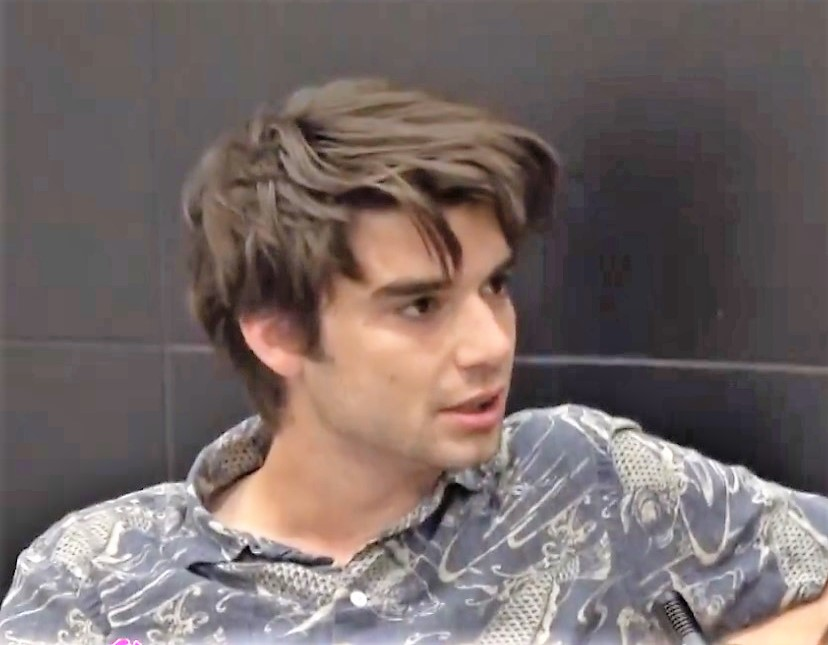
- Doheny in 2018
- Born: Vancouver, British Columbia, Canada
- Occupation: Actor
- Years active: 2012–present

Daniel Doheny is a Canadian actor known for starring in the 2017 Canadian comedy film Adventures in Public School and the 2018 Netflix films Alex Strangelove, a coming-of-age story, and The Package, a raunchy comedy.

== Early life and education ==
Doheny was born and raised in Vancouver, British Columbia, Canada, where he graduated from Lord Byng Secondary School in 2008. He then went on to attend Studio 58, a professional theatre training program at Langara College, where he graduated in 2012.

== Career ==
In 2013, Doheny played six roles in Hamlet and Twelfth Night during the summer season of Bard on the Beach. He returned to the Bard stage in 2016 in The Merry Wives of Windsor.

Doheny is also part of the sketch comedy troupe HumanTown, who won the Canadian Broadcasting Corporation's ComedyCoup competition in 2014. As part of the prize, the troupe wrote, produced, and acted in a self-titled comedy special which aired on CBC Television in 2016.

Doheny won the Vancouver Film Critics Circle award for Best Actor in a Canadian Film at the Vancouver Film Critics Circle Awards 2021, for his performance in the film Drinkwater.

== Filmography ==
=== Film ===
Year	Title	Role	Notes
2012	Hart Attack: First Gear	Dane Jermaine	
2017	Adventures in Public School	Liam Heap	Main role
2018	Alex Strangelove	Alex Truelove	Main role
2018	The Package	Sean Floyd	Main role
2021	Drinkwater	Mike Drinkwater	Main role
2024	Scared Shitless	Sonny	Main role
2024	The Order	Walter West	
2026	Breeder	Russell	Main role

=== Television ===
Year	Title	Role	Notes
2016	HumanTown	Various characters	TV film
2017	Supernatural	Jarrod Hayes	Episode: "The Memory Remains"
2018	Beyblade Burst	Bisuke (English version, voice)	Episode: "Spryzen the Destroyer!"
2019	Superbook	Carter	Episode: "Nicodemus"
2019	Ninjago	Jimmy	2 episodes
2020	My Little Pony: Pony Life	Alt-Pony 1 / Alt-Pony 2 / Tank (voice)	3 episodes
2020	Loudermilk	Ryan	Episode: "Just What I Needed"
2021	Day of the Dead	Luke Bowman	Main role
2021	Brand New Cherry Flavor	Johnathan Burke	Recurring role
2023	Lucky Hank	Russell	Recurring role
