= Mohammed Bushnaq =

Palestinian artist (1934–2017)

Mohammed Bushnaq محمد بشناق
- Born: 28 May 1934 near Haifa, Mandatory Palestine
- Died: 26 May 2017 (aged 82)
- Known for: Paintings, sculpture

Mohammed Bushnaq (Arabic: محمد بشناق; May 28, 1934 – May 26, 2017), was a Palestinian artist noted for his paintings and sculpture. His daughter is the artist Suzan Bushnaq.

Bushnaq's artwork featured on many of the covers of the magazine Palestinian Affairs (Shu'un Filastinyya), a quarterly magazine issued by the Palestine Liberation Organization's Palestine Research Center (PRC).

== Other sources ==
- sha3erjordan.net
- addustour.com, issue 683
- addustour.com, issue 860
