= Two and a Half Men season 11 =

Two and a Half Men
- Season 11
- DVD cover art
- Showrunners: Don Reo; Jim Patterson
- Starring: Ashton Kutcher; Jon Cryer; Amber Tamblyn; Conchata Ferrell
- No. of episodes: 22

Release
- Original network: CBS
- Original release: September 26, 2013 – May 8, 2014

Season chronology
- ← Previous; Season 10 Next → Season 12

The eleventh season of the American television sitcom Two and a Half Men aired on CBS from September 26, 2013 to May 8, 2014.

This season marks another major change in the series as Amber Tamblyn joins the cast as Jenny, Charlie's illegitimate daughter. Tamblyn was promoted to series regular on October 2, 2013. This season is also the first and only season not to feature Angus T. Jones, who portrayed Jake Harper during the first ten seasons, in any capacity. He would return the following season as a guest star in the show's final episode.

== Production ==
Angus T. Jones was originally downgraded to a recurring cast member this season while he attended college; however, on March 18, 2013, Jones officially confirmed that he would not return for season 11. In his absence, the series introduced Amber Tamblyn, who portrays Jenny, the illegitimate, lesbian daughter of Charlie Harper. It had been announced on May 30, 2013 that a female character was to be added to the show and that producers were looking for a woman to play the part. Tamblyn's addition to the cast was confirmed on August 7, 2013, and she made her first appearance in the season premiere. Although the role was initially announced as a series regular, it was later announced to be a recurring role, with the option to become a series regular later. On October 2, 2013, Tamblyn was promoted to series regular. Ashton Kutcher had nothing but praise for Tamblyn, calling her "amazing." Holland Taylor, who only appeared in one episode last season, appears in more episodes this season.

Amber Tamblyn joined the cast as the new "half man", replacing Angus T. Jones. This is also the first season not to feature an opening sequence with the three leads singing along to the theme song "Manly Men". Instead, the opening titles features the shortened version of the theme with the show's title against a black background (a slide that has been frequently used throughout the series).

Lynda Carter guest starred in the episode "Justice in Star-Spangled Hot Pants", playing a closeted lesbian version of herself. The episode's plot was inspired by a meeting Carter had with Jon Cryer, who is a fan of her. Country singer Brad Paisley, whose wife Kimberly Williams-Paisley had a recurring guest role during the season, appeared in the season finale. Mila Kunis, Ashton Kutcher's wife, guest starred in the episode "Lan Mao Shi Zai Wuding Shang".

== Cast ==
Main article: List of Two and a Half Men characters

=== Main ===
- Ashton Kutcher as Walden Schmidt
- Jon Cryer as Alan Harper
- Amber Tamblyn as Jenny
- Conchata Ferrell as Berta

=== Recurring ===
- Holland Taylor as Evelyn Harper-Pepper
- Courtney Thorne-Smith as Lyndsey McElroy
- D. B. Sweeney as Larry Martin
- Clark Duke as Barry Foster
- Kimberly Williams-Paisley as Gretchen Martin
- Aly Michalka as Brooke
- Odette Annable as Nicole
- Brooke D'Orsay as Kate

=== Guest ===
- Carl Reiner as Marty Pepper
- Edie McClurg as Helen
- Jennifer Aspen as Stephanie
- Lynda Carter as herself
- Mimi Rogers as Robin Schmidt
- Jeff Probst as himself
- Madison Dylan as Laurie
- Spencer Locke as Jill
- Melanie Lynskey as Rose
- Brian Stepanek as Arthur
- Paula Marshall as Paula
- Kate Miner as Nadine
- Diane Farr as Rachel
- Marion Ross as Margaret, Jeff Probst's grandmother
- Brooke Lyons as Gwen
- Tim Conway as Tim
- Steve Lawrence as Steve
- Garry Marshall as Garry
- Marin Hinkle as Judith Harper-Melnick
- Mila Kunis as Vivian
- Jane Lynch as Dr. Linda Freeman
- Ken Davitian as Mr. Mardirosian
- Jamie Luner as Tracy
- Alex Kapp Horner as Donna
- Sandra Purpuro as Cynthia
- Diedrich Bader as Dirk
- Brad Paisley as Derek

== Episodes ==
No. overall	No. in season	Title	Directed by	Written by	Original release date	Prod. code	U.S. viewers (millions)
225	1	"Nangnangnangnang"	James Widdoes	Story by : Chuck Lorre & Susan McMartin; Teleplay by : Don Reo & Jim Patterson & Steve Tompkins	September 26, 2013	4X5351	11.59
When a mysterious 25-year-old woman (Amber Tamblyn) arrives at the beach house, she announces to Alan that she is Charlie's daughter, Jenny, explaining that she was conceived when Charlie had a one night stand with her mother back in the 1980s. She says that Charlie always knew he had a daughter, and though he was banned from ever seeing her, he paid child support every month to her mother. Though delighted to meet his long lost niece, Alan informs Jenny that Charlie is dead (which disheartens her a bit). He later introduces Jenny to Evelyn, who says she is thrilled to have a grandchild (completely disregarding Jake). Jenny is surprised that Walden does not have a woman in his life, being a handsome bachelor with a Malibu beach house. She uses the house to pick up a waitress at a bar, and Walden assumes the woman is for him until Jenny says that she brought the waitress home for herself, revealing that she is a lesbian, shocking Alan, Walden and Evelyn. First appearance of: Jenny Title quotation from: Evelyn, to Alan, describing how he used to gnaw on her nipples when he was a baby. Later, Walden repeats the line to irritate Alan.
226	2	"I Think I Banged Lucille Ball"	James Widdoes	Story by : Chuck Lorre & Alissa Neubauer; Teleplay by : Don Reo & Jim Patterson & Jeff Lowell	October 3, 2013	4X5352	9.34
Walden is not happy with Jenny living in Jake's old room because he wants to put in a gym in the room. Evelyn invites Jenny to move in with her and her 91-year-old boyfriend, Marty (Carl Reiner), a wealthy retired producer. At first, Marty is hoping for a three-way sexual encounter with both of them. Later at Walden's beach house, they all get high at a party that Charlie would have loved. Marty thinks Jenny is coming between Evelyn and himself, so Evelyn makes it up to him right there in the living room. Walden and Jenny also bond; he tells her that she and the rest of the Harpers are like family, and that she can stay over occasionally. Lyndsey and Alan start having sex again, although they are not in a relationship, as she has a boyfriend. Starting to crave their old relationship, Alan gets hurt when he asks Lyndsey over for dinner to meet Jenny and she stays home with her boyfriend. Alan is mad and goes to Lyndsey's boyfriend's house to tell off Lyndsey, but she convinces him that he is not mad enough to stop having sex with her. Title quotation from: Evelyn's boyfriend, Marty, remembering about a possible past escapade in the beach house. (The full line is: "I think I banged Lucille Ball...in THIS house.")
227	3	"This Unblessed Biscuit"	James Widdoes	Story by : Chuck Lorre & Jim Patterson; Teleplay by : Don Reo & Matt Ross & Max Searle	October 10, 2013	4X5353	9.14
Walden and Alan think it may be time for Berta to retire when she injures her back at work. When they suggest her retiring, she grows offended, and as the conversation progresses she quits. Walden and Alan then try different maids, with little success. The first one is highly religious and wants to "save" Alan and Walden, thinking that they are homosexuals; the second has four guns and a shank in her purse; and the third is a black schizophrenic who has issues with Walden's and Alan's supposed racist remarks. The two then go to apologize to Berta; she accepts and goes back to work for them. Title quotation from: Alan, after taking a bite out of a biscuit before the first replacement maid says grace.
228	4	"Clank, Clank, Drunken Skank"	James Widdoes	Story by : Chuck Lorre & Susan McMartin; Teleplay by : Jim Patterson & Don Reo & Steve Tompkins	October 17, 2013	4X5354	8.59
Alan and Lyndsey's illicit relationship becomes jeopardized when one of Lyndsey's man-hunting friends, Stephanie (Jennifer Aspen), asks if they are back together. The two staunchly deny it, then Lyndsey insists that Alan make a date with Stephanie so that she will believe their lie. Alan meets her for an uncomfortable date, which nevertheless leads to sex, causing Lyndsey to get mad and leave Alan again. Walden plays strip poker with Jenny and her friends as they start to bond. The group parties hard the next night, then returns home to skinny dip in the ocean. Walden and Jenny wake up in bed together naked, with no recollection of how they got there. Walden eventually produces the video taken with Charlie's bedroom camera to see if he and Jenny "did it." As they watch the video, they see Walden and one of the other girls making out on the bed. Jenny comes in with another girl, followed by everyone from the beach bonfire, including Berta, who walks in and says she also joined the orgy (and had sex with James Franco). Title quotation from: Stephanie, telling Alan she frequently sees a drunk Lyndsey carrying a bag of empty wine bottles to the curb.
229	5	"Alan Harper, Pleasing Women Since 2003"	James Widdoes	Story by : Steve Tompkins & Alissa Neubauer & Don Reo; Teleplay by : Jim Patterson & Jeff Lowell & Jim Vallely	October 24, 2013	4X5355	8.53
Alan and Lyndsey are back to their sex-only relationship. After a session of what Lyndsey says was incredible lovemaking, Alan suggests they get back together. Lyndsey insists that she needs both Alan and her new boyfriend, Larry Martin, because each man pleases her in different ways. Determined to find out what Larry provides that he cannot, Alan joins Larry's spin class under the fake name "Jeff Strongman". He finds Larry (D.B. Sweeney) to be incredibly friendly and supportive, and later accepts his invitation to watch the Los Angeles Lakers game from a luxury suite. But Lyndsey surprises Larry (along with Alan/"Jeff") at the suite. She asks Larry to retrieve something from her car so she can confront Alan directly, but instead she takes Alan to have sex in the en suite bathroom. Meanwhile, Walden tries to get Jenny to return to her acting classes. Jenny tries a couple of classes, but then quits again, leaving Walden miffed about the prospect of having "two Alans" in his house. But the next day, Jenny announces she has landed an audition – the result of having drinks with a casting agent who turned out to be lesbian. Title quotation from: Alan, referring to the year he divorced Judith, after Lyndsey tells him he was incredible during their last lovemaking session.
230	6	"Justice in Star-Spangled Hot Pants"	James Widdoes	Story by : Don Reo & Susan McMartin & Jon Cryer; Teleplay by : Jim Patterson & Tim Kelleher & Jeff Lowell	November 7, 2013	4X5356	8.27
At a benefit hosted by Walden's mother, Robin, Alan sees his first celebrity crush, Lynda Carter, who mistakes Alan and Walden for a gay couple when Walden's mother tells her that they live together. Alan tries to convince Walden to set him up on a date with Lynda, but Walden refuses. However, a talk with Jenny changes Walden's mind and he invites his mother and Lynda over for dinner. Despite Walden's pleas for Alan to "be cool", Alan acts like a crazed fan, getting Lynda to sign his Wonder Woman memorabilia. Lynda really wants Walden, and she starts to kiss him while they are on the deck. A furious Alan catches them, and ropes Walden with a replica of the Lasso of Truth. In the resulting tussle, both Alan and Walden fall over the deck railing onto the beach. The next morning, Jenny sneaks both Robin and Lynda out of her room, while the oblivious Alan and Walden are on the deck apologizing to each other. Title quotation from: Alan, describing Lynda as Wonder Woman.
231	7	"Some Kind of Lesbian Zombie"	James Widdoes	Story by : Jim Patterson & Steve Tompkins & Jeff Lowell; Teleplay by : Don Reo & Matt Ross & Max Searle	November 14, 2013	4X5357	8.66
After watching Jenny pick up yet another woman at Pavlov's, Alan and Walden hit it off with the intellectual Jill (Spencer Locke) and the ditzy Laurie (Madison Dylan). Lyndsey then unexpectedly shows up, putting Alan in an awkward situation when he does not know how to tell Lyndsey he has a date. Lyndsey is originally fine with it, but later drunkenly calls him on the phone just as Alan is about to have sex with Laurie. Walden tells Alan it is only fair, since Lyndsey is using him also. Lyndsey then shows up at the door and tries to seduce Alan, only for Laurie to emerge from Alan's room. The girls trade insults before Lyndsey throws up on Walden's rug. Alan goes to Lyndsey's house to apologize, but also to clarify that he is done being used by her while she is with Larry, and says goodbye to Lyndsey before Lyndsey decides that she is going to break up with Larry and stay with Alan. While in bed, however, they decide that Larry is missing from the relationship and opt to give it another shot. Walden goes to Jill's apartment to get back together, but Jill is already being entertained by Jeff Probst, who had earlier been cooking on the beach. Title quotation from: Walden, about how Jenny is able to pick up straight women.
232	8	"Mr. Walden, He Die. I Clean Room."	James Widdoes	Story by : Chuck Lorre & Jim Patterson & Steve Tompkins; Teleplay by : Don Reo & Susan McMartin & Saladin K. Patterson	November 21, 2013	4X5359	8.69
Alan finds out that Larry believes Lyndsey is having an affair, but thinks that it is with Walden. He has hired a private investigator to watch the beach house. While Alan is out with Larry, Walden is picked up by Rose in a taxicab, who claims that Walden is being followed. Alan and Larry go to the beach house and find Lyndsey. She claims that she rented it to enact his fantasy that she has an affair and then they have a threesome with Jenny (disgusting Alan, who is a tad annoyed that Lyndsey is doing something like this in front of him, in addition to cheating on him with Larry when they were together). Walden and Rose check into a sleazy motel, apologize to each other for all of the grief between them, and ultimately end up sleeping together. Larry calls Rose after learning that Lyndsey supposedly was not cheating on him and tells her that he does not need a private investigator anymore. Meanwhile, Walden thinks that he is still a wanted man and ends up naked in the bushes outside his motel room while being pursued by the stoned manager. Title quotation from: Walden, pretending to be a foreign housekeeper in order to dodge the hitman that is supposedly looking for him at the door.
233	9	"Numero Uno Accidente Lawyer"	James Widdoes	Story by : Don Reo & Tim Kelleher & Nathan Chetty; Teleplay by : Jim Patterson & Saladin K. Patterson & Jim Valley	December 5, 2013	4X5358	8.47
Walden meets a beautiful girl named Nadine (Kate Miner) at a tech convention, but she reveals she is there as a model. He finds her lack of intelligence to be unappealing, and does not want to see her again. Unfortunately, Nadine proves to be clumsy as well as stupid, as she falls over the balcony railing and goes to hospital. Taking care of Nadine becomes more and more daunting because she keeps suffering major self-inflicted injuries. Walden ultimately tells Nadine that he no longer wants to continue their relationship. She promises to sue him for injuries suffered on his property, only to get hit by a bus after leaving. Walden finds himself taking care of her only companion, a pet pig named Frank. Meanwhile, Alan's evening plan of looking over some of Jake's old items inspires Jenny to take him to a gay bar where there will be horny, drunk straight women by night's end. Alan meets an attractive woman named Paula (Paula Marshall) and the two later sleep together. To Alan's surprise, Paula reveals that she was a man named Paul for 40 years, before undergoing gender-reassignment surgery. Alan is shocked but takes the news fairly in stride, even being okay with Paula stepping in at a movie theatre and punching out a jerk who ignored Alan's request to stop talking during the movie. Title quotation from: Nadine, describing the lawyer who will represent her when she sues Walden.
234	10	"On Vodka, on Soda, on Blender, on Mixer!"	James Widdoes	Story by : Don Reo & Jim Patterson & Jeff Lowell; Teleplay by : Saladin K. Patterson & Matt Ross & Max Searle	December 12, 2013	4X5360	8.54
Alan is excited to receive a Christmas present from Jake until he opens it and finds that Jake made sushi, which rotted while in transit. Jenny hooks up with a bikini wax technician named Brooke (Aly Michalka), who catches Jenny's heart, but gives her a fake phone number. After revealing her feelings to Walden, he visits Brooke's spa to get a painful wax, but gets Brooke to promise to call Jenny. On the night of their date, Jenny gets heavily intoxicated because she is nervous about a second date. Later, Brooke shows up, also intoxicated, because she, like Jenny, usually never does second dates. Alan is still with Paula and gets to meet her former wife, Rachel (Diane Farr), who takes a liking to Alan. After Paula tells Alan that they are not exclusive, he takes Rachel out and they run into a livid Paula. Rachel reveals to Paula that she only went out with Alan to make Paula jealous. After some convincing from Alan, Paula and Rachel get back together, albeit in a lesbian relationship. On Christmas Eve, Walden recites "The Night Before Christmas" Two and a Half Men style, with Alan imagining Rachel and Paula making out as he tries to go to sleep, Jenny and Brooke sleeping together, and Walden and Berta getting high on the sofa. Title quotation from: Jenny, while mixing a pitcher of alcoholic drinks to calm her nerves.
235	11	"Tazed in the Lady Nuts"	James Widdoes	Story by : Tim Kelleher & Jeff Lowell & Jim Vallely; Teleplay by : Don Reo & Jim Patterson & Steve Tompkins	January 2, 2014	4X5361	8.74
In the coffee shop, Alan relays to Walden his fear of public bathrooms. While there, Walden is approached by a beautiful former employee Nicole (Odette Annable), whom he once fired. She asks if he can help her launch a new start-up software project. Walden is skeptical, but after reading her proposal, he is excited and starts working for Nicole and her nerdy sidekick Barry (Clark Duke), who idolizes Walden. After Walden does not follow Nicole's instructions for the coding, believing his method to be superior, she fires him. Walden confirms that he and Nicole no longer have a working relationship, then kisses her before leaving. Jenny has trouble opening up to her lover Brooke, but in the end calls Brooke her girlfriend. After going on a hike with Jenny and Brooke, Alan urinates in the woods and ends up with a tick in his testicles that Brooke has to remove. Title quotation from: Nicole, to Walden after he talks about getting "tazed in the nuts."
236	12	"Baseball. Boobs. Boobs. Baseball."	James Widdoes	Story by : Don Reo & Susan McMartin & Leslie Shapira; Teleplay by : Jim Patterson & Matt Ross & Max Searle	January 9, 2014	4X5362	9.58
Walden wants to help Nicole on her project so she will have time to date him. The entire time, Walden and Nicole try to resist the other's affections, until Nicole's project proves successful: the first human thoughts spoken by a computer. Nicole then leaps into Walden's arms, and the two consummate their relationship while the computer voices their thoughts. Meanwhile, Alan goes to the movies alone and runs into Larry and Lyndsey. Larry offers to set up his friend "Jeff Strongman" (Alan) on a date with a co-worker named Gwen. Alan accepts, despite an angered Lyndsey trying to steer him away from it. Things start off good on a double-date, until Gwen (Brooke Lyons) is invited to a party and asks the other three to come along. When they arrive, they see everyone walking around half-naked, and Gwen casually announces that it is a swingers party. Playing along, Lyndsey says that she wants to sleep with "Jeff", leaving Larry to gladly hook up with Gwen. Lyndsey instead has sex with Jeff Probst rather than Jeff/Alan. Alan is left by himself, until he runs into Probst's grandmother (Marion Ross), and the two sleep together after she reveals that the party is for her. Title quotation from: This is the only time the quotation comes from someone non-human; it comes from Walden's computer saying his thoughts out loud, as he is trying to avoid thinking sexual things about Nicole.
237	13	"Bite Me, Supreme Court"	James Widdoes	Story by : Tim Kelleher & Jeff Lowell & Jim Vallely; Teleplay by : Don Reo & Jim Patterson & Steve Tompkins	January 30, 2014	4X5363	8.86
Marty proposes to Evelyn and asks Walden to be his best man. Walden throws Marty a bachelor party (which includes Marty's friends played by Garry Marshall, Steve Lawrence and Tim Conway), and Alan hires two strippers to give Marty a lap dance. After the lap dance Marty calls off the wedding and takes the strippers home. Alan and Walden visit Marty to get him to reconsider. Marty says he thinks Evelyn is wonderful, but after six failed marriages, he no longer believes that lasting love is possible. Marty thinks Alan and Walden are a couple, and he changes his mind after Walden proposes to Alan and his faith in love is renewed. After the wedding, Marty shocks Alan and Walden by announcing he has arranged for them to be married. Note: Dick Van Dyke of Carl Reiner's The Dick Van Dyke Show was due to appear in the episode but turned it down due to the number of genitalia jokes, and because he was not allowed to see a script beforehand. Title quotation from: Jenny's comment about the Supreme Court which legalized gay marriage and rid her of an excuse for a permanent relationship with her partners.
238	14	"Three Fingers of Crème de Menthe"	James Widdoes	Story by : Don Reo & Jim Patterson & Maria Espada Pearce; Teleplay by : Steve Tompkins & Saladin K. Patterson & Susan McMartin	February 6, 2014	4X5364	8.32
Alan learns from Lyndsey's boyfriend Larry that he had broken up with her two weeks ago. When Alan confronts Lyndsey, she tells Larry says does not want to reunite because he would not make a commitment. After some serious soul searching, Alan decides to ask Lyndsey to marry him. But when he arrives at Lyndsey's house, he finds Larry there proposing to her, partly because of Alan's encouragement. Jenny and Brooke tell Walden that he is not a "guy's guy" when he cannot change the tire on his car, so he dons a tool belt and starts to fix everything in the condo. Finally he rebuilds the deck out back, which later collapses while he is lounging on it. Title quotation from: Alan, who orders that after Larry orders whiskey at the bar.
239	15	"Cab Fare and a Bottle of Penicillin"	James Widdoes	Story by : Jim Patterson & Tim Kelleher & Jim Vallely; Teleplay by : Don Reo & Matt Ross & Max Searle	February 27, 2014	4X5365	10.02
Alan gives Lyndsey the option of choosing between him and Larry by proposing, and Lyndsey turns him down. He goes to visit his ex-wife Judith, and after they get drunk he proposes to her. She accepts, especially after seeing the size of the ring Walden had given him. Walden sees how badly Judith still treats Alan, so he tells Judith that she was the second person that Alan had proposed to that night, causing Judith to break up with him. Jenny is depressed that Brooke seems to be pulling away from her. On advice from Walden, she decides to give Brooke a surprise romantic gesture. She sets herself up in an S&M situation in Brooke's bedroom, only to have Brooke walk into the room with her parents. Title quotation from: Berta, describing Charlie's idea of romance.
240	16	"How to Get Rid of Alan Harper"	James Widdoes	Story by : Saladin K. Patterson & Jim Vallely & Leslie Schapira; Teleplay by : Don Reo & Jim Patterson & Jeff Lowell	March 6, 2014	4X5366	10.38
Alan is invited to be Larry's best man at Lyndsey's wedding and meets Larry's sister, Gretchen (Kimberly Williams-Paisley), who is like him in many ways. They start seeing each other, albeit with Alan having to date her as Jeff Strongman. Walden thinks that Nicole is cheating on him when he sees her having dinner with another man. The man turns out to be from Google, and he offered Nicole a job given that Google is working on a project similar to hers. She wants her whole team, including Barry and Walden, to go to San Francisco with her. Walden declines, saying the team has a chance to "be Google" rather than just work for them. Walden and Nicole break up, with Barry accepting the offer to join Nicole's team. But later, Barry shows up at Walden's house saying he too would rather "be Google", and he moves in. Title quotation from: When Alan prefers the life that his alter-ego Jeff Strongman has, he wonders how to get rid of Alan Harper.
241	17	"Welcome Home, Jake"	James Widdoes	Story by : Don Reo & Jim Patterson & Saladin K. Patterson; Teleplay by : Tim Kelleher & Matt Ross & Max Searle	March 13, 2014	4X5367	9.43
Alan (as Jeff Strongman) starts to date Larry's sister Gretchen, and is caught by Lyndsey and Larry having kinky sex in their living room. At dinner, Gretchen and Alan are all over each other, with Larry hoping that the two couples will be together forever. Finally, Lyndsey comes up to Alan and starts making out with him just outside Gretchen's door. Barry is staying with Walden, transitioning after Nicole leaves, and is supposedly looking for new projects to work on with Walden. Instead, he mostly hangs out with the other girls and gets stoned. Walden finds him another place to stay, and actually tells him to move out. Walden feels empowered after finally having the guts to throw someone out of his house, so he goes home to tell Alan to move out too, but finds Barry already back there visiting. Walden then stays in the apartment he rented for Barry, given that four other people are now living in the beach house. Title quotation from: Berta, thinking Barry is Jake.
242	18	"West Side Story"	James Widdoes	Story by : Don Reo & Jim Patterson & Susan McMartin; Teleplay by : Jeff Lowell & Matt Ross & Max Searle	April 3, 2014	4X5368	9.23
Walden's ex-girlfriend Kate (Brooke D'Orsay) has returned from China, and invites him to her boutique opening. The two agree to a dinner with "no strings attached", but after eating they soon find themselves wanting to have sex. Their passion is ruined, however, when both contract food poisoning. Meanwhile, after playing party games with Larry and Lyndsey, Gretchen says she wants to spend some time with "Jeff" at his place. Barry offers to stay in Alan's room at the beach house, allowing Alan to pretend Barry's apartment is his. Lyndsey sneaks into Alan's room in the dark and starts to get physical before realizing it is Barry in bed. When Lyndsey offers Alan sex again, Alan rejects her offer, saying he is falling for Gretchen and does not want to cheat on her. Gretchen tells him that she was hurt by her first husband because he lied to her like Alan has been doing. Later, Barry returns to his apartment while Alan and Gretchen are there, causing Alan to tell Gretchen that Barry is his son. Title quotation from: Gretchen, correctly guessing Alan's clue in a Pictionary-style movie identification game they are playing against Lyndsey and Larry.
243	19	"Lan Mao Shi Zai Wuding Shang"	James Widdoes	Story by : Jeff Lowell & Matt Ross & Max Searle; Teleplay by : Don Reo & Jim Patterson & Steve Tompkins	April 10, 2014	4X5369	9.55
After Kate leaves for a trip to San Francisco, Walden meets a hiker named Vivian (Mila Kunis) whose life is one outdoor adventure after another. He offers Vivian a meal and a place to stay for the night, and she leaves the next day. Realizing he has fallen for her, Walden breaks up with Kate and goes after Vivian. But Vivian is not interested in changing her lifestyle for Walden, and also tells him that he falls in love too easily. They part and Walden dreams about both women. Gretchen finally discovers Alan's secret about Jeff Strongman when she finds his wallet. She leaves him, despite admitting they have strong feelings and a lot in common. Later, Gretchen returns wanting to get to know Alan Harper, but not until after she kicks "Jeff" in the crotch. Title quotation from: Kate, when she picks up a call from her partner from China.
244	20	"Lotta Delis in Little Armenia"	James Widdoes	Story by : Don Reo & Steve Tompkins & Saladin K. Patterson; Teleplay by : Jim Patterson & Tim Kelleher & Jim Vallely	April 24, 2014	4X5370	9.35
Walden relates to Dr. Linda Freeman (Jane Lynch) the events of losing both Kate and Vivian; she instructs Walden to have a few casual encounters so that he does not feel enticed to proclaim that every beautiful girl who sleeps with him is "the one". Meanwhile, Alan tries to restart his chiropractic business in the beach house. When Alan gets caught in traffic and Walden is left with a female patient (Jamie Luner), Walden uses this as his opportunity for casual sex. The woman leaves after sex with Walden just as an apologetic Alan walks in. She says she is fine now, and pays Alan his fee anyway. Alan sees an opportunity to exploit this for money when Walden has sex with five more patients. Walden finds out about the scheme when a patient asks if she should just pay him directly, and he confronts Alan. Another female client shows up at the door and offers Alan money for sex with Walden. After Alan claims he is Walden, the client turns out to be a cop and arrests him. It turns out the "cop" was Jenny's acting coach, and she and Walden had set it up as payback. Title quotation from: Alan, after his first "Adjustments By the Sea" client tells him he saw his ad in his Little Armenia deli. Alan says he must be more specific, as he had advertised in several.
245	21	"Dial 1-900-MIX-A-LOT"	James Widdoes	Story by : Jim Patterson & Matt Ross & Max Searle; Teleplay by : Don Reo & Steve Tompkins & Susan McMartin	May 1, 2014	4X5371	8.97
Gretchen finally meets the rest of Walden's live-ins and wants Alan to tell her brother who he really is. Lyndsey does not want him to tell Larry that he is not Jeff Strongman since her wedding is two weeks away and it could break them up. Alan tells Gretchen that he cannot do it and she leaves Alan thinking that he is still in love with Lyndsey. Finally Alan goes to Lyndsey's house and asks Gretchen to be "Mrs. Alan Harper" in front of everyone, including Larry. Gretchen does not answer yet. Walden finds his Dad's old car for sale in Denver, which was also the first car Walden drove. He, Jenny and Barry fly to Denver to look at it at a pawn shop, owned by a pothead named Dirk (Diedrich Bader). With many memories attached to the vehicle, Jenny convinces Walden to buy it, and they head back to L.A. by car. Stopping in a motel, they get stoned on the pot they bought in Colorado and bond over good and bad memories about their dads. Title quotation from: Gretchen, singing "Baby Got Back" in a karaoke bar.
246	22	"Oh WALD-E, Good Times Ahead"	James Widdoes	Story by : Don Reo & Jim Patterson & Tim Kelleher & Jim Vallely; Teleplay by : Steve Tompkins & Jeff Lowell & Matt Ross & Max Searle	May 8, 2014	4X5372	8.35
Gretchen accepts Alan's proposal, while Larry breaks up with Lyndsey after learning that Alan lied about being Jeff Strongman and that Lyndsey never told him Alan was her old boyfriend. Larry does forgive Alan since he is going to be his brother-in-law, while Lyndsey is a mess upon realizing that two men had proposed to her only to both leave her. Using Larry and Lyndsey's wedding cake and food, Alan and Gretchen have their ceremony at Walden's beach house. Larry gets mad when he finds out that Alan and Lyndsey cheated on him, so Walden pushes him off the deck to buy time. Lyndsey shows up drunk and lands in the wedding cake. Gretchen's ex-husband Derek (Brad Paisley) then shows up thanks to Lyndsey calling him, and he wants her back. Unsure of her feelings for her ex, Gretchen leaves with him to figure things out, leaving Alan heartbroken and confused. Regardless, Walden admits that he wants Alan to continue living at the beach house with him, as the two have a chat on the couch. They make a pact to go back to the way things were when they met three years ago: just two friends hanging out. The final segment of the episode also breaks the fourth wall by having the two characters make references to the show’s then-scheduling and finally its name. Title quotation from: Walden talking to his artificial intelligent robot, as a reference to WALL-E.

== Critical reception ==
Sam Moore of Yahoo said: "Despite the criticisms and cast breakdowns, Two and a Half Men keeps surviving, and in my opinion, the show right now is the best it has ever been. Amber Tamblyn has helped breathe life into a show that always seems on the verge of the guillotine and her impact on the show, for me, has been huge and much welcomed." Due to Tamblyn's character being gay, the show received praise from the LGBT community who said "The folks who produce Two and a Half Men should be applauded for their efforts to raise some LGBT awareness amidst the often-madcap goings-on in their shows" and that "it keeps getting better and better".

The Gazette gave a positive review, especially for Kutcher, saying "I think Ashton Kutcher is doing a great job on Two and a Half Men." They also praised the "new LGBT angles the show has added." Overall they said the show "has never been better." They later praised the "new and contemporary directions the show is taking". They felt that this season could be remembered as "its finest", they also said it was "one of few shows that makes [us] laugh nowadays", and they hoped that the show gets renewed for another season. They said that "Two and a Half Men is brilliant, in a silly sort of way."

The Canadian online edition of TV Guide noted after the season finale only that the series had "come a long way" and that the series was no longer the reviewer's "cup of tea."

== Ratings ==
=== U.S. Nielsen and DVR ratings ===
Order	Episode	Viewers (millions)	18–49 Rating	Weekly rank	Viewers (millions)	Rating (18–49)	Total viewers (millions)	Total (18–49)
Order	Episode	Viewers (millions)	Live ratings		DVR ratings			
1	"Nangnangnangnang"	11.59	2.9	16	2.77	0.8	14.36	3.7
2	"I Think I Banged Lucille Ball"	9.34	2.4	—N/a	—N/a	—N/a	—N/a	—N/a
3	"This Unblessed Biscuit"	9.14	2.3	22	2.67	—N/a	11.81	—N/a
4	"Clank, Clank, Drunken Skank"	8.59	2.1	—N/a	2.93	1.1	11.52	3.2
5	"Alan Harper, Pleasing Women Since 2003"	8.53	2.3	—N/a	2.58	0.9	11.10	3.2
6	"Justice in Star-Spangled Hot Pants"	8.27	2.0	—N/a	2.61	1.0	10.88	3.0
7	"Some Kind of Lesbian Zombie"	8.66	2.1	—N/a	—N/a	0.9	—N/a	3.0
8	"Mr. Walden, He Die. I Clean Room."	8.69	2.1	25	2.44	0.9	11.13	3.0
9	"Numero Uno Accidente Lawyer"	8.47	2.3	22	2.30	0.8	10.77	3.1
10	"On Vodka, on Soda, on Blender, on Mixer!"	8.56	1.9	22	2.45	0.9	11.01	2.8
11	"Tazed in the Lady Nuts"	8.74	2.2	10	2.36	0.8	11.10	3.0
12	"Baseball. Boobs. Boobs. Baseball."	9.58	2.4	15	2.04	0.8	11.62	3.2
13	"Bite Me, Supreme Court"	8.86	2.0	21	2.37	0.8	11.23	2.8
14	"Three Fingers of Crème de Menthe"	8.32	1.9	25	2.38	0.8	10.70	2.7
15	"Cab Fare and a Bottle of Penicillin"	10.02	2.5	16	—N/a	—N/a	—N/a	—N/a
16	"How to Get Rid of Alan Harper"	10.38	2.6	14	—N/a	—N/a	—N/a	—N/a
17	"Welcome Home, Jake"	9.43	2.4	18	—N/a	—N/a	—N/a	—N/a
18	"West Side Story"	9.23	2.5	18	—N/a	—N/a	—N/a	—N/a
19	"Lan Mao Shi Zai Wuding Shang"	9.55	2.4	15	—N/a	—N/a	—N/a	—N/a
20	"Lotta Delis in Little Armenia"	9.35	2.5	14	—N/a	—N/a	—N/a	—N/a
21	"Dial 1-900-MIX-A-LOT"	8.97	2.1	—N/a	—N/a	—N/a	—N/a	—N/a
22	"Oh WALD-E, Good Times Ahead"	8.35	2.1	—N/a	—N/a	—N/a	—N/a	—N/a
