= Two and a Half Men season 12 =

Two and a Half Men
- Season 12
- DVD cover art
- Showrunners: Don Reo; Jim Patterson
- Starring: Ashton Kutcher; Jon Cryer; Conchata Ferrell; Edan Alexander
- No. of episodes: 16

Release
- Original network: CBS
- Original release: October 30, 2014 – February 19, 2015

Season chronology
- ← Previous; Season 11

The twelfth and final season of the American television sitcom Two and a Half Men aired on CBS from October 30, 2014 to February 19, 2015.

The season brought the show back to the way it originally began: two ill-matched men working together to raise a child.

== Production ==
Two and a Half Men was renewed for a twelfth season on March 13, 2014. It was announced on May 14, 2014 that it would be the final season of the show, making it one of the longest running live-action sitcoms on American television.

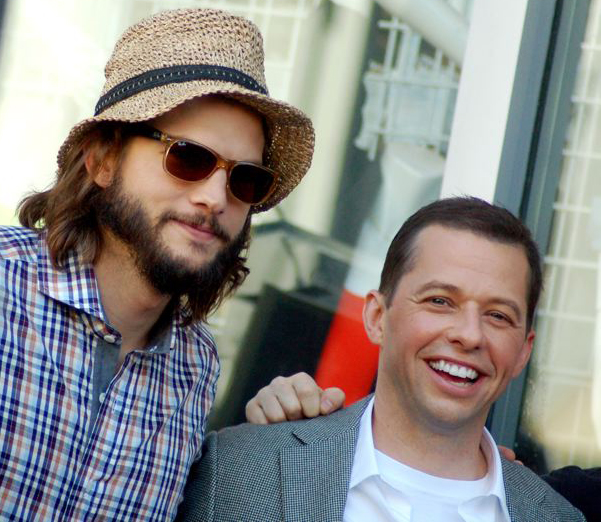
For the show's final season the focus was centered on the relationship between Ashton Kutcher and Jon Cryer's characters. The straight best friends decide to marry in order to fool the system and adopt a young child.

At the executive session panel at the Television Critics Association press tour in Beverly Hills on June 19, 2014, CBS President Nina Tassler announced the story arc for the season. During this season, which was described by Tassler as a season-long event to conclude the show by Chuck Lorre, Walden (Ashton Kutcher) would experience a health scare in the opening episode and, "he wants to find a way to add more meaning to his life, so he decides he wants to adopt a child and in doing so, he starts the process and realizes that it's very difficult to adopt a child as a single, straight man," Tassler said. "So once and for all he decides, 'I'm going to propose to Alan (Jon Cryer) and we're going to get married and adopt a child as a gay couple."

Show producer Chuck Lorre explained the future gay wedding as bringing the show full circle. Lorre said that the marriage would be about raising a child with 'a great deal of love' and not their sexuality. "You're going to see two men who are not gay but are going to raise a child with a great deal of love and attention. Their sexuality is irrelevant to loving and caring for a child, which maybe that's the big story that we wind up telling: taking a kid out of the system and giving him a home. What's better than that?" he added. He promised that there would be a wedding and hoped no offense would be taken. Lorre said that "this seems like the next logical step. Not romance, not sex, raising a child." Jon Cryer was reluctant to do the storyline when he first heard it, but was convinced when it was explained to him, further insisting the show was not mocking same-sex marriage, and instead would do it 'tastefully'. He also said, "Obviously we've cheapened plenty of things over the decade that we've been on the air. But that is something we're not intending to do." Cryer was vocally supportive of the storyline and the season, saying "it will be a heartfelt journey...there might be more of a heart to this season than ever before."

Charlie's daughter Jenny (Amber Tamblyn), who was introduced in season 11 as the new 'half man', appears in only three episodes this season.

Along with other sitcoms, this season aired from late October instead of the traditional September season starting month. This was because of Thursday Night Football. To avoid competition with the sporting event, some shows were held back until after its conclusion so the ratings would not be hurt.

Charlie Sheen, who was a previous cast member on the show, expressed his interest to reprise his role of the deceased character Charlie Harper in the series finale, and even stated that the producers liked the idea, "I've reached out to them and they've reached back," and added that he was "just a meeting away," from making it happen. Producers denied the statements, however, saying that no discussions had been made. Nina Tassler has said that there were no plans to have him back. In December, Sheen publicly criticized Lorre, nearly four years after first doing so saying, "Here's what sucks. I got clearance from the whole cast. Les Moonves. All the suits. There's one guy who's blocking it, guess who that is?" He even told Lorre to "get out of his own way." During an appearance on The Ellen DeGeneres Show on December 12, 2014, Ashton Kutcher refused to confirm whether Sheen would return for the finale, but gave provocative hints on the matter. Sheen posted a bitter, angry critique about the show on Twitter in January 2015. Despite this, at the Television Critics Association's winter press tour on January 15, 2015, Chuck Lorre spoke about the show and praised Sheen, "It would be inappropriate to not acknowledge the extraordinary success we had with Charlie and how grateful I am, we all are, to his contributions. And there's nothing but great feelings for the eight-and-a-half years we worked together." He said he wanted the finale to honour both eras of the show, and that there were "no wounds," following what happened with Sheen, saying "What happened, happened. And I'm grateful for the time we enjoyed working together and I'm very grateful Ashton came along and kept the lights on. What do I got to complain about? I'm so blessed."

On December 5, 2014, it was announced that the series finale would be on February 19, 2015, and it would be an hour long episode to conclude the series. CBS announced that the new incarnation of The Odd Couple, the premise of which Two and a Half Men was based on, would take its place for the remainder of the television season.

== Cast ==
Main article: List of Two and a Half Men characters

=== Main ===
- Ashton Kutcher as Walden Schmidt
- Jon Cryer as Alan Harper
- Conchata Ferrell as Berta
- Edan Alexander as Louis

=== Recurring ===
- Holland Taylor as Evelyn Harper
- Amber Tamblyn as Jenny
- Melanie Lynskey as Rose
- Courtney Thorne-Smith as Lyndsey McElroy
- Maggie Lawson as Ms. McMartin, the social worker
- Deanna Russo as Laurel
- Michael Bolton as himself
- Ryan Stiles as Herb Melnick

=== Guest ===
- Max Mittelman as Mechanical Demon
- Aisha Tyler as Allison, an adoption lawyer
- Clark Duke as Barry Foster
- D. B. Sweeney as Larry Martin
- Mimi Rogers as Robin Schmidt
- Alessandra Torresani as Kathy
- Jessica Lu as Jean
- Richard Riehle as Santa
- Bill Smitrovich as Rick
- Gary Anthony Williams as Leo
- David Denman as Jack
- Vernee Watson as Karen
- Arnold Schwarzenegger as Lt. Wagner
- Angus T. Jones as Jake Harper
- Marin Hinkle as Judith Harper-Melnick
- Jennifer Taylor as Chelsea
- Emmanuelle Vaugier as Mia
- April Bowlby as Kandi
- Missi Pyle as Mrs. Pasternak
- Judy Greer as Bridget
- Sophie Winkleman as Zoey
- John Stamos as himself
- Christian Slater as himself
- Bob Bergen as Porky Pig (cartoon sequence)
- Chuck Lorre as himself

== Episodes ==
No. overall	No. in season	Title	Directed by	Written by	Original release date	Prod. code	U.S. viewers (millions)
247	1	"The Ol' Mexican Spinach"	James Widdoes	Story by : Chuck Lorre & Lee Aronsohn & Warren Bell; Teleplay by : Don Reo & Jim Patterson & Steve Tompkins	October 30, 2014	T12.14951	10.29
Walden, dressed as Zombie Elvis, and Alan, dressed as Duckie from Pretty in Pink (a role Cryer actually played) but mistaken for Ferris Bueller, are preparing for a Halloween party when Walden suffers a mild heart attack. Alan and Berta both sit in the hospital waiting room and worry about their friend. Though the doctor says he should make a full recovery, Walden begins to rethink his life and decides he wants a child. He visits an adoption lawyer (Aisha Tyler), who tells him the system is rigged against single males adopting children. Having one failed marriage and two other women in his past who fled after he proposed, Walden is at an impasse, so he proposes to Alan. Title quotation from: Alan, referring to Walden's pot-smoking habit as he talks to the EMT in the ambulance.
248	2	"A Chic Bar in Ibiza"	James Widdoes	Story by : Lee Aronsohn & Don Reo & Jim Patterson; Teleplay by : Tim Kelleher & Saladin K. Patterson & Jim Vallely	November 6, 2014	T12.14952	9.12
After thinking about the proposal, Alan agrees to marry Walden. According to Walden, Alan has 9 out of the 10 things he wants in a spouse. They break the news to their mothers, Berta, and Jenny, who are all shocked by their announcement. As Alan is planning his perfect wedding, Walden nixes the elaborate ceremony and honeymoon plans. Walden explains that they have a "business deal" and the wedding will be in a courthouse. Walden then brings Alan a pre-nuptial agreement to sign. Alan is hurt that Walden doesn't trust him, and runs off in tears. Evelyn tells Alan not to sign anything, saying she didn't sign anything when she recently married Marty Pepper. Walden's mother Robin tries to set him up with either her female or male assistant. Alan returns home and they apologize to each other. Alan signs the document, agreeing that Walden is the only one with assets worth protecting, and they confirm to each other that they are best friends. To give Alan a memorable wedding, although it is with a judge, Walden gets Michael Bolton to sing. Walden surprises Alan with prepared vows and even kisses him after they are proclaimed married. Later, following a night of wild partying, Robin and Evelyn sneak out of the house after participating in a threesome with Bolton. Title quotation from: Alan, after Walden shoots down his honeymoon plans, wondering aloud if "Courthouse" is the name of a chic bar in Ibiza.
249	3	"Glamping in a Yurt"	James Widdoes	Story by : Saladin K. Patterson & Matt Ross & Max Searle; Teleplay by : Don Reo & Jim Patterson & Jim Vallely	November 13, 2014	T12.14954	8.75
Walden and Alan are scheduled to meet with social worker Ms. McMartin (Maggie Lawson) about adopting a child. Jenny says they will really have to "sell" their being a gay couple. She decides to move in with Evelyn while Walden and Alan prepare for adoption. When Ms. McMartin says she wants to visit the home, Walden and Alan "practice" being gay. Lyndsey complicates things when she returns after spending 60 days in rehab, and says she wants to get back together with Alan. Alan breaks the news that he is now married to Walden. On the day Ms. McMartin arrives and is in the kitchen discussing things, a now-drunk Lyndsey arrives at the door, saying that if Alan only married Walden to help him get a child, she and Alan can still have sex on the side. Alan quickly hides her in his bedroom where she passes out. She is later seen on the deck in just her bra as Walden and Alan try to distract Ms. McMartin. McMartin finally sees Lyndsey at the front door, but Jenny saves the day by pretending she is a neighbor and Lyndsey is her drunk friend. Later, Walden happily breaks the news to Alan that they have been approved to adopt. Title quotation from: Alan, describing to the social worker some of his favorite things to do with "Wally-bear".
250	4	"Thirty-Eight, Sixty-Two, Thirty-Eight"	James Widdoes	Story by : Don Reo & Jim Patterson & Steve Tompkins; Teleplay by : Warren Bell & Matt Ross & Max Searle	November 20, 2014	T12.14953	8.62
After Walden baby-proofs the house and it passes Ms. McMartin's inspection, she says there is a pregnant college student named Kathy who wants to give up her baby. Kathy meets Walden and Alan and feels they are the perfect couple to raise her child. Herb, Barry, and Larry join Walden and Alan to celebrate. A confused Larry somehow thinks Alan and Walden are having their own child. All the men go to the hospital to see the newborn. Walden gets to hold the baby boy, shortly before Kathy says she's changed her mind and wants to keep him. Title quotation from: Alan, describing the perfect woman as he discusses his pregnancy fetish.
251	5	"Oontz. Oontz. Oontz."	James Widdoes	Story by : Don Reo & Steve Tompkins & Warren Bell; Teleplay by : Jim Patterson & Tim Kelleher & Saladin K. Patterson	November 27, 2014	T12.14955	6.93
Ms. McMartin asks Walden and Alan if they would consider adopting a 6-year-old boy named Louis, and sets up a six-month trial after they accept. Walden tries very hard to make Louis feel at home, but the two don't get along as well as he hoped. After talking with Berta, who was also a foster child, Louis later climbs into Walden's bed and asks if Walden will make him leave after the weekend, as has happened to Louis many times before. Walden assures Louis that he can stay as long as he wants. Louis then wonders aloud why Alan is not in bed with Walden. First appearance of: Louis Title quotation from: Walden, imitating House music.
252	6	"Alan Shot a Little Girl"	Jon Cryer	Story by : Don Reo & Maria Espada Pearce & Nathan Chetty; Teleplay by : Jim Patterson & Steve Tompkins & Warren Bell	December 4, 2014	T12.14957	8.10
Ms. McMartin approves Alan and Walden to foster Louis for six months with a view to adopting him. She warns that Louis, being a foster child that has moved around a lot, may have some behavioral problems. Sure enough, Louis tries to manipulate Alan to get what he wants, which causes Alan and Walden to clash when Alan breaks Walden's rules in order to be the "cool" dad. After Louis continues to try to get what he wants by refusing to put a box of cereal back at the grocery store, Walden has Alan use some of his previous expertise with Jake to fix the situation. Both Alan and Walden keep the cereal for themselves in the end. Title quotation from: Louis, discussing Alan's behavior at laser tag and thus exposing Alan's lie to Walden about where they were.
253	7	"Sex with an Animated Ed Asner"	James Widdoes	Story by : Jim Patterson & Jim Vallely & Tim Kelleher; Teleplay by : Don Reo & Matt Ross & Max Searle	December 11, 2014	T12.14956	9.30
While Walden and Alan are both enjoying being parents to Louis, they're also increasingly exhausted by the little dynamo and take him to an indoor play center hoping he'll give them downtime while he plays with other kids. Alan ends up meeting a trio of attractive moms and they bring their kids to the beach house to hang out. Alan plays the married gay man to the hilt and ends up having a wild night out with two of the women, while Walden stays home to look after a sick Louis and is surprised when the other mom, Laurel, comes over. He tells her the truth about him and Alan and she seems to accept it; they nearly have sex, but Walden goes to look after Louis and ends up falling asleep next to him, so Laurel quietly leaves. Title quotation from: Walden, who is amused that single mom Laurel had a sex fantasy about the old man character voiced by Ed Asner in the movie Up.
254	8	"Family, Bublé, Deep-Fried Turkey"	James Widdoes	Story by : Warren Bell, Saladin K. Patterson, & Jim Vallely; Teleplay by : Don Reo, Jim Patterson, & Steve Thompkins	December 18, 2014	T12.14959	8.80
It is Christmas time and Rose comes over and offers her help, but is turned down. Louis does not believe in Santa as he never got presents, so Walden and Alan want to prove him Santa exists by hiring a Santa who will be captured on video. Unfortunately, while Alan and Walden are in the garage putting together Louis' new bike, sex between Evelyn and the fake Santa leads to a trip to the emergency room for the latter. Sometime later, Louis can't sleep, and asks Walden and Alan to stay with him; the two wind up falling asleep. In the morning, however, they discover all the presents under the tree and a video of Santa. Walden realizes Rose was responsible when he sees "Santa" leaping over the balcony railing. Rose tells Walden she really does want to be friends with him, and surprises Walden with a Christmas gift – a cuckoo clock (that, unknown to Walden and Alan, contains a spy cam). Title quotation from: Walden, summarizing what Christmas is all about.
255	9	"Bouncy, Bouncy, Bouncy, Lyndsey"	James Widdoes	Story by : Jim Patterson, Tim Kelleher, & Saladin K. Patterson; Teleplay by : Don Reo, Matt Ross, & Max Searle	January 8, 2015	T12.14958	10.07
Laurel brings her daughter to the beach house for a play date with Louis. After the kids fall asleep, she and Walden again attempt to have sex, but Louis interrupts. They later decide to get a hotel room while babysitters watch the kids. Just as they are getting intimate, Laurel hints that Louis has trouble sharing while Walden retorts that Laurel's daughter is a biter. The two argue, then have angry sex. Meanwhile, Herb has just completed Alan's physical exam, and says Alan really needs to exercise more. He suggests Alan come to his yoga class, which has the added benefit of being surrounded by hot women. One of the "hot women" they see there turns out to be Lyndsey. After Alan and Lyndsey argue a bit, Herb asks if he can pursue Lyndsey, given that the she and Alan are no longer together. Despite agreeing it would be a bad idea and a violation of the "bro code", Alan finds that Herb did indeed sleep with Lyndsey when he goes to apologize to her later. Title quotation from: Alan, while staring at a woman on an exercise ball, before realizing it's Lyndsey.
256	10	"Here I Come, Pants!"	James Widdoes	Story by : Chuck Lorre, Don Reo, & Jim Patterson; Teleplay by : Tim Kelleher, Matt Ross, & Max Searle	January 15, 2015	T12.14960	9.38
During a surprise check up, Ms. McMartin sees a half-dressed Laurel emerge from Walden's room, and is angered to discover that he and Alan were pretending to be a gay couple. She plans to remove Louis from the house. In a desperate attempt to change her mind, Alan tries to reason with her, which somehow leads to them having sex and the social worker complaining about her life and occupation. Walden becomes devastated over losing Louis and eventually has to say good-bye when Ms. McMartin comes to pick him up. However, as she is about to leave with Louis, she changes her decision upon seeing how happy Louis is with them, and agrees to let him stay so long as Alan and Walden tell her no more lies - unless her boss asks about them. She and Alan end up in bed again; afterwards, Alan asks her what her first name is, but her answer is not heard. Title quotation from: A pants-less Walden, trying to hide his secret from Ms. McMartin after Laurel calls to him.
257	11	"For Whom the Booty Calls"	James Widdoes	Story by : Warren Bell, Saladin K. Patterson, & Jim Vallely; Teleplay by : Don Reo, Jim Patterson, & Steve Tompkins	January 22, 2015	T12.14961	9.31
Alan sleeps with Ms. McMartin again, and tells Walden about it the next morning. Walden is furious, thinking their relationship might jeopardize the adoption of Louis, which is still pending. Walden joins a support group of adoptive fathers so that he can discuss his concerns. He and the group's four members hit it off, and Walden is happy to have friends other than Alan to talk with. When the group meets at the beach house, Walden hurts Alan's feelings by telling him he'd prefer to have Alan leave for the day rather than join the group. When Alan invites himself to join, however, Walden gets annoyed when the group takes a liking to Alan. Title quotation from: Alan, bragging to Walden about having sex with Ms. McMartin.
258	12	"A Beer-Battered Rip-Off"	James Widdoes	Story by : Don Reo, Jim Patterson, & Jeff Lowell; Teleplay by : Matt Ross, Max Searle, & Nathan Chetty	January 29, 2015	T12.14962	9.71
Lyndsey, returning some of Alan's things, announces she is moving away for a fresh start. After they have sex, Alan asks her to get back together and she says she will think about it. Walden is worried since Alan is also having sex with Ms. McMartin, so Alan breaks up with her. A furious Ms. McMartin shows up in the middle of the night for a surprise inspection of the beach house. While Alan and Lyndsey are dining, Ms. McMartin shows up, causing both women to become furious with Alan. Walden goes to talk to the distressed Ms. McMartin, but he ends up having sex with her and she becomes convinced that they have started a relationship. Alan seems to have won Lyndsey back after showing up at her house holding up a boom-box. Title quotation from: Alan, discussing the price of tilapia at the restaurant where he and Ms. McMartin are dining.
259	13	"Boompa Loved His Hookers"	James Widdoes	Story by : Steve Tompkins, Warren Bell & Jeff Lowell; Teleplay by : Don Reo, Jim Patterson & Nathan Chetty	February 5, 2015	T12.14963	9.39
After Alan and Lyndsey reconcile, she starts looking for an apartment and then asks Alan to move in with her. No apartment is good enough for Alan who then admits that his perfect place is Walden's beach house. Lyndsey leaves after he chooses the beach house over her. Walden breaks up mutually with Ms. McMartin and then officially adopts Louis. Realizing that the two of them are going to end up alone together and that their women are perfect for them, Alan goes running after Lyndsey at the airport and Walden asks Ms. McMartin for another chance. She agrees after being serenaded by Michael Bolton. Alan ends up being hit by a taser by a TSA guard as he tells Lyndsey that he loves her. Title quotation from: Walden's comment about his hooker-loving grandfather.
260	14	"Don't Give a Monkey a Gun"	James Widdoes	Story by : Don Reo, Jim Patterson & Tim Kelleher; Teleplay by : Jim Vallely, Matt Ross & Max Searle	February 12, 2015	T12.14964	9.33
As both couples are getting along together, Walden decides he wants to get divorced from Alan and move on. Walden gives Alan a wish because he was such a good friend in helping him adopt Louis. Alan gets a Ferrari, which makes Lindsey mad, as both she and Walden think Alan should have wished for something that included Lyndsey. Alan decides to propose to Lindsey — especially after Walden offers to buy the engagement ring. Walden in turn offers nothing but support, but then panics that he might truly end up alone if he lets Alan move out so he frantically begs Alan to stay at the beach house forever. Alan, surprisingly, declines but assures Walden that they will always be friends and he'd still come to visit. Lastly, Alan finally proposes and Lyndsey at first balks, but she happily says yes upon seeing the huge diamond in the ring. Title quotation from: Walden's comment about giving Alan the opportunity to make poor choices.
261	15	"Of Course He's Dead"	James Widdoes	Chuck Lorre, Lee Aronsohn, Don Reo & Jim Patterson	February 19, 2015	T12.14965	13.52
262	16	"Of Course He's Dead"	James Widdoes	Chuck Lorre, Lee Aronsohn, Don Reo & Jim Patterson	February 19, 2015	T12.14966	13.52
Alan tries to prove Charlie is dead in order to collect $2.5 million in back-royalties, but has no proof other than Rose's word. Evidence begins to mount that Charlie is still alive. The royalty money is claimed, threatening notes are received. Jenny, Jake, Chelsea and friends of Charlie receive mysterious checks for large cash amounts along with written apologies. Alan receives a FedEx package addressed to Charlie containing whiskey, cigars, and a knife with which Charlie used to chase Alan. Rose confirms that Charlie is indeed alive (though deranged and brainwashed), explaining how, after catching him cheating, a goat saved Charlie when Rose tried to throw him into the path of an oncoming train, following which she returned Charlie to America and held him captive. Evelyn and Rose then go into hiding while Alan and Walden go to the police, returning home to find the house vandalized with more threats. Jake drops by for a visit and tells a surprised Alan and Walden that he left the Army, is now married and living in Japan and has turned his $250,000 into $2.5 million in Vegas. The police say they have captured Charlie, but the suspect is Christian Slater. Alan, Walden and Berta relax in lounge chairs while they smoke Charlie's cigars and drink his whiskey. They observe a helicopter carrying a piano approaching the house. Charlie, seen only from the back, approaches the front door and the piano falls on him. The episode ends as the camera pulls back from the set to where producer Chuck Lorre is sitting, upon which he turns around and says "winning", only to have a second piano fall on him, ending the series. The episode has several cases of characters—particularly Alan and Walden—breaking the fourth wall with references to the show’s evolution. Title quotation from: Alan's response to Walden asking if he is sure Charlie is dead.

== Critical reception ==
Two and a Half Men, a show that has always generated controversy, continued to do so in its final season. The producers were aware that the story line for the season might cause controversy (despite saying that was not their intention), which it did. However, Nina Tassler defended the show, saying "I think it's a very positive statement," "[Walden believes he is] going to adopt a child as a gay couple, and the reality is he can do that. In a universe where at one point you couldn't do that, and now you can, I think that's a much more positive statement that he's making."

Ciara Doll of "The IDS Newspaper" criticized the beginning of the season, saying that it "felt flat". Jillian Page of Montreal Gazette praised the overall story arc for the season, believing the story was "redefining marriage" in the real world. He believed Chuck Lorre to be a "genius", for "turning convention upside down". He believed the story line to be a "warm", and "noble" one. Jim Slotek of Niagara Falls Review was positive that the show was trying to "make sense again in its final season" in terms of bringing the show back to where it started, two men trying to raise a young child.

== Ratings ==
=== U.S. Nielsen and DVR ratings ===
Order	Episode	Viewers (millions)	18–49 Rating	Weekly rank	Viewers (millions)	Rating (18–49)	Total viewers (millions)	Total (18–49)
Order	Episode	Viewers (millions)	Live ratings		DVR ratings			
1	"The Ol' Mexican Spinach"	10.29	2.4	17	—N/a	—N/a	—N/a	—N/a
2	"A Chic Bar in Ibiza"	9.12	2.1	23	—N/a	—N/a	—N/a	—N/a
3	"Glamping in a Yurt"	8.75	2.1	—N/a	—N/a	—N/a	—N/a	—N/a
4	"Thirty-Eight, Sixty-Two, Thirty-Eight"	8.62	2.2	23	—N/a	—N/a	—N/a	—N/a
5	"Oontz. Oontz. Oontz."	6.93	1.5	—N/a	—N/a	—N/a	—N/a	—N/a
6	"Alan Shot a Little Girl"	8.10	1.9	19	1.79	—N/a	9.94	—N/a
7	"Sex with an Animated Ed Asner"	9.30	2.3	16	—N/a	—N/a	—N/a	—N/a
8	"Family, Bublé, Deep-Fried Turkey"	8.80	1.9	15	1.95	0.8	10.76	2.7
9	"Bouncy, Bouncy, Bouncy, Lyndsey"	10.07	2.3	16	—N/a	—N/a	—N/a	—N/a
10	"Here I Come, Pants!"	9.38	2.1	16	—N/a	0.8	—N/a	2.9
11	"For Whom the Booty Calls"	9.31	2.2	11	1.92	0.7	11.25	2.9
12	"A Beer-Battered Rip-Off"	9.71	2.3	16	1.90	—N/a	11.61	—N/a
13	"Boompa Loved His Hookers"	9.39	2.3	18	—N/a	—N/a	—N/a	—N/a
14	"Don't Give a Monkey a Gun"	9.33	2.1	18	—N/a	0.9	—N/a	3.0
15/16	"Of Course He's Dead"	13.52	3.2	8	2.99	1.0	16.51	4.2
