= Nangnangnangnang =

- Two and a Half Men episode
- Episode no.: Season 11; Episode 1
- Directed by: James Widdoes
- Written by: Chuck Lorre & Susan McMartin
- Production code: 4X5351
- Original air date: September 26, 2013

Guest appearances
- Kelly Sry as Henry; Lilah Richcreek as Keri

Episode chronology
← Previous "Cows, Prepare to Be Tipped"	Next → "I Think I Banged Lucille Ball"
- Two and a Half Men season 11

"Nangnangnangnang" is the eleventh season premiere of the American sitcom Two and a Half Men and the 225th episode overall. The first appearance of Amber Tamblyn as Charlie Harper's estranged daughter, Jenny, the episode was written by series co-creator Chuck Lorre and Susan McMartin and directed by James Widdoes. It originally aired on September 26, 2013, on CBS.

Charlie Sheen’s real-life daughter Sam played Lisa’s (Denise Richards) daughter in Season 2, Episode 9, “Yes, Monsignor.”

== Plot ==
Alan is interviewing a young man named Henry to be his assistant when a woman knocks on the door. The woman reveals herself to be Charlie's daughter Jenny. She reveals that Charlie was paying her monthly checks without telling anyone, up until he died. She decided to get into acting to spite her mother and only went to medical school to steal medication. Walden later meets Jenny, then shows her his room and tries to seduce her, but with no luck.

Alan calls his mother Evelyn about Jenny, and she heads to the house, but not before Alan shows Jenny Charlie's ashes (then spills them). Berta then tells Jenny stories about Charlie while they wait for Evelyn, who upon arriving, begins making plans for the two of them. She, Alan, and Walden argue over where she will be staying, until they notice that she has left. They eventually find her at a bus stop, where she says that she only wanted to meet her family and leave, hoping not to cause a stir. Alan and Evelyn then insist she stay with them.

The four of them go to the bar where Jenny was allegedly conceived, where she convinces an attractive waitress to come with them back to Walden's house. Walden feels grateful for this supposedly kind action, assuming that the waitress was for him. It turns out that Jenny picked her up for herself, since she is actually a lesbian, and takes the waitress upstairs to have sex in Walden's bedroom - reminiscent of what happened the first time Walden spent the night. The others are left puzzled, while Evelyn proclaims "Charlie's back!" (suggesting that Charlie the womanizer has returned in the form of Jenny) The next morning, Walden bitterly enters the kitchen, complaining to Alan about Jenny forcing him to sleep in the guest room. Jenny and the waitress then walk into the kitchen barely dressed, which arouses Walden.

== Production ==
Tamblyn's addition to the cast was confirmed on August 7, 2013, and she was slated to appear in the season opener. Although the role was announced as a series regular, it began as a recurring role with the option to become a series regular later. In regards to her first sitcom role, Amber said to Entertainment Weekly "My learning curve was pretty steep because I’d never done a sitcom before. I’ve always infused comedic stuff into any dramatic roles I’ve done, but this is a whole — to quote Disney’s Aladdin — a whole new world."

This is also the first episode of the series to not feature Angus T. Jones as Jake Harper as a main cast star. CBS announced in April 2013 that he would be downgraded to recurring status for season 11, but he never made an appearance. However, he does return in season 12 as a guest star for the series finale, the only episode to feature both Jones and Tamblyn.

On October 2, 2013, Tamblyn was officially promoted to series regular for the season after only one episode.

== Reception ==
=== Ratings ===
The episode was watched by 11.59 million viewers in its original American broadcast and received a 2.9 rating/8 share in the 18–49 demographic. This episode is down significantly from the tenth-season premiere in viewers and ratings. The show placed fourth for the night behind The Big Bang Theory, The Crazy Ones, and Grey's Anatomy.

Including DVR viewing, the episode was watched by an additional 2.32 million viewers and received an 18–49 rating of 0.8, bringing the total viewership to 13.91 million viewers with an 18–49 rating of 3.7.

=== Critical reception ===
The episode received generally positive reviews, with most critics agreeing that Amber Tamblyn is a great addition to the cast and great in the role. CarterMatt said "We do find the potential for comedy here to be pretty high with Tamblyn, she was a pretty funny addition to the group" and that "we feel better about Jenny being on the show now than we would Jake if he was still turning up", but adds "Two and a Half Men minus Charlie Sheen is best when Walden's at the helm, and having too much Harper may serve as a reminder of how much Charlie is missed."

Zap2it named Jenny's line "I hate the sun. It's like God calling you an alcoholic" one of the best lines on TV for September.
