= Frannie's Turn =

Television series

- Genre: Sitcom
- Created by: Chuck Lorre
- Written by: Chuck Lorre
- Directed by: Sam Weisman; Asaad Kelada
- Starring: Miriam Margolyes; Tomas Milian; Stivi Paskoski; Phoebe Augustine; Alice Drummond
- Composer: Michael Linn
- Country of origin: United States
- Original language: English
- No. of seasons: 1
- No. of episodes: 6 (1 unaired)

Production
- Executive producers: Marcy Carsey; Caryn Mandabach; Tom Werner; Chuck Lorre
- Producer: Miriam Margolyes
- Editors: Joe Bella; Frank Mazzaro
- Camera setup: Multi-camera
- Running time: 30 minutes
- Production company: Carsey-Werner Productions

Original release
- Network: CBS
- Release: September 13 – October 10, 1992

Frannie's Turn is an American sitcom television series that aired on CBS from September 13 to October 10, 1992. The series was the first show Chuck Lorre ever created, after his time as a writer for Roseanne.

== Synopsis ==
Set on Staten Island, New York, Frannie Escobar (Miriam Margolyes) is a homemaker whose life is making her crazy. But with laughter, wisdom and plenty of heart, Frannie copes with the ups and downs of everyday life with her cantankerous Cuban husband Joseph (Tomas Milian), his eccentric mother, their dim-witted son, and their headstrong daughter. In a house where the sexes battle, the cultures clash and the generation gap is unbridged, life is lively, unpredictable and always entertaining.

== Cast ==
- Miriam Margolyes as Frannie Escobar
- Tomas Milian as Joseph Escobar
- Phoebe Augustine as Olivia Escobar
- Stivi Paskoski as Eddie Escobar
- Alice Drummond as Rosa Escobar
- Taylor Negron as Armando
- LaTanya Richardson as Vivian

== Episodes ==
No.	Title	Original release date
1	"Pilot"	September 13, 1992
2	"Money Talks, Olivia Walks"	September 19, 1992
3	"Sex and Saints"	September 26, 1992
4	"How Do You Say Death in Spanish?"	October 3, 1992
5	"Gentlemen, Wrap Your Guava"	October 10, 1992
6	"Frannie and the Kitchen Sink"	Unaired
