= Black Widow Murders: The Blanche Taylor Moore Story =

1993 American drama film by Alan Metzger

- Based on: Preacher's Girl by Jim Schutze
- Written by: Judith Paige Mitchell
- Directed by: Alan Metzger
- Starring: Elizabeth Montgomery; David Clennon; John M. Jackson; Grace Zabriskie; Bruce McGill; Mark Rolston
- Composer: David Michael Frank
- Country of origin: United States
- Original language: English

Production
- Producers: Patricia Finnegan; Sheldon Pinchuk
- Cinematography: Geoffrey Erb
- Editor: Seth Flaum
- Running time: 92 minutes
- Production companies: Andrea Baynes Productions; Finnegan/Pinchuk Productions; Lorimar Television

Original release
- Network: NBC
- Release: May 3, 1993

Black Widow Murders: The Blanche Taylor Moore Story is a 1993 American television drama film directed by Alan Metzger and written by Judith Paige Mitchell. It is based on the 1993 book Preacher's Girl by Jim Schutze. The film stars Elizabeth Montgomery, David Clennon, John M. Jackson, Grace Zabriskie, Bruce McGill and Mark Rolston. The film premiered on NBC on May 3, 1993.

Based on the true story of a North Carolina woman who murdered her first husband and a lover with arsenic.

A woman marries her boyfriend on his deathbed for his money so she can move on to the next guy. When he turns up mysteriously ill the police step in and investigate the strange circumstances.

== Cast ==
- Elizabeth Montgomery as Blanche Taylor Moore
- David Clennon as Dwight Moore
- John M. Jackson as Raymond Reid
- Grace Zabriskie as Ethel
- Bruce McGill as Morgan
- Mark Rolston as O'Keefe
- Guy Boyd as Kevin Denton
- John Philbin as Ray Jr.
- Phoebe Augustine as Cathy
- Matt Ryan as Stevie
- Katy Boyer as Lujane
- Thomas Mills Wood as Doug
- Paul Collins as Dr. Nesbitt
- Lisa Blake Richards as Linda Reid Sykes
- E.R. Davies as Rev. Jim Rosser
- Henry Brown as Officer Daniels
- Lynn Llewelyn as Victoria
- Stephen Root as Dr. Kirby
- Tim Halligan as Dr. Gardner
- Patricia Belcher as Nurse Kitty
- Wendy Way as Nurse Amy
- Michael Chieffo as Harvey
- Rick Scarry as Raymond's Attorney
- Rick Hall as Deputy Sheriff Bob
- Erika Rosenzweig as Dwight's Daughter
