= Of Course He's Dead =

- Two and a Half Men episodes
- Chuck Lorre looks at the audience and exclaims "Winning!" after a piano falls over "Charlie", just when a second piano is about to fall on him. Critics were mixed as this was an anti-climatic ending while also praising its self-referential comedy.
- Episode nos.: Season 12; Episodes 15/16
- Directed by: James Widdoes
- Written by: Chuck Lorre; Lee Aronsohn; Don Reo; Jim Patterson
- Production codes: T12.14965; T12.14966
- Original air date: February 19, 2015
- Running time: 38 minutes

Guest appearances
- Angus T. Jones as Jake Harper; Melanie Lynskey as Rose; April Bowlby as Kandi; Jennifer Taylor as Chelsea Melini; Courtney Thorne-Smith as Lyndsey McElroy; Maggie Lawson as Ms. McMartin; Emmanuelle Vaugier as Mia; Missi Pyle as Dolores Pasternak; Judy Greer as Bridget Schmidt; Sophie Winkleman as Zoey Hyde-Tottingham Pierce; Arnold Schwarzenegger as Lt. Wagner; Bob Bergen as Porky Pig; John Stamos as himself; Christian Slater as himself; Chuck Lorre as himself

Episode chronology
← Previous "Don't Give a Monkey a Gun"	Next → —
- Two and a Half Men season 12

"Of Course He's Dead" is the two-part series finale of the long-running American sitcom Two and a Half Men, which ran for 12 seasons. The episode aired on CBS on February 19, 2015, as an hour-long program, and serves as the 15th and the 16th episode of the twelfth season and the 261st and the 262nd episode of the series overall. The episode, written by series creators Chuck Lorre and Lee Aronsohn, along with Don Reo and Jim Patterson, and directed by James Widdoes, had the show's largest audience since April 2013, with 13.52 million viewers watching the episode, along with a 3.2 rating/9% share in the 18–49 demographic. In this episode, Alan Harper discovers that his brother Charlie, presumed to have been killed in a train accident in the ninth season premiere, has a fortune in unclaimed royalties. He eventually gathers enough evidence to confirm that Charlie is still alive and is planning a grand act of revenge. Former cast members Angus T. Jones, April Bowlby and Jennifer Taylor make cameo appearances, along with Arnold Schwarzenegger as Lieutenant Wagner.

== Plot ==
Alan Harper receives a letter stating his presumed dead brother Charlie has $2.5 million in unclaimed royalties. He needs Charlie's death certificate to claim the money, but cannot find one and realizes his only proof is Rose's word. Evidence that Charlie may be alive mounts after an unknown party claims the money, and Alan and his mother Evelyn receive threatening messages. Meanwhile, Charlie's estranged daughter Jenny receives a check for $100,000 along with an apology note, and a package addressed to Charlie arrives at the house. Several women from Charlie's past are shown receiving checks and personalized apology letters.

An unknown captive escapes Rose's basement, so Rose returns to the beach house to inform Alan and Walden Schmidt that Charlie is alive. While in Paris, Rose caught Charlie in bed with a hooker, a mime and a goat. She tried to avenge his infidelity by pushing him into the path of an oncoming train, but the goat took the fall instead. Rose imprisoned Charlie in her dungeon, where she raped him, until he escaped. Evelyn and Rose go into hiding, while Walden and Alan go to a police station and talk to Lieutenant Wagner. Returning to the house, they find life-size cardboard cutouts of themselves wearing nooses with targets on the chests. Frightened, Alan calls his ex-wife Judith and several past girlfriends to tell them how much they each meant to him. Walden also calls two of his ex-girlfriends to apologize for how he behaved with each. All the women feign emotion while being generally dismissive.

Alan's son Jake shows up at the house, having left the Army and married a Japanese woman. He mentions having received a $250,000 check and a note reading, "I'm alive" before gambling with the money in Las Vegas, yielding $2.5 million in winnings. After Jake leaves, Wagner calls Alan and Walden to tell them he has captured Charlie, but the man is actually Christian Slater dressed in attire similar to Charlie's. Alan, Walden and Berta, believing Wagner, celebrate. A helicopter carrying a grand piano like Charlie's approaches the house, and the three ponder whether Wagner caught the right man, but quickly brush it off. Charlie, seen only from the back, walks up to the front door and rings the bell. However, before anyone answers, Charlie is killed when the helicopter drops the piano on him. The camera then pulls behind to reveal the series' set with Chuck Lorre sitting in the director's chair. The series ends when Lorre turns his head to the outgoing audience and breaks the fourth wall by saying: "Winning!", just seconds before a second grand piano falls on him.

== Production ==
Prior to the finale, there was much speculation over whether former star Charlie Sheen would reprise his role as Charlie Harper. CBS had not announced who would guest star on the episode. At the Television Critics Association's winter press tour on January 15, 2015, Chuck Lorre spoke about the show and had nothing but praise for Sheen, saying, "It would be inappropriate to not acknowledge the extraordinary success we had with Charlie and how grateful I am, we all are, to his contributions. And there's nothing but great feelings for the eight-and-a-half years we worked together. But how to wrap the show up, it's tricky. It's a tricky—it's a sticky wicket. Because, in a way, the show morphed into something else entirely for the last four years, and it's something we love, and we want to honor both. So, how to honor both has been the challenge of this finale. The other challenge is how to get people watching it without telling them what it is," he explained. He said he wanted the finale to honor both eras of the show, and that there were "no wounds," following what happened with Sheen, saying "What happened, happened. And I'm grateful for the time we enjoyed working together and I'm very grateful Ashton came along and kept the lights on. What do I got to complain about? I'm so blessed." When asked about the finale and the possibility of Sheen's return, Lorre responded, "I think viewers will be very, very satisfied with the finale. That's all I'm going to say." Further teasing as to Sheen's return was given with the reveal of the episode's title, "Of Course He's Dead".

CBS President Nina Tassler said that Lorre had planned a "mystery sandwich" for the final episode. The episode was taped on February 6, 2015 and aired on February 19, 2015. It took two weeks to film. Lorre approached the finale with the intention of doing "everything we could to make a finale worth watching."

Jon Cryer revealed that while shooting for the finale, "there was a shoot day when they conspicuously called me and said, 'You're not in it.' I was like, What? What's happening that day?" Cast members were not even allowed to read the whole script and did not see the episode in its entirety until its airdate. According to Cryer, filming for the episode was very emotional, and the finale is unlike any finale he's ever seen before. The animated flashback sequence that filled in the gaps between season 8 and season 9 was created by an outside company from Warner Bros. Unusually for sitcoms shot in front of a live studio audience, the episode was shot out of sequence; it was just a couple of scenes, rather than the usual full episode, in order to shield surprises. Lorre told the audience members that, "You probably won't know what we're doing." Even Lorre got emotional when introducing the episode to the audience: "It's been an unbelievable experience. I'm getting a little … So, I'm going to stop." Each scene was clapped with the slate by former and current executive producers, including Lorre and Lee Aronsohn. Ashton Kutcher said that the episode felt more like an early episode of the show from its first two or three seasons, pointing to the involvement of Lorre and Aronsohn with Don Reo and Jim Patterson, saying, "I felt their presence in the writing, there was a little different bite to it." More than 100 people who work on the show crowded onto its living room set for a group photo.

Lorre said that everybody "had a blast making it" and that the finale was "an attempt to acknowledge everything that we've been through and everything that people have come to expect from the show". He said that no expense was spared for the finale as they didn't need to worry about the budget as they were ending the show anyway and so producers just "went for it". In order to prevent plot details and secrets from being leaked, guest actors were only given the pages they were involved in and certain lines were redacted. Before 2011, the idea of how the show might end was envisioned as a teary sendoff of Jake to college.

The show was shot on Warner Brothers Stage 26, which was renamed "The Two and a Half Men Stage".

Lorre subsequently revealed in his vanity card that Sheen had been offered a cameo where he would walk up to the door of the beach house, recite a rant about the dangers of drug use and his own invincibility, at which point his character would be killed by a falling piano. Sheen declined, and the scene was filmed with a stand-in, shot from behind, and without dialogue. When discussing the infamous last scene, Lorre said that deciding to put himself in the final shot "felt like comedically the right thing to do. It's like 'Nobody gets out of here alive' may be the theme of this series. The proposition that anybody wins in something like this is ridiculous. That would have felt uncomfortable to me. So the second piano felt like the right thing to do".

== Vanity card ==
Chuck Lorre's signature vanity card, shown at the end of the episode:

I know a lot of you might be disappointed that you didn't get to see Charlie Sheen in tonight's finale. For the record, he was offered a role. Our idea was to have him walk up to the front door in the last scene, ring the doorbell, then turn, look directly into the camera and go off on a maniacal rant about the dangers of drug abuse. He would then explain that these dangers only applied to average people. That he was far from average. He was a ninja warrior from Mars. He was invincible.

And then we would drop a piano on him. We thought it was funny. He didn't. Instead, he wanted us to write a heart-warming scene that would set up his return to primetime TV in a new sitcom called The Harpers starring him and Jon Cryer.

We thought that was funny too.

== Reception ==
=== Ratings ===
"Of Course He's Dead" was a 60-minute episode that originally aired on February 19, 2015, on CBS. The series finale was viewed by 13.52 million viewers and received a 3.2 rating/9% share among adults between the ages of 18 and 49. This means that it was seen by 3.2 percent of all 18- to 49-year-olds, and 9 percent of all 18- to 49-year-olds watching television at the time of the broadcast. This marked a significant increase, of over four million viewers, in the ratings from the previous episode, "Don't Give a Monkey a Gun". It also ranks as the highest rated episode of the season, as well as the highest-rated episode for the series since the tenth season entry "Bazinga! That's from a TV Show", which was viewed by 13.71 million viewers and received a 3.9/12% share. The episode ranked second in its timeslot, being beaten by the American political thriller television series Scandal on ABC.

=== Critical reception ===
"Of Course He's Dead" received mixed reviews, with praise for the premise, cameo of the cast and meta-humor, but criticism for the rushed season finale and anti-climax. Entertainment Weekly found it to be a good piece of television, "some of the unrelenting boldness inherent in the self-referential nature has to be applauded". They praised its unapologetic overtly self-referential meta approach: "Two and a Half Men never beat around the bush with its humor, with its awareness of what the audience thought of its actors. The finale celebrates that with being one of the most meta episodes of television ever devised; like it or not, Two and a Half Men won't apologize for ending that way". Overall they thought "'Of Course He's Dead' is certainly one of the most fascinating finales to air."

Max Nicholson of IGN gave it a 3.5 out of 10, saying: "I don't think I could come up with a worse ending than a faceless Charlie Harper walking up to the front doorstep of Alan's home, a grand piano falling on his head, and then a pull-out to Chuck Lorre sitting in his director's chair and turning around to say, 'Winning!' — and then a grand piano falling on his head...". They did however praise the clever meta-humor.

James Poniewozik of Time, on the other hand, gave a positive review of the finale, saying: "Its bawdy, sentimentality-free goodbye was a funny and deeply weird hour of score-settling, fourth-wall-breaking, hugs-and-tears-denying TV". Overall they felt "the show went out not with a 'Farewell, old friend' but with a 'See you in hell!'. Was it appropriate? Classy? I just know I laughed".

Corey Barker of TV.com gave the episode a positive review. He thought "it was a legitimately funny episode of television that toyed with viewers' expectations all the way up until the last millisecond", as to whether or not Charlie Sheen would appear, which is what the episode was teasingly building up to. He argued that "it sure was fascinating. And for Two and a Half Men, that's a very fitting way to go out". He believed "Of Course He's Dead" to be more creative and clever than the show ever was: "For a sitcom that I never found to be creative or even clever, Two and a Half Men peppered its final hour with some really amusing — if obvious — moments". He also thought that the fact Sheen never showed up "made the finale's self-aware trolling even more successful."

Hollywood Life gave a positive review, saying they "were still laughing through the entire hour finale of the sitcom". They also enjoyed the self-referential jokes at the expense of the actors and show itself.

Daniel Fienberg of HitFix gave the episode a mixed review, saying: "The only people who lost were fans who watched an hour of the Two and a Half Men finale waiting for Charlie Sheen only to see a body double get flattened by a baby grand." However, he did "chuckle a couple times."

Variety gave a negative review of the episode, saying: "Diving into the business side of the show so relentlessly felt seriously misguided — and more than a little defensive", and that "while the sendoff addressed a certain kind of 'Winning', in the grand pantheon of series finales this wasn't even close to serving up a winner.

Andrea Reiher of Zap2it felt that it was "a funny series finale", but was disappointed that Sheen didn't appear.

Michael Hewitt gave the episodes a positive review saying, "Now, that's how you do a finale." He believed the show closed 'in style'.

Emily St. James of Vox gave a positive review: "You almost had to admire its sheer willingness to follow its vision off the cliff... it's an utterly bonkers episode of television". In the end she had much respect for the episode, saying: "I was never a huge fan of Two and a Half Men, but I am struck with a weird respect for this episode, which realized it was in a hole and just kept digging. Most American sitcoms end with big group hugs and couples reuniting. But the Two and a Half Men finale is an utterly whacked-out tribute to the series it caps. It gives absolutely no shits, and it's kind of glorious."

=== Charlie Sheen's reaction ===
Charlie Sheen, former star of Two and a Half Men, hated the episode and took offense to the closing vanity card which prompted an outspoken rant on Lorre, saying:

That's just him. I don't care anymore. I don't care if he lives or dies. Doesn't matter. Doesn't matter. Seriously, it doesn't even matter. To go that low and be that immature and that completely unevolved and that stupid? In my face, Really? You must feel safe, motherfucker. You must feel safe where you live. Damn!
