= Charlie Harper (Two and a Half Men) =

Fictional character from the TV series Two and a Half Men

- Two and a Half Men character
- Charlie Sheen as Charlie Harper in "Damn You, Eggs Benedict"
- First appearance: "Most Chicks Won't Eat Veal" (2003)
- Last appearance: "Of Course He's Dead" (2015) (Note: Although Charlie Harper appears in the series finale, Charlie Sheen did not reprise the role. Last credited appearance was That Darn Priest.)
- Created by: Chuck Lorre
- Portrayed by: Charlie Sheen

In-universe information
- Full name: Charles Francis Harper
- Aliases: Charlie Waffles; Dr. Charlie Harper; Dr. Philip Gonzalez; Gonzalez; Bo Jingles; Monkey-Man; C. Roscoe Harper
- Occupation: Jingle composer Children's music performer
- Family: Frank Harper (father; deceased); Evelyn Nora Harper (mother); Alan Harper (brother); Harry Luther Gorsky (stepfather; deceased); Don Thomas (stepfather; deceased); Luther King (stepfather; deceased); Nathan Krunk (Teddy Leopold) (stepfather; deceased)
- Significant others: Lisa (ex-girlfriend); Rose (wife until death); Mia (ex-fiancée); Judge Linda Harris (ex-girlfriend); Courtney Leopold/Sylvia Fishman (ex-fiancée); Chelsea (ex-fiancée)
- Children: Jenny (daughter)
- Relatives: Jake Harper (nephew); Gloria (possible half-sister); Milly Melnick (possible niece); Judith Harper-Melnick (ex-sister-in-law); Kandi Harper (former sister-in-law); Walden Schmidt (former brother-in-law); Silvia (aunt); Sophie (aunt); Jerry (cousin); Faye (married to Jerry); Phoebe (cousin) "Crazy" cousin Wendy (cousin); Walter (uncle); Louis (adopted nephew)

Charles Francis "Charlie" Harper is a fictional character in the CBS sitcom Two and a Half Men during the first eight seasons of the series. Played by actor Charlie Sheen, the character of Charlie Harper is loosely based on Sheen himself. The show has garnered him four Primetime Emmy Award nominations for Outstanding Lead Actor in a Comedy Series and two Golden Globe nominations for Best Performance by an Actor in a Comedy Series. Although the character was written off after the end of the eighth season, the character was reprised for one episode of the ninth season by Kathy Bates, which resulted in her winning the Primetime Emmy Award for Outstanding Guest Actress in a Comedy Series and in the series finale, "Of Course He's Dead".

After being expelled from Juilliard School, Charlie moved back to Los Angeles with the intention of becoming a film composer. He met a commercial producer who listened to Charlie's work; thus began his career writing jingles. His most famous composition is the Maple Loops song. He then became a successful composer and singer of children's music under the alias "Charlie Waffles" when the jingle business dried up. He can be frequently seen playing the Steinway grand piano in his living room. The piano was later removed from the house by Walden Schmidt.

Charlie prides himself on his bachelor/playboy lifestyle in Malibu, California and drives a Mercedes, and used to own a Jaguar. He was also thinking of buying a Ferrari F430 or a Bentley. His lifestyle consists of living in a two-story beachfront house, drinking excessively, smoking cigars, womanizing and gambling constantly, and wearing shorts and bowling shirts. He sleeps in constantly and retains a full-time housekeeper, Berta. Money "falls into his lap" as he lives a life of free-spirited debauchery. He has a vast range of phobias, including stage fright (unless he is drunk), commitment, his mother, spiders, large birds, germs, change, and hard work.

Following Sheen's dismissal from the series in March 2011, the character was written off in the ninth season, with his wife Rose implying he was killed by a train in Paris while on vacation. Charlie's ghost, portrayed by Kathy Bates, returns as a hallucination to Alan, revealing that he is living in Hell trapped in a woman's body. However, in the series finale, "Of Course He's Dead," Rose reveals that Charlie had been alive all along (albeit brainwashed) and she was keeping him prisoner in the basement of a house that she purchased in Sherman Oaks after returning to the United States. He escapes from Rose's basement and returns to the beach house. As he rings the doorbell, a piano that is being transported by helicopter falls from the sky, killing him.

Both the character and Sheen's portrayal received a positive reception, with critics and fans feeling he was the best character on Two and a Half Men.

== History ==
When Charlie's mother Evelyn was pregnant with him (for 7 and a half months), his parents thought that he was going to be a girl, since the ultrasound showed no signs of a penis. By Charlie's own admission, he was a 'preemie' or born prematurely (Alan too) because, as he put it, "my mother waits nine months for NOTHING". According to Evelyn, Charlie was always "a little drama queen" when he grew up. After his father died of food poisoning, Charlie and his brother Alan had three stepdads. The first, Harry Luther Gorsky, left Evelyn for a young woman (Charlie refers to Harry as "a little tyrant"), and Evelyn was also present at his funeral, the second was a twitchy gay man from Texas who called him and Alan "buckaroos", and the third was "the Carpet King", a fat man whom Charlie liked the most because he had "a grateful daughter". Well into his 40s, Charlie believed "the Carpet King" owned a carpeting business until his mother explained that the man's name was actually sexual slang rather than his profession.

When Charlie was young, he was embarrassed by his younger brother Alan; on Alan's first-ever day of school, Charlie told everyone at school that Alan was his shaved monkey (he later explained he did this because he always wanted a shaved monkey). He also gave his brother frequent wedgies and bullied him whenever he could. Charlie has dependably had a troubled association with Alan, and would go to all expenses to escape being a decent sibling to him. As a child, Charlie once put a toy in Alan's pocket to shop-lift, and when they got caught, he influenced Alan to assume the fault. Charlie drank a lot when he was a teenager, was a chain smoker, and constantly ran away, nevertheless his mother did not mind because he always came back, and generally did not care about her sons. He once even, when he was 16, drove to Tijuana, Mexico with a school nurse. When he was 17, he almost married a woman whom he thought was the love of his life, but relented. Charlie says that if he did not, he would at that point be married to a "65-year-old retired belly dancer". Charlie constantly criticizes Alan and Jake's presence in his house, but generally seems happy that they are around, because they are the only people who have known him for a long time and accept his unconventional life. When Alan was surprised to find that Charlie did not have their mother's cell phone number in his contacts list, Charlie told him "If I can't eat it, bang it or bet on it, it's not in my phone." On a later episode, it is shown Charlie does have his mother's number. He has it on the speed dial address that he finds appropriate for her, "666".

Charlie and Alan have an estranged relationship with their mother and try to avoid her at all costs; Charlie refers to her as "a Satan". Not much is known about their biological father, Francis Harper, except that when Charlie thinks back he says he was a horrible son to him. Evelyn, even after multiple marriages, still keeps her first husband's name (Harper). Charlie also once had a hallucination of his father Francis telling him to take care of his mother, which horrified him, but when he saw an old gangster film, he realized that he "misunderstood"; his father actually wants him to kill her when he can manage this.

Charlie is often unappreciative towards Alan. In one episode he made Alan go on a date in spite of being sick with the flu, merely in order to afford him (Charlie) the opportunity to have "revenge sex". In another episode when Alan got upset in a bookstore and wanted to miss a movie that they were going to see Charlie replied, "So I'm supposed to miss the movie just because you had a nervous breakdown. Don't you think that is a little selfish, Alan?" Furthermore, after Alan's second divorce Alan tells Charlie that he needs him in front of a crowd of people to which Charlie retorts, "Anyone know a Charlie?" He additionally derives enjoyment from rubbing his own success in Alan's face and further worsening Alan's situations just for the fun of it. He is particularly critical about Alan's situation with Judith, especially since he told Alan not to marry her and tried to bribe him with a $1000 prostitute.

While Charlie cares about his nephew Jake and, at the beginning of the show, used him to get dates, he often makes jokes about Jake's apparent lack of intellectual ability, and often states that he is destined to be a doorstop or a fry cook, and states that he is not a kid, but a "gassy dwarf". Nevertheless, it is often shown that Charlie genuinely loves Jake, and sometimes acts like a father to him, giving him advice, that Alan is unable to give. In the episode "Ate the Hamburgers, Wearing the Hats" Jake gets an injury and Charlie goes out of his way to make sure that he's safe. In the episode "The Mooch at the Boo" Jake and his neighbor, a pretty girl named Celeste, disappear together and Celeste's father, ex-football player Jerome (Michael Clarke Duncan), comes looking for them; when they're found kissing, Charlie tells Jerome that he'll take the beating intended for Jake.

Despite his selfish attitude, Charlie can be caring at times. Though Charlie often scolds Alan for being a "sponge", he has continued to provide two out of his three bedrooms to Alan rent-free, and seemingly provides all of his meals, even when the two dine out together. In many occasions, he has stood up to Jake on behalf of Alan when Jake started roasting his father.

Charlie watches a lot of sports on TV, but has little interest in athletics per se; rather, Charlie is a frequent gambler. He watches sports to keep tabs on his investments, and bets on horse races, football matches, etc. Two of his favorite sitcoms are Dharma and Greg and Becker.

Despite his upper class and playboy persona (or because of it), Charlie can be remarkably naïve about everyday matters. In "Last Chance to See Those Tattoos," Alan observes that Charlie does not really understand how the Internet works. In "I Can't Afford Hyenas," Charlie is shown to have no understanding of how to care for his own living expenses because he entrusts an accountant with managing his cash flow and paying the bills. The accountant reveals his bills cannot be paid because Charlie has no savings due to spending his residual checks on his lavish lifestyle as soon as he receives them. Charlie becomes aware of his financial problems after he receives notices from the bank that his accounts are delinquent, his credit cards are maxed out and his car is in danger of being repossessed. He has never done his own laundry, and has no idea how a washing machine works; he genuinely believes Alan when he sarcastically says that the machine will call him when the cycle is complete. In the final few months of his life after Chelsea left him, he reverts to his old ways: drinking heavily, gambling, smoking marijuana to help him sleep and partying hard for hours. This began to affect him psychologically and physically; he aged considerably, gave himself a bad haircut and broke several toes, and received a black eye from one of his trips to Las Vegas. He eventually admits that his behavior is a way to cope with depression and loneliness.

== Reported death ==
Charlie Harper was reported by Rose to have died in Paris after being struck by a train. The season 9 premiere featured his funeral with one of Charlie's trademark bowling shirts and a pair of cargo shorts hanging by his closed casket. Rose explained that he had proposed to her in Paris and the next few days had been happy, but when she returned from shopping one day, she found him showering with another woman. The next day he fell off a Paris Métro platform and was struck by a train, his body exploding "like a balloon full of meat". It is implied by Rose and suggested by Berta that Rose was responsible for Charlie's death.

=== Aftermath ===
Charlie's ghost (as portrayed by Kathy Bates)

Following his funeral, Charlie has been frequently mentioned by his surviving (though very few) loved ones. It tends to be in a disrespectful manner and secrets and previously unknown details about his life emerge.

After his funeral his ashes are delivered and Alan decides to spread them on the beach but spills them after being scared at seeing Walden Schmidt at the window, soaking wet. In "Those Fancy Japanese Toilets", Charlie is shown to have kept a private journal. He kept it in a safe deposit box at the bank, and after he died, the bank contacted his mother about it. She gives the journal to Alan, who becomes fascinated with it, as the entries give an insight to a whole new side of Charlie that he never saw before. It is revealed that Charlie had postulated about the various causes of his death, including liver failure and being pushed in front of a bus, and that he questioned his condescending behavior towards women. It's revealed that when Charlie first met his nephew Jake, he believed that he was to have a bright future ahead of him, but secretly thought he was not Alan's biological son (implied by him to Alan years prior). It is also hinted that, despite all the criticism and abuse, he actually idolized his brother and missed him when he moved in with Lyndsey, however he knew at the same time that he would be back "before long".

In "Thank You for the Intercourse", Walden redecorates the house and therefore donates Charlie's piano to an orphanage. Alan suffers a mental breakdown, after realizing how much he misses Charlie and starts to act like him because of it, even picking up women with much success. Jake and Walden are worried about Alan's strange behavior and Walden then brings Alan to a mental institution after tricking him into believing that they were going for a trip to Las Vegas and that he stayed at the Bellagio penthouse suite.

Charlie is re-introduced into the series in the episode "Why We Gave Up Women", portrayed by Kathy Bates. While Alan is hospitalized for a mild heart attack, he awakens to find a strange woman sitting at the foot of his bed, dressed like Charlie and smoking a cigar. She also introduces herself as Charlie. Still not convinced, Alan asks her questions that only the real Charlie could answer, and she does so correctly. Charlie proceeds to explain that he ended up in Hell, and, as part of his punishment, must live eternity in the body of a large, older woman, albeit with a pair of testicles (he does not consider his new form all bad, as he is able to grope his own breasts). Charlie advises Alan to turn his life around and become self-dependent for once. After the meeting, Alan decides to rent an apartment, which is very low-grade. The following night, Charlie reappears to Alan, and admits that he did not care if Alan changed, but was happy that even though he is dead, he was finally able to get him out of his house. Later, after Alan fakes a second heart attack, in the hospital, Charlie appears to Jake, trying to hint who he is after addressing him by his old pet name "Tater Head", but Jake fails to understand. Annoyed, Charlie goes back to Hell, escorted by two women, where he wistfully complains about not having a penis anymore.

According to Chuck Lorre, the show's producers were so impressed with Bates performance, that they were considering bringing her back in the recurring role of "Alan's demonic spirit guide". Bates did not return to the show after this appearance.

Charlie is mentioned briefly in the season 10 episode "A Big Bag of Dog", when Walden has an emotional breakdown upstairs in the master bedroom over a breakup, Berta says that Charlie used to have emotional meltdowns over breakups in that bedroom, too. He is mentioned in the season 10 episode "That's Not What They Call It in Amsterdam" when Rose returns, Alan asks Walden if she told him that she was stalking his brother, and again when Rose is unsure whether to date Walden as he lives in Charlie's house, but Walden insists that has nothing to do with Alan or himself. He is referenced to by Walden in "Something My Gynecologist Said" when he is talking about this fake book he is writing, about a man called Alan who lives with his brother in a beach house, but the brother dies by being pushed in front of a train, and a billionaire comes and buys the house. Berta mentions him in "I Scream When I Pee", when saying that she did not think she could work for anyone besides Charlie, but says that Walden is the greatest boss she ever had, after he comes to cheer her up on her birthday and buys her a car. Alan briefly mentions him in "Advantage: Fat, Flying Baby". He is mentioned again in the season 10 finale, "Cows, Prepare to Be Tipped", when Alan reveals that Charlie left Jake two of his last cigars for when Jake graduates college. Alan and Jake smoke them and laugh heartily. In "Big Episode. Someone Stole a Spoon", after a wild party at the beach house leaves an intense mess with wreckage, Walden come out into the living room and says, "It looks like Charlie Sheen's house!", referencing not the character, but the actor himself.

=== Daughter ===
In season 11, a woman knocks on Walden and Alan's door, and introduces herself as Jenny, Charlie's daughter, which surprises Alan to the point of shock, as he never knew that he had a daughter, but amuses Walden. According to Jenny, the last time she saw him alive was at her fourth birthday. Hurt because Charlie did not want to marry her, Jenny's mother banned him from ever seeing Jenny again. Wanting to somehow provide for Jenny, Charlie would send a lucrative check to the family every month up until his passing. Alan reveals to Jenny that he kept his brother's ashes and put them in the liquor cabinet. He spills his ashes twice in the same day but is happy when he finds two quarters in them. It is also the first time Walden mentions Charlie by name, after previously only referring to him as "your brother" or "Alan's brother", and he wishes there was something other than Alan that Charlie would have left behind. Berta begins to tell Jenny stories of Charlie's life but Walden stops her and asks if she has any stories for Jenny that do not include drugs, alcohol or hookers, Berta is unable to recall anymore stories than ones that include those things. Later at Pavlov's, Jenny, Walden, Alan and Evelyn toast to Charlie as a father, brother, son and guy who bought his beach house after he was hit by a train.

In the second episode, Evelyn tells her boyfriend that she was not the greatest mother to Charlie and Alan, and that she wants to make up for it with Jenny. She asks Jenny if she wants to see pictures of her father at the police station, as they will have more pictures of him than she ever took. Walden talks to Charlie's ashes for the first time in season 11, asking him for a sign of advice on what to do about his love life and thanks him for the house, stating, "you'd have to be on crack to give all this up". Jenny claims that in her entire life, Charlie only wrote to her once asking "Are your friends 18 yet?"

=== Return ===
In the series finale, "Of Course He's Dead", Rose confesses that Charlie is not dead but survived her attempt to kill him after she found him having sex with a hooker, a mime, and a goat on their honeymoon. Rose binds and gags Charlie and they return to the United States where she brainwashes him and confines him to a pit under her house in Sherman Oaks. He escapes after four years, collects $2.5 million in royalty money, and sends messages to Alan, Evelyn, and Walden, warning of his imminent return and threatening revenge against them. He also sends Jenny, his former girlfriends, Berta, and Jake generous checks. In the last moments of the finale, Charlie is seen walking (only shown from the back) to the door of his beach house, when a helicopter is transporting Charlie's grand piano and just as he is about to ring the doorbell of the beach house, the piano drops and Charlie disappears once and for all. No one was particularly happy that Charlie was alive because he was planning to kill them, and because the characters had moved on with their lives and become a closer family unit than they had been when Charlie was alive and lived there.

Despite speculation that Charlie Sheen would make a cameo appearance, he does not appear in the program. Instead, Sheen's likeness is depicted via animation as a re-enactment of events when Rose is explaining what happened in Paris and by a stand-in in the last scene which only shows Charlie from behind.

According to showrunner Chuck Lorre, writing in the vanity card that appeared at the end of the episode, Sheen was offered a role in the finale where he would have "walked to the front door in the last scene, ring the doorbell, then turn, look directly into the camera and go off on a maniacal rant about the dangers of drug abuse. He would then explain that these dangers only applied to average people. That he was far from average. He was a ninja warrior from Mars. He was invincible. And then we would drop a piano on him. We thought it was funny. He didn't. Instead, he wanted us to write a heart warming scene that would set up his return to primetime TV in a new sitcom called The Harpers starring him and Jon Cryer. We thought that was funny too."

== Love life ==
Charlie's love life is a recurring theme in his character. He is an alcoholic womanizer who has engaged in decades of frequent one-night stands, prostitution, casual sex, and short-term relationships, in stark contrast to his brother Alan's inability to garner much female attention. Even though Charlie usually never calls any of his partners again after he had sex with them, there are a few relationships on the show that lasted longer than one night, such as his neighbor Rose, who continues to stalk him after they spent one night together, and Jake's ballet teacher Mia, whom Charlie was actually in love with, and almost married in Las Vegas. He usually dated much younger women, but starting in season 5, he pursued relationships that were a change of pace for him. He started a relationship with a respected judge played by Ming-Na and later with a substantially older single mother/author (Susan Blakely), neither of which lasted. In season 6, Charlie proposes to his girlfriend Chelsea (Jennifer Taylor, who has also played three other roles in earlier seasons) just to get her to return his love for her. But eventually turns out that it was the only love of his life when he dumped Mia and confessed his love for Chelsea. They remain engaged throughout season 7 until Charlie throws up on a baby, forcing Chelsea to dump him and leaving Charlie heartbroken. At the end of season 8 he goes off with Rose on a romantic getaway to Paris after getting married.

== Love interests (in order of appearance) ==
=== Rose ===
Charlie and Rose (Melanie Lynskey) spent one night together shortly before the events portrayed in the show; after this, Rose became increasingly obsessed with him. She usually spends time at his beach house when Charlie and Alan are gone, and when they come back they usually find a surprise, such as cabinets that are glued shut. Rose demonstrates her obsession with Charlie in numerous ways: when taking up with Charlie's pizza boy Gordon, she flaunted him to Charlie in an obvious but useless attempt to make the latter jealous; she then attempted to mold Gordon into Charlie by dressing him in short pants and designer bowling shirts like those Charlie usually wears, and instructing him to try to emulate Charlie's poses; she has named all of her five ferrets Charlie. Rose's father (portrayed by Sheen's real-life father Martin) became similarly obsessed with Charlie's mother Evelyn; Charlie and Evelyn sought "expert" assistance (i.e., Rose) to get rid of him. Charlie is usually charmed by Rose, but is not interested in a relationship with her, even though Berta thinks they are a good couple together. When Rose decided to leave to go to London Charlie believed that she was only pretending in order to get him into a relationship with her; after she really left, Charlie realized that he made a horrible mistake by letting Rose go. He then went to London to meet her but quickly returned home when Rose started talking about his moving there and starting a family together. Rose has since returned to Malibu and continues to stalk Charlie. As of "The Devil's Lube," there is a chance of a future relationship between the two; in this episode Charlie points out that he has not seen Rose in a while, but she cannot say the same. In "Above Exalted Cyclops," Rose, after being set up by Chelsea, now has moved on from Charlie and is stalking Alan, or possibly stalking both brothers. In "Gumby with a Pokey" (her only appearance in Season 7), she is still noted as Charlie's stalker, implying that she is either done stalking Alan and back to Charlie, or stalking both brothers. Gordon is unaware of Rose's brief relationship with Alan. In Season 8's "The Crazy Bitch Gazette," Rose is again stalking Charlie. This time it has become too much for Charlie's new girlfriend Michelle, who is convinced that Charlie loves Rose. Rose tells Charlie that she is marrying a guy named "Manfred Quinn," which appears to be verified when Charlie and Alan go to the church and peer through a door window to see a wedding in progress. The two walk away, with Charlie confused and apparently heartbroken. At the end of the episode, it is revealed that, with the exception of the priest and Rose, all the other attendants are mannequins (hence the name of Rose's purported groom: Manfred "Manny" Quinn). Later in Season 8, Charlie tells Rose that he loves her and they begin a romantic relationship with Charlie even taking her on a romantic getaway to Paris despite the fact that he still thinks she is truly married. Rose implied she killed Charlie in Paris after it is revealed she caught him having an affair. Charlie had proposed to her in Paris also which was mentioned by Rose at Charlie's funeral and Rose said yes to the proposal. In "That's Not What They Call It in Amsterdam", Rose begins a relationship with Walden, and after "Ferrets, Attack!" begins stalking him and ruining his life. During "Of Course He's Dead", she mentions that he cheated on her shortly after they married, and a goat prevented his death at the last moment.

=== Jill/Bill ===
Bill (Chris O'Donnell) was a previous girlfriend of Charlie's appearing in a season one episode, "An Old Flame with a New Wick". Bill had since had sexual-reassignment surgery and was formerly living as Jill. Charlie comments during the episode that while the relationship was passionate, sex with Bill was "a little weird". As the episode progresses, Bill begins dating Charlie's mother Evelyn (she is initially unaware of Bill's history). Once Bill's identity is revealed to her, she faints, but decides to continue seeing Bill. Bill was never seen or mentioned again.

=== Lisa ===
Lisa (Denise Richards) was Charlie's favorite ex-girlfriend on the show. In real life, after meeting in 2000 and marrying in 2002, the couple welcomed their first child, daughter Sam Sheen, in 2004. Lisa appeared in one season 1 and one season 2 episode. In "Merry Thanksgiving," Charlie proposed to her but she decided to marry another man. In "Yes, Monsignor," Charlie had to prove that he is capable of caring for babies when he found out that she had one (played by Richards' and Sheen's real-life elder daughter Sam). She was absent at Charlie's funeral.

=== Delores Pasternak ===
Miss Delores Pasternak (Missi Pyle, also Alicia Witt in season 6) was Jake's fifth-grade teacher. Charlie charmed her to save Jake from suspension for flipping her off, but she proved to be a domineering/school-marm type, driving Charlie to break up with her, after which she had a meltdown that got her fired from teaching and disowned by her family, leaving her to become a bikini dancer. After running into each other four years later (see "A Jock Strap in Hell"), Charlie feels guilty about this and hires her as Jake's private tutor, leading them to resume their romantic relationship. She quickly reverts to her religious self and Charlie breaks up with her again. She was seen at Charlie's funeral, where she mentioned he made tea using her panties.

=== Isabella ===
Isabella (Jodi Lyn O'Keefe) was Charlie's Goth girlfriend, known to bring a dark atmosphere with her. She and several of her girlfriends "anoint" Charlie as their king in a ceremony, "bonding" them for life. It's revealed that she knows Evelyn from Pilates class, and Isabella was unaware that Charlie and Alan are Evelyn's sons. Isabella was at Charlie's funeral, where she mentions that Charlie gave her herpes.

=== Kandi ===
Charlie had a brief relationship with Kandi (April Bowlby, credited as "Kymber"), after which she married his brother Alan. Kandi is 22 years old as of the season 3 episode "Ergo, the Booty Call", and is portrayed as a "dumb blonde" stereotype, although she is a redhead.

=== Mia ===
Mia (Emmanuelle Vaugier) is a ballet teacher to whom Charlie was engaged for a short while. Charlie decided not to marry Mia after she insisted that Alan and Jake must move out of the house, only to find out that Alan had married Kandi and moved out. Charlie later became depressed and sexually reckless when he learned that Mia was going to marry someone else. Charlie blamed Alan for ruining everything, but later realizes that he was just looking for an excuse to get out of the marriage. They reunited in person at the end of season 6's "Baseball Was Better With Steroids," resulting in a cliffhanger for the season finale. In season 7's premiere "818-jklpuzo", Mia appears in much less favorable light. Mia asks Charlie for help with a singing career, but in reality she appears to want him back. By this time, Charlie had begun a relationship with Chelsea, and is now torn between the two. While in the studio recording a demo tape, Mia asks Charlie for sex after revealing that she is a horrible singer. Charlie tells Mia she cannot sing, and chooses Chelsea. As Charlie rushes away, he turns off Mia's microphone so that he cannot hear her yell and swear at him. Mia was at Charlie's funeral, demanding to see the body.

=== Lydia ===
Shortly after he canceled his wedding to Mia, Charlie began dating a rude real-estate agent named Lydia (Katherine LaNasa). Alan, Jake, Rose, and Berta did not like her and made this clear to Charlie, but when she met his mother Evelyn, the four realized that she and Evelyn were exactly alike in character. Bobby, the waiter at Charlie's and Evelyn's favorite restaurant, was the first to recognize Lydia's similarity to Evelyn. When Lydia began to boss Berta around, Berta threatened to quit unless Charlie broke up with Lydia, who meanwhile threatened to break up with him unless he fired Berta. In the end, Charlie broke up with Lydia, and Berta would only return if Charlie admitted his sexual addiction and attended rehab. At Charlie's funeral, Lydia mentions that Charlie loved to be spanked.

=== Myra ===
Myra (Judy Greer) is the sister of Dr. Herb Melnick, Judith's second husband. She bonded with Charlie over their hatred of Judith. Judith did not want the two dating, and would take her frustration out on Alan. Judith did not want Charlie coming over to her house either, so Charlie invited Myra to his house. Although she was supposed to be sleeping in Jake's room, Myra slept with Charlie, leaving Alan and Jake to hear them and find out the truth. When Charlie wanted to pursue the relationship, he was heartbroken to learn that she was engaged and he'd have to drive her to the airport after the wedding, and that he'd never see her again. Greer appears in Season 9 as Walden's ex-wife.

=== Linda Harris ===
At the beginning of the fifth season, Charlie dated Judge Linda Harris (Ming-Na), a judge of his own age. Their relationship ended in the middle of the same season, after Linda concluded that she could not "be connected publicly to a guy like [Charlie]" after he publicly humiliated her (under the influence of his mother's "medication") at an event held in her honor. The random songs which Charlie sang to her son Brandon while babysitting essentially launched his show-biz persona, "Charlie Waffles".

=== Courtney Leopold/Sylvia Fishman ===
Charlie also fell for his future stepsister "Courtney" (Jenny McCarthy) in Season 5, and after agreeing to stop seeing her because they were about to be related, he lends her a substantial amount of money and proposes moments before they become step-siblings. She also forced Charlie to buy a car from her so the secret of their relationship would not get out to her father and Evelyn. Charlie is heart-broken to learn that she is actually a con artist named Sylvia, but he apparently retains feelings for her, telling her that he will "wait" for her (to get out of prison). She reappears in Season 8's "Ow, Ow, Don't Stop" (as Courtney) after being released from prison, and Charlie immediately falls for her again, even professing his love for her. Courtney and Charlie break up two episodes later in "Chocolate Diddlers or My Puppy's Dead" when they realize they have simply lost their feelings for each other and, in an extremely rare case for Charlie, they part mutually and on good terms, although surprisingly she holds a lot of resentment towards him at his funeral in the season 9 opener. In the season 9 episode "Nine Magic Fingers", Courtney starts dating Walden Schmidt (Ashton Kutcher), but their relationship is short-lived as Alan and Bridget, Walden's wife, successfully convince Walden that Courtney is simply a con artist.

=== Angie ===
Near the end of season 5, Charlie met an older woman (Susan Blakely) named Angie who was also the author of a relationship self-help book that he was interested in reading. Angie has been described as a mother figure to Charlie, more so than even his own mother, Evelyn. When Angie introduced him to her grown son Jeremy and his fiancée Tricia (Virginia Williams), Charlie realized that he had dated Tricia earlier in his life. After Tricia revealed that she still had feelings for Charlie, Tricia dumped Jeremy, and Angie became, as Alan describes, a "mean drunk" who verbally lashed out at Charlie and furiously broke up with him.

=== Melissa ===
In the season 6 episode "The Flavin' and the Mavin'", Charlie is annoyed that he must drive Alan to work, until he meets Alan's spunky young receptionist Melissa (Kelly Stables). Alan begs Charlie not to hit on her, as it will likely end badly and complicate their working relationship, but Charlie ignores him. Charlie sleeps with Melissa, then becomes annoyed when she constantly hangs around his house. Melissa becomes vindictive when she realizes that Charlie is not serious about their relationship. As Alan suspected, the failed relationship causes Melissa to demand a raise and health insurance. Melissa would later date Alan in several episodes of seasons 6, 7 and 8, becoming the third of Charlie's ex-girlfriends to go on to date Alan.

=== Chelsea ===
Chelsea Christine Melini (Jennifer Taylor) starts dating Charlie in season 6, and is the first woman to whom he confessed his love without prompting. He says this nearly by accident, but claims he meant it. At first, Chelsea was another one of Charlie's one-night stands, but it soon evolved into a relationship. The relationship comes to a rut with Chelsea wanting to break up, but after some couples counseling, the two remained together. Charlie proposed to her, ring and all, just to get her to say "I love you" back to him, and until the middle of season 7, they were engaged to be married. When Chelsea moved into the Harper beach house, Charlie rented out her vacant apartment to get alone time. Chelsea has a cat named "Sir Lancelot", who was almost never seen on-camera (two exceptions are in "Mmm, fish. Yum." and "Tinkle Like a Princess") and was constantly being stepped on, mostly by Charlie, but once by Alan. Chelsea got along well with Evelyn, much to Charlie's chagrin, and had a very rocky relationship with her nephew-to-be Jake, until Charlie forced them to work out their issues. Charlie had a telephone video of one of their lovemaking events, but when Chelsea found out, she erased the video herself. The two eventually broke up due to Charlie's jealousy towards her friendship with Alan's lawyer, Brad. Charlie then made matters worse by vomiting on a baby in public while apologizing to her, and subsequently slept with Chelsea's best friend, Gail (Tricia Helfer). Chelsea's last appearance was in the first episode of Season 9, when she announced at Charlie's funeral that he gave her chlamydia; Gail, who also attended, said Charlie gave her vaginal warts.

=== Betsy ===
Betsy (Katy Mixon) first met the Harper brothers the day Charlie and Chelsea set the date for their wedding. Panicked over the impending end of his bachelor lifestyle, Charlie finds himself blacked out drunk in bed with Betsy and Alan shortly after their meeting in Pavlov's Bar. With little memory of the night's events, Alan and Charlie left her home before dawn. Only remembering flashes of himself, his brother, and Betsy fooling around naked, shortly after Alan performed a striptease in drag, Charlie went to his mother for advice. To help wipe the disturbing memories from Charlie's mind, Evelyn told him of the time she cheated on her third husband with circus folk, including a clown, strongman, bearded lady, acrobats, and dwarfs, in one debased night. Traumatized by Evelyn's story, Charlie's few memories of the night were now replaced with images of his mother's circus orgy. When Charlie and Betsy encounter each other again, they immediately run off to Las Vegas and have a "quickie" wedding. But the marriage is soon rendered invalid when it is revealed that Betsy is already married.

=== Michelle ===
Michelle (Liz Vassey) is Charlie's dermatologist. In "Twanging Your Magic Clanger," they met when Charlie was getting a mole removed from his behind. They went to a movie and Charlie was surprised to learn that she is older than he is. After Alan telling him that he's probably gonna be dead for ten years by the time she turns 70 (which ironically came true, as he died not too long after), he went to Michelle and told her that he was interested in being in a relationship with her. He then met Michelle's 20-year-old daughter, which led him to briefly think about sex with the daughter. But after finding out that she thinks "older guys" (much younger than Charlie) are bad to have sex with, he returns to Michelle. In "The Crazy Bitch Gazette," Michelle and Charlie went on a date where they had lunch with Evelyn and Alan, causing a few embarrassing details about Charlie's past to slip out. When they got to Charlie's house, Charlie introduced Michelle to Berta and told Michelle about his past girlfriends and other sordid details of his life. To Charlie's surprise, Michelle still wanted to be with him. Later that night, Charlie's neighbor/stalker Rose appeared on his deck. Michelle was upset with Charlie, because he did not mention Rose in any of his confessions. Nor did he mention the fact that she constantly stalked him. The next week, Charlie went to Michelle's house with flowers and begged her to give him another chance. Michelle broke up with Charlie anyway, convinced that he still had feelings for Rose. At Charlie's funeral, Michelle builds on Lydia's remark about him by adding that he liked being spanked while wearing Michelle's panties.
