= Chuck Lorre =

American television writer and producer (born 1952)

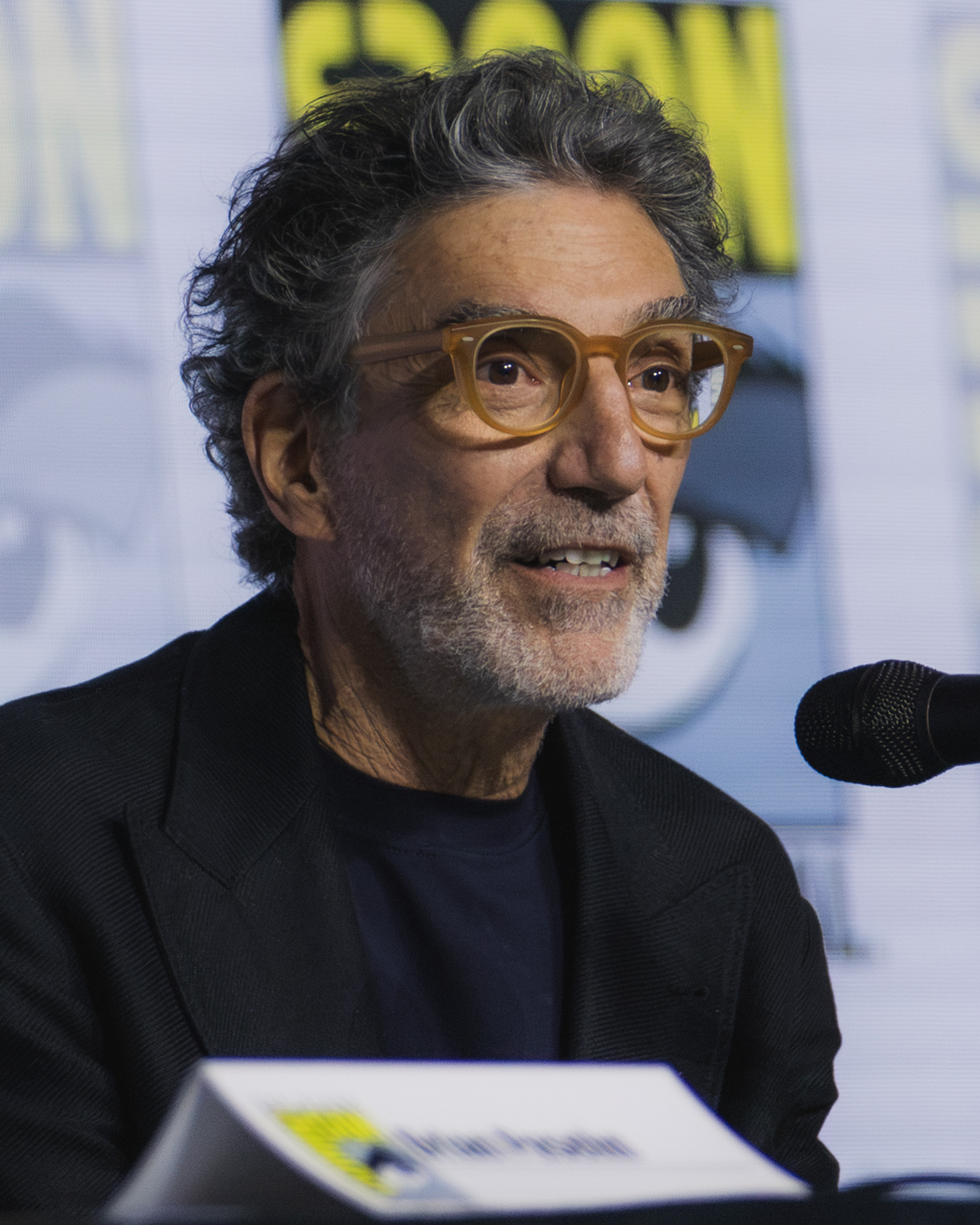
- Lorre in 2026
- Born: Charles Michael Levine; October 18, 1952 (age 74); Plainview, New York, U.S.
- Occupations: Writer; producer; director; composer
- Years active: 1978–present
- Spouses: Paula Smith (m. 1979; div. 1992) Karen Witter (m. 2001; div. 2010) Arielle Mandelson (m. 2018; div. 2024)
- Children: 2
- Website: chucklorre.com

Charles Michael Lorre (/ˈlɔːri/ LOR-ee; né Levine; born October 18, 1952) is an American television producer, writer, director, and composer. Nicknamed the "King of Sitcoms", Lorre has created/co-created and produced many sitcoms, including Cybill (1995–1998), Dharma & Greg (1997–2002), Two and a Half Men (2003–2015), The Big Bang Theory (2007–2019), and Mom (2013–2021). He also served as an executive producer of Roseanne. Lorre won two Golden Globe Awards for his work on Roseanne and Cybill.

== Early life and education ==
Lorre was born Charles Michael Levine in Plainview, New York, to a Jewish family and given the Hebrew name Chaim. His father, Robert, opened a luncheonette that did poorly, which caused financial problems. After graduating from high school in Plainview, Lorre attended the State University of New York at Potsdam, dropping out after two years to pursue a career as a songwriter. During his two years at college he "majored in rock 'n' roll and pot and minored in LSD". In 2011, he admitted to drinking heavily in his past, telling Entertainment Weekly (EW) that he "led a dissolute youth until 47" and also stating he was in addiction recovery at the time. He changed his surname from Levine to Lorre at age 26.

== Career ==
After leaving school, Lorre toured the United States as a guitarist and songwriter. He wrote the song "French Kissin", which Debbie Harry later recorded for her 1986 Rockbird album and which became a UK Top 10 hit. In the early 1980s, he turned to writing scripts for animated shows; his first project was the DIC version of Heathcliff. He co-wrote the soundtrack to the 1987 television series Teenage Mutant Ninja Turtles with Dennis Challen Brown.

Lorre rejected an invitation from DIC Animation City to be story editor for The New Adventures of Beany and Cecil, only to accept the offer as animation writers were not affected by the 1988 Writers Guild of America strike, which put him out of work, while also being contracted to compose stock music for the series. Despite gaining support from ABC, he was immediately shunned by developer John Kricfalusi and practically everyone else involved for the quality of his work and lack of passion. He was fired after an argument with original creator Bob Clampett's widow and son on this matter for this regard after complaints by other crew members.

In the late 1980s, he shifted into writing for sitcoms, and joined the writing staff of Roseanne. Though he was fired over "irreconcilable creative differences", Lorre's time on Roseanne impressed producers, and led to him creating his first show, Frannie's Turn. It was cancelled after 5 weeks.

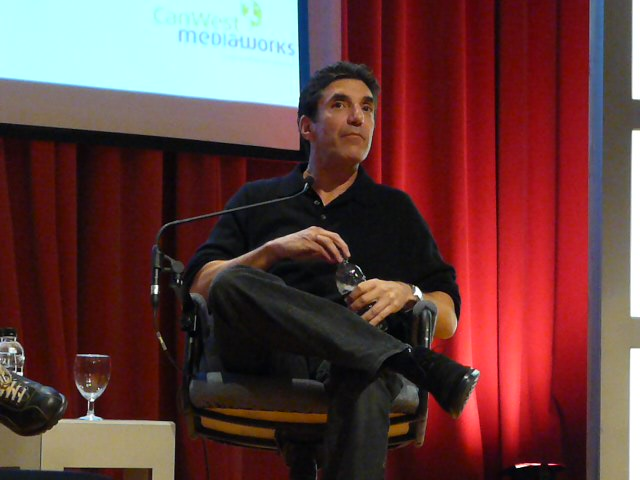
Lorre in 2007

Lorre's second show as creator, Grace Under Fire, starred comedian Brett Butler. It premiered on ABC in 1993, and was nominated at the 52nd Golden Globe Awards for Best Television Series – Musical or Comedy. His next show was Cybill, starring Cybill Shepherd. While Lorre left after two seasons, Cybill went on to air for four seasons on CBS, receiving critical acclaim and winning a Primetime Emmy Award in 1995 for Outstanding Supporting Actress in a Comedy Series for co-star Christine Baranski, and two Golden Globe Awards in 1996 for Best Television Series – Musical or Comedy and Best Actress in a Television Series – Musical or Comedy for Cybill Shepherd. Lorre signed a deal with Carsey-Werner Productions in 1994.

Lorre then moved to 20th Century Fox in 1995, creating Dharma & Greg in partnership with Dottie Zicklin (credited as Dottie Dartland), which premiered one year before the end of Cybill in 1997. It starred Jenna Elfman and Thomas Gibson as the title characters, whose personalities were complete opposites—Dharma's world view being more spiritual and 'free spirit'-style, instilled by "hippie" parents, contrasted with Greg's world view of structure, social status requirements, and "white collar duty" instilled by his generations of affluent parents/ancestors. The show received eight Golden Globe nominations, six Emmy Award nominations, and six Satellite Awards nominations, and Elfman won a Golden Globe for Best Actress in 1999.

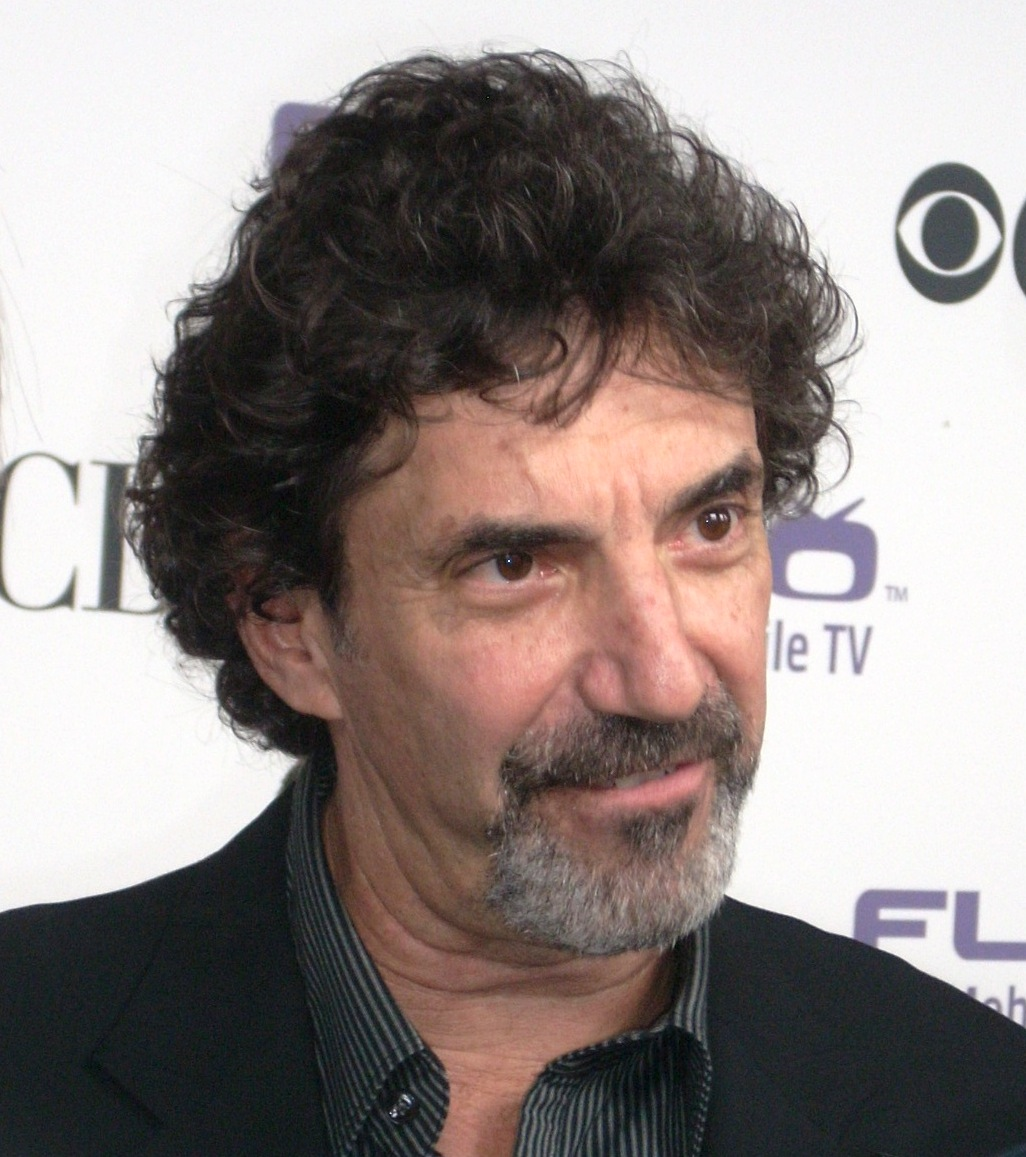
Lorre in 2008

To move on to his next project, Lorre signed a long-term deal with Warner Bros. Television in 2000, a relationship that continues to this day. Lorre created his fifth show, Two and a Half Men, with co-creator Lee Aronsohn. It focuses on the two Harper brothers, Charlie and Alan. Charlie is a hedonistic, successful commercial jingles composer and womanizer who owns a beach house in Malibu. Alan is a neurotic chiropractor, thrown out of his own house by his divorcing wife. The premise is that Alan worms himself into Charlie's house and clashes with his lifestyle. Alan also has a son, Jake, the "half", who comes to visit him and Charlie on weekends. Two and a Half Men premiered on CBS in 2003 and became the highest-rated sitcom in America. In 2011, CBS put the show on hiatus following a series of incidents of production shutdowns due to Charlie Sheen's personal and legal problems related to substance abuse and erratic behaviors, which culminated in the verbal attacks directed at Lorre during a radio interview. Sheen was fired from the show and later filed a $100 million wrongful termination lawsuit against Lorre and Warner Bros. Television. Lorre killed off Sheen's character and hired Ashton Kutcher as his replacement for the show's later four seasons.

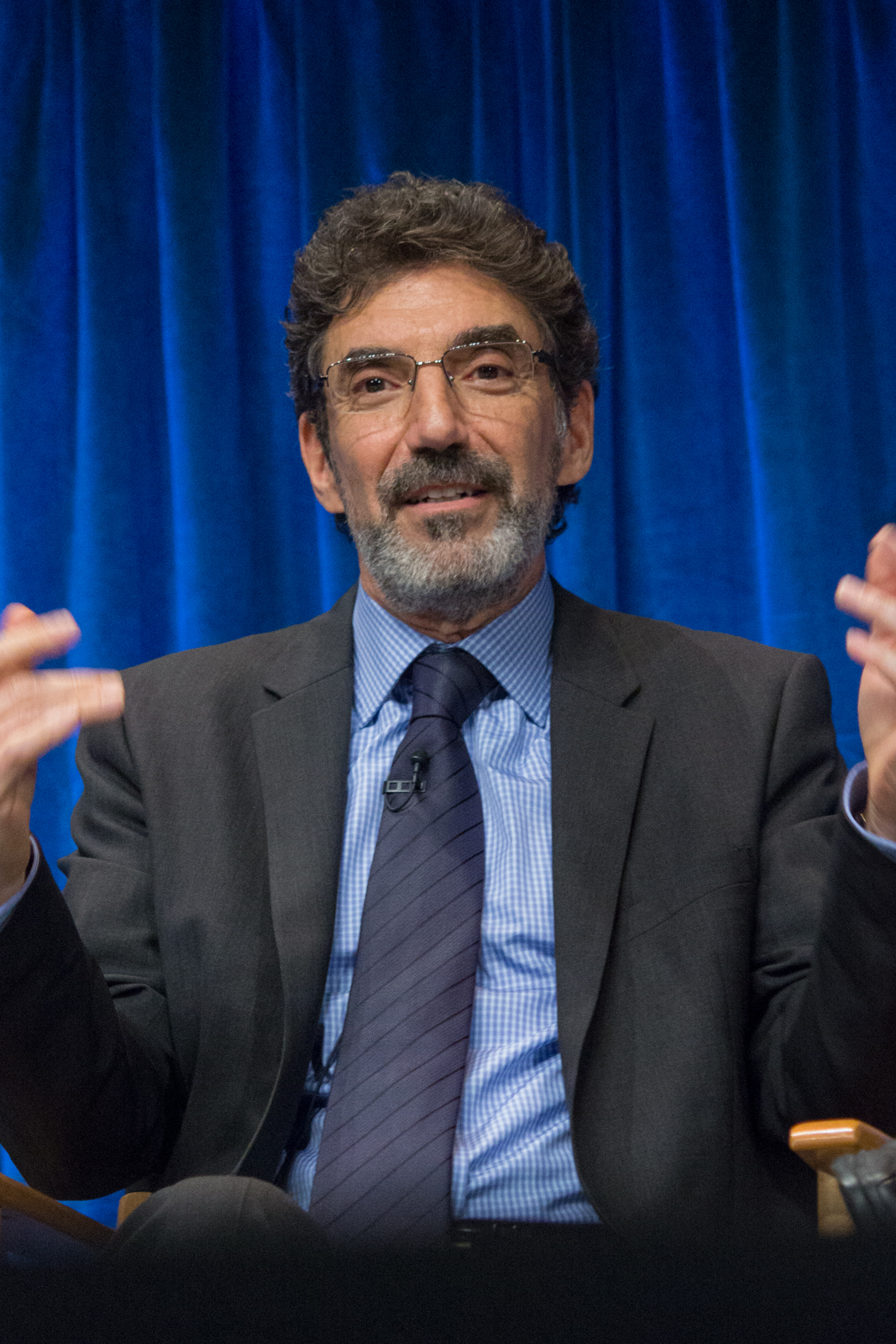
Lorre in 2013

Lorre's next show was The Big Bang Theory with co-creator Bill Prady. It follows two genius physicists, Sheldon Cooper and Leonard Hofstadter, with few social skills who befriend their neighbor, an attractive, outgoing young woman with average intelligence and no college education. The episodes usually focus primarily on the daily lives of the men and two of their brilliant but equally socially challenged friends, with a dose of absurdity from the relationship with their less educated but socially astute neighbor. The two main protagonists are named after actor and television producer Sheldon Leonard. The show was broadcast on CBS from 2007 to 2019 and was the highest rated comedy series in the United States. The show's popularity also launched three spin-offs: Young Sheldon, Georgie & Mandy's First Marriage, and Stuart Fails to Save the Universe.

In 2018, Lorre created The Kominsky Method, which follows a fictional aging acting coach used to success. It stars Michael Douglas and Alan Arkin and won Lorre a Golden Globe Award in 2019.

=== Other shows ===
Lorre was executive producer of Mike & Molly, created by Mark Roberts, which premiered on CBS in September 2010. His seventh show, created with Gemma Baker and Eddie Gorodetsky, Mom, premiered on CBS on September 23, 2013. On March 13, 2014, CBS announced the second season renewal of Mom. It ran for eight seasons.

Controversy surrounded United States of Al, a show produced by Lorre for CBS. Released to mostly negative reviews, United States of Al and its makers were criticized for the show's humor, use of antiquated tropes, and in particular, the casting of a South-African-born Indian actor to play an Afghan lead and his use of an inauthentic accent.

== Vanity cards ==
The unique vanity cards for Chuck Lorre Productions have become a "trademark" for Lorre, starting with Dharma & Greg and used for every one of his shows since. An Apple Macintosh computer was used for Lorre's production card on the earlier episodes of Cybill.

Typically, on the end of every episode of his productions, Lorre includes a different message that usually reads like an editorial, essay, or observation on life. A typical card might include a range of topics as diverse as what the Bee Gees never learned, the cancellation of Dharma & Greg, his support of Barack Obama, the competence of AOL Time Warner management, and the genesis of Two and a Half Men.

The card is shown for only a few seconds at most, so longer messages require the viewer to pause at the right spot or visit Lorre's website where he posts the cards. CBS has censored Lorre's vanity cards on several occasions; Lorre posts both the censored and uncensored versions of the cards.

During Charlie Sheen's controversial departure from Two and a Half Men in 2011, Lorre referenced Sheen in several cards. Lorre used the vanity card for the series finale, "Of Course He's Dead", to address the circumstances of Sheen's absence from the episode.

Lorre published a compilation of his vanity cards in a coffee table book titled What Doesn't Kill Us Makes Us Bitter, released on October 16, 2012. The book takes its title from Vanity Card #1, which first aired following the first episode of Dharma & Greg on September 24, 1997.

During The Big Bang Theory episode titled "The Hook-Up Reverberation", Vanity Card #463 was displayed. It discussed Lorre's lost or matured angst along with the news that he would stop writing the vanity cards. Vanity card #464 was shown after the next episode, stating it was his last and that he felt like they would not be missed. However, he resumed the cards. Card #493 on March 5, 2015, was a tribute to the late Leonard Nimoy, who had guest-starred on the show as the voice of Sheldon's conscience three years earlier.

When Channing Dungey, chairwoman and CEO of Warner Bros. Television Studios discussed the reemergence of the sitcom in a February 2023 Deadline article, Deadline opined: "There are fewer and fewer younger writers that are attracted to the form, however, making finding the next Chuck Lorre trickier," with Dungey commenting "I worry that it's becoming a bit of a lost art". When Lorre read this, he used Vanity Card #723 to ask "The next Chuck Lorre?! What the &$@? is wrong with the one you have now?!".

Lorre created a special, unnumbered vanity card for Bookie, his first show released exclusively to streaming television. In the vanity card, Lorre remarked on the irrelevancy of writing vanity cards in an age where most streaming platforms encourage credits-skipping, remarking "Why on earth am I writing vanity cards for BOOKIE?" and "If a vanity card is written on MAX, and no one reads it, was it amusing?". This vanity card on the 7th episode of Bookie, titled "The Super Bowl: God's Gift to Bookies", which aired on December 21, 2023, on MAX, was dedicated to Marvin Miles, who died on August 3, 2023, at the age of 72. The tombstone reads: "R.I.P. Marvin Miles (October 6, 1950–August 3, 2023)". The vanity card reads: "In Memory of "Marvelous" Marvin Miles". Lorre discusses about algorithm, or bot, or some sort of silicon-based magical genie to secure the future of Georgie & Mandy's First Marriage, because Georgie & Mandy's First Marriage premiered on October 17, 2024 on CBS. Later in the season, he used the vanity card to express his gratitude to the Los Angeles Fire Department for saving his home during the 2025 California wildfires.

== Selected credits ==
Title	Year	Creator / Showrunner	Director	Writer	Executive Producer	Network
Heathcliff	1984–1985	No	No	Yes	No	Syndicated
Pole Position	1984	No	No	Yes	No	CBS
Wolf Rock TV	1984	No	No	Yes	No	ABC
M.A.S.K.	1985	No	No	Yes	No	Syndicated
Muppets, Babies and Monsters	1985	No	No	Yes	No	CBS
My Little Pony 'n Friends	1986	No	No	Yes	No	Syndicated
Defenders of the Earth	1986–1987	No	No	Yes	No	Syndicated
Charles in Charge	1987	No	No	Yes	No	CBS
My Two Dads	1987–1990	No	No	Yes	No	NBC
The New Adventures of Beany and Cecil	1988	No	No	Yes	No	ABC
Roseanne	1990–1992	No	No	Yes	Yes	ABC
Toxic Crusaders	1991	No	No	Yes	No	Syndicated
Frannie's Turn	1992	Yes	No	Yes	Yes	CBS
Grace Under Fire	1993–1998	Yes	No	Yes	Yes	ABC
Cybill	1995–1998	Yes	No	Yes	Yes	CBS
Dharma & Greg	1997–2002	Yes	Yes	Yes	Yes	ABC
Two and a Half Men	2003–2015	Yes	Yes	Yes	Yes	CBS
The Big Bang Theory	2007–2019	Yes	No	Yes	Yes	CBS
CSI: Crime Scene Investigation	2008	No	No	Yes	No	CBS
Mike & Molly	2010–2016	No	No	Yes	Yes	CBS
Mom	2013–2021	Yes	No	Yes	Yes	CBS
Disjointed	2017–2018	Yes	No	Yes	Yes	Netflix
Young Sheldon	2017–2024	Yes	No	Yes	Yes	CBS
The Kominsky Method	2018–2021	Yes	Yes	Yes	Yes	Netflix
Bob Hearts Abishola	2019–2024	Yes	No	Yes	Yes	CBS
B Positive	2020–2022	No	No	Yes	Yes	CBS
United States of Al	2021–2022	No	No	Yes	Yes	CBS
Bookie	2023–2025	Yes	Yes	Yes	Yes	Max
Georgie & Mandy's First Marriage	2024–present	Yes	No	Yes	Yes	CBS
Leanne	2025–present	Yes	No	Yes	Yes	Netflix
Stuart Fails to Save the Universe	2026–present	Yes	No	Yes	Yes	HBO Max

== Awards and recognition ==
Lorre won BMI Television Music Awards in 2004, 2005, 2008 and 2009 for Two and a Half Men. On March 12, 2009, Lorre received a star on the Hollywood Walk of Fame, located at 7021 Hollywood Boulevard. Three months later, Lorre received an honorary degree from the State University of New York at Potsdam and gave a keynote address at the graduation.

In March 2012, Lorre was inducted into the Television Academy Hall of Fame. Lorre has won Golden Globe Awards for Roseanne (1993) and Cybill (1996). Lorre was awarded the Critics' Choice Award for Creative Achievement in 2019.

== Personal life ==
Lorre was first married to his business partner Paula Smith in 1979. They ended both partnerships after 13 years and the births of their two children.

He was married to Karen Witter, an actress, model and author. They divorced in July 2010 after a decade's marriage.

From 2010 to 2011, he was in a relationship with Emmanuelle Vaugier, a Canadian actress and model, who appeared in 12 episodes of Two and a Half Men.

In September 2018, Lorre married Arielle Mandelson, a wellness influencer. Lorre filed for divorce in 2022. The divorce was finalized in February 2024.

Lorre primarily lives in Bel Air, Los Angeles. He has a couple properties in Pacific Palisades, California.

He has publicly discussed his decades of struggle with the autoimmune disease ulcerative colitis, along with depression, anxiety, and bouts of anger or rage, saying, "Put me in paradise and I will focus on the one thing that will make me angry." In an interview with Entertainment Weekly, he said, "I am wired on some deep level to seek out something to be worried and obsess about."

He lost his sense of smell due to a broken septum as a result of a drunken fight, which was finally repaired several years later.

He revealed in his memoir "Sitcom", that he previously spent 10 years as a Scientologist, calling it "one of my darker secrets". When he approached Dharma and Greg star and current Scientologist Jenna Elfman regarding another project, she told him that as he was a suppressive person, she could no longer work with him.
