= Nice to Meet You, Walden Schmidt =

- Two and a Half Men episode
- Episode no.: Season 9 Episode 1
- Directed by: James Widdoes
- Written by: Chuck Lorre; Lee Aronsohn; Eddie Gorodetsky; Jim Patterson
- Production code: 3X6951
- Original air date: September 19, 2011

Guest appearances
- Jenna Elfman as Dharma Montgomery; Thomas Gibson as Greg Montgomery; John Stamos as himself; Tricia Helfer as Gail; Katherine LaNasa as Lydia; Jenny McCarthy as Courtney; Jodi Lyn O'Keefe as Isabella; Missi Pyle as Miss Pasternak; Jeri Ryan as Sherri; Jennifer Taylor as Chelsea; Liz Vassey as Michelle; Emmanuelle Vaugier as Mia; Martin Mull as Russell; Joel Murray as Delivery Man

Episode chronology
← Previous "That Darn Priest"	Next → "People Who Love Peepholes"
- Two and a Half Men season 9

"Nice to Meet You, Walden Schmidt" is the ninth season premiere of the American sitcom Two and a Half Men and the 178th episode overall. The first appearance of Ashton Kutcher as Walden Schmidt, "an internet billionaire with a broken heart", it was written by series creators Chuck Lorre and Lee Aronsohn, along with Eddie Gorodetsky and Jim Patterson, and directed by James Widdoes. It is the first episode without former lead Charlie Sheen as Charlie Harper and aired on September 19, 2011, on CBS.

The episode was watched by 28.74 million viewers on its original American broadcast, making it the most watched episode of Two and a Half Men. Despite this, the episode received mixed reviews from critics, mostly for its cast replacement and poor improv, though Sheen was reported to have enjoyed the episode and praised Kutcher's performance.

== Plot ==
Picking up where "That Darn Priest" left off, it is revealed that Charlie Harper is dead, having been killed in an accident, offscreen, while on his weekend getaway to Paris with Rose.

The episode opens with Alan delivering the eulogy at Charlie's funeral. Several of Charlie's ex-girlfriends are in attendance, such as Mia, Courtney, Isabella, Chelsea and even Miss Pasternak. They heckle Alan while he attempts to speak and Courtney expresses dismay about it not being an open-casket ceremony. Alan yields the pulpit to Rose, who reveals that Charlie proposed to her in Paris. A few days later, however, Rose caught him in the shower with another woman, something everyone murmurs Charlie would do while Berta announces the thought with a laugh. Rose then goes on to explain she forgave him and was greatly saddened when Charlie "accidentally" fell in front of a moving train the following day. Alan suspects that Rose might have had something to do with Charlie's death, but keeps silent while Berta quietly states "Never cross a crazy woman" and Jake claiming he is hungry after hearing Rose's gruesome yet oddly appetizing description of how Charlie's body was demolished (describing it as a "balloon full of meat").

Discovering that Charlie's house has three mortgages and that Alan is unable to afford the payments, Evelyn puts the house up for sale. Several people consider buying the house, but eventually decide against it for one reason or another. First, John Stamos decides against it because he said that the place has bad memories. One bad memory includes John and Charlie having sex with a woman in the house one night; when she passed out, they kept going without her. Second, the house is not purchased by Dharma & Greg, who decide against it because Greg said it was not "practical" and that the commute downtown would "kill" him. Some time later, Alan receives Charlie's cremated remains, and shares a heartfelt goodbye with his late brother, telling him how much he loves him and will truly miss him. Given the impossibility of fulfilling Charlie's wish to have his ashes be swallowed by Pamela Anderson (he also turns down taking him to live at Evelyn's, claiming "That's how horror movies start"), Alan decides to sprinkle the remains on the beach. As he goes to do so, he is startled by a young man standing on the deck, causing him to spill Charlie's ashes all over the living room. Berta quips her classic line, "I ain't cleaning him up."

The stranger asks to use the phone, and reveals that he was attempting suicide because his wife had left him. After phoning his wife and being rejected again, the stranger introduces himself to Alan as Walden Schmidt, a billionaire who made his money by selling out to Microsoft. After Walden asks for a wetsuit so that he can try to drown himself again, Alan offers to take him to Pavlov's bar. The two pick up a pair of women who are sympathetic towards Walden. The four return to Charlie's house, which is now Alan's, where Alan offers to make drinks. While he is away, the two women lead Walden upstairs where they have sex with him in Charlie's room, leaving Alan downstairs and alone. Annoyed, Alan tells Charlie's ashes (which are in a Black & Decker DustBuster) to shut up because of the irony and puts them in the garbage. The next morning, a naked Walden goes into the kitchen, meets Berta, who is impressed by his endowment and tells Alan about what happened the night before. Walden also announces his intent to buy the house. As Judith comes by to drop Jake off for the weekend, they walk in on Walden hugging Alan out of gratitude for his friendship. Judith says "I like him." and then the episode ends with a "To be continued" message.

== Production ==
This episode was written by series regulars Chuck Lorre, Lee Aronsohn, Eddie Gorodetsky, and Jim Patterson, directed by series regular James Widdoes, and was taped on August 5, 2011 to a full and enthusiastic audience, long after the conclusion of the eighth production season, which was put to an end in February because of Sheen's threats towards Lorre.

Kutcher was announced as Sheen's replacement for the series on May 13, 2011, after Sheen was fired on March 7, 2011. This is the second sitcom Kutcher has starred in, after his career-debut role in That '70s Show, which was beginning its sixth season when Two and a Half Men premiered in 2003.

Jenna Elfman and Thomas Gibson reprised their roles as Dharma and Greg Montgomery for the first time in nearly a decade. Elfman previously played a different character on Two and a Half Men. However, Elfman and Gibson were only credited as an unnamed couple. The couple's chemistry is noticeably darker than in Dharma & Greg, with Gibson's character making sarcastic mentions of divorce and suicide. Elfman and Gibson's co-star, Joel Murray, guest starred as a mail delivery guy in the episode.

This is the first episode on the show to feature full nudity (albeit censored by pixelation). The Chuck Lorre Productions vanity card is just a picture of three tin cans, but one of them is placed sideways.

Denise Richards reportedly turned down the chance to appear in the episode out of respect for Sheen.

== Reception ==
=== Ratings ===
With 28.74 million viewers in its original airing, the episode was the most watched in the history of the show. It scored a 10.7/25 rating/share in the 18-49 age group. At one point, the audience peaked at 31 million viewers with an 11.4/26 rating/share. Including DVR ratings, which added 4.09 million viewers, the episode was watched by a total of 32.83 million viewers with a 12.5 18-49 rating. In Canada, the show was watched by approximately 5 million viewers, with 6.7 million watching some of it. In Australia, the show was watched by an average of 2.3 million viewers in the five major capital cities, peaking at 2.6 million, which gave the show its highest ever ratings figure for an episode broadcast in Australia. It was also the most watched show on Australian television that night, beating third placed drama hit Packed to the Rafters by 655,000 viewers. In the United Kingdom, the episode aired on September 20 on the pay television channel Comedy Central and brought in a total of 803,000 viewers, making it the most watched programme in the channel's history.

=== Critical reception ===
The episode received mixed reviews from numerous critics. Tim Goodman of The Hollywood Reporter noted; "I couldn't quite figure out if Kutcher was going for vacant, naïve, nerdy or astonishingly dumb (for a character who is a billionaire), because I'll never watch this show by choice again." However, he believes Sheen would have the last laugh given "his new show – if it ever happens – will be exponentially funnier than the laugh-free 22 minutes from last night." Richard Lawson of Gawker Media was displeased with how the show dealt with both Charlie Harper's death/funeral and the introduction of Walden Schmidt in one episode. Lawson noted that Kutcher "ought to fit in just fine", but that viewers would still miss Sheen's "teetering-on-the-brink-of-oblivion verve" complementing the show's "tit jokes and dick jokes and fart jokes occasionally peppered by quips delivered by determinedly non-sexual women characters". Lori Rackl of Chicago Sun-Times gave the episode a positive review, stating, "Filling the void left by a well established character isn’t easy, but Kutcher mostly succeeded".

=== Charlie Sheen's reaction ===
Sheen watched the episode and was extremely pleased. He reportedly felt Charlie Harper's funeral was "eerie but fun". Sheen also felt that the reveal of Kutcher's character in a cloud of his own character's ashes was particularly enjoyable.
