= Two and a Half Men season 9 =

Two and a Half Men
- Season 9
- DVD cover art
- Showrunner: Lee Aronsohn
- Starring: Ashton Kutcher; Jon Cryer; Angus T. Jones; Marin Hinkle; Conchata Ferrell; Holland Taylor
- No. of episodes: 24

Release
- Original network: CBS
- Original release: September 19, 2011 – May 14, 2012

Season chronology
- ← Previous; Season 8 Next → Season 10

The ninth season of the American television sitcom Two and a Half Men aired on CBS from September 19, 2011 to May 14, 2012.

The season saw Ashton Kutcher joining the cast as Walden Schmidt. This season is the first without the show's previous star Charlie Sheen, and features a rebooted plot, marking a major change in the series by focusing on Alan and Jake coping with life after the death of Charlie, with help from their new best friend and housemate, Walden, a dot-com billionaire who is in the process of being divorced by his wife. The trio bond and form a surrogate family unit. This was the last season to air on Mondays.

== Cast ==
=== Main ===
Note: The billing for the regular characters changed in the opening credits this season in that Jon Cryer and Ashton Kutcher with Angus T. Jones, guest star Amber Tamblyn, also featuring Jennifer Bini Taylor, and Hilary Duff are listed at the same time and Conchata Ferrell is listed before Marin Hinkle. The Complete Ninth Season DVD cover dropped Marin Hinkle's name and character from the cast list altogether, and CBS press releases for season 9 billed Hinkle as a recurring cast member.

- Ashton Kutcher as Walden Schmidt
- Jon Cryer as Alan Harper
- Angus T. Jones as Jake Harper
- Amber Tamblyn as Jenny
- Conchata Ferrell as Berta
- Marin Hinkle as Judith Harper-Melnick
- Holland Taylor as Evelyn Harper
- Hilary Duff as Stacey
- Miley Cyrus as Missi

=== Recurring ===
- Sophie Winkleman as Zoey Hyde-Tottingham-Pierce
- Courtney Thorne-Smith as Lyndsey McElroy
- Graham Patrick Martin as Eldridge McElroy
- Judy Greer as Bridget Schmidt
- Melanie Lynskey as Rose
- Ryan Stiles as Herb Melnick
- Talyan Wright as Ava Pierce
- Jenny McCarthy as Courtney
- Mimi Rogers as Robin Schmidt
- Patton Oswalt as Billy Stanhope

=== Guest ===
- Jenna Elfman as Dharma Finkelstein Montgomery
- Thomas Gibson as Greg Montgomery
- John Stamos as Prospective House Buyer
- Jennifer Taylor as Chelsea
- Emmanuelle Vaugier as Mia
- Tricia Helfer as Gail
- Katherine LaNasa as Lydia
- Jodi Lyn O'Keefe as Isabella
- Missi Pyle as Mrs. Pasternak
- Jeri Ryan as Sherri
- Liz Vassey as Michelle
- Joel Murray as Doug
- Martin Mull as Russell
- Jane Lynch as Dr. Linda Freeman
- Joe Manganiello as Alex
- Taylor Cole as Melanie Laughlin
- Macey Cruthird as Megan
- Vernee Watson as Nurse
- Jonathan Banks as Pawn Broker
- Matthew Marsden as Nigel
- Gary Busey as Alan's hospital roommate
- Georgia Engel as Jean McElroy
- Brian Stepanek as Arthur
- Kathy Bates as Ghost of Charlie Harper
- Jason Alexander as Dr. Goodman

== Production ==
Following Charlie Sheen's firing on March 7, 2011, there was much speculation as to whether the show would be canceled for good, following the cancelation of the previous season. Chuck Lorre revealed that he'd considered ending the show, but thought that it would've been "such a heartbreaking way to end". On May 13, 2011, it was announced that Ashton Kutcher would be taking over from Sheen, playing new character Walden Schmidt. It was also announced that the writers would kill off Charlie Harper. For a revamped show, the producers re-decorated the main set of the beach house, which was used up until the final season. The theme tune was also redone, with two new singers used in the opening sequence. The new variation of the theme was used only until the end of this season, before another variation was used for seasons 10 and 11, except for a production error in the third episode of season 10 in which season 9's variation of the theme is heard. Ashton Kutcher assisted Chuck Lorre with the creation of Walden Schmidt and co-wrote the story of "Slowly and in a Circular Fashion", which develops his character. The character of Charlie Harper, despite being killed off, was re-introduced late in the season as a ghost in a woman's body for a guest reprisal, played by Kathy Bates. Chuck Lorre described the casting as a "gender bending role".

CBS president Les Moonves was extremely pleased with the season, saying "This show could last with the current numbers it has for many, many years." Jon Cryer believed that Kutcher had added a new energy to the show and revitalized it.

== Episodes ==
No. overall	No. in season	Title	Directed by	Written by	Original release date	Prod. code	U.S. viewers (millions)
178	1	"Nice to Meet You, Walden Schmidt"	James Widdoes	Chuck Lorre & Lee Aronsohn & Eddie Gorodetsky & Jim Patterson	September 19, 2011	3X6951	28.74
After Charlie is killed in a subway accident in Paris, Alan is forced to face the harsh reality of losing his only brother. Although he did inherit the residence, Alan finds out that the house has multiple mortgages on it, and since he is unable to pay it, he and Jake have to move out and move in with Evelyn. Soon after, however, a young man named Walden Schmidt (Ashton Kutcher), who turns out to be a billionaire, shows up on the deck after a suicide attempt. The two broken-hearted men form a friendship, leading to Schmidt offering to buy the house. First appearance of: Walden Schmidt Title quotation from: Alan, after Walden fully introduces himself right before getting in the shower.
179	2	"People Who Love Peepholes"	James Widdoes	Chuck Lorre & Lee Aronsohn & Eddie Gorodetsky & Jim Patterson	September 26, 2011	3X6952	20.52
Walden moves into the beach house, leaving all of Charlie's belongings intact, and Alan leaves to move in with his mother. Not long after, however, Walden asks Alan to go with him as backup when he tries to get his wife, Bridget (Judy Greer), to take him back. Eventually, Bridget agrees to give Walden a chance to prove himself, and Walden agrees to let Alan stay with him temporarily in Malibu, as a 'Thank you' for all the help Alan has given him. First appearance of: Bridget Schmidt Title quotation from: Alan, after Walden excitedly discovers the front door has a peephole, calling such people "the luckiest people in the world".
180	3	"Big Girls Don't Throw Food"	James Widdoes	Story by : Chuck Lorre & Andrew J. B. Aronsohn; Teleplay by : Eddie Gorodetsky & Jim Patterson	October 3, 2011	3X6953	17.71
When Berta becomes Walden's live-in housekeeper and takes what was Alan's room, Alan and Jake have to share Jake's room. Walden and Jake get to know each other, and Jake decides to quit education like Walden. Walden's date with Bridget does not go as he had planned. Saddened by still being separated from Bridget, Walden shares his feeling with Judith, who has visited to remonstrate with him for influencing Jake to quit education but ends up making out with him. Jake takes a video of Judith kissing Walden, intending to blackmail her into letting him quit high school. Title quotation from: Walden, having a dinner date with Bridget, while a nearby child is throwing food at him.
181	4	"Nine Magic Fingers"	James Widdoes	Story by : Eddie Gorodetsky & Jim Patterson; Teleplay by : Chuck Lorre & Lee Aronsohn	October 10, 2011	3X6954	16.20
Still depressed by his recent separation from Bridget, Walden decides it is time to start searching for the new Mrs. Right. He meets Courtney (Jenny McCarthy) at a bar, and the two hit it off. The two carry on a brief, shallow relationship, much like the relationships Charlie had with her. Alan, knowing that Courtney is a con artist (see "Fish in a Drawer"), confronts her about taking advantage of Walden while he is still heartbroken over Bridget. When Courtney ignores him, Alan calls Bridget and explains the situation to her. Bridget arrives, and Walden is forced to make a choice between Courtney, with whom he enjoys having sex, and Bridget, whom he truly loves. Walden almost chooses Courtney, until she accepts Bridget's offer to give her $50,000 to leave Walden alone. Grateful for all the help Alan has given him, Walden invites Alan to move back in permanently, and Berta resumes her job as a part-time maid, rather than a live-in. Meanwhile, Alan tries to rekindle his relationship with his ex-girlfriend, Lyndsey. Title quotation from: Berta's boyfriend, who is missing the middle finger on his right hand.
182	5	"A Giant Cat Holding a Churro"	James Widdoes	Story by : Chuck Lorre & Lee Aronsohn & Eddie Gorodetsky & Jim Patterson; Teleplay by : Susan Beavers & Don Reo & David Richardson	October 17, 2011	3X6955	15.14
Alan discovers that Lyndsey once starred in a soft-core porn film called "Cinnamon's Buns" and confronts her about it. After having a discussion with her about honesty, he decides to reveal all of his life's secrets to her (including the fact that he gave her earrings stolen from Judith, may be the father of Judith and Herb's baby, got his family involved in a Ponzi scheme, found out Rose's "husband" was a mannequin and took $50,000 to keep it secret, and was tricked by Charlie into letting the family dog lick peanut butter off his genitals as a child). Disgusted, Lyndsey throws him out and the two split up. Walden, having been inspired by Lyndsey's role in the porn film, learns to bake and makes a batch of cannabis brownies with Berta, and then proceeds to hold a party to cheer up Alan. Lyndsey shows up to apologize just as a stoned Alan is surrounded by bikini-clad girls ready to eat whipped cream and cherries off of his body. Walden throws Alan off the deck so he can truthfully tell Lyndsey that Alan is not home. The next day, Lyndsey apologizes for acting so rashly, but Alan reveals what he was really doing when she showed up at the party the previous night, causing Lyndsey to throw him out once again. Title quotation from: Walden, high on cannabis brownies, after seeing Berta walk by wearing face paint with a churro in her hand.
183	6	"The Squat and the Hover"	James Widdoes	Story by : Chuck Lorre & Lee Aronsohn & Eddie Gorodetsky & Jim Patterson; Teleplay by : Susan Beavers & Don Reo & David Richardson	October 24, 2011	3X6956	15.29
Walden receives his divorce papers, and decides to burn all of his mementos of Bridget so he can move on with his new life. He is also planning to sell the house and move to New York. When Alan hears this, he becomes worried about losing his home and convinces Walden that this may be a sign of depression. He refers him to Charlie's old psychiatrist, Dr. Freeman (Jane Lynch). She convinces him that it is better to stay and solve his problems rather than going away with them. After running into Bridget with a date (Joe Manganiello) at the movies, Walden heads to a local bar with Alan to drown his sorrows. There, they meet a woman named Danny who looks strikingly like Bridget, although she is a lesbian and accompanied by her partner, Kiki (Monika Smith). Walden kisses Alan, trying to win Danny and Kiki's favor by convincing them he and Alan are also gay. The four head back to the house where he eventually confesses to Danny that he is not really gay and only wanted to spend time with her because she reminds him of his soon-to-be ex-wife. Danny forgives him but she walks in on Alan and Kiki kissing, and Danny punches Alan in the face three times before storming out with Kiki. In the end, Alan confesses to Walden that he only sent him to Dr. Freeman because he did not want to move out again and that he understands if he has to go. Walden then tells him that he is going to stay, as he took the doctor's advice to sort out his problems instead and states "How could I leave behind my best friend?". Title quotation from: Kiki, describing the way she had to use the bar's bathroom.
184	7	"Those Fancy Japanese Toilets"	James Widdoes	Story by : Chuck Lorre & Lee Aronsohn; Teleplay by : Eddie Gorodetsky & Jim Patterson	October 31, 2011	3X6957	13.90
Evelyn tells Alan that Charlie had a safe deposit box containing only a journal, which she gives to Alan. He becomes fascinated with reading it, as the entries suggest a reflective and questioning attitude that he had never seen in Charlie before. It is also hinted that, despite all the mocking and disrespect, Charlie felt affection for his brother and missed him when he moved in with Lyndsey. Jake has a tutor, fellow student Megan (Macey Cruthird). Jake has a crush on her, but she is not interested, and she comes on to Walden. When he does not respond, Megan throws herself at Jake, who later tells Walden he loves him. Walden tells Evelyn he wants to redecorate the house and hires her as his interior designer. Alan warns him that Evelyn is a "super-duper-über-cougar", but Walden tells him not to worry; they end up having sex. Title quotation from: Walden, telling Evelyn he wants a bidet in his bathroom.
185	8	"Thank You for the Intercourse"	James Widdoes	Story by : Chuck Lorre & Susan McMartin; Teleplay by : Lee Aronsohn & Eddie Gorodetsky & Jim Patterson	November 7, 2011	3X6958	14.71
Walden finds out about all the jingles that Charlie wrote and sings them out loud, causing Alan's grief to get the better of him. When he finds out that Walden donated his brother's piano, an object that has many memories of the latter tied to it, Alan drowns his sorrows with alcohol at a local bar. After watching Walden picking up another woman named Alicia (Amanda Schull), he returns home with them and steps out on the deck, looking up into the night sky as he talks to Charlie through the Heavens. When a labrador runs up to him, followed by its owner, a beautiful woman named Melanie (Taylor Cole), he suddenly starts to behave and talk like Charlie and even manages to seduce her. Berta remarks that "it's walking like Zippy, but it sure ain't talking like Zippy". Walden and Jake become worried about him after he starts to wear bowling shirts and calls himself Charlie Harper. He even walks in on Jake and Megan (Macey Cruthird) making out and ends up telling them to use protection. Walden then takes him to a mental hospital by pretending that they are going to Vegas. While lying in bed in the hospital, Alan, believing he is in the presidential suite of the Bellagio, orders two Asian prostitutes from room service, sits back with his cigar and declares that he is "winning", thus referencing Charlie Sheen's public statements after he was fired. Title quotation from: Walden, to his one-night stand, after revealing he does not have any intentions of beginning a relationship with her.
186	9	"Frodo's Headshots"	James Widdoes	Story by : Chuck Lorre & Lee Aronsohn; Teleplay by : Susan Beavers & Don Reo & David Richardson	November 14, 2011	3X6959	14.77
Alan is released from the mental hospital and gets picked up by Jake. On the way back home, his newly acquired confidence faces a setback when Jake tells him that he is about to father a child with his girlfriend Megan. Although he is very upset, he calms himself down and arranges a meeting with Judith and Herb to tell them and face it as a family. During the meeting, Walden, who looks after a grown Milly, remarks that she looks a lot like Alan, deeply upsetting Herb. Soon after, Alan also receives a letter from the IRS, informing him that he is being audited. The agency is claiming he owes them $80,000 (for reasons unknown). When Alan finds out that Lyndsey has left him for Walden, he completely loses his temper. Walden also asks him to move out, as it would be creepy if he stayed with them. They tell him that they put his stuff in a storage bin at the airport. Alan then tries to commit suicide through an overdose of CO, but fails miserably, as the engine of his car breaks down. After being rejected by his mother, he seeks shelter in his storage bin. Just as he loses his last bit of hope, a beautiful woman named Veronica Hastings (Nicole Steinwedell) invites him to a glass of wine, immediately cheering him up. As the woman walks away to get the wine from her storage bin, Herb steps out of the dark in a trenchcoat. He informs Alan that he performed a DNA test and found out that Milly is Alan's daughter, not his. He then takes out a pistol and shoots Alan repeatedly. It is then revealed that Alan is still in the hospital and everything that happened was just a dream. When he actually returns home, he is confronted with Walden's new and modernized house decor. Much to his sadness, it no longer reflects Charlie's home, prompting him to admit that he no longer belongs here. But when Walden asks him if this means he is going to move out, Alan declines immediately. Gary Busey guest stars as Alan's clinic roommate. Title quotation from: Jake, in Alan's dream, discussing the plans of having his future son in a TV commercial.
187	10	"A Fishbowl Full of Glass Eyes"	James Widdoes	Story by : Chuck Lorre & Gemma Baker; Teleplay by : Lee Aronsohn & Eddie Gorodetsky & Jim Patterson	November 21, 2011	3X6960	15.82
While grocery shopping, Walden and Jake meet a British woman named Zoey (Sophie Winkleman). Jake, who heard his father talk about how rich Walden is, helps the latter where he can, fully intending to get paid for it. He even advises Walden to ask her out, an offer that Zoey gladly accepts. When Jake asks his new "boss" if he owns a yacht, he tells him that he does not like displays of extreme wealth and, at the same time, reveals that he already got a private jet. He then proceeds to give Jake 250,000 frequent-flyer miles, having no use for them. On the night of the date, Alan recommends that Walden take off his wedding ring, as it indicates that he still has feelings for Bridget. Walden gives the ring to Alan and decides to move on. During the date, he behaves oddly, mentioning his suicide attempt and the exact time that has passed since he and Bridget broke up, prompting Zoey to tell him that he is still in love with his ex-wife and isn't ready for dating yet. Proving this point, Walden calls Bridget after the date to tell her about it, only to hear her agree with Zoey. Meanwhile, Alan is desperate to earn some money and tries to set up a Ponzi scheme with different credit cards. Just as he is about to ask Walden to loan him some money, Berta tells him that Walden likes him because he is the only one who does not want anything from him. Alan agrees with Berta and visits a pawn shop to make some money off of his old Gateway computer and the diamond cufflinks Evelyn gave him (which turn out to be fake). As Sid (Jonathan Banks), the pawn shop owner, rejects the items, Alan presents him a vase which he hopes is worth a few bucks. When Sid proclaims the vase is Steuben crystal and offers Alan $1,200 for it, Alan shrieks and drops the vase to the floor, where it shatters. After later receiving Walden's wedding ring (calling it "My precious") that is made out of rhodium and platinum, he returns to the pawn shop and freaks out over its value. When he comes back to the house, he joins a sad Walden at the beach, who asks him for his ring. It is revealed that Alan did not pawn the ring, fully knowing that Walden would want it back in the end. To Alan's shock, Walden decides to separate himself from the ring permanently by throwing it in the ocean. Alan storms into the water to search for it after Walden leaves. Upon returning to the house, he confesses his intentions to Walden, who then tells him that he could have asked him for money, which he just gives away, as he does not believe in loaning it. Alan declines the offer for the sake of their friendship and even agrees to pay rent. He then asks Walden if he would have agreed to give him $100,000. When Walden says he would have, Alan goes back into the ocean, being furious at himself. Just at that moment, Jake, who used Walden's frequent-flyer miles, calls from Paris, not knowing where he is. First appearance of: Zoey Hyde-Tottingham-Pierce Title quotation from: Sid, the pawn shop owner, describing the items he has in his storage unit.
188	11	"What a Lovely Landing Strip"	James Widdoes	Story by : Chuck Lorre & Lee Aronsohn; Teleplay by : Eddie Gorodetsky & Jim Patterson & Don Reo	December 5, 2011	3X6961	15.18
Walden meets up with Zoey again to convince her that, one week after their first date, he is finally over Bridget. As she is sceptical, he proves his intentions by signing his divorce papers in front of her. After that, the two start dating again and things seem to be going great. Walden helps Zoey to get her daughter enrolled in a private kindergarten and they even fly to Mexico in Walden's private jet. This idyll is disturbed when Bridget shows up at Walden's house to tell him that she wants him back. The two go upstairs to have sex and, after pretending that he needs to use the bathroom and asking Alan for advice about what to do, Walden rejects her and suggests that she sign the divorce papers so that they can both move on with their lives (because Alan did not want Walden to sell the house and have to move back into Evelyn's). Bridget is furious that Walden waited to tell her until she was half-naked in his bed and storms out. She then proceeds to drive her car into his house. Later, Bridget is shown standing on the deck, stalking Walden and Zoey. Rose shows up unexpectedly and proposes to "teach" her, an offer that she hesitantly accepts. Title quotation from: Walden, in an English accent, while flying to Mexico for dinner with Zoey.
189	12	"One False Move, Zimbabwe!"	James Widdoes	Story by : Chuck Lorre & Lee Aronsohn; Teleplay by : Jim Patterson & Eddie Gorodetsky & Don Reo	December 12, 2011	3X6962	14.88
Alan spends his first Christmas without Charlie alone. Evelyn is busy engaging in an orgy with two men, and Jake is gone with Eldridge. Walden's mother, Robin (Mimi Rogers), visits for the holiday and Alan's sorrows are immediately forgotten as he becomes smitten with her the moment he sees her. He tries hitting on her numerous times, but fails miserably. During a shared dinner, Robin tells Alan that she is a primatologist and mainly works with gorillas. Walden mentions "Magilla", an imaginary gorilla friend that he had when he was a child. It is then revealed that Magilla really does exist and that Walden shared the first four years of his childhood with him, as his mother wanted to see if a gorilla baby could learn as fast as a human baby. She then had to send him back to the jungle, as he tried to kill a Jehovah's Witness. Walden remembers and is stunned, as he believed that he would be sent to Central Africa just like his gorilla brother if he did not behave. He leaves angrily and, after getting drunk, visits Zoey and her parents, who appear to like him despite his odd behavior. Zoey then calls Walden's mother and Alan, as Walden has climbed on the roof of her apartment house. Alan gets up to him and tells him he knows how painful it is to lose a brother and comforts him, just as the LAPD arrives with a helicopter. In the end, Walden and his gorilla-brother are reunited with the help of his mother and Alan. In a small subplot, Jake and Eldridge, son of Lyndsey (who, according to Alan, has a new boyfriend), are seen spending time together while lying to their parents about their whereabouts. Title quotation from: Walden, accusing his mother for making him live with the constant fear of being sent to Zimbabwe.
190	13	"Slowly and in a Circular Fashion"	James Widdoes	Story by : Chuck Lorre & Ashton Kutcher; Teleplay by : Lee Aronsohn & Eddie Gorodetsky & Jim Patterson	January 2, 2012	3X6963	13.94
When an investment made by Walden goes bad, his ex-wife Bridget and mother Robin, the other two Board Members of his company, Walden Loves Bridget Enterprises, decide to terminate Walden's presidency and make decisions by taking advantage of their vote share. After consulting with Zoey, Walden decides to use his power as the Founder of the company to add Alan as a member of the Board and use his vote to equalize the voting rights thus giving him the tie-breaking vote. Bridget and Robin, finding no loopholes out of this, try to convert Alan. Ultimately, Alan decides to remain loyal to Walden. Once reinstated, Walden uses his presidency powers to rename the company to Walden Loves Alan Enterprises. Alan finally enjoys success, receiving a director's honorarium of $50,000 a year and Walden agrees to add Alan's name on the deed of the house in order to ensure his loyalty. Title quotation from: Alan, to Robin, instructing her on how to move her hand after she places it on his crotch.
191	14	"A Possum on Chemo"	James Widdoes	Story by : Susan Beavers & Susan McMartin; Teleplay by : Chuck Lorre & Eddie Gorodetsky & Jim Patterson	January 16, 2012	3X6964	13.02
When Walden and Zoey are heading out for dinner one night, they spot a lone Alan taking profile pictures for an online dating site. Walden pities him and invites him to join them for dinner, an action that seemingly annoys Zoey. At the restaurant, Walden spots Lyndsey, Alan's former girlfriend. Alan assumes that she is as lonely as he is, and starts to talk to her. Then, a young and rich man named Dylan shows up, turning out to be her date. Alan is confused, but gains new hope when a stoned Eldrige, who is watching Beavis and Butt-Head with Jake, tells him that Dylan is gay and that Lyndsey misses him. Alan immediately heads out to reunite with his former girlfriend, just as Eldrige reveals to Jake that he lied just to get Alan to leave. Before he can ring the bell, Alan hears Lyndsey and Dylan having sex and, being devastated, he leaves. To his surprise, Lyndsey calls him the next day, telling him that she wants to get together. Later, while making out, Lyndsey tells him that she felt too pressured to please a young man like Dylan, as she couldn't let him see her without makeup for fear that he would "think he just nailed his mom", among other issues. She then reveals that she is happy to be with Alan, since, as she puts it, his "standards are so much lower than Dylan's" and she doesn't have to worry about disappointing him, thus she can relax (and even fart) while with him. Alan seems to be all the more confused after hearing this. Meanwhile, Walden finds out that Zoey dislikes his appearance and wants him to shave and cut his hair. Walden is initially reluctant and is assured in his position by Alan. Zoey reveals that an important business party is coming up and that she would "rather not show up with Hipster Jesus". Walden finally agrees (with Berta being revealed as a former prison hairdresser), but then changes his mind again when Alan tells him about the things Judith made him do while they were married. When he shows up at Zoey's place unchanged, they start a fight and Walden runs off after mentioning that he has hopelessly fallen in love with her. Zoey later stops by to apologize, where she is greeted by a newly shaved and cut Walden, who tells her that he wanted to change when no one was nagging him to do it. In the end, Zoey is seen using Alan's bathroom (as she does not want Walden to hear any of her toilet noises), with an understanding Lyndsey agreeing with her. Title quotation from: Alan, telling Zoey what his face looked like when he once tried to grow a beard.
192	15	"The Duchess of Dull-in-Sack"	James Widdoes	Story by : Chuck Lorre & Lee Aronsohn; Teleplay by : Eddie Gorodetsky & Jim Patterson & Don Reo	February 6, 2012	3X6965	13.00
Walden becomes nervous when Zoey does not find their sex appealing anymore, and he's also unhappy that she still does not want him to meet her young daughter. After a chat about his concerns with Alan and a subsequent Skype discussion with Zoey do nothing to set his mind at ease, an eavesdropping Berta suggests he and Zoey try her "special brownies" to spice things up. They do partake of the cannabis-enhanced treats, but Zoey ends up becoming incredibly paranoid and vanishes from the house, sending Walden on a wild goose chase to find her (he asks Jake and Eldridge for help, which they do little to provide because they're even more stoned than Zoey is). Zoey returns safely to the house, eats most of the junk food on hand, and cheerfully admits to Alan she's cold towards him because she really hates him. Walden brings a still-shaky Zoey home the next day, only to find her ex-husband waiting there with their kid. As Zoey and Nigel the ex have a frosty talk, Walden heads inside and immediately bonds with Zoey's daughter, who dubs him "Sir Schmidt". Nigel tells Zoey she has to take her kid for the weekend, but that turns out well when Zoey sees Walden is great with her, and they have a nice afternoon at the zoo. Amazingly, the combination of the zoo and her child being sound asleep is the aphrodisiac Zoey and Walden have been seeking. They plan a follow-up trip to the San Diego Wildlife Center the following week to keep the sexual momentum going. Elsewhere, Jake and Eldridge remain out of it, and Alan tells Jake that he and Lyndsey have no plans to get married—strongly implying they won't repeat the mistakes that led to the existence of their sons. Title quotation from: Berta, about Zoey's lack of enthusiasm during sex.
193	16	"Sips, Sonnets and Sodomy"	James Widdoes	Story by : Eddie Gorodetsky & Jim Patterson & Don Reo; Teleplay by : Chuck Lorre & Lee Aronsohn	February 13, 2012	3X6966	12.45
A major conflict erupts between Zoey and Lyndsey when Zoey off-handedly insults Lyndsey as uneducated and uncultured for not appreciating opera, and then the Harvard and Oxford-educated Zoey and the Santa Monica Community College-single semester attending Lyndsey become much more specific in how much they can't stand each other. The dispute ends up costing Walden and Alan any chance for sex, as Zoey makes exaggerated lovemaking sounds to piss Lyndsey off, and Lyndsey does so in turn. The couples plan to part ways for Valentine's Day—Zoey and Walden heading in his private jet for a romantic night in Cabo San Lucas, Lyndsey and Alan going to a nice B&B near Santa Barbara—but the horrible rainstorm outside causes a major sinkhole right outside the house that strands them all there when the power goes out. Lyndsey finds out her period has begun, and a frightened Alan heads into the maelstrom to buy her tampons; Walden, who is sick of Zoey's rancor towards Lyndsey (and indirectly Alan) decides to take his chances and joins his friend outside. Alan rues the situation, but looks concerned when Walden says he'll have to move out if Zoey and Lyndsey remain blood enemies. At the house, though, the women end up drinking wine ("from Wisconsin") and chatting fairly nicely. Lyndsey compliments Zoey on what a great guy Walden is, and Zoey manages to not insult Alan in her vague response, before Zoey listens to tips from Lyndsey on how to keep her hold on Walden. It turns out Zoey also started her period and has tampons on hand for a grateful Lyndsey, and the women share stories about their terrible ex-husbands, both agreeing that Walden and even Alan are major improvements. Lyndsey calls Alan to tell him to bring along some ice cream. A sudden mudslide, however, sweeps Alan into a raging riverbed. He begs Walden, who is holding on to him, to let him go, as he prefers whatever fate the riverbed holds over returning to the house with their fighting girlfriends. Walden, however, refuses because he does not want to be stuck with Jake. Title quotation from: Alan, describing what he and Lyndsey plan to do for Valentine's Day.
194	17	"Not in My Mouth!"	James Widdoes	Story by : Eddie Gorodetsky & Jim Patterson & Don Reo; Teleplay by : Chuck Lorre & Lee Aronsohn	February 20, 2012	3X6967	13.33
Walden and Zoey are on their way back from their dinner in San Francisco when the jet hits turbulence; in the tense moment, Walden says "I love you" to Zoey, which she does not return. This bugs Walden and he considers breaking it off, especially when he tries to get it out of her as she rushes to London on a business trip. Feeling rejected, Walden meets Zoey's neighbor Jennifer in the elevator and brings her back to the house for a walk on the beach and get better acquainted; Zoey calls Walden to clear up the matter (revealing that she's said it twice only for bad things to happen, once to Nigel and again to Russell Brand), only for Jennifer to walk into the room and ruin the call. Jake is instantly infatuated with Jennifer, and awkwardly attempts to woo her multiple times, telling her that he is 24-and-a-half years old. Alan becomes concerned about Lyndsey's drinking problem, which leads her to vomit all over Alan's bathroom; Berta refuses to clean it up and forces Alan to do it instead, but Jake offers to do it in exchange for $75.00 for a new Call of Duty game so he'll know how to kill terrorists after high school. Walden brings Alan and Lyndsey to London with him to clear up the misunderstanding about Jennifer to Zoey, where Lyndsey drunkenly tries to talk to the guys about love only to vomit all over them, and subsequently the three of them vomit all over the jet. In London, Alan and Walden clear everything up with Zoey, who is still furious. As the guys and Lyndsey begin to leave, Zoey admits she loves Walden, and they reconcile with a kiss. Alan and Lyndsey follow suit, also professing their love to each other and kissing, only for the hungover Lyndsey to vomit in his mouth. Jennifer has sex with Jake (offscreen) while the adults are away, and the episode ends with Jake at the beach house bragging to a friend (presumably, Eldridge) over the phone about how they had sex five times, calling it the best half-hour of his life. Title quotation from: Alan, as a hungover Lyndsey vomits in his mouth during a kiss.
195	18	"The War Against Gingivitis"	James Widdoes	Story by : Chuck Lorre & Lee Aronsohn; Teleplay by : Eddie Gorodetsky & Jim Patterson & Don Reo	February 27, 2012	3X6968	11.92
Tensions rise between Walden and his ex-business partner, Billy (Patton Oswalt) as they try to reconcile and work together to build the "electric suitcase", as Walden finds out that Billy is now having sex with his ex-wife Bridget. Meanwhile, after Lyndsey takes a vacation away from Alan (she won't even tell him where), Alan starts to think that he has no real friends. He then goes to Berta's house since she may now be the closest thing to a real friend he has (and vice versa). Berta sends him to give drug money to her supplier, Shermie, who ends up shooting Alan with a gun, causing him to flee, as the money is short of what Shermie was expecting. When Alan gets home, Walden reveals what the "electric suitcase" is: the two of them managed to tap into the continent's power supply and could turn off the power in any area of their choice, though Alan does not seem to understand the value at all. Title quotation from: Alan, explaining to Walden why he carries a variety of dental floss in his pocket.
196	19	"Palmdale, Ech"	James Widdoes	Story by : Chuck Lorre & Lee Aronsohn; Teleplay by : Eddie Gorodetsky & Jim Patterson & Don Reo	March 19, 2012	3X6969	11.47
Lyndsey's mother is visiting and both Alan and Lyndsey are showing her around Los Angeles. Her mother (Georgia Engel) acts sweetly, but voices disappointment in her daughter and grandson in a similar manner to Alan's own mother, so they introduce them to each other. At first the mothers don't like each other, but they bond and go out after Alan and Lyndsey head home from dinner. In the morning Alan and Lyndsey find their mothers have slept together. Meanwhile, Jake and Eldridge want Walden to hire them as consultants who come up with new app ideas for his company. They get Walden to drive them to a party, but they have the wrong address details, much to Walden's dismay. Title quotation from: Evelyn, when Alan mentions where Lyndsey's mother lives.
197	20	"Grandma's Pie"	James Widdoes	Story by : Eddie Gorodetsky & Jim Patterson & Don Reo; Teleplay by : Chuck Lorre & Lee Aronsohn	April 9, 2012	3X6970	10.40
Walden launches a new software app with his old partner, Billy, and his ex-wife, who both were in on the initial development. Zoey gets upset when she learns about this arrangement, so Walden has a dinner party for all three of them to clear the air. At dinner, Bridget says that there is nothing between her and Walden, though she is condescending to Zoey and accuses her of going after Walden's money. Later, Zoey is on edge until Walden asks her and her daughter to move in with him. Zoey agrees, but tells him that Alan is going to have to move out, sending shivers down Alan's spine. Meanwhile, Lyndsey's mom announces that she is moving to Santa Monica to live with Alan's mother. Evelyn throws a dinner party for everyone and toasts her new partner and the new family they are forming. As usual, Jake and Eldridge miss the point and think it is just two old ladies taking care of each other. Title quote from: Eldridge, on the pie Jean made for dessert, saying he loves it while oblivious to a double entendre.
198	21	"Mr. Hose Says 'Yes'"	James Widdoes	Story by : Lee Aronsohn & Susan Beavers; Teleplay by : Chuck Lorre & Eddie Gorodetsky & Jim Patterson & Don Reo	April 16, 2012	3X6971	11.22
Walden's commitment to Zoey is tested when she and her daughter move in with him. Walden instantly becomes annoyed when he runs out of energy playing with Ava and realizes that she does not like any of the breakfast food he makes for her. Meanwhile, Alan gets more than what he bargained for when he moves in with Lyndsey, then gets into a chain reaction of injuries just to have sex. At a bar, Walden asks Alan to come back if he can get rid of Zoey and Ava, which Alan happily agrees to do. Title quotation from: Alan, to Lyndsey, about his mood for sex after getting a broken nose.
199	22	"Why We Gave Up Women"	James Widdoes	Story by : Chuck Lorre & Lee Aronsohn; Teleplay by : Eddie Gorodetsky & Jim Patterson & Don Reo	April 30, 2012	3X6972	11.32
When Walden has second thoughts about letting Zoey and Ava move in with him, but is unable to convince them to leave, Alan is forced to move out. Just as he is about to leave, Alan goes straight over the edge and begins experiencing chest pains and is taken to the hospital. A doctor reveals to a worried Walden and an uncaring, disbelieving Zoey that Alan has suffered a mild heart attack, but will pull through okay. After brief visits by Walden, Evelyn, Judith, Jake, and Lyndsey, Alan finds a strange woman (Kathy Bates) sitting at the foot of his bed. The stranger introduces herself as the ghost of Charlie, Alan's deceased brother, proving she is who she says she is by answering questions only Charlie could correctly respond to. Charlie goes on to explain that he is in Hell, and as part of his punishment must live eternity as a large, old lady, albeit with a pair of testicles. Charlie explains he came back to give Alan advice: to turn his life around and become self-reliant for once. Alan agrees, and checks himself out of the hospital so Walden won't have to pay any more for his treatment. Alan announces to a compassionate Walden and overjoyed Zoey that he is moving out, and finds a small, run-down apartment to live in. After being visited by Charlie's ghost again (who reveals his intent was not to help Alan, but just to mess with him and get him out of the beach house at last), Alan fakes a second heart attack so he can move back in with Walden, while an annoyed Zoey looks on. Alan passes through the hospital without scrutiny but a clean bill of health, while Charlie attempts to mess with Jake (although failing because Jake doesn't pick up on the hints Charlie is trying to feed him) before returning to Hell with two sexy women dressed in red. Title quotation from: A doctor, thinking Walden is gay, after overhearing an argument between him and Zoey.
200	23	"The Straw in My Donut Hole"	James Widdoes	Story by : Eddie Gorodetsky & Jim Patterson & Don Reo; Teleplay by : Chuck Lorre & Lee Aronsohn & Susan Beavers	May 7, 2012	3X6973	11.43
Everyone but Zoey is being incredibly and unusually nice to Alan when he gets home from the hospital after his non-heart attack: Walden lets him stay at the beach house, Judith tells him not to worry about his lack of up-to-date child support checks until he gets back on his feet, and Lyndsey performs oral sex on him while he eats peach cobbler. Unfortunately, Alan's visit to his cardiologist (Jason Alexander) produces a clean bill of health and the prospect of everyone treating him normally again (meaning, badly). Alan is left with one response: pretend that the news was bad and he might need a heart transplant. However, when Zoey gets proof about Alan's misbehavior, Alan, awaiting his punishment for misbehaving, stupidly attempts (and fails) to fake another heart attack and is left lying on the floor until his shame goes away. Despite this, Alan continues to live at the beach house. Title quote from: Alan, to Zoey, telling her where to put his banana smoothie while getting a back massage
201	24	"Oh Look! Al-Qaeda!"	James Widdoes	Story by : Chuck Lorre & Lee Aronsohn; Teleplay by : Eddie Gorodetsky & Jim Patterson & Don Reo	May 14, 2012	3X6974	11.55
Jake and Eldridge graduate from high school. Alan asks Walden to give them a job; however, Walden points out that they don't have any of the skills that his company needs. His business partner, Billy (Patton Oswalt), does hire them for an overnight shift to look after the hard drives connected to their computer server, and replace any that fail. Walden insists that they don't smoke dope anywhere in or near the building or during their work hours, so they instead start downloading porn. After downloading porn containing a computer virus, they crash the server and all of the hard drives fail. Jake and Eldridge then decide to join the Army based upon a recruiter's sales pitch, "Do you like to play video games?" Alan fears for the boys and the security of America, and steals Jake's application, though unfortunately it is only a copy. The family gives him a teary though half-hearted sendoff. Finally, Jake and Eldridge are seen in basic training, crawling under barbed wire, wondering about their decision. Title quote from: Alan, distracting the army recruiter to steal Jake's enlistment form.

== Critical reception ==
This season received generally mixed reviews. Lori Rackl of the Chicago Sun Times gave the season positive reviews, saying "filling the void left by a well established character isn't easy, but Kutcher mostly succeeded. At times his character seemed a bit like Lennie petting the rabbits in Of Mice and Men, but give him a few episodes, and he should settle in nicely. After eight long seasons, the show might end up being better off with some new blood – of the non-tiger variety." Kutcher's performance in the show was praised by Hollywood.com saying "What makes Ashton a suitable replacement for Charlie Sheen is that he does not need to be the main attraction every half-hour. If the writers want to play with side characters, they can—and Ashton rises to the occasion, fitting comfortably into the bathroom."

== Ratings ==
=== U.S. Nielsen and DVR ratings ===
Order	Episode	Viewers (millions)	18–49	Total	Night	Week	Rating (18–49)	Viewers (millions)	Total viewers (millions)	Total (18–49)
Order	Episode	Viewers (millions)	Rating/Share		Rank		DVR ratings			
1	"Nice to Meet You, Walden Schmidt"	28.74	10.7/25	16.7/24	1	1	1.8	4.09	32.83	12.5
2	"People Who Love Peepholes"	20.52	7.4/17	12.2/18	1	2	1.5	3.56	24.09	8.9
3	"Big Girls Don't Throw Food"	17.71	6.2/14	10.7/15	1	3	1.6	3.46	21.16	7.8
4	"Nine Magic Fingers"	16.20	5.9/14	9.7/14	2	5	1.6	3.28	19.48	7.5
5	"A Giant Cat Holding a Churro"	15.14	5.3/13	9.1/13	2	5	1.7	3.44	18.58	7.0
6	"The Squat and the Hover"	15.29	5.5/13	9.1/13	2	9	1.5	3.26	18.57	7.0
7	"Those Fancy Japanese Toilets"	13.90	4.7/12	8.5/13	2	10	1.5	3.20	17.10	6.2
8	"Thank You for the Intercourse"	14.71	5.2/12	8.9/13	2	9	1.6	3.60	18.31	6.8
9	"Frodo's Headshots"	14.77	5.4/13	8.8/13	2	8	1.5	3.30	17.95	6.9
10	"A Fishbowl Full of Glass Eyes"	15.82	5.2/13	9.6/14	2	6	1.4	2.90	18.72	6.6
11	"What a Lovely Landing Strip"	15.18	5.1/12	9.3/14	1	3	1.2	2.82	17.99	6.3
12	"One False Move, Zimbabwe!"	14.88	4.7/11	9.2/14	1	5	1.3	2.84	17.72	6.0
13	"Slowly and in a Circular Fashion"	13.94	4.5/10	8.3/12	1	7	1.3	2.70	16.64	5.8
14	"A Possum on Chemo"	13.02	4.6/11	7.8/11	2	10	1.3	2.65	15.66	5.9
15	"The Duchess of Dull-in-Sack"	13.00	4.3/10	7.9/12	2	12	1.2	2.74	15.74	5.5
16	"Sips, Sonnets and Sodomy"	12.45	3.9/9	7.8/11	2	9	1.2	2.41	14.87	5.1
17	"Not in My Mouth!"	13.33	4.2/10	8.0/12	2	12	1.0	2.28	15.61	5.2
18	"The War Against Gingivitis"	11.92	3.6/9	7.5/11	3	10	1.3	2.60	14.52	4.9
19	"Palmdale, Ech"	11.47	3.8/9	7.1/11	4	10	1.2	2.42	13.89	5.0
20	"Grandma's Pie"	10.40	3.6/9	6.5/10	3	10	1.1	2.44	12.84	4.7
21	"Mr. Hose Says 'Yes'"	11.22	3.8/10	7.1/11	3	8	1.0	2.31	13.53	4.8
22	"Why We Gave Up Women"	11.32	3.8/9	7.0/10	2	12	1.0	2.18	13.50	4.8
23	"The Straw in My Donut Hole"	11.43	3.8/10	7.0/10	3	13	0.9	TBA	TBA	4.7
24	"Oh Look! Al-Qaeda!"	11.55	3.9/10	7.1/11	3	12	0.9	2.28	13.82	4.8

=== Canadian ratings ===
Order	Episode	Viewers (millions)	Rank (week)
1	"Nice to Meet You, Walden Schmidt"	4.906	1
2	"People Who Love Peepholes"	2.140	6
3	"Big Girls Don't Throw Food"	1.813	15
4	"Nine Magic Fingers"	1.594	21
5	"A Giant Cat Holding a Churro"	1.512	22
6	"The Squat and the Hover"	1.586	18
7	"Those Fancy Japanese Toilets"	1.431	24
8	"Thank You for the Intercourse"	1.431	24
9	"Frodo's Headshots"	1.451	22

=== Australian ratings ===
Order	Episode	Original airdate	Timeslot	Viewers (millions)	Nightly rank	Weekly rank
1	"Nice to Meet You, Walden Schmidt"	September 20, 2011	Tuesday 8:30 pm–9:00 pm	2.315	1	1
2	"People Who Love Peepholes"	September 27, 2011	Tuesday 8:30 pm–9:00 pm	1.250	3	10
3	"Big Girls Don't Throw Food"	October 4, 2011	Tuesday 8:30 pm–9:00 pm	0.994	7	24
4	"Nine Magic Fingers"	October 11, 2011	Tuesday 8:30 pm–9:00 pm	1.035	7	23
5	"A Giant Cat Holding a Churro"	October 18, 2011	Tuesday 8:30 pm–9:00 pm	0.875	11	—
6	"The Squat and the Hover"	October 25, 2011	Tuesday 8:30 pm–9:00 pm	0.964	11^{[a]}	—
7	"Those Fancy Japanese Toilets"	November 1, 2011	Tuesday 8:30 pm–9:00 pm	0.923	15	—
8	"Thank You for the Intercourse"	November 8, 2011	Tuesday 8:30 pm–9:00 pm	0.883	11	—
9	"Frodo's Headshots"	November 15, 2011	Tuesday 8:30 pm–9:00 pm	0.928	9	—N/a
10	"A Fishbowl Full of Glass Eyes"	November 22, 2011	Tuesday 8:30 pm–9:00 pm	0.801	12	—N/a
11	"What a Lovely Landing Strip"	February 14, 2012	Tuesday 8:30 pm–9:00 pm	0.695	16	—N/a
12	"One False Move, Zimbabwe!"	February 14, 2012	Tuesday 9:00 pm–9:30 pm	0.642	17	—N/a
13	"Slowly and in a Circular Fashion"	February 21, 2012	Tuesday 8:30 pm–9:00 pm	0.706	13	—N/a
14	"A Possum on Chemo"	February 21, 2012	Tuesday 9:00 pm–9:30 pm	0.671	15	—N/a
15	"The Duchess of Dull-in-Sack"	February 28, 2012	Tuesday 8:30 pm–9:00 pm	0.619	18	—N/a
16	"Sips, Sonnets and Sodomy"	February 28, 2012	Tuesday 9:00 pm–9:30 pm	0.602	19	—N/a
17	"Not in My Mouth!"	March 13, 2012	Tuesday 9:00 pm–9:30 pm	0.548	—	—N/a
18	"The War Against Gingivitis"	TBA	TBA	TBA	TBA	—N/a
19	"Palmdale, Ech"	TBA	TBA	TBA	TBA	—N/a
20		TBA	TBA	TBA	TBA	—N/a
21		TBA	TBA	TBA	TBA	—N/a
22		TBA	TBA	TBA	TBA	—N/a
23		TBA	TBA	TBA	TBA	—N/a
24		TBA	TBA	TBA	TBA	—N/a

Key
—N/a	Data unavailable
—	Program did not rank in nightly/weekly top shows

Notes

- ^{a} Due to an error in ratings data, "The Squat and the Hover" did not appear in the Australian National Top 20 ratings for the night of broadcast. Based on its figure of 964,000 viewers, the episode would have ranked equal-eleventh for the night.

=== UK ratings ===
Order	Episode	Viewers (millions)
1	"Nice to Meet You, Walden Schmidt"	1.185
2	"People Who Love Peepholes"	—N/a
3	"Big Girls Don't Throw Food"	1.093
4	"Nine Magic Fingers"	1.083
5	"A Giant Cat Holding a Churro"	—N/a
24	"Oh Look! Al-Qaeda!"	0,370
