= People Who Love Peepholes =

- Two and a Half Men episode
- Episode no.: Season 9 Episode 2
- Directed by: James Widdoes
- Written by: Chuck Lorre; Lee Aronsohn; Eddie Gorodetsky; Jim Patterson
- Original air date: September 26, 2011

Guest appearances
- Judy Greer as Bridget Schmidt; Stephanie Jacobsen as Penelope

Episode chronology
← Previous "Nice to Meet You, Walden Schmidt"	Next → "Big Girls Don't Throw Food"
- Two and a Half Men season 9

"People Who Love Peepholes" is the second episode of the ninth season of the American sitcom Two and a Half Men. The 179th overall, the episode was written by series creators Chuck Lorre and Lee Aronsohn, along with Eddie Gorodetsky and Jim Patterson, and directed by James Widdoes. It is also the second part of the two part premiere of the ninth season, and first aired on CBS on September 26, 2011.

== Plot ==
"And don’t worry, I’m not one to overstay my welcome"

— Alan, after Walden lets him move back into the beach house

Walden buys the Harper beach house, and Alan prepares to move in with his mother Evelyn. Walden asks Berta to stay as a live-in housekeeper, an offer which Berta, being attracted to Walden, readily accepts. (She takes great pleasure in taking "Zippy's" room, even telling him her plan). Alan quickly becomes uncomfortable living with his mother again, as she essentially ignores Alan. Disgusting him further, Evelyn tells Alan to come check on her if the date she's going to have rough sex with "can't hear her safe word".

Walden stops by Evelyn's to drop off some of Alan's things he left behind (which are books on how to get women), and invites Alan to go out and do something. Alan, desperate to get away from his mother, quickly agrees. Walden begins talking about his wife, Bridget, who has spurned him, driving more recklessly the more he dwells on the topic. This causes Alan to wet himself out of fear for his life. Eventually, the two pull up to Walden's mansion, where Bridget tells him to get lost. Alan is shocked Walden will not stand down and comply with his wife and is forced to help him hop the fence at his gate to get in. However, once Alan is dragged up with Walden, Bridget warns them she'll turn on the electricity, but Walden says she's bluffing. Terribly wrong, Walden and Alan receive a massive shock to their crotches and fall into Walden's lawn. They recover inside Walden's mansion, being nursed by Bridget. She complains that she is more of a mother than a wife to her husband, as Walden acts immaturely on a regular basis (the entire living room is filled with arcade games and game tables such as foosball). Bridget tells Walden that she does love him, but she couldn't stand the way they lived.

Alan and Walden leave, and wake up the next morning back in Malibu, drunk, naked, and sharing a deck chair and a blanket. Alan is at first horrified he might have done something he might regret, but Walden tells him they went skinny dipping. Further confused, Alan asks who would suggest it. Berta gives an answer from the next lawn chair, covered in a larger blanket. After getting dressed, Alan finds a girl in a bikini named Penelope looking for Charlie. Alan tells her about his death, but that is quickly forgotten as she lays eyes on Walden. The two hit it off and Alan prepares to leave. However, Bridget stops by and Alan ends up saving Walden by claiming Penelope is his girlfriend (much to her disgust) and leading her out. Bridget then apologizes for acting harshly the night before, and offers to give Walden a chance to prove himself. Alan leaves, but is quickly stopped by Walden, who tells Alan that he will do any favor Alan wishes as a "thank you" for all the help Alan has given him. Alan asks to move back into the beach house with Walden, saying he will only stay until he can find another place. Walden agrees, and Alan quietly celebrates moving back in, fully intending to stay for good.

== Production ==
This episode marks the third appearance of Judy Greer on the show. She appeared during the fourth season in the episodes "Smooth as a Ken Doll" and "Aunt Myra Doesn't Pee a Lot" as Judith's sister-in-law Myra. She also appeared during the third season of Lorre's sister show The Big Bang Theory in the episode "The Plimpton Stimulation" as Dr. Elizabeth Plimpton. Starting with this episode, Greer portrays Bridget, Walden's estranged wife. The episode had the show's third highest number of viewers ever and was the third episode to pull in over 20 million viewers.

This episode is also the last to use the original "Manly Men" theme song, the second version debuts in the succeeding episode "Big Girls Don't Throw Food" and is used until "Oh look Al Qaeda" (with one reuse in a season 10 episode, perhaps an error on the editor's behalf). The third and final version debuts in season 10.

== Reception ==
=== Ratings ===
The episode was watched by 20.521 million viewers in its original American broadcast and received a 7.2 rating in the 18–49 demographic. Including DVR ratings, which adds 3.56 million viewers, the episode was watched by 24.09 million viewers.
