= Two and a Half Men season 10 =

Season of television series

Two and a Half Men
- Season 10
- DVD cover art
- Showrunners: Don Reo; Jim Patterson
- Starring: Ashton Kutcher; Jon Cryer; Angus T. Jones; Conchata Ferrell
- No. of episodes: 23

Release
- Original network: CBS
- Original release: September 27, 2012 – May 9, 2013

Season chronology
- ← Previous; Season 9 Next → Season 11

The tenth season of the American television sitcom Two and a Half Men aired on CBS from September 27, 2012 to May 9, 2013.

== Production ==
On May 12, 2012, CBS renewed Two and a Half Men for a tenth season, following the announcement that CBS had closed a one-year deal with stars Ashton Kutcher, Jon Cryer, and Angus T. Jones, Jenny McCarthy, Hilary Duff. Series co-creator Lee Aronsohn did not return to his position as showrunner; he was replaced by executive producers Don Reo and Jim Patterson. On September 6, 2012, the other series co-creator Chuck Lorre signed a deal with Warner Bros. Television to remain executive producer of Two and a Half Men.

Cast members Holland Taylor and Marin Hinkle each made only one brief appearance this season, separately, although their characters were mentioned several times. Taylor had been on Broadway doing a one-woman show about Ann Richards for the majority of the show's season, while Hinkle starred in an NBC drama called Deception, which premiered on January 7, 2013, but the show was canceled on May 7, 2013. Taylor would appear in more episodes in the next season, as confirmed by show runner Jim Patterson. As with Marin Hinkle for the season 9 DVD, the Complete Tenth Season DVD cover dropped Taylor's name and character from the cast list altogether.

=== Angus T. Jones comments ===
In a November 2012 interview with a Christian website, Angus T. Jones revealed that he had recently converted to the Seventh-day Adventist Church. He attacked the show as "filth" that contradicts his moral values and said that he was sick of being a part of it. He also asked fans to stop watching the show. Producers explained that Jones was not expected back on the set until 2013, as his character was not scheduled to appear in the final two episodes before the winter hiatus. In response to the controversy, Charlie Sheen issued a public statement claiming that "Jones' outburst isn't an isolated incident but rather a symptom of the toxic environment surrounding the show" and blamed Chuck Lorre for the outburst. The following day, Jones issued a public apology for his remarks, and explained that he "cannot address everything that has been said or right every misstatement or misunderstanding." Holland Taylor also commented on the outburst, defending the show, saying "Our show is not filth," but stopped short of condemning Jones.

== Cast ==
=== Main ===
- Ashton Kutcher as Walden Schmidt
- Jon Cryer as Alan Harper
- Amber Tamblyn as Jenny
- Angus T. Jones as Jake Harper
- Jennifer Taylor as Chelsea
- Conchata Ferrell as Berta
- Jenny McCarthy as Courtney
- Jenna Elfman as Dharma Finkelstein Montgomery

=== Recurring ===
- Courtney Thorne-Smith as Lyndsey McElroy
- Brooke D'Orsay as Kate
- Sophie Winkleman as Zoey Hyde-Tottingham-Pierce
- Ryan Stiles as Herb Melnick
- Patton Oswalt as Billy Stanhope
- Melanie Lynskey as Rose
- Mimi Rogers as Robin Schmidt
- Judy Greer as Bridget Schmidt

=== Guest ===
- Holland Taylor as Evelyn Harper
- Michael Bolton as himself
- Brit Morgan as Jill
- Bre Blair as Rachel
- Miley Cyrus as Missi
- Lindsay Price as Whitney
- Tricia O'Kelley as Shari
- April Bowlby as Kandi
- Joel Murray as Nick
- Martin Mull as Russell
- Willie Garson as Dr. Steven Staven
- Jaime Pressly as Tammy
- Elizabeth Bogush as Emily
- Elaine Hendrix as Sylvia
- Alicia Coppola as TC Randall
- Marin Hinkle as Judith Harper-Melnick
- Scott Bakula as Jerry
- Emily Osment as Ashley
- Amanda Detmer as Meghan
- George Coe as Victor
- Hilary Duff as Stacey
- Marilu Henner as Linda

== Episodes ==
No. overall	No. in season	Title	Directed by	Written by	Original release date	Prod. code	U.S. viewers (millions)
202	1	"I Changed My Mind About the Milk"	James Widdoes	Story by : Chuck Lorre & Eddie Gorodetsky; Teleplay by : Don Reo & Jim Patterson	September 27, 2012	3X7401	12.54
Walden hires Michael Bolton to help him propose to Zoey on her birthday, but she rejects the proposal and ends up leaving him, saying she has met someone else. After a night of binge drinking, Walden has some of Berta's pot brownies and picks up a woman (Brit Morgan) from Pavlov's later that night. However, while having sex, Walden begins hallucinating about Zoey, his ex-wife Bridget, his mom Robin, and Michael Bolton, and drives his date away. Meanwhile, Jake adjusts to life in the military, sporting a shaved head, and Alan is on edge because any permanent relationship between Walden and Zoey might lead to his eviction from the house. Title quotation from: Walden, to Berta, while eating pot brownies, having just rejected her offer for milk. Note: This episode uses a new opening title sequence and theme switching Walden and Jake, with Walden in Charlie's position on the left side of the microphone, and Jake back in his original position (in the middle) from the original opening sequence wearing his army outfit. The new theme arrangement has Charlie's voice being used for Walden, and Walden's voice being used for Jake.
203	2	"A Big Bag of Dog"	James Widdoes	Story by : Chuck Lorre & Don Reo; Teleplay by : Jim Patterson & Eddie Gorodetsky	October 4, 2012	3X7403	12.33
Shortly after his break up with Zoey, Walden has a breakdown and becomes irritable, taking out his anger on Alan, Robin and his business partner, Billy. After a slight intervention, Walden gets over his break up and gets even with Zoey by getting Ava, her daughter, a large slobbering dog for her birthday. Title quotation from: Walden, to Alan, describing the dog he got from the beach.
204	3	"Four Balls, Two Bats and One Mitt"	James Widdoes	Story by : Don Reo & Jim Patterson; Teleplay by : Chuck Lorre & Eddie Gorodetsky	October 11, 2012	3X7402	11.35
Alan and Lyndsey decide to progress their relationship further by having a pair of threesomes. The first one will involve Walden, the second one a woman of Alan's choice. Alan tells Walden about their plan and Walden agrees to participate. That night, in bed, the threesome goes awry when Lyndsey pays more attention to Walden, making Alan uncomfortable, while Walden begins crying as he is still not over Zoey. Next day, Walden gets a video-call from Zoey wanting to try again, but she overhears Alan talking about the threesome and hangs up. The next night, at Pavlov's, Alan picks up a woman with Lyndsey's help, but this threesome is derailed when the woman meets Walden. Title quotation from: Alan, describing Lyndsey's idea of a threesome.
205	4	"You Do Know What the Lollipop's For"	James Widdoes	Story by : Chuck Lorre & Alissa Neubauer; Teleplay by : Don Reo & Jim Patterson & Eddie Gorodetsky	October 18, 2012	3X7404	13.60
Walden begins to feel his age when a family friend of his, Missi (Miley Cyrus), comes to visit. He mistakes her advances for flirtation, only to find that she really wants to set up Walden with her mother. Missi is revealed early-on to be very talkative, not giving others a chance to get a word in. Jake comes home on a weekend leave from the Army, meets Missi, and is smitten right away. They begin a short affair, but as Jake is leaving to return to base, Missi reveals to him that she has a boyfriend. This leaves Jake wondering how he can compete, but also wishing he "did it" more with her. Title quotation from: Missi, to Walden about the lollipop received at the end of a dentist visit. Note: Alan makes a reference to Ashton Kutcher's film Dude, Where's My Car? in this episode, stating that Walden should cut down on his cannabis consumption.
206	5	"That's Not What They Call It in Amsterdam"	James Widdoes	Story by : Eddie Gorodetsky & Susan McMartin; Teleplay by : Chuck Lorre & Don Reo & Jim Patterson	October 25, 2012	3X7405	12.94
Alan and Lyndsey take Walden out to dinner, where they run into Zoey and her date, Peter. After dinner, Lyndsey, concerned for Walden, decides to set him up with one of her friends. After various double dates with bad results, Walden decides to stay single for a while. He goes out to Pavlov's where he meets Rose (Melanie Lynskey), and after "saving" her from choking to death on a peanut, the two hit it off. This news shocks Alan. He tries to warn Walden about Rose, describing her tactics and history with Charlie, but Walden disregards them, as Rose explained everything to him. Alan remains suspicious of Rose, thinking she is out to get Walden and walks in on the two engaged in a bondage game, thinking Rose has manipulated Walden. At the end of the episode, Rose takes a video-call from Jake at the army base and implies she had been spying on him as well. Title quotation from: Rose, to Alan, about the leaf blower she is using for a bondage game with Walden.
207	6	"Ferrets, Attack!"	James Widdoes	Story by : Chuck Lorre & Don Reo; Teleplay by : Jim Patterson & Eddie Gorodetsky & Matt Ross & Max Searle	November 1, 2012	3X7406	12.65
After a few weeks in the relationship, Walden asks Rose to move in so they can spend more time together. The next day, however, Walden gets a call from Zoey, and the two go out for coffee, where Zoey confesses that she still loves Walden and wants to give the relationship another try. Walden agrees, but does not know how to tell Rose, as she has already moved in. That night, on the deck, Walden tells Rose about Zoey and that he wants to get back together with her. Rose seemingly understands and accepts the decision, but as Walden begins to feel comfortable, Rose sends her ferrets to attack him. She later shows up at Zoey's place and makes it look like Walden knocked her [Rose] up. Zoey confronts Walden about this and, despite Walden telling her the entire true story, ends up leaving him again after finding out that Rose moved in. Later, Alan borrows Walden's car and is attacked by two of Rose's ferrets that she had planted in the car. Title quotation from: Rose, sending her ferrets to attack Walden after he breaks up with her.
208	7	"Avoid the Chinese Mustard"	James Widdoes	Story by : Chuck Lorre & Gemma Baker; Teleplay by : Don Reo & Jim Patterson & Eddie Gorodetsky	November 8, 2012	3X7407	14.07
Walden hires an actress named Whitney (Lindsay Price) to play the part of his girlfriend, but ends up falling for her. Meanwhile, Jake and Missi plan a rendezvous at the beach house, which does not go well when Alan is informed that Jake went AWOL from the army and Jake confesses his feelings for Missi, making her uncomfortable. She convinces Jake to go back to the army, saying she really likes him, but is not serious about a relationship. Afterwards, Walden tells Whitney that he wants a real relationship with her, only to have Whitney tell him that she is a lesbian. Despite this, the two continue their fake relationship. Title quotation from: Missi, to Walden, rambling about the time she ate sample egg rolls at Costco.
209	8	"Something My Gynecologist Said"	James Widdoes	Story by : Chuck Lorre & Jim Patterson; Teleplay by : Don Reo & Eddie Gorodetsky	November 15, 2012	3X7408	13.87
Lyndsey begins to feel concerned about her relationship with Alan because she was recently asked out by her gynecologist. She asks Alan for a commitment, which he does not take lightly. After Alan takes too much time to think about it, he and Lyndsey seemingly break up. However, Alan runs into an elderly widower named Sid Olsen (portrayed by Jon Cryer in heavy makeup) at Pavlov's, who tells him about his marriage, saying how much he loved his wife, even though she was a lousy cook. This convinces Alan to commit to Lyndsey and the two reconcile, finally becoming engaged despite Alan noting that he does not have enough money for even a deposit on a ring. Meanwhile, Walden drives Alan's car to get his bike fixed as the bike will not fit in his own car. Predictably, Alan's car breaks down on the side of the road. Walden is then picked up by a rich older woman (Tricia O'Kelley), who sees him as a poverty-stricken love toy, and when she invites him back to her place he knows what's on the 'menu'. Walden continues to have sex with her, while keeping up the ruse that he is poor and letting her buy him things, until he arrives at her place unannounced one night and finds her with another, even younger man (Steven Krueger). Later, Sid Olsen is on the deck at the beach house with Alan and Walden, and Sid attempts to hit on Berta. Title quotation from: Lyndsey, telling Alan that her gynecologist asked her out on a date.
210	9	"I Scream When I Pee"	James Widdoes	Story by : Chuck Lorre & Don Reo; Teleplay by : Jim Patterson & Eddie Gorodetsky & Steve Tompkins	November 29, 2012	3X7409	13.74
Alan gets a visit from his hot second ex-wife, Kandi (April Bowlby), who became a famous actress in the CSI parody Stiffs and, to the surprise of Walden (who loves the actress and finds her very attractive), wants to get back together with Alan. However, being in a committed relationship with Lyndsey, Alan tries to do the right thing by turning down Kandi and telling Lyndsey. Lyndsey is happy and tearful that Alan turned down a hot celebrity for her, and she engages in an incredibly wild night of sex with him. Lyndsey later sees paparazzi photos of Alan and Kandi looking like they were having sex, when Alan was really trying (successfully) to thwart Kandi's seduction attempt. After Alan fails to clear up the misunderstanding with Lyndsey, Kandi goes over to her house to explain the truth. The two women for no apparent reason end up having sex, which they agree should never be revealed to Alan. Meanwhile, Walden visits Berta on her birthday with a marijuana-laced cupcake, and they get stoned beyond humanly possible. Walden surprises Berta with a new luxury sports car for her birthday, and they mirror the Kandi-Lyndsey agreement by declaring they cannot let Alan (who has a rundown vehicle) know about the gift. Lyndsey, now knowing the truth and rejuvenated from cheating on Alan with Kandi, forgives Alan, while Berta prepares to cheerfully let Alan know of her "good fortune". Title quotation from: Jake, to Alan, bragging about the sexually transmitted disease he has contracted.
211	10	"One Nut Johnson"	James Widdoes	Story by : Don Reo & Jim Patterson & Eddie Gorodetsky; Teleplay by : Chuck Lorre & Steve Tompkins & Alissa Neubauer	December 6, 2012	3X7410	13.50
Walden has tired of dating or even meeting women who are only interested in his vast fortune; he decides to create an online persona as a poor schlub named "Sam Wilson" who is very much like Alan Harper (no job, no prospects, and no charm). When he goes shopping for discount clothing, he meets a wannabe fashion designer named Kate (Brooke D'Orsay) who is currently a salesperson at the store. She agrees to go to dinner with him, and they really hit it off. Kate later meets Alan, after "Sam" tells her that Alan owns the house he lives in. Alan immediately takes on a rich man's persona, and acts like a jerk to both Kate and "Sam". After two weeks of a budding relationship, Kate suggests that "Sam" get out from under Alan's influence and move in with her until he can get on his feet, so Walden heads off and leaves a gleeful Alan at the beach house. While cuddling together, Kate asks "Sam" that they have no secrets or lies between each other. So Walden tells her he is a billionaire, but she does not believe him and laughs off his "joke". Meanwhile, Alan ends up getting drunk and ordering people off his "private beach" while wandering around in an expensive bathrobe and no pants. Title quotation from: Jake, to Alan, about one of his army buddies who lost a testicle on the barbed wire course.
212	11	"Give Santa a Tail-Hole"	James Widdoes	Story by : Chuck Lorre & Matt Ross & Max Searle; Teleplay by : Don Reo & Jim Patterson & Eddie Gorodetsky	December 13, 2012	3X7411	13.35
Still pretending to be the poverty-stricken "Sam Wilson", Walden spends Christmas with Kate, who urges him to get a job to help out with their finances. He then gets a call from his internet business partner Billy, who tells him that they have been offered $800 million for one of their computer programs, the "Electronic Suitcase". Billy wants to sell, but Walden wants to hold out for a higher price. "Sam" gets a job selling Christmas trees, which he takes to immediately and enjoys. Billy stops by the Christmas tree lot multiple times with new offers, urging Walden to sell, but Walden repeatedly shoos him away, saying he will not sell for less than $1.2 billion. Just as "Sam" closes a $55 deal with a Christmas tree customer, Walden and Billy close a deal to sell the Electronic Suitcase for $1.2 billion. After Kate's sewing machine breaks, Walden uses his Christmas tree commissions to buy her a new one for Christmas. Walden feels much happier with Kate in his new blue collar world. Meanwhile, Alan plans to spend Christmas eve with Evelyn, Jake and Lyndsey, but none of them are able to come. Jake plans to spend Christmas with his girlfriend and her children, Evelyn is having plastic surgery, and Lyndsey has to go to Cleveland to help her grandmother, who broke her hip. Alan begins to feel alone and miserable, until a less-than-willing Berta comes to seemingly comfort him. Title quotation from: Kate, realizing a mistake she made on the Santa outfit for her boss' labradoodle.
213	12	"Welcome to Alancrest"	James Widdoes	Story by : Chuck Lorre & Don Reo & Steve Tompkins; Teleplay by : Jim Patterson & Eddie Gorodetsky & Susan McMartin	January 3, 2013	3X7412	15.41
Kate falls into depression after failing to achieve her dream of becoming a fashion designer, so Walden tries to help out. He gives Alan $100,000 to invest in Kate's fashion line, which Alan takes a disliking to, but invests anyway. Meanwhile, Walden's stress of being himself and "Sam Wilson" begins to get to him, causing him to lose his hair, and making him unable to sleep or get an erection. Alan tries to help him with his erection problem by taking him to Charlie's pharmacist, Russell (Martin Mull), who offers weird solutions. After Kate leaves for a fashion show in New York City, Walden decides he will abandon his "Sam" persona and reveal to her who he really is. Stressed about how he is going to do it, Walden spends the next three weeks at Kate's apartment gorging himself with junk food, and becoming fat. Title quotation from: Alan, welcoming Kate and Walden into the house.
214	13	"Grab a Feather and Get in Line"	James Widdoes	Story by : Chuck Lorre & Eddie Gorodetsky & Gemma Baker; Teleplay by : Don Reo & Jim Patterson & Alissa Neubauer	January 10, 2013	3X7413	14.40
Kate is having a fashion show in New York City. Walden, now fed up with his double-life and feeling that Kate might be "the one", finally decides that he should throw away his "Sam Wilson" alias and confess to her who he really is. Walden decides that he and Alan must go to the show so that "Sam" can tell Kate the truth in person. Alan is relishing the trip, and hoping to convince Walden to take him to a Broadway musical. Despondent over Kate's reaction when Walden confesses his lies, the musical comes to them ("You're a Douche"). Title quotation from: Alan, referring to the thin fashion models, after Walden says he feels like throwing up.
215	14	"Run, Steven Staven! Run!"	James Widdoes	Story by : Chuck Lorre & Jim Patterson & Susan McMartin; Teleplay by : Don Reo & Eddie Gorodetsky & Steve Tompkins	January 31, 2013	3X7414	13.70
After Lyndsey waits outside the beach house for an hour before Alan gets home (forcing her to urinate in the shrubs), she gets upset with Alan when he refuses to give her a key to the house. Alan reasons that he cannot give her a key because the house belongs to Walden. When Alan goes to apologize, he discovers that she is going on a date with her gynecologist, Steven Staven (Willie Garson). Meanwhile, Walden is despondent over his breakup with Kate and Billy gets dumped by Walden's ex-wife Bridget. They also run into Herb, who reveals that Judith left him after she caught him cheating on her with his receptionist. The four, bonding over their relationships-gone-bad, go for a night out without picking up any women. While in the hot tub at Herb's place, Walden, Billy and Herb ridicule Alan's reason for leaving Lyndsey, and encourage him to get her back, as he is the only one of the group who has a chance. Walden has no problem with her having a key, and Alan admits he really just wanted some occasional space from Lyndsey. With help from the others, who grab Steven, Alan gives Lyndsey a key and tells her that, while she could do better than him, he could not do better than her. The two reconcile. Steven tells the others that it would not have worked out with him and Lyndsey anyway, and then they have to run from a rottweiler; Herb trips and falls but the others keep running..... Title quotation from: Walden, as he, Steven, Herb and Billy flee from a rottweiler.
216	15	"Paint It, Pierce It or Plug It"	James Widdoes	Story by : Chuck Lorre & Don Reo & Eddie Gorodetsky; Teleplay by : Jim Patterson & Matt Ross & Max Searle	February 7, 2013	3X7415	14.12
Jake brings home his 36-year-old girlfriend, Tammy (Jaime Pressly), and Alan becomes concerned about her and Jake, due to her job as a tattoo artist, her kids and time in prison. Despite her appearance, Tammy is a good-hearted woman, who knows how Alan feels about her and her relationship with Jake. Meanwhile, Jake tells Walden that he plans to marry Tammy in Las Vegas right away, but tells him not to tell Alan. Unfortunately, Walden spills the beans during dinner and Alan and Jake have a falling out over Jake's decision to get married. As they pack for Vegas, Tammy tells Jake she wants their families to be there when (and if) they do get married and tells Jake to make amends with Alan. He does so, and Alan also apologizes, saying he just wants him to be happy. He is relieved that they are not getting married right away and thanks Tammy. Title quotation from: Tammy, about what she can do to nipples as she and Jake plan to get a nipple-gun.
217	16	"Advantage: Fat, Flying Baby"	James Widdoes	Story by : Chuck Lorre & Eddie Gorodetsky & Alissa Neubauer; Teleplay by : Jim Patterson & Don Reo & Steve Tompkins	February 14, 2013	3X7416	13.69
Alan has special Valentine's Day planned for Lyndsey at an expensive hotel and is going to show off his man-scaping which consists of a heart-shaped hair pattern over his manhood. While Lyndsey is anxious to go out, Alan has an accident finishing his surprise and ends up in the hospital. Lyndsey still has the best Valentine's Day ever, getting to drive 95 miles an hour behind a police escort to the hospital. Walden gets a message from Kate that she is in town and wants to see him. Walden still loves her and is eager to see her, but finds out that she just wants to repay his investment in her business because she found a new investor. After Alan convinces him to not give up, Walden shows up at Kate's hotel. She first rejects him, but Walden does talk her into going out to dinner. She would not invite him in after the date, saying she considers this a first date with Walden rather than the continuation of her relationship with "Sam". But after going out on Valentine's Day, the two end up in bed, their relationship apparently renewed; however, she learns the next morning she'll be so busy traveling that they may not get together again any time soon. Later, it is revealed that Kate's new investor is Rose, using the situation to keep her away from Walden. Title quotation from: Alan, referring to Cupid, when Walden eagerly extrapolates that Kate wants to have a baby with him.
218	17	"Throgwarten Middle School Mysteries"	James Widdoes	Story by : Chuck Lorre & Jim Patterson & Nick Bakay; Teleplay by : Don Reo & Eddie Gorodetsky & Gemma Baker	February 21, 2013	3X7417	13.41
Walden views an old video where he discussed his life goals and gets depressed that he does not have a wife and family. Going to a mixer for rich singles, Walden runs into his ex-wife Bridget. Ending up in bed, they seem to make a close renewed connection, but she gets more and more controlling, including telling Alan and Berta that it is best for the household that they leave. Then Walden wakes up and finds Bridget has removed his balls. However, it is then revealed that Walden had imagined the reconciliation with Bridget, and instead he avoids her and walks away. At the last, a flashforward shows Alan and Walden, now elderly and still in the beach house, watching a video of a younger Alan discussing his goal for his old self, which was to remain living in the beach house. Title quotation from: Walden, at the mixer, talking to an author about her books.
219	18	"The 9:04 from Pemberton"	James Widdoes	Story by : Chuck Lorre & Jim Patterson & Eddie Gorodetsky; Teleplay by : Don Reo & Steve Tompkins & Alissa Neubauer	March 7, 2013	3X7418	13.54
After Alan accidentally starts a fire in the kitchen, resulting in a power outage, Walden is far from happy. Alan tries to make it up by buying Walden a new but cheap toaster, causing a fight when Walden criticizes the toaster's low quality, and Alan ends up moving out. He tries to move in with Lyndsey, but is kicked out after refusing to share the bills with her, and he instead moves in with a lonely Herb. Walden finds himself lonely without Alan and tries to get him back, but Herb is overjoyed with having Alan keep him company and does not want him to go back, and therefore isolates Alan from Walden. When Herb and Walden begin to argue over Alan, Alan decides to go back to Walden as he needs him more. However, after seeing Alan attempt to masturbate on the couch, Walden calls Herb and suggests they share custody of Alan. Title quotation from: Herb, announcing his model train's arrival after Alan sounds a train horn.
220	19	"Big Episode. Someone Stole a Spoon"	James Widdoes	Story by : Chuck Lorre & Don Reo & Gemma Baker; Teleplay by : Jim Patterson & Eddie Gorodetsky & Susan McMartin	March 14, 2013	3X7419	12.18
Walden twists his testicles doing yoga and Herb examines him at his office. Afterwards, he asks Walden for advice on breakups, so Walden shares three things that helped him get over Bridget (pot, sleeping around, and buying a beach house), inspiring Herb to move on with his life. They bring two gorgeous young pharmaceutical representatives from Herb's office to Walden's house, and have a wild party on the deck. Walden gets an extreme hangover the next morning, but Herb is ready to continue partying and he makes everyone Bloody Marys. Next day, both Walden and Alan wake up hung over, while Herb is throwing yet another wild party at the house. Alan and Walden tell Herb to go back to his home, but Herb gets offended before he leaves. They later find him in a motel, very high, wearing body paint and a diaper, so they reluctantly call Judith to take him back. Later, Herb seems much happier at his office as he finishes a check-up on Walden, saying things are back to normal. But then Walden notices that Herb's new receptionist is a hot young blonde woman who was at the most recent house party. Title quotation from: Alan, to Walden, about the episode of Downton Abbey he is watching on TV.
221	20	"Bazinga! That's from a TV Show"	James Widdoes	Story by : Chuck Lorre & Jim Patterson & Eddie Gorodetsky; Teleplay by : Don Reo & Matt Ross & Max Searle	April 4, 2013	3X7420	13.71
Home for the weekend, Jake tells Alan and Walden that he and Tammy broke up because of their "unrecognizable" differences. However, an angry Tammy shows up and confronts Jake, revealing that Jake is sleeping with her daughter, Ashley. Alan and Walden try to make the two work out their differences, but it gets out of hand when Ashley (Emily Osment) shows up and declares her love for Jake. It gets worse when Jerry, Ashley's ex-boyfriend (Scott Bakula), shows up and tries to win her back. At Pavlov's, Walden and Tammy have a heart-to-heart talk, and Tammy later gives the young couple her blessing. Unfortunately, Jerry comes back later that night and proposes to Ashley, winning her acceptance with the promise of a Mercedes Benz. Alan comforts Jake who is now alone, while, out on the deck, Walden and Tammy end up making out. Title quotation from: Jake, while bragging to Alan and Walden about his new position in the army's kitchen: it refers to The Big Bang Theory, in which 'Bazinga' is a catchphrase used by the character Sheldon Cooper. Guest star Emily Osment later appears in "The Big Bang Theory" spin-off, "Young Sheldon", as Mandy McCalister. Note: In the end credits, Emily Osment's character is listed as "Amy".
222	21	"Another Night with Neil Diamond"	James Widdoes	Story by : Chuck Lorre & Don Reo & Steve Tompkins; Teleplay by : Jim Patterson & Eddie Gorodetsky & Nick Bakay	April 25, 2013	3X7421	11.32
Lyndsey stuns Alan by breaking up with him. Although he is initially devastated, the next morning, Alan cheerfully explains to Walden that he and Lyndsey "break up" all the time and get back together when Alan apologizes. However, when he goes to see her, he is outraged to learn that Lyndsey has begun dating a man named Nick, and Alan injures himself venting his anger. Later, he heads out in his car to spy on Lyndsey and Nick, joined by a cheerful Herb. Alan tries to spot Lindsey and Nick from a tree, but he falls and badly injures his neck, made worse by hearing Lyndsey having very loud sex with Nick. Lyndsey asks Walden to tell Alan to stop trying to communicate with her by phone and texts, and Walden manages to stop Alan from heading out again. Alan is despondent, and even Berta reluctantly tries to lift his spirits, while Walden takes Alan to Pavlov's to cheer him up. He introduces Alan to Nick's ex-wife (Jessica Lundy), who has also been spying on Lyndsey and Nick, and she invites Alan to have revenge sex. Title quotation from: Berta, when a depressed Alan sarcastically asks her what she wants.
223	22	"My Bodacious Vidalia"	James Widdoes	Story by : Chuck Lorre & Don Reo & Jim Patterson & Eddie Gorodetsky; Teleplay by : Gemma Baker & Matt Ross & Max Searle	May 2, 2013	3X7422	12.12
With Alan still depressed over his breakup with Lindsey, Walden sends him off to get a complete makeover. Even with his weird 1970s makeover, Alan manages to hook up with a dim-witted blonde named Meghan (Amanda Detmer). She takes him home, where Alan finds that she has a 92-year-old comatose husband named Victor (George Coe). While Walden watches Victor, the couple hook up in Alan's bedroom. Later, Victor is thought to have died, so they rush him back to Meghan's place, so his relatives won't know she was having an affair, but on the ride back, they get a surprise. Later, when Alan and Meghan are again hooking up, Victor gives them another surprise. Title quotation from: Alan, describing his new body make over underneath his body forming suit.
224	23	"Cows, Prepare to Be Tipped"	James Widdoes	Story by : Chuck Lorre & Alissa Neubauer & Susan McMartin; Teleplay by : Don Reo & Jim Patterson & Eddie Gorodetsky	May 9, 2013	3X7423	12.83
Jake comes home on leave and announces that he is going to be stationed in Japan for at least a year, so Jake and Alan go on a father-son bonding trip to the Grand Canyon. Jake tells Alan that he used to think the divorce was entirely Alan's fault, but after seeing Judith marry then leave Herb, now realizes that it was at least partly her fault. At a hotel for a night, they kick back and smoke the last of Charlie's Cuban cigars which Alan reveals he originally planned on smoking with Jake whenever he graduated from college, which they both laugh heartily over. Alan gives Jake some money, much to his surprise, and Jake tells Alan how much he has meant to him over the years, especially living in a luxurious beach house, even after his uncle's death. Touched, Alan reluctantly gives Jake some more money. On the edge of the Grand Canyon, they enjoy a beautiful sunrise, until Jake has thunderous gas with quite an echo. Meanwhile, Walden dates a ditzy 22-year-old named Stacey (Hilary Duff), but becomes more interested in her attractive and accomplished grandmother, Linda (Marilu Henner). Last appearance as a main character: Jake Harper Title quotation from: Alan in the car, excited about his father-son trip with Jake.

== Ratings ==
=== U.S. Nielsen and DVR ratings ===
Order	Episode	Viewers (millions)	18–49 Rating	Weekly rank	Viewers (millions)	Rating (18–49)	Total viewers (millions)	Total (18–49)
Order	Episode	Viewers (millions)	Live ratings		DVR ratings			
1	"I Changed My Mind About the Milk"	12.54	3.5	11	—N/a	1.0	—N/a	4.5
2	"A Big Bag of Dog"	12.33	3.6	10	—N/a	—N/a	—N/a	—N/a
3	"Four Balls, Two Bats and One Mitt"	11.35	3.5	16	2.42	1.1	13.77	4.6
4	"You Do Know What the Lollipop's For"	13.60	4.0	6	2.09	1.0	15.74	5.0
5	"That's Not What They Call It in Amsterdam"	12.94	3.7	9	2.13	1.0	15.07	4.7
6	"Ferrets, Attack!"	12.65	3.6	9	2.26	1.0	14.92	4.6
7	"Avoid the Chinese Mustard"	14.07	4.0	4	2.43	1.1	16.51	5.1
8	"Something My Gynecologist Said"	13.87	4.1	7	2.34	1.0	16.21	5.1
9	"I Scream When I Pee"	13.74	4.0	9	1.94	0.9	15.69	4.9
10	"One Nut Johnson"	13.50	4.0	4	2.15	1.0	15.65	5.0
11	"Give Santa a Tail-Hole"	13.35	4.1	7	2.25	1.0	15.61	5.1
12	"Welcome to Alancrest"	15.41	4.5	4	2.20	1.0	17.61	5.5
13	"Grab a Feather and Get in Line"	14.40	4.2	7	2.04	0.8	16.44	5.0
14	"Run, Steven Staven! Run!"	13.70	3.9	10	1.92	0.8	15.62	4.7
15	"Paint It, Pierce It or Plug It"	14.12	4.1	7	2.19	—N/a	16.30	—N/a
16	"Advantage: Fat, Flying Baby"	13.69	3.8	3	2.16	—N/a	15.85	—N/a
17	"Throgwarten Middle School Mysteries"	13.41	3.9	10	2.35	1.0	15.76	4.9
18	"The 9:04 from Pemberton"	13.54	3.9	5	2.24	0.9	15.78	4.8
19	"Big Episode. Someone Stole a Spoon"	12.18	3.3	5	2.14	0.8	14.37	4.2
20	"Bazinga! That's from a TV Show"	13.71	3.9	9	2.22	0.9	15.93	4.8
21	"Another Night with Neil Diamond"	11.32	2.8	13	2.38	1.0	13.70	3.8
22	"My Bodacious Vidalia"	12.12	3.2	7	2.26	0.9	14.38	4.1
23	"Cows, Prepare to Be Tipped"	12.83	3.5	6	2.16	—N/a	14.99	—N/a
