= List of awards and nominations received by Two and a Half Men =

Two and a Half Men awards and nominations
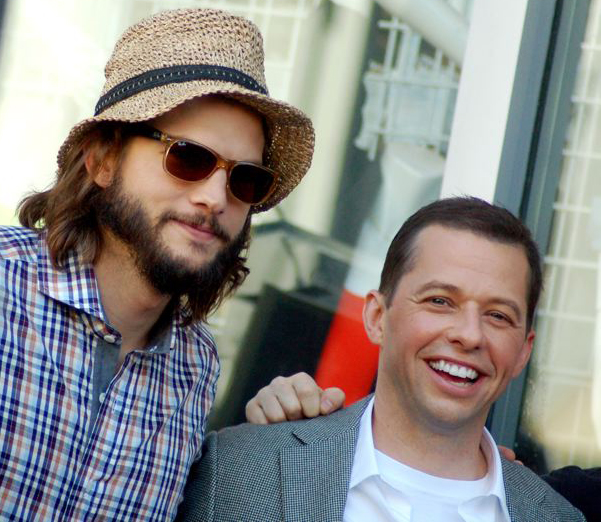
- Ashton Kutcher (left) and Jon Cryer (right) on Two and a Half Men
Awards and nominations
Award	Wins	Nominations
ALMA Awards	1	2
Emmy Awards	9	46
Golden Globe Award	0	2
Screen Actors Guild Awards	0	3
Teen Choice Awards	1	8
People's Choice Awards	4	6

Totals (Note: Certain award groups do not simply award one winner. They acknowledge several different recipients, have runners-up, and have third place. Since this is a specific recognition and is different from losing an award, runner-up mentions are considered wins in this award tally. For simplification and to avoid errors, each award in this list has been presumed to have had a prior nomination.)
- Wins: 15
- Nominations: 67

Two and a Half Men is an American television sitcom created by Chuck Lorre and Lee Aronsohn that premiered on CBS on September 22, 2003, and ended on February 19, 2015, after twelve seasons consisting of 262 episodes. Originally starring Charlie Sheen, Jon Cryer, and Angus T. Jones, the show was about a hedonistic jingle writer, Charlie Harper; his uptight brother Alan; and Alan's son Jake. After Alan divorces, he moves with his son to share Charlie's beachfront Malibu house and complicates Charlie's freewheeling life.

The show has received multiple award nominations. It has been nominated for 46 Primetime Emmy Awards (winning six technical awards, one for Kathy Bates for Outstanding Guest Actress in a Comedy Series as The Ghost of Charlie Harper, and two for Jon Cryer as Alan Harper), and has also received two Golden Globe Award nominations for Charlie Sheen for Best Actor in a Television Series – Musical or Comedy. The show won the award for Favorite TV Comedy at the 35th People's Choice Awards.

== Primetime Emmy Awards ==
Year	Category	Nominee	Result
2004	Outstanding Original Main Title Theme Music	Lee Aronsohn, Grant Geissman, Chuck Lorre	Nominated
2004	Outstanding Cinematography for a Multi-Camera Series	Steven V. Silver (for "Camel Filters and Pheremones")	Nominated
2004	Outstanding Art Direction for a Multi-Camera Series	John Shaffner, Ann Shea (for "Alan Harper, Frontier Chiropractor")	Nominated
2005	Outstanding Supporting Actress in a Comedy Series	Holland Taylor (as "Evelyn Harper")	Nominated
2005	Outstanding Supporting Actress in a Comedy Series	Conchata Ferrell (as "Berta")	Nominated
2005	Outstanding Multi-Camera Sound Mixing for a Series or Special	Bob La Masney, Charlie McDaniel, Kathy Oldham, Bruce Peters (for "Can You Eat Human Flesh with Wooden Teeth?")	Won
2005	Outstanding Multi-Camera Picture Editing for a Series	Joe Bella (for "It Was Mame, Mom")	Nominated
2005	Outstanding Cinematography for a Multi-Camera Series	Steven Silver (for "Back Off, Mary Poppins")	Nominated
2005	Outstanding Art Direction for a Multi-Camera Series	John Shaffner, Ann Shea (for "It Was 'Mame', Mom"/"A Low, Guttural Tongue Flapping Noise")	Nominated
2006	Outstanding Supporting Actor in a Comedy Series	Jon Cryer (as "Alan Harper")	Nominated
2006	Outstanding Multi-Camera Sound Mixing for a Series or Special	Bob La Masney, Charlie McDaniel, Kathy Oldham, Bruce Peters (for "The Unfortunate Little Schnauzer")	Nominated
2006	Outstanding Multi-Camera Picture Editing for a Series	Joe Bella (for "That Special Tug")	Won
2006	Outstanding Lead Actor in a Comedy Series	Charlie Sheen (as "Charlie Harper")	Nominated
2006	Outstanding Guest Actor in a Comedy Series	Martin Sheen (as "Harvey")	Nominated
2006	Outstanding Comedy Series	Lee Aronsohn, Mark Burg, Oren Koules, Chuck Lorre, Eric Tannenbaum and Kim Tannenbaum, executive producers; Susan Beavers, Don Foster and Eddie Gorodetsky, co-executive producers; Mark Roberts, supervising producers; Michael Collier, produced by	Nominated
2006	Outstanding Cinematography for a Multi-Camera Series	Steven V. Silver (for "Carpet Burns and a Bite Mark")	Nominated
2007	Outstanding Supporting Actress in a Comedy Series	Holland Taylor (as "Evelyn Harper")	Nominated
2007	Outstanding Supporting Actress in a Comedy Series	Conchata Ferrell (as "Berta")	Nominated
2007	Outstanding Supporting Actor in a Comedy Series	Jon Cryer (as "Alan Harper")	Nominated
2007	Outstanding Multi-Camera Picture Editing for a Series	Joe Bella (for "Release the Dogs")	Won
2007	Outstanding Lead Actor in a Comedy Series	Charlie Sheen (as "Charlie Harper")	Nominated
2007	Outstanding Comedy Series	Chuck Lorre, Lee Aronsohn, Eric Tannenbaum, Kim Tannenbaum, Mark Burg and Oren Koules, executive producers; Don Foster, Eddie Gorodetsky, Susan Beavers and Mark Roberts, co-executive producers; Michael Collier and Jim Patterson, producers	Nominated
2007	Outstanding Cinematography for a Multi-Camera Series	Steven Silver (for "Release the Dogs")	Won
2008	Outstanding Supporting Actress in a Comedy Series	Holland Taylor (as "Evelyn Harper")	Nominated
2008	Outstanding Supporting Actor in a Comedy Series	Jon Cryer (as "Alan Harper")	Nominated
2008	Outstanding Sound Mixing for a Comedy or Drama Series (half-hour) and Animation	Bruce Peters, Kathy Oldham, Charlie McDaniel, Bob La Masney (for "Is There a Mrs. Waffles?")	Nominated
2008	Outstanding Makeup for a Multi-Camera Series or a Special (non-prosthetic)	Janice Berridge, Peggy Nichols, Shelly Woodhouse-Collins, Gabriel Solana (for "City of Great Racks")	Nominated
2008	Outstanding Lead Actor in a Comedy Series	Charlie Sheen (as "Charlie Harper")	Nominated
2008	Outstanding Hairstyling for a Multi-Camera Series or a Special	Pixie Schwartz, Krista Borrelli, Ralph M. Abalos, Janice Zoladz (for "City of Great Racks")	Nominated
2008	Outstanding Comedy Series	Chuck Lorre, Lee Aronsohn, Eric Tannenbaum, Kim Tannenbaum, Mark Burg and Oren Koules, executive producers; Don Foster, Eddie Gorodetsky, Susan Beavers and Mark Roberts, co-executive producers; Jim Patterson, producer; Michael Collier, produced by	Nominated
2009	Outstanding Supporting Actor in a Comedy Series	Jon Cryer (as "Alan Harper")	Won
2009	Outstanding Lead Actor in a Comedy Series	Charlie Sheen (as "Charlie Harper")	Nominated
2010	Outstanding Supporting Actor in a Comedy Series	Jon Cryer (as "Alan Harper")	Nominated
2010	Outstanding Supporting Actress in a Comedy Series	Holland Taylor (as "Evelyn Harper")	Nominated
2010	Outstanding Guest Actress in a Comedy Series	Jane Lynch (as "Dr. Linda Freeman")	Nominated
2010	Outstanding Cinematography for a Half-Hour Series	Steven V. Silver (for "Crude and Uncalled For")	Nominated
2010	Outstanding Hairstyling for a Multi-Camera Series or Special	Pixie Schwartz, Krista Borrelli, Ralph Abalos, Janice Allison (for "That's Why They Call It Ballroom")	Nominated
2010	Outstanding Sound Mixing for a Comedy or Drama Series (Half-Hour) and Animation	Bruce Peters, Bob LaMasney, Kathy Oldham (for "Fart Jokes, Pie and Celeste")	Nominated
2011	Outstanding Supporting Actor in a Comedy Series	Jon Cryer (as "Alan Harper")	Nominated
2011	Outstanding Cinematography for a Multi-Camera Series	Steven V. Silver (for "Hookers, Hookers, Hookers")	Won
2012	Outstanding Lead Actor in a Comedy Series	Jon Cryer (as "Alan Harper")	Won
2012	Outstanding Cinematography for a Multi-Camera Series	Steven V. Silver (for "Sips, Sonnets and Sodomy")	Won
2012	Outstanding Multi-Camera Picture Editing for a Comedy Series	Joseph Bella (for "Why We Gave Up Women")	Nominated
2012	Outstanding Guest Actress in a Comedy Series	Kathy Bates (as "Charlie Harper")	Won
2013	Outstanding Cinematography for a Multi-Camera Series	Steven V. Silver (for "Grab a Feather and Get in Line")	Nominated
2013	Outstanding Art Direction for a Multi-Camera Series	John Schaffner, Ann Shea, Francoise Cherry-Cohen (for "Avoid the Chinese Mustard")	Nominated

== Golden Globe Awards ==
Year	Category	Nominee	Result
2004	Best Performance by an Actor in a Television Series – Musical or Comedy	Charlie Sheen (as "Charlie Harper")	Nominated
2005	Best Performance by an Actor in a Television Series – Musical or Comedy	Charlie Sheen (as "Charlie Harper")	Nominated

== Screen Actors Guild Awards ==
Year	Category	Nominee	Result
2005	Outstanding Performance by a Male Actor in a Comedy Series	Charlie Sheen (as "Charlie Harper")	Nominated
2010	Outstanding Performance by a Male Actor in a Comedy Series	Charlie Sheen (as "Charlie Harper")	Nominated
2012	Outstanding Performance by a Male Actor in a Comedy Series	Jon Cryer (as "Alan Harper")	Nominated

== Teen Choice Awards ==
Year	Category	Nominee	Result
2007	Choice TV: Actor Comedy	Charlie Sheen as "Charlie Harper"	Nominated
2008	Choice TV: Comedy Series	Two and a Half Men	Nominated
2008	Choice TV Actor: Comedy	Charlie Sheen as "Charlie Harper"	Nominated
2009	Choice TV Actor: Comedy	Charlie Sheen as "Charlie Harper"	Nominated
2012	Choice TV Actor: Comedy	Ashton Kutcher as "Walden Schmidt"	Nominated
2013	Choice TV Actor: Comedy	Ashton Kutcher as "Walden Schmidt"	Nominated
2013	Choice TV: Scene Stealer Female	Miley Cyrus	Won
2014	Choice TV Actor: Comedy	Ashton Kutcher as "Walden Schmidt"	Nominated

== People's Choice Awards ==
Year	Category	Nominee	Result
2004	Favorite New TV Comedy	Two and a Half Men	Won
2007	Favorite TV Comedy	Two and a Half Men	Won
2008	Favorite TV Comedy	Two and a Half Men	Won
2009	Favorite TV Comedy	Two and a Half Men	Won
2011	Favorite TV Comedy	Two and a Half Men	Nominated
2012	Favorite Network TV Comedy	Two and a Half Men	Nominated

== ALMA Awards ==
Year	Category	Nominee	Result
2008	Outstanding Actor in a Comedy Series	Charlie Sheen as "Charlie Harper"	Won
2009	Outstanding Actor in a Comedy Series	Charlie Sheen as "Charlie Harper"	Nominated
