= Two and a Half Men season 8 =

Two and a Half Men
- Season 8
- DVD cover art
- Showrunner: Lee Aronsohn
- Starring: Charlie Sheen; Jon Cryer; Angus T. Jones; Marin Hinkle; Conchata Ferrell; Holland Taylor
- No. of episodes: 16

Release
- Original network: CBS
- Original release: September 20, 2010 – February 14, 2011

Season chronology
- ← Previous; Season 7 Next → Season 9

The eighth season of the American television sitcom Two and a Half Men aired on CBS from September 20, 2010 to February 14, 2011.

The season was the last season with Charlie Sheen as its main star, who was replaced by Ashton Kutcher in the following season. Being composed of 16 episodes, the season was the shortest season of the series up to that time, although the twelfth and final season would later have the same number of episodes.

== Cast ==
=== Main ===
- Charlie Sheen as Charlie Harper
- Jon Cryer as Alan Harper
- Angus T. Jones as Jake Harper
- Marin Hinkle as Judith Harper-Melnick
- Conchata Ferrell as Berta
- Holland Taylor as Evelyn Harper

=== Recurring ===
- Courtney Thorne-Smith as Lyndsey MacElroy
- Graham Patrick Martin as Eldridge MacElroy
- Ryan Stiles as Herb Melnick
- Melanie Lynskey as Rose
- Kelly Stables as Melissa
- Jenny McCarthy as Courtney

=== Guest ===
- Judd Nelson as Chris MacElroy
- J.D. Walsh as Gordon
- Steve Hytner as Dr. Schenkman
- Erinn Hayes as Gretchen
- Liz Vassey as Michelle
- Martin Mull as Russell
- Nadia Bjorlin as Jill
- Macey Cruthird as Megan
- Tonita Castro as Esmeralda
- Carl Reiner as Marty Pepper
- Jane Lynch as Dr. Linda Freeman
- Dakin Matthews as Father Shaunassey

== Production ==
Many reports of Sheen partying in Las Vegas, going on alcoholic binges, and dating pornstars had been over the Internet from early January 2011 and CBS had expressed its concern. Early in the morning of January 27, Sheen was rushed to hospital suffering from severe abdominal pains after holding a party at his house in which he allegedly smoked crack cocaine. After being released from the hospital, Sheen checked himself into rehab, causing the show to be put on hiatus, with production scheduled to resume on February 28. The season was originally ordered for 24 episodes, but due to Sheen entering rehab, the episode count was cut to 20. On February 24, 2011, it was announced that the show would shut down production for the rest of the season and cancel the remaining four episodes, due to Sheen making offensive comments about Chuck Lorre, the creator and lead writer of Two and a Half Men, on the February 24 edition of a radio broadcast hosted by Alex Jones. On March 7, 2011, Sheen was fired from the show. After much speculation over whether Sheen would return to the series after all, Lorre announced in April 2011 that he had new plans to reboot Two and a Half Men with Jon Cryer in a lead role alongside a new character. Ashton Kutcher was later hired to portray the new character, Walden Schmidt.

== Episodes ==
No. overall	No. in season	Title	Directed by	Written by	Original release date	Prod. code	U.S. viewers (millions)
162	1	"Three Girls and a Guy Named Bud"	James Widdoes	Story by : Chuck Lorre & Lee Aronsohn; Teleplay by : Don Foster & Jim Patterson & Eddie Gorodetsky	September 20, 2010	3X6451	14.63
Alan has been having a relationship with Lyndsey, the mom of Jake's best friend, Eldridge. When Jake finds out, he stops visiting on weekends and moves in with Judith and Herb permanently, until Alan apologizes to Jake there; Jake gets caught sneaking two girls out of his room; Charlie decides to quit boozing (although all he really does is switch to beer and wine) after a drunken attempt to mail his pants back to the fabric inspector. Title quotation from: Charlie, explaining orgies to Alan after the two witness girls sneaking out of Jake's room.
163	2	"A Bottle of Wine and a Jackhammer"	James Widdoes	Story by : Chuck Lorre & Lee Aronsohn & Susan Beavers; Teleplay by : Don Foster & Eddie Gorodetsky & Jim Patterson	September 27, 2010	3X6452	13.92
Lyndsey tells Alan that she loves him, and asks him to move in with her. At first Alan declines, but after learning that it would upset Judith, he decides to go ahead with the idea, and Charlie bribes Eldridge and Jake with money so that they agree to the circumstances. Later on, Alan encounters Melissa at a wine shop, lies by saying he is single, and then takes her back to Charlie's house to have sex with her. Title quotation from: Charlie, repeating what Alan told him is needed to get Lyndsey stimulated sexually.
164	3	"A Pudding-Filled Cactus"	James Widdoes	Story by : Chuck Lorre & Lee Aronsohn & David Richardson; Teleplay by : Don Foster & Eddie Gorodetsky & Susan Beavers	October 4, 2010	3X6453	14.37
After having sex with Melissa, Alan finds it hard to let go. He carries on seeing her at Charlie's house and acting as if he still lives there. Eventually, he takes advice from Charlie and Evelyn and ends it with Melissa by text message – causing her to take her anger out on Charlie. Upon his return to Lyndsey's, Alan accidentally sets fire to her curtains, causing a mass fire and leaving them homeless. Title quotation from: Alan, lying to Lyndsey and describing how Charlie is prickly on the outside but a sweetheart on the inside.
165	4	"Hookers, Hookers, Hookers"	James Widdoes	Story by : Don Foster & Eddie Gorodetsky & Susan Beavers; Teleplay by : Chuck Lorre & Lee Aronsohn & Jim Patterson	October 11, 2010	3X6454	13.47
After moving into Charlie's house, Lyndsey, Alan, Jake and Eldridge face that they have lost everything with the house fire. Charlie makes fun of them, but forgets his cellphone in the ruin. Going there to get it he meets Lyndsey's ex-husband Chris (Judd Nelson). Later, they are joined by Herb, pizza boy Gordon and Alan. Lyndsey comes to get Alan but ends up going for coffee with Chris. Gordon has to get back to work, Herb has to leave after Judith's call, Charlie returns to his home with a deaf hooker and Alan is left alone in the roof-less ruin. Title quotation from: Charlie, checking his phone book for a silent hooker.
166	5	"The Immortal Mr. Billy Joel"	James Widdoes	Story by : Chuck Lorre & Lee Aronsohn & Don Foster; Teleplay by : Eddie Gorodetsky & Susan Beavers & Jim Patterson	October 18, 2010	3X6455	13.54
The episode starts with Alan handing Jake a check for a school trip. Alan becomes depressed after realizing he is broke and lonely. While Charlie heads off to Vegas (although he's really getting cosmetic surgery), Alan pretends to be him. He manages to bring home a woman (Erinn Hayes) he met at the bar, however, she knows that he isn't Charlie. She admits that she and Charlie broke up because he didn't like her role-playing games. Alan ends up going to bed with the woman, but ends up having to dress like Hitler as part of her "game." Title quotation from: Alan, naming the artist of the song that he is about to play on the piano.
167	6	"Twanging Your Magic Clanger"	James Widdoes	Story by : Lee Aronsohn & Don Foster; Teleplay by : Chuck Lorre & Eddie Gorodetsky & Jim Patterson	October 25, 2010	3X6456	13.77
Charlie has been dating a woman, Michelle (Liz Vassey), who is four years older than he is, and has trouble adjusting. Matters get even more complicated when he meets Michelle's 20-year-old, bisexual, amateur porn-star daughter and is tempted. Meanwhile, Alan learns that Jake won't visit for the weekend and decides to spend a little "me time", which consists of masturbating in his room, on the sofa, and in the car; but when he does it in a movie theater, he gets arrested, and Charlie neglects to bail him out because he is having sex with Michelle. Title quotation from: Charlie, talking about Alan's masturbating on the couch.
168	7	"The Crazy Bitch Gazette"	James Widdoes	Story by : Chuck Lorre & Lee Aronsohn; Teleplay by : Don Foster & Eddie Gorodetsky & Jim Patterson	November 1, 2010	3X6457	13.64
When Charlie's new girlfriend Michelle (Liz Vassey) finds out about Rose, she is freaked out about his stalker; she later asks Charlie if he loves Rose and when they both realize he does, she gently but firmly ends their relationship. Rose then tells Charlie she's marrying someone named Manfred Quinn. Charlie doesn't believe her, so he and Alan drive to the church, where the wedding is supposed to take place. As they look through the window, they find Rose getting married and Charlie is left to lament his lost love. However, after they leave, it is revealed that everyone in the church, except for Rose and the priest, are mannequins. Title quotation from: Charlie, suggesting the fictional newspaper where Rose's wedding announcement would appear.
169	8	"Springtime on a Stick"	James Widdoes	Eddie Gorodetsky & Jim Patterson	November 8, 2010	3X6458	13.63
After Charlie ruins Jake's date, Jake vows revenge. When Evelyn's date cancels on her birthday, Jake sees his opportunity to get back at Charlie: he suggests to Alan that they should have a birthday party for Evelyn at Charlie's house. Later that day, Evelyn asks to go to a pharmacist so she can get some birth control pills. She meets Russell, Charlie's pharmacist, and Charlie and Alan decide to set the two up. However, the plan backfires when Russell shows up to dinner with a 30-year-old woman – who ends up having sex with Evelyn. Title quotation from: Russell, describing a drug-laced Popsicle.
170	9	"A Good Time in Central Africa"	James Widdoes	Story by : Don Reo; Teleplay by : Eddie Gorodetsky & Jim Patterson	November 15, 2010	3X6459	14.25
Berta takes off work for a few days to attend her family reunion and lines up a replacement, Esmeralda. When Esmeralda turns out to be a much better worker than Berta, Charlie and Alan don't want to let Esmeralda go. Meanwhile, Lyndsey decides she doesn't want to get back together with her ex-husband, Chris, and hooks up with Alan again. Then, Alan fears an angry Chris is stalking, threatening, and planning to kill him. Title quotation from: Charlie, explaining why it's useful to know how to say "I love you" in several different languages.
171	10	"Ow, Ow, Don't Stop"	James Widdoes	Story by : Chuck Lorre & Lee Aronsohn; Teleplay by : Susan Beavers & Don Reo & David Richardson	November 22, 2010	3X6460	14.39
When Courtney (last seen going to prison in "Fish in a Drawer") returns, Charlie gets back together with her. However, she takes advantage of him, making him go on limitless spending sprees for her and injuring him during sex. Eventually, Charlie realizes she is just using him and they break up. But later, after talking with Alan on the deck, Charlie decides to chase after her and get her back, crashing through the glass back door in the process. The episode ends with Courtney visiting Charlie in the hospital, and Charlie shallowly declaring his love for her again. Title quotation from: Charlie, covered in lacerations after crashing through a glass door, being kissed by Courtney.
172	11	"Dead from the Waist Down"	James Widdoes	Story by : Susan Beavers & David Richardson & Don Reo; Teleplay by : Chuck Lorre & Lee Aronsohn	December 6, 2010	3X6461	13.41
Alan is destitute as usual, and cannot afford to get Lyndsey a nice birthday gift. He tries raising money by offering massages at the mall, but blows the small amount he earned by buying a "pearl necklace" made out of mints. He considers dipping into Jake's college fund, thinking Jake has no interest in college anyway, but then Jake says he does want to go to college after seeing a porn movie featuring topless female students. Refusing to take the money Charlie offers him, Alan resorts to stealing a pair of earrings from Judith, and has to think quickly to hide Lyndsey's "new earrings" when the two couples show up at the same restaurant. Meanwhile, Courtney takes Jake clothes shopping with Charlie's credit card against Charlie's will. Title quotation from: Alan, thinking Lyndsey wants to have sex with him, after his money-earning efforts have left him exhausted.
173	12	"Chocolate Diddlers or My Puppy's Dead"	James Widdoes	Story by : Chuck Lorre; Teleplay by : Eddie Gorodetsky & Jim Patterson	December 13, 2010	3X6462	13.95
Charlie and Courtney have grown tired of having sex with each other and decide to break up. Over the next few days, Charlie's behavior becomes increasingly erratic, from writing a depressing song for a new kids' cereal to collapsing in bed with Alan and Lyndsey. After crashing Jake and Eldridge's party at Judith's house, Charlie decides it's time to revisit his psychiatrist, Dr. Freeman (Jane Lynch) to get the help he needs. Later on, he and Alan watch Glee together. Title quotation from: Charlie and Alan, describing the dark overtone Charlie took for his "Chocolate Diddlers" jingle.
174	13	"Skunk, Dog, Crap and Ketchup"	James Widdoes	Story by : Alissa Neubauer; Teleplay by : Chuck Lorre & Lee Aronsohn & Don Reo & David Richardson	January 3, 2011	3X6463	15.36
Alan wakes Lyndsey up one night with his sleep-talking. While getting a drink of water, Lyndsey begins talking to Charlie, and the two bond over the love for betting on sports. When Alan learns of this, his paranoia kicks in, and he and Lyndsey have a fight when she wants to invite Charlie to her new house-warming party. Alan spies on the two, but is sprayed by a skunk in the process, and shows up embarrassing Lyndsey in front of her guests. Charlie later tries to tell Lyndsey to give Alan another chance, but this is jeopardized by Alan spying on them again and calling them a bastard (Charlie) and a slut (Lyndsey) because he thinks they are meeting as more than friends. Title quotation from: Alan, giving Lyndsey an answer to her question "What is that smell?"
175	14	"Lookin' for Japanese Subs"	James Widdoes	Story by : Chuck Lorre & Lee Aronsohn; Teleplay by : Eddie Gorodetsky & Susan Beavers & Jim Patterson	January 17, 2011	3X6464	15.56
A few months after her "marriage", Rose bumps into Charlie at the supermarket. Old feelings are rekindled, and Charlie realizes that he loves her. After going to Rose's house and being turned away, the roles are reversed and Charlie stalks Rose, even climbing over the balcony of her deck like she does. Rose continues to reject him, saying that she is now a married woman and must remain faithful to her "husband" Manny. Eventually, Charlie persuades Rose to have an affair with him, and the two end up sleeping together. Meanwhile, Jake and Eldridge film Jackass-style stunts, including swallowing Diet Coke and Mentos to make a "Human Volcano", riding down the roof in a shopping cart, and attempting a fart-propelled launch into the ocean. Title quotation from: Alan, seeing Charlie using his binoculars on the deck, spying on his neighbor/stalker Rose.
176	15	"Three Hookers and a Philly Cheesesteak"	James Widdoes	Eddie Gorodetsky & Jim Patterson	February 7, 2011	3X6465	15.15
Alan discovers that a fellow chiropractor's business is doing extremely well. Seeing as how they started their businesses at the same time and under similar circumstances, Alan determines the reason his business is failing and the other is booming is because of advertising. Alan decides to buy advertising space for all different kinds of media, and asks Charlie for a loan of $5,000 with which to buy the ad space. Charlie hands it over with no questions asked, and Alan, seeing how easy it was, decides to ask his mother for money, too. Evelyn gives $10,000, and Alan realizes that he has come up with a brilliant plan. He offers to let Herb in on a great "business deal," and Herb gives Alan $15,000. Alan pays Charlie back his initial investment of $5,000 plus 20% interest, and Charlie decides to give Alan back all $6,000 plus more, hoping even more interest will be generated by leaving the money in Alan's "advertising fund" longer. Doing the same with Evelyn, Herb, Berta, and even Judith, Alan begins to feel guilty, until he has a conversation with his reflection in the mirror and decides he should take advantage of his good fortune; sort of a reward after years of being stepped on. Meanwhile, Charlie continues his affair with Rose. Gordon, Charlie's pizza delivery man, discovers that Rose's "husband" Manny is really a mannequin, and unsuccessfully tries to tell Charlie. Title quotation from: Charlie, telling Alan what he can get for $5,000.
177	16	"That Darn Priest"	James Widdoes	Story by : Chuck Lorre & Lee Aronsohn; Teleplay by : Susan Beavers & David Richardson & Don Reo	February 14, 2011	3X6466	14.51
When Rose wants to invest in Alan's "business", she visits his office and finds out about his scheming and threatens to tell everyone. Alan panics at first, but then he realizes that he can tell Rose's "husband" about her cheating. While over at her house, he finds out that her "husband" Manny Quin is really a mannequin and the penny finally drops on his name. Rose offers Alan the $50,000 he needs to pay everyone back to keep her secret from Charlie, but Alan decides that his loyalty to Charlie is more important; Charlie then insults Alan about moving out after he tells Charlie it's a bad idea to marry Rose, and Alan decides to take the money, pay everyone back, and keep Rose's secret to himself while she and Charlie take a weekend away to Paris. Charlie does "meet" Manny when retrieving something from Rose's closet, but thinks it's just a dummy Manny uses for his fashion designing work. After Charlie grabs Rose's raincoat, the couple head for the airport for their trip to Paris. Final appearance of: Charlie Harper Title quotation from: Alan's evil side, with whom Alan is arguing in the mirror.

== Reception ==
Critical reception to the eighth season of Two and a Half Men was mixed. On the review aggregator Rotten Tomatoes, the season holds an approval rating of 63% based on eight reviews, with an average rating of 6.2/10.

== Ratings ==
=== US Nielsen ratings ===
Order	Episode	Rating	Share	Rating/Share (18–49)	Viewers (millions)	Rank (Timeslot)	Rank (Night)
1	"Three Girls and a Guy Named Bud"	8.9	13	4.9/12	14.63	#1	#1
2	"A Bottle of Wine and a Jackhammer"	8.5	13	4.8/12	13.92	#1	#1
3	"A Pudding-Filled Cactus"	8.6	13	4.5/11	14.37	#2	#2
4	"Hookers, Hookers, Hookers"	8.2	12	4.5/11	13.47	#2	#2
5	"The Immortal Mr. Billy Joel"	8.2	12	4.4/11	13.54	#2	#2
6	"Twanging Your Magic Clanger"	8.3	12	4.4/11	13.77	#2	#2
7	"The Crazy Bitch Gazette"	8.2	12	4.7/11	13.62	#2	#2
8	"Springtime on a Stick"	8.3	12	4.3/11	13.63	#2	#2
9	"A Good Time in Central Africa"	8.6	13	4.5/11	14.25	#1	#1
10	"Ow, Ow, Don't Stop"	8.6	13	4.5/12	14.39	#1	#1
11	"Dead from the Waist Down"	8.1	12	4.2/10	13.41	#1	#1
12	"Chocolate Diddlers or My Puppy's Dead"	8.5	13	4.2/11	13.95	#1	#1
13	"Skunk, Dog, Crap and Ketchup"	9.2	14	4.7/12	15.36	#1	#1
14	"Lookin' for Japanese Subs"	9.3	14	4.6/11	15.56	#1	#1
15	"Three Hookers and a Philly Cheesesteak"	9.1	14	4.4/11	15.15	#1	#1
16	"That Darn Priest"	8.7	14	4.2/12	14.51	#1	#1

=== Canadian ratings ===
Order	Episode	Viewers (millions)	Rank (week)
1	"Three Girls and a Guy Named Bud"	1.326	27
2	"A Bottle of Wine and a Jackhammer"	1.065	—N/a
3	"A Pudding-Filled Cactus"	—N/a	—N/a
4	"Hookers, Hookers, Hookers"	1.376	25
5	"The Immortal Mr. Billy Joel"	1.185	30
6	"Twanging Your Magic Clanger"	1.267	26
7	"The Crazy Bitch Gazette"	1.153	—N/a
8	"Springtime on a Stick"	—N/a	—N/a
9	"A Good Time in Central Africa"	—N/a	—N/a
10	"Ow, Ow, Don't Stop"	1.234	26
11	"Dead from the Waist Down"	1.837	11
12	"Chocolate Diddlers or My Puppy's Dead"	2.237	3
13	"Skunk, Dog, Crap and Ketchup"	1.664	14
14	"Looking for Japanese Subs"	2.266	6
15	"Three Hookers and a Philly Cheesesteak"	2.285	6
16	"That Darn Priest"	2.405	9

=== Australian ratings ===
Order	Episode	Original airdate	Timeslot	Viewers (millions)	Nightly rank	Weekly rank
1	"Three Girls and a Guy Named Bud"	18 October 2010	Monday 7:30 pm–8:00 pm	1.471	1	2
2	"A Bottle of Wine and a Jackhammer"	25 October 2010	Monday 7:30 pm–8:00 pm	1.409	1	4
3	"A Pudding-Filled Cactus"	1 November 2010	Monday 7:30 pm–8:00 pm	1.330	3	12
4	"Hookers, Hookers, Hookers"	8 November 2010	Monday 7:30 pm–8:00 pm	1.374	2	5
5	"The Immortal Mr. Billy Joel"	31 January 2011	Monday 7:30 pm–8:00 pm	1.243	4	12
6	"Twanging Your Magic Clanger"	7 February 2011	Monday 7:30 pm–8:00 pm	1.220	6	11
7	"The Crazy Bitch Gazette"	14 February 2011	Monday 7:30 pm–8:00 pm	0.998	9	24
8	"Springtime on a Stick"	21 February 2011	Monday 7:30 pm–8:00 pm	1.060	7	15
9	"A Good Time in Central Africa"	28 February 2011	Monday 7:30 pm–8:00 pm	0.982	9	25
10	"Ow, Ow, Don't Stop"	7 March 2011	Monday 7:30 pm–8:00 pm	0.903	10	36
11	"Dead from the Waist Down"	14 March 2011	Monday 7:30 pm–8:00 pm	1.005	10	20
12	"Chocolate Diddlers or My Puppy's Dead"	21 March 2011	Monday 7:30 pm–8:00 pm	1.126	7	15
13	"Skunk, Dog, Crap and Ketchup"	21 March 2011	Monday 8:00 pm–8:30 pm	1.171	6	12
14	"Lookin' for Japanese Subs"	28 March 2011	Monday 7:30 pm–8:00 pm	0.972	8	26
15	"Three Hookers and a Philly Cheesesteak"	28 March 2011	Monday 8:00 pm–8:30 pm	0.719	17	59
