= That Darn Priest =

- Two and a Half Men episode
- A behind the scenes shoot of Cryer and Lynskey in That Darn Priest
- Episode no.: Season 8 Episode 16
- Directed by: James Widdoes
- Written by: Chuck Lorre; Lee Aronsohn; David Richardson; Don Reo
- Production code: 3X6466
- Original air date: February 14, 2011

Guest appearance
- Dakin Matthews as Father Shaunassey

Episode chronology
| ← Previous "Three Hookers and a Philly Cheesesteak" | Next → "Nice to Meet You, Walden Schmidt" |
- Two and a Half Men season 8

"That Darn Priest" is the season finale of the eighth season of the American sitcom Two and a Half Men, and the 177th episode overall. Written by series creators Chuck Lorre and Lee Aronsohn, along with David Richardson and Don Reo, and directed by James Widdoes, the episode is the final appearance of Charlie Sheen as Charlie Harper, and originally aired on CBS on February 14, 2011. The episode is the sixteenth episode of the season, though it was meant to be the fifth to last episode, but the season was cut short due to Sheen's problems related to drug and alcohol abuse. Three weeks after the episode's original airing, Sheen was fired from the show. CBS and Warner Bros. later announced that Ashton Kutcher would join the show's cast as Sheen's replacement.

Upon airing, the episode was watched by 14.51 million household viewers, and received positive reviews upon airing, with viewers unaware it was to be the final episode of the season, or the final episode to include Charlie Sheen.

== Plot ==
Alan goes to a Catholic church to attempt to have his sins forgiven, after scamming Charlie, Herb, Evelyn, and Berta out of thousands of dollars. However, when Father Shaunassey suggests he tell his family, Alan rejects the suggestion. Meanwhile, Charlie has grown tired of having to sneak around during his controversial affair with his stalker, Rose, despite the fact that her husband, Manny, will arrive home that evening. Charlie suggests that he and Rose take a weekend away, much to her delight. Alan continues to see his evil side, which encourages him to continue collecting money from his relatives. Alan attempts to admit the truth to Charlie, but Charlie reveals that Rose is willing to invest, and Alan decides to continue lying.

Alan allows Rose to invest, but is surprised when Rose shows up at his office and discovers the scam. Alan fears that Rose will reveal the scheme, and attempts to blackmail her about her infidelity. While at Rose's house attempting to blackmail her, Alan discovers that Manny is a mannequin and that Rose is stringing Charlie along. Rose offers to give Alan enough money to pay everyone back, but Alan refuses to betray Charlie and leaves. Alan returns home, only to find Berta wanting her money back. While Alan ponders whether to take Rose's money with his evil side, Charlie arrives announcing his intention to propose to Rose in Paris. Charlie insults Alan about moving out after Alan tells Charlie it is a bad idea. Alan decides to take Rose's money and keeps the truth to himself. Despite a close call when he finds Manny in Rose's closet, Charlie fails to realize what Rose has been hiding. The episode ends when Charlie departs for Paris with Rose, while Alan pays back the money that he scammed after he received payment from Rose. While talking with his dark side again, Alan is outraged when his light side, a version of himself wearing women's clothes and makeup, appears in the toaster and starts criticizing his fashion sense. When Alan asks his light side if there are any more versions of himself, the light side asks, "Who else do you need?"

== Production ==
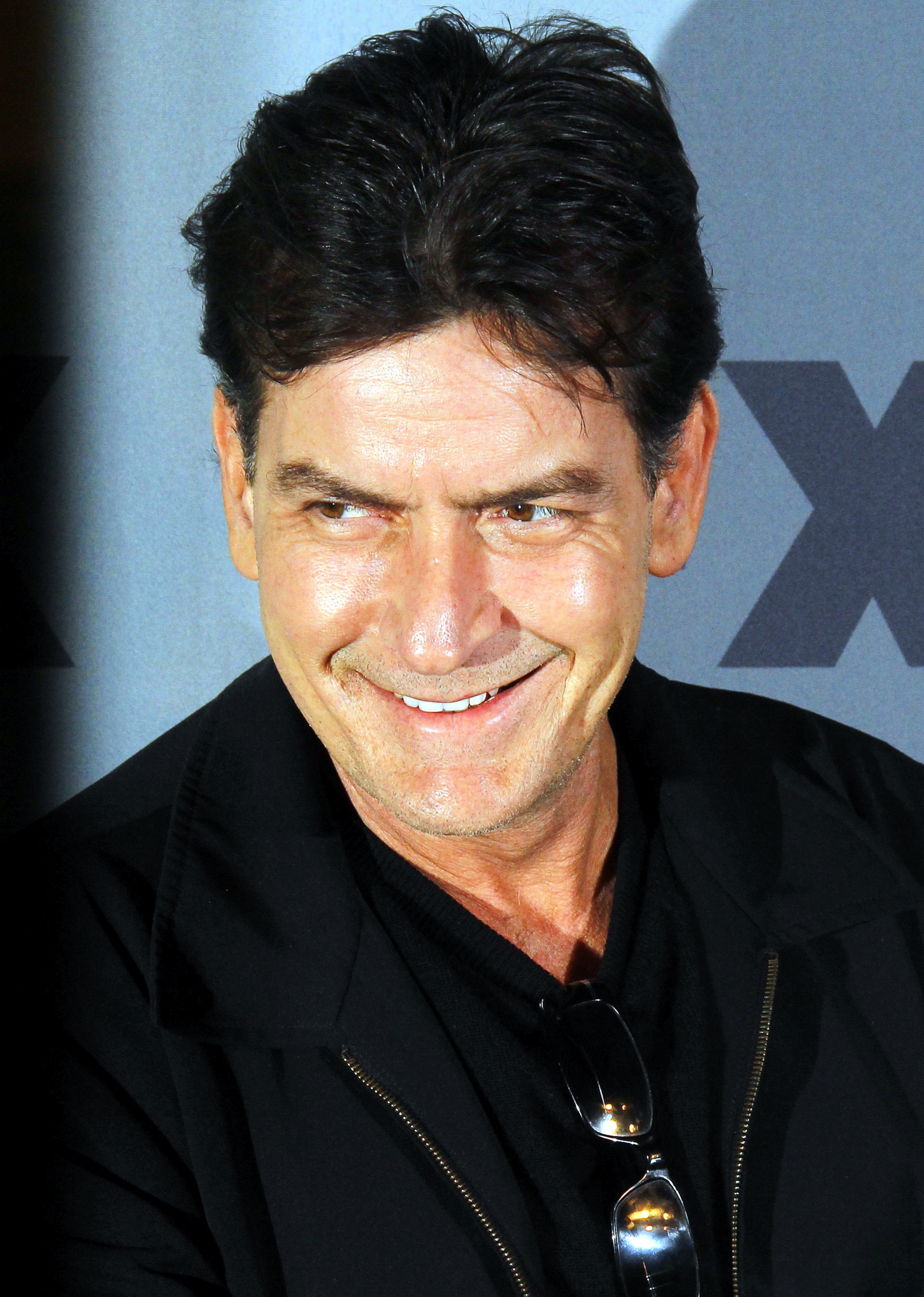
"That Darn Priest" marked Charlie Sheen's final appearance in the series. His character was killed off in the following episode.

On January 27, 2011, Sheen was taken to Cedars-Sinai Medical Center by paramedics. Sheen's representative said he was suffering from "severe abdominal pains." On January 28, Sheen began undergoing a substance rehabilitation program in his home and CBS announced that the show would go on hiatus. The network subsequently announced that the current season, already under way and due to shoot its last four episodes, had been canceled after Sheen made derogatory comments about the series' creator Chuck Lorre on the February 24 edition of a radio broadcast hosted by Alex Jones. On February 28, it was reported that Warner Bros. banned Sheen from entering the studio production lot.

On February 28, 2011, during a national television interview in his home, Sheen publicly demanded a 50% raise for the show. Already the highest-paid actor on television, Sheen demanded $3 million per episode, claiming that in comparison to the amount that the series was making, he was "underpaid." He later retracted that demand. A March 3, 2011, telephone survey of 1,000 people found that 71% of them had an unfavorable impression of Sheen and 16% had a positive opinion of him. On March 7, 2011, CBS and Warner Bros. fired Sheen from the show after eight seasons. The official statement read: "After careful consideration, Warner Bros. Television has terminated Charlie Sheen's services on Two and a Half Men effective immediately." In the aftermath of his dismissal, Sheen remained vocally critical of Lorre, and repeatedly attacked him in an eight-minute Ustream video. On May 13, 2011, CBS and Warner Bros. announced that Ashton Kutcher would replace Sheen on the show.

== Reception ==
According to Nielsen Ratings, the episode saw relatively low ratings in comparison to others in the season, with 14.51 million household American viewers tuning in. "Three Hookers and a Philly Cheesesteak", which had aired the previous week, had scored over half a million more with 15.15 household viewers. However, the episode received a rating of 4.2/12 in the 18-49 demographic, and received a rating of 8.7.

The episode received positive reviews upon airing, with viewers unaware it was to be the final episode of the season, or the final episode to include Charlie Sheen. Eric Hochberger of TV Fanatic enjoyed the episode and noted that Cryer's portrayal of Alan's dark side was a highlight.
