= Magic Music =

Magic Music may refer to:

- Magic Music, 1980 album by Third Ear Band
- "Magic Music" (song), song by Kaela Kimura, 2006
- "Magic Music" song by Williams, Welch, Palmer recorded by Donald Peers 1961, Gogi Grant 1962

== See also ==
- 40 Years in the Making: The Magic Music Movie
