= Life... and Stuff =

1997 American sitcom TV series

- Genre: Sitcom
- Created by: Rick Reynolds; Lee Aronsohn
- Starring: Rick Reynolds; Pam Dawber; Fred Applegate; David Bowe
- Composer: Rick Marotta
- Country of origin: United States
- Original language: English
- No. of seasons: 1
- No. of episodes: 6 (3 unaired)

Production
- Running time: 30 minutes
- Production companies: Somers-Teitelbaum-David; Perrgood Productions; TriStar Television

Original release
- Network: CBS
- Release: June 6 – June 20, 1997

Life... and Stuff is an American sitcom that was produced by Somers-Teitelbaum-David, Perrgood Productions and TriStar Television that aired on CBS from June 6 to June 20, 1997 starring Rick Reynolds.

== Plot ==
Advertising executive Rick Boswell, and his wife, Ronnie, are a couple married ten years and feeling overwhelmed by life. Sharing their home are their two young sons and Rick's man-child brother.

== Cast ==
- Rick Reynolds as Rick Boswell
- Pam Dawber as Ronnie Boswell
- Fred Applegate as Bernie Skabinsky
- Tanner Lee Prairie as Jerry Boswell
- Kevin Keckeisen as Shawn Boswell
- David Bowe as Andy Boswell

== Episodes ==
No.	Title	Directed by	Written by	Original release date
1	"The First One"	Andy Cadiff	Rick Reynolds & Lee Aronsohn	June 6, 1997
2	"Life...and Fisticuffs"	Andy Cadiff	Lee Aronsohn	June 13, 1997
3	"Life...and Therapy"	Andy Cadiff	Rick Reynolds	June 20, 1997
4	"Life...and Matchmaking"	N/A	N/A	Unaired
5	"Life...and the Spirit of Sunday"	N/A	N/A	Unaired
6	"Life ... and the Way We Were"	N/A	N/A	Unaired
