= Monika Smith =

Canadian actor

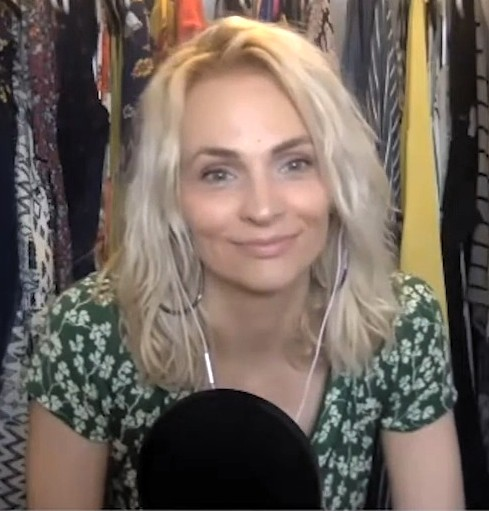
Smith in 2021

Monika Smith is a Canadian actress, writer, and comedian from the Upright Citizens Brigade Theatre and The Second City in Los Angeles.

== Career ==
Smith has been seen on Who Gets the Last Laugh?, as Kiki on Two and a Half Men, The Newsroom, Newsreaders, The Joe Schmo Show: The Full Bounty, Nick Swardson's Pretend Time, Disaster Date, Players, and in sketches on The Tonight Show with Conan O'Brien and Conan.

She has performed at Upright Citizens Brigade Theatre Los Angeles and UCBNY, The Second City Toronto Touring Company, and at The Second City L.A., Chicago Improv Festival, iO Chicago, iO West, Del Close Marathon, and more. Smith can be seen in UCB's Inside The Master Class, and currently performs in Asssscat at UCB, Maple Donut, Rough Cut: The Improvised Movie, and her solo improv show.
