= 40 Years in the Making: The Magic Music Movie =

- Theatrical release poster
- Directed by: Lee Aronsohn
- Written by: Lee Aronsohn
- Produced by: Fleur Saville
- Cinematography: Dean Cornish
- Edited by: Kyle Vorbach
- Music by: Magic Music
- Production company: Magic Music Movie
- Distributed by: The Orchard; Paladin
- Release date: 2017
- Running time: 99 minutes
- Country: United States
- Language: English

40 Years in the Making: The Magic Music Movie is a 2017 American documentary film written and directed by comedy writer Lee Aronsohn about Magic Music, a folk music band that broke up in 1975 before ever releasing a record. They were big in Boulder, Colorado, where Aronsohn attended University of Colorado Boulder. After Aronsohn's retirement from The Big Bang Theory, Aronsohn decided to make the documentary about the band and try to get them to reunite to play one more show.

40 Years in the Making: The Magic Music Movie had its world premiere at the Woodstock Film Festival in 2017. It also appeared at the Napa Valley Film Festival in 2017, and the Boulder International Film Festival, The Richmond Film Festival, the Intendence Film Festival, and others in 2018. It made its theatrical debut at the Village East in New York City on August 3, 2018.

== Premise ==
Veteran Television Producer Lee Aronsohn can't get the music of his favorite college band out of his head even though they broke up in 1975 without ever releasing a record. He endeavors to find the scattered members of Magic Music, and get them to reunite to play one more time together. He also tells the story of the band, and what happened to each member after the breakup.

== Release ==
40 Years in the Making: The Magic Music Movie was released in a limited theatrical engagement by Paladin starting August 3 in New York. The Orchard released the film digitally on September 4, 2018.

=== Critical response ===
Reviews have generally been positive. The Victoria Advocate wrote an enthusiastic review saying "Prepare to have your mind blown. To put it into perspective, imagine watching a documentary about Led Zeppelin and discovering their music at the very same time. Once you become acquainted with the harmonious vocals and infectious hooks delivered by the Colorado folk group the sounds of Crosby, Stills & Nash and Jethro Tull come to mind. Magic Music had the potential to go all the way so it’s such a tragedy that these guys never became a household name. Thanks to Aronsohn the rest of the world can get a taste of the sounds that drove the filmmaker to bring the band's story to prominence 42 years after they called it quits."

Film Journal said "the documentary has long ceased to be just about the band but about something eternal. Yes, time can heal wounds both real and perceived. But with even more time, there's more than healing. After enough time you have the perspective to look back on certain youthful friends and realize you have something in common with them as with virtually no one else: You survived. The fires you both experienced didn't burn you to death—and almost no one else knows what it was like to survive those particular fires. There is magic in this film's ode to growing old and being with the people who knew us young." and Tony Medley describing it thus in The Larchmont Chronicle, "Told with personal interviews with all the band members of a 1970s Colorado band that didn't make it, along with clips of their music, archival videos, and stills, it is a captivating tale."

=== Soundtrack ===
40 Years in the Making: The Magic Music Movie Official Soundtrack will be released by The Orchard on September 14. The release features the original, never-before released recordings of Magic Music's songs from the 1970s, as well as tracks recorded for the reunion concert in the film.
