= Rick Reynolds =

American dramatist

- Born: December 13, 1951 (age 74); Wood Village, Oregon, US
- Education: Portland State University (BS)
- Occupations: Actor; writer; comedian

Rick Reynolds (born December 13, 1951) is an American comedian known for his one-man shows Only the Truth Is Funny and All Grown Up...and No Place to Go. Only the Truth Is Funny began as a theatrical show and was eventually broadcast on Showtime and nominated for a 1993 Emmy Award for writing.

== Early life and education ==
Reynolds was born in Wood Village, Oregon, a suburb of Portland. His father drowned when Rick was six months old. His manic depressive mother brought in several stepfathers, who were abusive. He graduated from Portland State University in 1976 with a Bachelor of Science in philosophy.

== Career ==
In 1997, Reynolds starred in the short-lived sitcom Life... and Stuff, which he also co-created. Prior to the release of Life... and Stuff Reynolds was quoted at a press conference saying, "If this is canceled, and my whole career has worked toward this point . . .," Reynolds said, letting the thought hang. "Who am I kidding? Is it going to happen again? I'm not a great-looking guy and I'm 45 now. This is it. So, of course, I'll be devastated."

== Personal life ==
Reynolds married his first wife attending college. He met his second wife, Lisa, in San Francisco, and married her in 1983. In 1989, Reynolds moved with his family from Hollywood to Petaluma, California, about which Reynolds said "none of my neighbors have written a screenplay." Their son, Cooper, was born in 1991, and Jack was born in 1993. They divorced in 2000.

== Comedic shows ==
- "Only the Truth Is Funny" (1991)
- "All Grown Up ... And No Place to Go" (1995)
- "Love, God, Sex (and Other Stuff I Don't Have)" (2009)
- "Only the Truth Is Funny: Mid-Life at the Oasis" (2009)
