= Lee Aronsohn =

American screenwriter, director, composer and TV producer (born 1952)

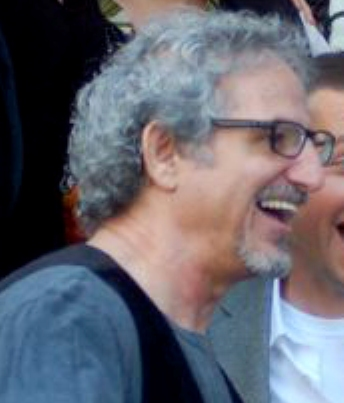
- Aronsohn in September 2011
- Born: December 15, 1952 (age 73); United States
- Occupations: Television writer, television producer, composer, screenwriter, film director

Lee Aronsohn (born December 15, 1952) is an American television writer, composer and producer.

He is the co-creator of the successful TV series Two and a Half Men. He has written for many sitcoms, such as The Love Boat, Who's the Boss?, Murphy Brown, Grace Under Fire, The Big Bang Theory, and Cybill.

== Career ==
In 1975, he founded the comic bookstore "Trade-a-Tape Comic Center" in Lincoln, Nebraska, which he ran for two years. As of May 2026, the store is still in operation, under its third owner.

In 1997, he co-created the sitcom starring Rick Reynolds and Pam Dawber, Life... and Stuff.

In 2003, he co-created the sitcom Two and a Half Men and wrote the original music for the series as well. Besides writing scripts, Aronsohn has also worked as executive producer and directed one show per season. He was also executive producer and writer for The Big Bang Theory.

In 2018, he released his first feature-length documentary, 40 Years in the Making: The Magic Music Movie, about his efforts to reunite his favorite band from his college years, Magic Music. The movie enjoys a limited theatrical release starting August 3 and was released digitally September 4, 2018.

== Selected credits ==
Title	Year	Credited as				Network
Title	Year	Creator	Director	Writer	Executive Producer	Network
Two and a Half Men	2003–2015	Yes	Yes	Yes	Yes	CBS
The Big Bang Theory	2007–2019	No	No	Yes	Yes	CBS
