= James Widdoes =

American actor and television director

- Born: James Landauer Widdoes; November 15, 1953 (age 72); Pittsburgh, Pennsylvania
- Spouse: Margaret Brooks Hendrie (m. 1979; died 2018)
- Children: 3

James Landauer Widdoes (born November 15, 1953), sometimes billed as Jamie Widdoes, is an American actor and television director.

== Early life ==
Widdoes was born in Pittsburgh, Pennsylvania. He was the son of Barbara (Landauer) and W. Peirce Widdoes. His maternal great-grandmother was ephemera and sheet music collector Bella Clara Landauer. He graduated from The Loomis Chaffee School in Windsor, Connecticut, in 1972, and serves on its board of trustees. Widdoes began his acting career during college, starring in a production of The New Amen Show at the Diners Playhouse in Lexington, Kentucky, in 1974. He attended Skidmore College in 1972 and then transferred to New York University's Tisch School of Arts, graduating in 1976 with a Bachelor of Fine Arts degree. While in New York, he roomed with actors as Michael O'Keefe and The Great Santini. He then began performing in productions such as the 1977 Equity Library Theatre revival of Wonderful Town and the 1982 Broadway musical Is there life after high school? His role in this last production won him a Theatre World Award.

== Career ==
Widdoes starred as senior student and fraternity president Robert Hoover alongside John Belushi in the 1978 film National Lampoon's Animal House as well as the 1979 TV series spin-off Delta House. He guest-starred in TV series, including Remington Steele, Night Court, Dave's World, The Goldbergs and My Wife and Kids. Widdoes starred as the patriarch of the Pembroke family, Stan, in the 1984-1985 seasons of Charles in Charge. He was a frequent panelist on game shows, including The Match Game-Hollywood Squares Hour and Super Password.

Beginning in 1998, Widdoes produced and/or directed episodes for television series, including Just the Ten of Us, Empty Nest, Anything But Love, Harry and the Hendersons, Boston Common, Brother's Keeper, Reba, 8 Simple Rules (For Dating My Teenage Daughter), The King of Queens, 'Til Death, Mom, The Bill Engvall Show, Broke, and Extended Family. He directed several episodes of Two and a Half Men during the show's first six seasons, and began directing the series regularly beginning with season seven. Widdoes directed all but two episodes of the series' final six seasons. From April 2015 to May 2021, he directed 122 of the 170 episodes of Mom.
