= Eddie Gorodetsky =

Television writer and producer

- Occupations: Television writer, television producer
- Notable work: Two and a Half Men; The Big Bang Theory; Dharma & Greg; The Fresh Prince of Bel-Air; Saturday Night Live; SCTV Network 90; Late Night with David Letterman; Mom
- Awards: Primetime Emmy Award (1 win; 6 nominations)

Eddie Gorodetsky is an American television writer and producer. His credits include Desert Bus, Two and a Half Men, Dharma & Greg, The Fresh Prince of Bel Air, The Big Bang Theory, Saturday Night Live, SCTV Network 90, and Late Night with David Letterman. He has been nominated for six Emmy Awards, winning one.

He was working at WBCN in Boston when he was discovered by the producers of Second City Television.

He has made Christmas compilations for over 20 years which he sends to friends and family which feature rare and obscure songs from a variety of genres. He released one commercially in the early 1990s: Christmas Party with Eddie G.

He also produced Bob Dylan's weekly radio series, Theme Time Radio Hour, and appeared in Paul Provenza and Penn Jillette's documentary The Aristocrats. Gorodetsky's association with Dylan also led to Dylan making a rare television appearance on the 1999 episode of Dharma And Greg entitled "Play Lady Play." In 2001 Gorodetsky appeared in a Kinka Usher-directed commercial for Dylan's album "Love and Theft" featuring Dylan playing poker with magician Ricky Jay. Gorodetsky co-created Mom, a TV series on CBS that premiered in 2013.

== Screenwriting ==
=== Television ===
- SCTV Network (1982)
- Late Night with David Letterman (1984–1985)
- Saturday Night Live (1986–1987)
- ALF Tales (1988)
- Vinnie & Bobby (1992)
- Batman: The Animated Series (1992)
- The Fresh Prince of Bel-Air (1993–1995)
- Brotherly Love (1997)
- Dharma & Greg (1999–2002)
- According to Jim (2002)
- Two and a Half Men (2003–2013)
- The Big Bang Theory (2011)
- Mom (2013–2021)
- Bob Hearts Abishola (2019–2024)
- Georgie & Mandy's First Marriage

=== Film ===
- Penn & Teller’s Cruel Tricks for Dear Friends (1987)
- Glass Onion: A Knives Out Mystery (2022)

== In popular culture ==
Dave Thomas of SCTV based Ennio Gorodetsky, the bizarre host of a reality show called Revenge!, on Gorodetsky.
