= Two and a Half Men season 7 =

Two and a Half Men
- Season 7
- DVD cover art
- Showrunner: Lee Aronsohn
- Starring: Charlie Sheen; Jon Cryer; Angus T. Jones; Marin Hinkle; Conchata Ferrell; Jennifer Taylor; Holland Taylor
- No. of episodes: 22

Release
- Original network: CBS
- Original release: September 21, 2009 – May 24, 2010

Season chronology
- ← Previous; Season 6 Next → Season 8

The seventh season of the American television sitcom Two and a Half Men aired on CBS from September 21, 2009 to May 24, 2010.

== Cast ==
=== Main ===
- Charlie Sheen as Charlie Harper
- Jon Cryer as Alan Harper
- Angus T. Jones as Jake Harper
- Marin Hinkle as Judith Harper-Melnick
- Conchata Ferrell as Berta
- Jennifer Taylor as Chelsea (Note: Prior to appearing as the main character Chelsea from season 6 onwards, Jennifer Taylor had appeared briefly in three previous episodes as three different minor characters: as Suzanne in the series' pilot (season 1), as Tina in "Last Chance to See Those Tattoos" (season 2), and as Nina in "Our Leather Gear Is in the Guest Room" (season 5).)
- Holland Taylor as Evelyn Harper

=== Recurring ===
- Ryan Stiles as Herb Melnick
- Kelly Stables as Melissa
- Courtney Thorne-Smith as Lyndsey McElroy
- Graham Patrick Martin as Eldridge McElroy

=== Guest ===
- Jane Lynch as Dr. Linda Freeman
- Emmanuelle Vaugier as Mia
- Melanie Lynskey as Rose
- Eddie Van Halen as himself
- Will Sasso as Andrew
- Tinashe Kachingwe as Celeste Burnett
- Annie Potts as Lenore
- Steve Hytner as Dr. Schenkman
- Katy Mixon as Betsy
- Tricia Helfer as Gail
- Carl Reiner as Marty Pepper
- Stacy Keach as Tom
- Meagen Fay as Martha
- Steven Eckholdt as Brad Harlow
- John Amos as Ed
- Frances Fisher as Priscilla Honeycutt
- Amy Hill as Mrs. Wiggins
- Elizabeth Ho as Jasmine
- Martin Mull as Russell
- Katherine LaNasa as Lydia
- Ming-Na Wen as Linda
- Rachel Cannon as Chloe
- Justine Eyre as Gabrielle
- Jodi Lyn O'Keefe as Isabella
- Missi Pyle as Mrs. Pasternak
- Rena Sofer as Chrissy
- Billy Gibbons as himself
- Dusty Hill as himself
- Frank Beard as himself

== Production ==
The season was originally intended to have 22 episodes, but in November 2009 it was announced that the season was being extended to 24 episodes. Sheen entered rehab on February 23, 2010, and as a result, taping of the show was suspended; Sheen and the cast returned to the set to resume taping on March 16, 2010. However, as a result of the three-week halt, the number of episodes was reduced back to 22.

== Episodes ==
No. overall	No. in season	Title	Directed by	Written by	Original release date	Prod. code	U.S. viewers (millions)
140	1	"818-jklpuzo"	James Widdoes	Story by : Chuck Lorre & Lee Aronsohn & Mark Roberts; Teleplay by : Eddie Gorodetsky & Don Foster & Susan Beavers	September 21, 2009	3X5501	13.63
Charlie bumps into Mia at the coffee shop and she asks him to help her out with some music she has been working on. Charlie initially declines, but Chelsea says that if he has no feelings for Mia, he should have no problem helping her out. Concerned about what Chelsea said, Charlie visits Dr. Freeman, who says he must pick the woman he loves most. While working together, Mia makes a move on Charlie - who then tells her he loves Chelsea and leaves Mia for good. Meanwhile, Alan and Melissa officially reunite, and Charlie gets concerned wondering if Melissa has moved in. Eddie Van Halen has a cameo appearance. Title quotation from: Alan, testing Charlie's memory trick to remember Chelsea's phone number.
141	2	"Whipped Unto the Third Generation"	James Widdoes	Mark Roberts	September 28, 2009	3X5502	13.86
When Chelsea convinces Charlie to let Melissa, Alan's girlfriend, move in, the girls take over the house. Charlie angrily leaves the house to stay at a hotel after Alan and Melissa throw a party without asking him; Alan then gets himself kicked out by trying to stand up to Melissa and Chelsea. Alan and Charlie get Evelyn to tell Chelsea that Charlie had previously slept with Melissa, causing the two girls to have a falling out thus giving Charlie and Alan the house back. Title quotation from: Charlie, bemoaning that women will be controlling them for a long time after watching Celeste (Tinashe) control Jake.
142	3	"Mmm, Fish. Yum."	James Widdoes	Story by : Chuck Lorre & Lee Aronsohn & Don Foster; Teleplay by : Eddie Gorodetsky & Susan Beavers & Jim Patterson	October 5, 2009	3X5503	13.30
Alan plays nursemaid to Judith's baby and her tipsy mother Lenore (Annie Potts) while Judith and Herb try to take a "romantic" getaway. Meanwhile, Charlie runs over a cat which he believes to be Chelsea's cat, Sir Lancelot, and Jake takes a photo of the scene to blackmail Charlie into letting him drive his Mercedes. The two later find out that Chelsea's cat was with her the whole time and is therefore alive and well, much to the relief of Charlie, but suddenly a large muscular man comes looking for his cat - the same one Charlie ran over, much to Jake's delight as he can now blackmail Charlie again. Title quotation from: Alan, upon seeing a fish meal on the table.
143	4	"Laxative Tester, Horse Inseminator"	James Widdoes	Story by : Susan Beavers & Eddie Gorodetsky; Teleplay by : Chuck Lorre & Lee Aronsohn & Mark Roberts	October 12, 2009	3X5504	14.17
Sick of not having a place of his own to have sex with Melissa after a failed attempt at having sex with her in his Volvo, Alan takes a job working for Evelyn. He invites Melissa over to a house he and Evelyn are selling and tells Melissa that he is renting it. This backfires when Evelyn walks in on them, causing Melissa to leave and Alan to flee in his underwear, which leads to his arrest. Meanwhile, Charlie is fed up with Jake's bad attitude toward Chelsea and forces them to work out their issues alone in hopes that they will bond, but it turns out that it is Charlie's fault that they are not getting along. Title quotation from: Charlie, to Alan, naming other jobs Alan could have taken instead of working for Evelyn.
144	5	"For the Sake of the Child"	James Widdoes	Story by : Chuck Lorre & Lee Aronsohn & Mark Roberts; Teleplay by : Don Foster & Jim Patterson	October 19, 2009	3X5506	14.07
While Jake has been learning to drive, Charlie and Alan have been bickering nonstop. When this embarrasses Jake in front of a group of girls he likes, he refuses to stay with them anymore, and they have to find a way to convince him to continue spending weekends at the beach house. After their attempt fails, Judith snaps and shouts at Jake until he goes with them. In an attempt to resolve his antagonism with Charlie, Alan brings out an old relationship-counselling book he used with Judith, but he and Charlie use it when they are getting plastered. Absent: Jennifer Taylor as Chelsea. Her absence is explained as a visit to her father who has had a hip operation. Title quotation from: Alan, wanting himself and Charlie to put aside their differences so that Jake will want to stay with them on weekends.
145	6	"Give Me Your Thumb"	James Widdoes	Story by : Chuck Lorre & Mark Roberts; Teleplay by : David Richardson	November 2, 2009	3X5505	13.51
Chelsea has been dealing with back pain, and Alan suggests she alleviate the pain with breast reduction surgery. Charlie learns of this and angrily kicks Alan out, offering him the cash to pay for a stay in a hotel. Alan decides to keep the cash and temporarily stay with Evelyn. Meanwhile, Charlie doesn't want Chelsea to go through with the surgery, having taken a big liking to her large breasts, but Chelsea goes ahead and arranges for the surgery. As he tries to come to terms with it, he makes a remark about Chelsea's body that puts her off the idea of surgery. Meanwhile, Evelyn scares Alan away by pampering him by buying him expensive clothes, and asking him to return the favor by caring for her when she becomes old and crippled. Title quotation from: Evelyn, to Alan, while taking his thumbprint to falsify documents.
146	7	"Untainted by Filth"	James Widdoes	Story by : Chuck Lorre & Lee Aronsohn & Don Foster; Teleplay by : Eddie Gorodetsky & Susan Beavers & Jim Patterson	November 9, 2009	3X5507	14.44
Evelyn announces that she will take care of Charlie and Chelsea's wedding as a gift, and they finally have a set date: June 26 at the Bel-Air Hotel. Later that night, Charlie and Alan go out drinking and meet a woman (Katy Mixon), and they later wake up all in the same bed, but they can't remember what happened; Charlie doesn't know whether or not to tell Chelsea, until Evelyn's advice settles his conscience, but Chelsea is suspicious. Jake and Chelsea have a conversation about Charlie's past flings, which makes Chelsea extremely uncomfortable. Title quotation from: Charlie, describing that white roses symbolize clean love.
147	8	"Gorp. Fnark. Schmegle."	James Widdoes	Story by : Chuck Lorre & Lee Aronsohn & Mark Roberts; Teleplay by : Don Foster & Eddie Gorodetsky & Susan Beavers & Jim Patterson	November 16, 2009	3X5508	13.69
Chelsea invites her beautiful college roommate, Gail (Tricia Helfer), to stay at the house while Gail gets over a bad breakup with her boyfriend, Brian. Charlie is struggling to resist his temptations toward Gail and wonders if Chelsea, who has a problem with him not listening to her, is testing him to see if he is going to hit on Gail. Meanwhile, Berta suggests he use Alan's romantic ineptitude towards Gail to solve the problem which proves effective and successful. Title quotation from: Alan, in thought-speak, when first seeing Gail. Also said by Charlie in a dream he has about Chelsea and Gail.
148	9	"Captain Terry's Spray-On Hair"	James Widdoes	Story by : Don Foster & Eddie Gorodetsky & Susan Beavers & Jim Patterson; Teleplay by : Chuck Lorre & Lee Aronsohn & Mark Roberts	November 23, 2009	3X5509	13.88
Charlie is upset when he finds out he hasn't been sexually satisfying Chelsea, and contemplates the reasons and tries to solve the problem. It is later revealed that Chelsea has found out that her ex-husband is getting remarried which has somehow negatively affected her sex life. Meanwhile, Alan tries to fix his oncoming baldness with a cheap hair product, called Captain Terry's Spray-On Hair and pills that he bought online, which proves to be a disaster. Title quotation from: Charlie, reading out the label of Alan's new hair product.
149	10	"That's Why They Call It Ball Room"	James Widdoes	Story by : Chuck Lorre & Jim Patterson; Teleplay by : Lee Aronsohn & Mark Roberts & Don Foster & Eddie Gorodetsky	December 7, 2009	3X5510	14.84
Charlie and Chelsea get into an argument about dancing at the wedding, and the two end up going to dance lessons together, where Charlie finds out Chelsea has been keeping secrets about her finances: she owns multiple properties that she had never mentioned before, making her richer than Charlie, which angers Charlie as she hasn't paid any bills in the house while they have been living together. Eventually, she apologizes and they make up. Alan and Jake watch Alan's old wedding video. Title quotation from: Charlie, to Alan, while dancing - after Alan explains there should be no groin contact.
150	11	"Warning, It's Dirty"	James Widdoes	Story by : Chuck Lorre & Mark Roberts; Teleplay by : Lee Aronsohn & Eddie Gorodetsky & Don Foster	December 14, 2009	3X5511	16.37
With Celeste (Tinashe), Jake's girlfriend, away for Christmas, Charlie tells Jake that it's okay to cheat on her with a girl he meets on the beach, but this backfires when Celeste returns unexpectedly as Jake arrives with the girl, which also lands Charlie in hot water with Chelsea. Meanwhile, Evelyn brings ailing TV personality Marty Pepper (Carl Reiner) to Charlie's Christmas gathering, because she hopes to handle the sale of his $60-million mansion when he dies. At the dinner table, everyone trash-talks Charlie after the cheating incident. Title quotation from: Marty Pepper, about how he knows Lucille Ball isn't a natural redhead.
151	12	"Fart Jokes, Pie and Celeste"	James Widdoes	Story by : Chuck Lorre & Lee Aronsohn & Mark Roberts & Don Foster; Teleplay by : Susan Beavers & Eddie Gorodetsky & Jim Patterson & David Richardson	January 11, 2010	3X5512	17.27
Jake is still angry with Charlie about the incident with Celeste, and he decides to sing her the love song he has written in an attempt to win her back. Charlie suggests that instead he try apologizing in person, but when that fails he says Jake will soon find another girl, and although he is doubtful he soon does. Meanwhile, Alan and Herb begin to bond after going out to eat together, but Judith will not let them spend any more time together. Notes: In the season 7 DVD gag reel, a deleted scene is shown with Alan heading into the house and Jake preparing to go to Celeste's house with his acoustic guitar strapped on and wearing shorts and a T-shirt; the scene ends with Angus T. Jones bursting into laughter. This is Tinashe's last appearance on Two and a Half Men. Title quotation from: Jake, naming what he loves. Charlie names the first two before Jake names all three.
152	13	"Yay, No Polyps!"	James Widdoes	Story by : Chuck Lorre & Lee Aronsohn; Teleplay by : Mark Roberts & Don Foster & Jim Patterson	January 18, 2010	3X5513	16.31
Charlie schedules a colonoscopy to get out of visiting Chelsea's parents, Tom and Martha, in Illinois, but Chelsea figures out he was lying and flies them into Los Angeles instead. During a night drinking with Chelsea's father (Stacy Keach), Charlie and Alan learn that he is a closet homosexual and is secretly in love with an African-American war-buddy of his, which is also in contrast with Martha's beliefs since she is an extremist and racist homophobe. Chelsea then overhears her mother and father arguing about the situation; the two then break up. Title quotation from: Alan, about the results of Charlie's colonoscopy.
153	14	"Crude and Uncalled For"	James Widdoes	Story by : Chuck Lorre & Lee Aronsohn; Teleplay by : Mark Roberts & Don Foster & Eddie Gorodetsky	February 1, 2010	3X5514	16.51
Alan ends up in jail after a bar fight and Charlie worries that Chelsea might be interested in Alan's lawyer, Brad Harlow (Steven Eckholdt), who takes the case, because he claims to be a family man, and horse range charity-founder. Brad invites Chelsea and Charlie to his charity event, but Charlie decides not to go, leaving him to wonder if Chelsea is actually cheating on him with Brad. Title quotation from: Evelyn, to Charlie, after he makes a remark about the possibility of an upcoming court case.
154	15	"Aye, Aye, Captain Douche"	James Widdoes	Story by : Chuck Lorre & Lee Aronsohn & Susan Beavers; Teleplay by : Mark Roberts & Don Foster & Jim Patterson	February 8, 2010	3X5515	17.66
Charlie becomes worried and jealous after Chelsea is late returning from a charity event with Brad. When Chelsea does return, she and Charlie argue and Chelsea leaves, and Charlie drowns his sorrows repeatedly. Chelsea later asks Charlie to meet her for coffee; during this meeting, Charlie throws up on a woman's baby, causing Chelsea to postpone the wedding and break up with Charlie. Evelyn comforts Charlie, but adds that most people throw up on their own babies, rather than other peoples. Title quotation from: Jake, who is being sarcastic after Charlie tells him to turn down the TV volume.
155	16	"Tinkle Like a Princess"	James Widdoes	Story by : Chuck Lorre & Lee Aronsohn; Teleplay by : Mark Roberts & Don Foster & Jim Patterson	March 1, 2010	3X5516	16.86
After Chelsea breaks up with him, a depressed Charlie takes a trip to Las Vegas and returns home with a new wife, Betsy. Charlie then finds out that his new "wife" is already married, and her husband says that she regularly has affairs, which he tolerates because he'd rather share her than not have her at all. Charlie then spends some time with Chelsea's father, Tom, and his new boyfriend, Ed. John Amos guest stars as Ed. Katy Mixon guest stars as Betsy, who could be the same character (also played by Mixon) who appears in "Untainted by Filth", but neither Charlie nor Alan recognize her! Title quotation from: Charlie, explaining to Alan that he can't go into his bathroom as it reminds him of Chelsea.
156	17	"I Found Your Moustache"	James Widdoes	Story by : Chuck Lorre & Lee Aronsohn & Mark Roberts; Teleplay by : Don Foster & Eddie Gorodetsky & Jim Patterson	March 8, 2010	3X5517	17.61
Chelsea has started dating Brad. Charlie stalks her with the help of Alan, and after having a post-breakup one-night stand, the two are left re-thinking about if it was right for them to break up. Charlie tries to win her back, and takes relationship advice from her father and his boyfriend; Charlie tells Alan he likes having him live at the house which brings Alan to tears of happiness. Title quotation from: Chelsea, to Charlie, handing him the fake moustache that Alan loaned him.
157	18	"Ixnay on the Oggie Day"	James Widdoes	Story by : Don Foster & Eddie Gorodetsky & Jim Patterson; Teleplay by : Chuck Lorre & Lee Aronsohn & Mark Roberts	March 22, 2010	3X5518	14.46
Charlie runs into Chelsea's friend Gail (Tricia Helfer) at the Pizza shoppe for Jake's new haircut, which he got because of his new girlfriend. He has sex with her, but then learns that Chelsea is having problems with Brad. Charlie later meets Chelsea for coffee and tells her that he slept with Gail, causing Chelsea to angrily storm off. She later comes round his house to apologize but again storms off after thinking that Gail is still there in Charlie's bedroom. Meanwhile, Alan finds himself able to pleasure a female patient just by giving her a back massage but worries he's becoming a sort of gigolo due to the large amounts of cash that the woman is paying him. Title quotation from: Charlie, telling Gail that they should keep the fact that they had sex between themselves.
158	19	"Keith Moon is Vomiting in His Grave"	James Widdoes	Story by : Mark Roberts & Don Foster; Teleplay by : Eddie Gorodetsky & Jim Patterson	April 12, 2010	3X5519	13.71
Jake's new friend, Eldridge (Graham Patrick Martin), proves to be a bad influence when he talks Jake into stealing beer from Charlie, getting drunk and sneaking out when grounded. Charlie catches Jake sneaking out, but lets him off the hook after Jake and his friends felicitate Charlie on the current jingle he'd written. Alan plans to have words with Eldridge's mother, Lyndsey (Courtney Thorne-Smith), but ends up falling for her and the two later make the most of a trip to a bar. Absent: Jennifer Taylor as Chelsea. First appearance of: Lyndsey MacElroy, Eldridge MacElroy Title quotation from: Charlie, comparing Eldridge to other drummers as he vomits in a wicker basket. Keith Moon was the drummer from The Who.
159	20	"I Called Him Magoo"	James Widdoes	Story by : Chuck Lorre & Lee Aronsohn; Teleplay by : Mark Roberts & Don Foster & Susan Beavers	May 10, 2010	3X5520	13.86
After being interrupted at Lyndsey's house by her son, Eldridge, Alan tries for an intimate night at a hotel with her, but nothing goes as planned due to the fact Lyndsey suffers a bad period, and Alan gets an upset stomach. Meanwhile, Charlie tries to get the "girlfriend experience" from a prostitute, Jasmine (Elizabeth Ho), by having her and himself act as a real couple with real problems. The prostitute actually takes a liking to the role. Absent: Jennifer Taylor as Chelsea. Title quotation from: Berta, talking about a blind, mentally deteriorating cat she used to own that Alan reminds her of.
160	21	"Gumby with a Pokey"	James Widdoes	Story by : Chuck Lorre & Lee Aronsohn & Susan Beavers & David Richardson; Teleplay by : Mark Roberts & Don Foster & Eddie Gorodetsky & Jim Patterson	May 17, 2010	3X5521	13.28
Charlie finds himself with insomnia, and is given prescription marijuana by his pharmacist (Martin Mull) to help him sleep. After smoking it with Berta, Charlie has disturbing visions of women from his past. Alan and Jake have a road trip to Sacramento to pick up a valuable antique grandfather clock left to Alan by Judith's recently deceased grandfather. While riding home in the car, the clock falls out the back of Alan's station wagon and smashes into pieces, making his and Jake's trip futile. ZZ Top guest star as themselves. Title quotation from: Russell, Charlie's pharmacist, describing the effects of Viagra taken with a muscle relaxant.
161	22	"This is Not Gonna End Well"	Lee Aronsohn	Story by : Chuck Lorre & Lee Aronsohn & Mark Roberts & Don Foster; Teleplay by : Eddie Gorodetsky & Susan Beavers & Jim Patterson & David Richardson	May 24, 2010	3X5522	15.46
Jake is driving Charlie around when he runs a red light at Charlie's urging, and is pulled over by police, causing Jake to panic. He and Charlie switch seats so that it appears Charlie was driving, and as a result, Charlie loses his license due to several unpaid traffic violations and failure to show up in court, forcing him to rely on Jake to drive him around. Alan goes to Chelsea's birthday party, and Charlie sends Jake in too so that he can give her a forgotten gift. After being given the gift Chelsea leaves in an emotional fit, only to find Charlie being arrested for crashing into a police cruiser. Title quotation from: Charlie, after crashing into a police car while driving drunk and with a suspended license.

== Ratings ==
=== U.S. Nielsen ratings ===
Order	Episode	Rating	Share	Rating/Share (18-49)	Viewers (millions)	Rank (timeslot)	Rank (night)
1	"818-jklpuzo"	8.5	12	4.5/10	13.63	#1	#1
2	"Whipped Unto the Third Generation"	8.3	12	4.8/12	13.86	#1	#1
3	"Mmm, fish. Yum."	8.3	12	4.4/10	13.30	#1	#1
4	"Laxative Tester, Horse Inseminator"	8.7	13	4.8/11	14.17	#1	#1
5	"For the Sake of the Child"	8.6	13	4.8/12	14.07	#1	#1
6	"Give Me Your Thumb"	8.4	12	4.4/11	13.51	#2	#1
7	"Untainted by Filth"	8.9	13	4.6/11	14.44	#2	#3
8	"Gorp. Fnark. Schmegle"	8.4	13	4.7/12	13.69	#1	#2
9	"Captain Terry's Spray-on Hair"	8.3	12	4.7/12	13.88	#1	#2
10	"That's Why They Call It Ball Room"	8.8	13	5.0/12	14.84	#1	#2
11	"Warning, It's Dirty"	9.8	15	5.2/13	16.37	#1	#1
12	"Fart Jokes, Pie and Celeste"	10.1	15	5.4/13	17.27	#1	#2
13	"Yay, No Polyps!"	9.5	14	5.3/12	16.20	#1	#1
14	"Crude and Uncalled For"	9.9	15	5.1/12	16.51	#1	#2
15	"Aye Aye, Captain Douche"	10.5	15	5.7/14	17.66	#1	#2
16	"Tinkle Like a Princess"	10.1	15	5.7/14	16.86	#1	#2
17	"I Found Your Moustache"	10.5	16	5.8/15	17.61	#1	#1
18	"Ixnay on the Oggie Day"	8.6	13	5.1/13	14.46	#3	#2
19	"Keith Moon is Vomiting in His Grave"	8.3	13	4.7/13	13.71	#2	#3
20	"I Called Him Magoo"	8.5	13	4.6/12	13.86	#2	#3
21	"Gumby with a Pokey"	8.1	13	4.4/12	13.28	#2	#3
22	"This is Not Gonna End Well"	9.4	15	5.0/13	15.46	#1	#2

=== Canadian ratings ===
Order	Episode	Viewers (100'000s)	Rank
3	"Mmm, fish. Yum."	12.14	#29
9	"Captain Terry's Spray-On Hair"	11.34	#26
10	"That's Why They Call it Ball Room"	10.08	#29
11	"Warning, It's Dirty"	10.97	#17
12	"Fart Jokes, Pie and Celeste"	22.81	#5
13	"Yay, No Polyps!"	20.29	#10
14	"Crude and Uncalled For"	18.89	#13
15	"Aye Aye, Captain"	19.73	#17
16	"Tinkle Like a Princess"	23.69	#7
17	"I Found Your Moustache"	21.54	#12
18	"Ixnay on the Oggie Day"	19.54	#7
19	"Keith Moon is Vomiting in His Grave"	22.29	#6
20	"I Called Him Magoo"	19.87	#12
21	"Gumby With a Pokey"	22.65	#6
22	"This is Not Gonna End Well"	23.60	#6

=== Australian ratings ===
Order	Episode	Original airdate	Timeslot	Viewers (100'000s)	Nightly rank	Weekly rank
1	"818-Jklpuzo"	September 28, 2009	Monday 8:00 pm–8:30 pm	13.27	6	16
2	"Whipped Unto the Third Generation"	October 19, 2009	Monday 7:30 pm–8:00 pm	14.36	1	3
3	"Mmm, fish. Yum."	October 26, 2009	Monday 7:30 pm–8:00 pm	14.38	2	6
4	"Laxative Tester, Horse Inseminator"	November 2, 2009	Monday 7:30 pm–8:00 pm	13.69	2	8
5	"For the Sake of the Child"	November 9, 2009	Monday 7:30 pm–8:00 pm	14.55	1	4
6	"Give Me Your Thumb"	November 16, 2009	Monday 7:30 pm–8:00 pm	14.62	1	3
7	"Untainted by Filth"	November 23, 2009	Monday 7:30 pm–8:00 pm	12.76	4	10
8	"Gorp. Fnark. Shmegle"	February 1, 2010	Monday 7:30 pm–8:00 pm	15.19	1	3
9	"Captain Terry's Spray-On Hair"	February 8, 2010	Monday 7:30 pm–8:00 pm	14.20	1	2
10	"That's Why They Call it Ball Room"	February 15, 2010	Monday 7:30 pm–8:00 pm	13.26	3	8
11	"Warning, It's Dirty"	February 22, 2010	Monday 7:30 pm–8:00 pm	13.97	1	1
12	"Fart Jokes, Pie and Celeste"	March 1, 2010	Monday 7:30 pm–8:00 pm	14.24	2	1
