= Two and a Half Men =

American television sitcom (2003–2015)

- Genre: Sitcom
- Created by: Chuck Lorre; Lee Aronsohn
- Showrunners: Chuck Lorre; Lee Aronsohn; Don Reo; Jim Patterson
- Starring: Charlie Sheen; Jon Cryer; Angus T. Jones; Marin Hinkle; Melanie Lynskey; Holland Taylor; Conchata Ferrell; April Bowlby; Jennifer Taylor; Ashton Kutcher; Amber Tamblyn; Edan Alexander
- Theme music composer: Chuck Lorre; Lee Aronsohn; Grant Geissman
- Opening theme: "Manly Men"
- Composers: Dennis C. Brown; Grant Geissman
- Country of origin: United States
- Original language: English
- No. of seasons: 12
- No. of episodes: 262 (list of episodes)

Production
- Executive producers: Chuck Lorre; Lee Aronsohn; Eric Tannenbaum; Kim Tannenbaum; Andy Ackerman; Mark Burg; Oren Koules; Don Foster; Eddie Gorodetsky; Susan Beavers; Mark Roberts; Jim Patterson; Don Reo; Michael Collier
- Cinematography: Tony Askins (pilot); Steven V. Silver; Mark Davison
- Editors: Peter Chakos (pilot); Joe Bella
- Camera setup: Film; multi-camera
- Running time: 21 minutes
- Production companies: Chuck Lorre Productions; The Tannenbaum Company; Warner Bros. Television

Original release
- Network: CBS
- Release: September 22, 2003 – February 19, 2015

Two and a Half Men is an American television sitcom, created by Chuck Lorre and Lee Aronsohn, that aired for 12 seasons on CBS from September 22, 2003, to February 19, 2015. The series originally starred Charlie Sheen as Charlie Harper, a hedonistic jingle writer, alongside Jon Cryer as his uptight brother Alan, and Angus T. Jones as Alan's son Jake. Supporting roles were played by Holland Taylor, Marin Hinkle, Conchata Ferrell, and Melanie Lynskey.

In February 2011, CBS halted production for the rest of the eighth season after Sheen entered drug rehabilitation and made disparaging comments about Lorre. Sheen's contract was terminated the following month. Ashton Kutcher was then hired for the ninth season onward to star as Walden Schmidt, a billionaire who buys Charlie's house after Charlie's death.

Angus T. Jones reduced his role starting in the 10th season, citing a religious awakening and dissatisfaction with the show's content. He later left the show, appearing only briefly in the series finale.

During the show's run, the recurring cast expanded to include April Bowlby as Kandi, Alan’s second wife, in the third season, with recurring appearances in later seasons; Jennifer Taylor as Chelsea, Charlie’s longtime girlfriend, in the sixth and seventh seasons; Amber Tamblyn as Jenny, Charlie's long-lost daughter, in the 11th season and Edan Alexander joined the cast as Louis, a foster child, introduced in the 12th and final season.

In 2012, the show became the third-highest revenue-generating program, earning $3.24 million per episode. Ratings peaked during Sheen's tenure, saw a boost during Kutcher's first season, but gradually declined afterward, leading to the series' cancellation after the 12th season.

== Overview ==
The series revolved initially around the lives of the Harper brothers, Charlie (Charlie Sheen) and Alan (Jon Cryer), and Alan's son Jake (Angus T. Jones). Charlie is a bachelor who writes commercial jingles for a living, while leading a hedonistic lifestyle. When Alan's wife, Judith (Marin Hinkle), decides to divorce him, he moves into Charlie's Malibu beach house, with Jake coming to stay over the weekends. Charlie's housekeeper is Berta (Conchata Ferrell), a sardonic woman who initially resents the change to the household, but eventually accepts it. Charlie's one-night stand Rose (Melanie Lynskey) was first introduced as his stalker in the pilot episode.

The first five seasons find Charlie in casual sexual misadventures with numerous women until the sixth season, when he becomes engaged to Chelsea (Jennifer Taylor), but the relationship does not last, as Chelsea breaks off their engagement. Afterwards, Charlie flies to Paris with his stalker Rose in the show's de facto eighth-season finale. However, in the ninth-season premiere, Charlie is said to have died after he was struck by a Paris Metro train. Rose hints that she threw Charlie into the train's path after learning that he had cheated on her.

Alan's attitude and experiences are contrasted with Charlie's. Throughout the series, Alan deals with his son Jake's growing up and the aftermath of his bitter divorce, while having little success with women. His marriage to Kandi (April Bowlby) at the end of the third season was short-lived. In the fourth season, Alan is back at the beach house paying alimony to two women out of his low earnings as a chiropractor. In the seventh season, he begins a relationship with Lyndsey McElroy (Courtney Thorne-Smith), the mother of one of Jake's friends. Their relationship is temporarily suspended when Alan cheats on her and accidentally burns down her house, but the relationship is eventually resumed.

In the ninth-season premiere (after Charlie's death), the beach house is sold to Walden Schmidt (Ashton Kutcher), an Internet billionaire going through a divorce from Bridget (Judy Greer). Alan leaves to live with his mother Evelyn (Holland Taylor) when the house is sold, but later Walden invites both Alan and Jake back to live in the beach house.

At the end of the ninth season, Jake joins the US Army; he appears occasionally during the 10th season, briefly dating Tammy (Jaime Pressly), who is 17 years his senior and has three kids, as well as Tammy's daughter Ashley (Emily Osment). In the season, Walden proposes to his English girlfriend Zoey (Sophie Winkleman), only to be turned down and discover she has another man. He becomes depressed. Meanwhile, Alan gets engaged to his girlfriend Lyndsey, while Judith leaves her second husband Herb Melnick (Ryan Stiles) (to whom she had been married since the fourth season) after he cheats on her with his receptionist (they later reconcile). Alan and Lyndsey's relationship of three years ends as she wants to move on. Rose returns and briefly dates Walden, later stalking him as she did to Charlie. Walden begins to date a poor but ambitious woman named Kate (Brooke D'Orsay) and changes his name to "Sam Wilson", pretending to be poor to find someone who wants him for him, not for his money. They later break up when he reveals who he really is, though Kate realizes that Walden's money helped her become a successful clothing designer. Jake announces he is being shipped to Japan for at least a year, so Alan and he go on a father-son bonding trip. Other than a cameo in the series finale, this is the last time Jake appears on the show, though verbal references are made to him.

In the 11th season, a young woman arrives at the beach house, announcing that she is Charlie Harper's biological daughter, Jenny (Amber Tamblyn). She moves in with Walden and Alan, and later displays many of Charlie's traits, including a love of women and alcohol. Lyndsey begins dating a man named Larry (D. B. Sweeney). In an attempt to learn more about Larry, Alan takes on the pseudonym "Jeff Strongman". His double life becomes complicated when "Jeff" begins dating Larry's sister, Gretchen (Kimberly Williams-Paisley).

In the 12th season, after a health scare, Walden decides to reprioritize his life by adopting a baby. He realizes that the only way to do this is to be married, but does not know anyone who will marry him. He asks Alan to marry him and pretend that they are a gay couple, thus ensuring success at adopting. Jenny moves out of the house, and moves in with Evelyn, due to Walden and Alan's preparing to adopt. They adopt a child, Louis (Edan Alexander), and subsequently divorce to pursue relationships with women. Alan proposes to Lyndsey a second time and she accepts, while Walden begins a relationship with Louis' social worker, Ms. McMartin (Maggie Lawson). Charlie is revealed to be alive, having been kept prisoner by Rose until escaping, but he dies in an accident before he can reunite with Walden and Alan.

== Production ==
=== Sheen's dismissal and replacement ===
Following a February 2010 announcement that Sheen was entering drug rehabilitation, filming of the show was put on hiatus, but resumed the following month. On April 1, 2010, People reported that after seven seasons, Sheen announced he was considering leaving the show. According to one source, Sheen quit the show after filming the final episode of season seven, purportedly due to his rejection of CBS's offer of $1 million per episode as too low. Sheen eventually stated that he would be back for two more seasons. On May 18, 2010, the New Zealand website Stuff.co.nz reported that a press release issued by Sheen's publicist confirmed that Sheen had signed a new contract for two years at $1.78 million per episode. "To put a fitting end on the two and one-half months of whirlwind speculation, I'm looking forward to returning to my CBS home on Monday nights," Sheen was quoted as saying.

On January 28, 2011, Sheen voluntarily entered a rehabilitation center for the third time in 12 months. According to Warner Bros. Television and CBS, the show was put on hiatus for an indefinite period of time.

The following month, after Sheen's verbal denunciations of Chuck Lorre in a radio interview with Alex Jones and an online interview with TMZ.com, CBS announced that Two and a Half Men would cease production for the rest of its eighth season. This affected an estimated 200 employees, and caused Warner Bros. Television, CBS, Lorre, Sheen and other profit participants an estimated $10 million loss from the unmade eight remaining episodes. Afterward, Sheen was interviewed on ABC's 20/20, NBC's Today and CNN's Piers Morgan Tonight, where he continued to criticize Lorre and CBS. On March 7, CBS and Warner Bros. Television jointly announced that they had terminated Sheen's Two and a Half Men contract, citing "moral turpitude" as a main cause of separation. No further decisions about the show's future were released.

Cast members Marin Hinkle and Holland Taylor expressed sadness at Sheen's departure and personal problems. Jon Cryer did not publicly comment on the matter. In response, Sheen called him "a turncoat, a traitor, [and] a troll" in an E! Online interview, although he later issued a "half-apology" to Cryer for the remarks. Sheen sued Lorre and Warner Bros. Television for $100 million, saying that he had filed the lawsuit on behalf of himself and Two and a Half Men's cast and crew; however, only Sheen was named as a plaintiff in court documents.

In April 2011, Sheen mentioned during a radio interview during his tour's stop in Boston that CBS and he were discussing a possible return to the show. Lorre announced the same month that he had developed an idea for a revival of Two and a Half Men, excluding Sheen, with Cryer in a key role alongside a new character. Hugh Grant was approached to replace Sheen but he declined. On May 13, CBS announced Ashton Kutcher would join the cast. Kutcher stated, "I can't replace Charlie Sheen, but I'm going to work my ass off to entertain the hell out of people!"

On August 2, 2011, the season-nine premiere was reported as beginning with Sheen's character killed off and his ex-girlfriends attending his funeral. Afterward, Charlie's Malibu home would be put up for sale; interested buyers would include celebrities from Lorre's other sitcoms and John Stamos, as well as Kutcher's character, Walden Schmidt, "an Internet billionaire with a broken heart." Reviewers compared the situation to what happened in 1987 to Valerie Harper, who was fired from the sitcom Valerie (later titled Valerie's Family: The Hogans and then The Hogan Family). Her character was killed off-screen, and she was replaced the following season.

Sheen said he would watch his "fake funeral attended by [his] fake ex-girlfriends, from [his] very, very real movie theater, with [his] very real hotties in tow." His response to the season-nine premiere was very positive. He reportedly felt Charlie Harper's funeral was "eerie but fun", and that the introduction of Kutcher's character in a cloud of his own character's ashes was particularly enjoyable.

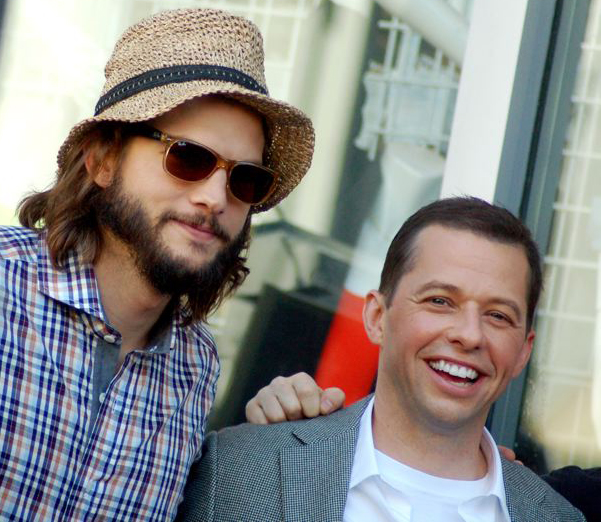
Ashton Kutcher (left) and Jon Cryer

The attention Two and a Half Men received due to the change in characters gave the series a boost. Average total viewers during the 2011–2012 season rose 13% to 15 million and the 5.2 rating in the 18–49 demographic rose by 27%. Kutcher's debut as Walden Schmidt, in the episode "Nice to Meet You, Walden Schmidt", was seen by 28.7 million people on September 19, 2011. The Nielsen company reported it the highest-rated episode since the series began. At the 2012 Emmys, Two and a Half Men was nominated for four awards and won three, the most Emmys it had won in a single year since it began. In 2012, Kutcher replaced Sheen as the highest-paid U.S. actor currently on the air, receiving $700,000 per episode. For Kutcher's second season, the show moved to the 8:30 pm Thursday time slot, replacing Rules of Engagement. Two and a Half Men improved ratings for the time slot, which were up from the previous year. Jennifer Graham Kizer of IVillage thought that the series changed tone in its Kutcher era, saying it felt "less evil". Lorre, Cryer, Hinkle, Taylor, Ferrell and Lynskey had nothing but praise for Kutcher, believing he had "saved the show".

Kutcher was the highest-paid actor on television for four years according to Forbes, earning an estimated $24 million between June 2012 and June 2013, $750,000 per episode. Cryer was the second-highest-paid star on American television, earning $600,000–700,000 per episode.

In 2021, Sheen expressed regret for his past behavior, saying, "There [were] 55 different ways for me to handle that situation and I chose number 56."

=== Jones' departure ===
In a November 2012 interview with a Christian website, Angus T. Jones (Jake) said he had recently converted to Christianity and joined a Seventh-day Adventist church. He attacked the show as "filth that contradicts his moral values" and said that he was "sick of being a part of it". He also begged fans to stop watching the show. Producers explained that Jones was not expected back on the set until 2013, because his character was not scheduled to appear in the final two episodes before the winter hiatus. In response to the controversy, Sheen issued a public statement in which he blamed Chuck Lorre for the outburst and claimed that "Jones' outburst isn't an isolated incident but rather a symptom of the toxic environment surrounding the show." The following day, Jones issued a public apology for his remarks and explained that he "cannot address everything that has been said or right every misstatement or misunderstanding." Jones left the series at the end of the 2012–2013 season and did not appear in season 11 despite initial reports that he would continue in a recurring, rather than a starring, role. The role of youngest family member was filled by Amber Tamblyn, who played Jenny, the long-lost illegitimate daughter of Charlie Harper, and later by Edan Alexander, who played Louis, Walden Schmidt's adopted son. On March 18, 2014, Jones officially announced his departure from the show, stating he had been "a paid hypocrite". Nevertheless, he apologized to Lorre for his actions and appeared in a cameo in the series finale on February 19, 2015.

== Cast and characters ==
The original cast of Two and a Half Men, from left to right: Melanie Lynskey as Rose, Conchata Ferrell as Berta, Charlie Sheen as Charlie Harper, Holland Taylor as Evelyn Harper, Angus T. Jones as Jake Harper, Jon Cryer as Alan Harper, and Marin Hinkle as Judith Harper

=== Main ===
- Charlie Sheen as Charlie Harper (seasons 1–8), a charismatic hedonistic bachelor, jingle/children's songwriter, Alan's elder brother, Jake's paternal uncle and Jenny's father. Despite his arrogant and rambunctious demeanor, he does possess a kind heart, though he very rarely shows it. He is written out of the series at the beginning of season nine, after being pushed in front of a train and killed offscreen, due to Charlie Sheen being fired from the show. In the episode "Why We Gave Up Women", Charlie's ghost, portrayed by Kathy Bates, visits Alan and is forced to spend eternity in hell as a woman with a pair of testicles. He has a daughter named Jenny, whose existence he never disclosed to his family. In season 11, she resurfaces as an adult, but has no idea he had died. The series finale abandons the idea that Charlie is deceased by revealing that Rose faked his death and held him prisoner in a pit for four years. Brainwashed into a violent psychopath, he escapes and portends his imminent arrival by sending threats to Alan, Evelyn and Walden, as well as generous checks to Jake, Berta, Jenny and his ex-girlfriends, but a helicopter drops a grand piano on him and kills him just before he enters the beach house.
- Jon Cryer as Alan Harper, Charlie's younger brother, a struggling chiropractor, Jake's twice-divorced father, Walden's best friend and Jenny's paternal uncle. Alan is intelligent, a graduate of Cal State Long Beach but continually stricken with bad luck due to poor choices and mistakes, which are due to a lifetime of suffering from Charlie's abuse and Evelyn's neglect, as well as favoring Charlie over him. Due to a lack in income (partly the result of Charlie's sabotaging Alan's divorce-settlement by jilting Alan's lawyer in the episode "No Sniffing, No Wowing"), Alan is forced to sponge off people throughout his life, but he genuinely cares about others despite this. His poverty ultimately led to the demise of his business. In the 12th and final season, Alan agrees to "marry" Walden for the latter to adopt a child and for months, the two pretend to be a gay couple. In the series' penultimate episode, Walden and Alan end the marriage as Walden had successfully adopted a six-year-old named Louis. Alan finally proposes to Lyndsey and agrees to marry her (as well as move out) in the final episodes. Cryer is the only cast member who appears in all 262 episodes of the series.
- Angus T. Jones as Jake Harper (seasons 1–10; guest, season 12), the slacker son of Alan and Judith and older half-brother (or brother, if Alan's paternity claim is to be believed) of Milly and paternal cousin of Jenny. In season one, episode 17 ("Ate the Hamburgers, Wearing the Hats"), his real name is revealed to actually be Jacob. As he grows older, he changes from a rather bright (but gullible), independent child into a dimwitted buffoon (who is nevertheless good at blackmailing Charlie and Alan). He eventually enlists in the U.S. Army working as a chef. At the end of season 10, he announces that he is going to Japan for a year. Despite his absence, he is mentioned often in seasons 11 and 12 and makes an uncredited cameo via archive footage in season 12, as well as returning briefly in person in the series finale.
- Ashton Kutcher as Walden Schmidt (seasons 9–12), Alan's best friend, roommate and ephemeral husband. A friendly, hopelessly romantic internet tycoon, he is a billionaire despite being somewhat immature and naïve for most of his life. He purchases the Harper beach house after Charlie's death. During his time in the household, he grows into a responsible adult and forms close friendships with Jake, Herb, Berta, Judith, Evelyn and Jenny. He also serves as a surrogate uncle figure to Jake, in place of Charlie. In season 12, he and Alan adopt a six-year-old boy named Louis.
- Holland Taylor as Evelyn Harper (seasons 1–9; recurring, seasons 10–12), Charlie and Alan's vain mother and the paternal grandmother of Jake and Jenny. A high-powered Los Angeles broker/realtor, she is bisexual.
- Marin Hinkle as Judith Harper-Melnick (seasons 1–9; recurring, seasons 10–12), Alan's selfish, mean-spirited ex-wife and Jake and Milly's mother. She considers Charlie's lifestyle and attitude to be a bad example for Jake and also occasionally has issues with Alan's own parenting practices.
- Conchata Ferrell as Berta (seasons 2–12; recurring, season 1), the family's outspoken housekeeper and close family friend. She shows great animosity towards Alan and Jake, while she adores Charlie and later, Walden. During the Kutcher years, her role was increased on the show, appearing in more episodes. Season 11 was the first season where she appeared in every episode. The role was originally only intended for a two-episode arc in the first season, in which she would leave as a result of Alan and his son moving in.
- Melanie Lynskey as Rose (seasons 1–2; recurring, seasons 3–12), the Harpers' strange neighbor and Charlie's stalker and friend. Initially, Charlie hated Rose and wanted nothing to do with her, but eventually they became friends and he later fell in love with her. In the ninth-season premiere, Rose claimed that Charlie "slipped" in front of a Paris Metro train after she had caught him cheating on her. She was later seen taking Bridget Schmidt under her wing as an apprentice stalker, but this storyline was eventually aborted. After formally meeting Walden at the local tavern, Rose rushed into a relationship with him and caused her ferrets to attack Walden and Alan when Walden broke up with her. Naturally, she continues to stalk Walden, as well as the Harpers, despite Charlie's apparent death. In the finale, she is revealed to have kept Charlie imprisoned in a pit for four years.
- April Bowlby as Kandi (season 4; recurring, season 3; guest, seasons 10 and 12), (Note: Prior to appearing as the main character Kandi in season 4, April Bowlby had appeared briefly as Kimber in the season-three episode "Madame and Her Special Friend".) Charlie's dimwitted girlfriend, then later as Alan's girlfriend and second wife and also Judith's best friend (for one episode). In season 10, after Alan rejects her sexual advances, she has a one-night stand with Alan's girlfriend, Lyndsey McElroy.
- Jennifer Taylor as Chelsea Melini (season 7; recurring, season 6; guest, seasons 9 and 12), (Note: Prior to appearing as the main character Chelsea from season 6 onwards, Taylor had appeared briefly in four previous episodes as three different minor characters: as Suzanne in the series' pilot (season one), as Tina in "Last Chance to See Those Tattoos" (season two) and as Nina in "Our Leather Gear Is in the Guest Room" (season five).) Charlie's voluptuous girlfriend for most of season six, she has moved into his house by the end of the season. She then becomes Charlie's fiancée in season seven. They later end the relationship, which deeply hurt Charlie for a while. She is absent throughout season eight, but makes a brief, speaking cameo at Charlie's funeral in season nine. (While credited on-screen among the main cast during the seventh season, CBS press releases billed her as a recurring character.)
- Amber Tamblyn as Jenny Harper (season 11; recurring, season 12), Charlie's illegitimate daughter who shares many personality traits with her father, including indulging in alcohol and women. She quickly bonds with Alan and Walden, often flaunting her female lovers in front of them. (While credited on-screen among the main cast during the 12th season, CBS press releases bill her as a recurring character.)
- Edan Alexander as Louis Schmidt (season 12), a six-year-old boy whom Walden adopts.

=== Recurring ===
The following appeared in recurring roles or story arcs spanning multiple episodes:

- Courtney Thorne-Smith as Lyndsey McElroy, Alan's on/off love interest from season 7 on and his fiancée in season 12. In season 10, she has a one-night stand with Kandi (Alan's ex-wife) (seasons 7–12)
- Jane Lynch as the sarcastic Dr. Linda Freeman, originally Jake's child psychologist and later Charlie's regular psychiatrist who later also treats Alan and Walden (seasons 1, 3–9, 11)
- Ryan Stiles as Herb Melnick, a pediatrician who becomes Judith's second ex-husband (seasons 2, 4–10, 12)
- Rebecca McFarland as Leanne, Pavlov's bartender (seasons 1–10)
- J. D. Walsh as Gordon, a pizza delivery guy who idolizes Charlie's lifestyle (seasons 1–4, 6–8)
- Emmanuelle Vaugier as Mia, Charlie's ex-fiancée (seasons 3, 5–7, 9, and 12)
- Robert Wagner as Nathan Krunk (alias "Teddy Leopold"), Evelyn's fifth husband, thought to be Courtney's father, but later revealed to be a con artist (seasons 4–5)
- Ming-Na Wen as the Hon. Linda Harris, superior court judge, adjunct law professor and Charlie's girlfriend (season 5)
- Jenny McCarthy as Sylvia Fishman (alias "Courtney Leopold"), alleged daughter of Nathan Krunk (alias "Teddy Leopold") (seasons 5, 8–9)
- Martin Mull as Russell, Charlie's self-medicating pharmacist (seasons 6–10)
- Kelly Stables as Melissa, Alan's receptionist, who dates both Charlie and Alan (seasons 6–8)
- Tinashe Kachingwe as Celeste Burnette, Jake's girlfriend whose father strongly disapproves of their relationship (seasons 6–7)
- Graham Patrick Martin as Eldridge McElroy, Lyndsey's son and Jake's equally dim-witted best friend (seasons 7–9)
- Carl Reiner as Marty Pepper, Evelyn's boyfriend and later husband (seasons 7–8, 11)
- Judy Greer as Bridget, Walden's ex-wife (seasons 9–12); also played Myra Melnick, Herb Melnick's sister and Charlie's one-night fling (season 4)
- Mimi Rogers as Robin Schmidt, Walden's mother (season 9–12)
- Sophie Winkleman as Zoey Hyde-Tottingham-Pierce, Walden's love interest following his divorce from Bridget (seasons 9–10, 12)
- Talyan Wright as Ava Pierce, Zoey's seven-year-old daughter (seasons 9–10)
- Patton Oswalt as Billy Stanhope, Walden's former business partner who dates Bridget (seasons 9–10)
- Brooke D'Orsay as Kate, Walden's love interest (seasons 10–11); also played Robin, Charlie's sex partner (season 4, episode 16)
- Missi Pyle as Miss Dolores Pasternak, Jake's teacher (seasons 2, 7, 9 and 12; played by Alicia Witt in season 6)
- Macey Cruthird as Megan, Jake's math tutor and later girlfriend (seasons 8–9)
- D. B. Sweeney as Larry Martin, a good friend of Alan and Walden's, who incidentally, was Lyndsey's boyfriend after Alan (seasons 11–12)
- Miley Cyrus as Missi, an old family friend of Walden's, who becomes Jake's brief love interest (season 10)
- Odette Annable as Nicole, brief love interest of Walden and majority owner of a garage-based tech start-up Walden joins (season 11)
- Clark Duke as Barry Foster, Nicole's business partner who befriends Walden and pretends to be the new "half-man" after Jake moved to Japan (seasons 11–12)
- Aly Michalka as Brooke, Jenny's girlfriend (season 11)
- Kimberly Williams-Paisley as Gretchen Martin, Larry Martin's sister, who dates Alan while Larry is with Lyndsey (season 11) (also worked with Courtney Thorne-Smith on ABC's According to Jim as her TV sister)
- Maggie Lawson as Ms. McMartin, Walden and Alan's social worker for Louis' adoption (season 12)

=== Guest stars ===
Guest stars have included:

- Aisha Tyler as an adoption lawyer to whom Walden goes when he wants a child (season 12, episode 1)
- Alana de la Garza as Crystal, Laura Lang's assistant (season 1, episode 21)
- Alicia Witt as Dolores Pasternak, Jake's teacher who becomes a stripper (season 6)
- Allison Janney as Beverly, Alan's online dating partner (season 4)
- Amy Hill as Mrs. Wiggins, Alan's receptionist after Melissa leaves him (season 7)
- Annie Potts as Lenore, mother of Judith and Liz (season 7)
- Arnold Schwarzenegger as Lieutenant Wagner ("Of Course He's Dead", series finale)
- Brad Paisley as Derek (season 11, episode 22), Gretchen Martin's fiancé, before she broke it off to date Alan
- Brenda Koo as Julie (season 12, episode 7)
- Brit Morgan as a girl Walden picks up at a bar (season 10, episode 1)
- Brooke Shields as Danielle, Charlie and Alan's neighbor (season 4)
- Camryn Manheim as Daisy, Berta's sister (season 2)
- Carol Kane as Shelly, Melissa's mother (season 6)
- Chris O'Donnell as Jill/Bill Shrader, Charlie's transgender ex-girlfriend (season 1, episode 18)
- Christian Slater as himself (series finale)
- Christina Moore as Cynthia Sullivan, Judith's best friend (season 5)
- Chuck Lorre as himself, the program's producer ("Of Course He's Dead", series finale)
- Cloris Leachman as Norma, Charlie and Alan's neighbor, Alan's "sugar momma" and Charlie's former "sugar momma" (season 3)
- David Denman as Jack (season 12), an old friend of Walden whom he meets at the bar
- Deanna Russo as Laurel (season 12, episode 7)
- Denise Richards as Lisa, Charlie's former girlfriend (season 1, episode 10; season 2, episode 9)
- Diedrich Bader as Dirk, a Denver pawn-shop owner (season 11, episode 21)
- Diora Baird as Wanda, a girl who chases after Charlie when he is engaged to Chelsea (season 6, episode 16)
- Eddie Van Halen as himself (season 7, episode 1)
- Elvis Costello as himself, Charlie's support, whisky and cigar group buddy (season 2, episode 1)
- Emilio Estevez as Andy, Charlie's long-time friend who dies before him (season 6, episode 11)
- Emily Osment as Ashley, Jake's girlfriend (season 10, episode 20)
- Emily Rose as Janine (season 6, episode 12)
- Enrique Iglesias as Fernando, Charlie's carpenter/handyman (season 4, episode 23)
- Eric Allan Kramer as Bill (season 1)
- Erinn Hayes as Gretchen, a one-night stand of Alan's (season 8, episode 5)
- Fire Ice as Rapper Cool Dawgie
- Frances Fisher as Priscilla Honeycutt, Alan's patient (season 7, episode 19)
- Gail O'Grady as Mandi, mother of Kandi, ex-wife of Andy and brief love interest of Charlie (season 3)
- Garry Marshall as Garry, one of Marty's friends (season 11, episode 13)
- Gary Busey as himself, Alan's roommate in a sanitarium (season 9)
- Georgia Engel as Jean, Lyndsey's mother (season 9, episodes 19–20)
- Harry Dean Stanton as himself, Charlie's support, whisky and cigar group buddy (season 2, episode 1)
- Heather Locklear as Laura Lang, Alan's divorce attorney (season 1, episode 21)
- Hilary Duff as Stacy, a ditzy one-night stand of Walden's (season 10, episode 23)
- Ion Overman as Vicki, Charlie Waffles' supermarket pickup (season 5, episode 8)
- Iqbal Theba as Don, a taxi driver who Charlie insults (season 6, episode 13)
- Jack Plotnick as Mike (season 5, episode 18)
- Jaime Pressly as Tammy, Jake's cougar girlfriend (season 10)
- James Earl Jones as himself (season 6, episode 11)
- Jason Alexander as Dr. Goodman, Alan's doctor (season 9, episode 23)
- Jeff Probst as himself, Walden and Alan's love rival (season 11)
- Jenna Elfman as Frankie (season one, episodes 15 and 16) and as Dharma (season 9, episode 1)
- Jeri Ryan as Sherri, Charlie's and later Alan's girlfriend (season 2, episodes 5 and 19; season 9, episode 1)
- Jessica Collins as Gloria, one of Charlie's one-night stands (season 4, episode 11)
- Jodi Lyn O'Keefe as Isabella (season 3, episode 6)
- John Amos as Ed, boyfriend of Chelsea's father Tom (season 7)
- John Stamos as himself (seasons 9 and 12)
- Jon Lovitz as Archie Baldwin, Charlie's nemesis to win the advertising jingle award (season 3, episode 17)
- Josie Davis as Sandy, a girlfriend of Alan's (season 3)
- Judd Nelson as Chris McElroy, ex-husband of Alan's love interest, Lyndsey, and Eldridge's father (season 8)
- Julia Campbell as Francine, Jake's teacher (season 3)
- Kate Miner as Nadine Hore (season 11, episode 9)
- Katherine LaNasa as Lydia, Charlie's oedipal girlfriend and Evelyn's doppelgänger (season 4, episodes 6 and 10)
- Kathy Bates as "Charlie" in the afterlife (season 9, episode 22)
- Katy Mixon as Betsy, a married woman whom Charlie purports to marry after his breakup with Chelsea (season 7, episodes 7 and 16)
- Ken Jeong as a male nurse (season 2, episode 17)
- Ken Lerner as Dr. Levine (season 6, episode 24)
- Kevin Sorbo as Andy, father of Kandi, ex-husband of Mandi and brief love interest of Judith (season 3)
- Kris Iyer as Dr. Prajneep (season 1, episode 17; season 4, episode 16; season 5, episode 1)
- Liz Vassey as Kate (season 1, episode 5) and as Michelle (seasons 8–9)
- Lucy Lawless as Pamela, the ex-wife of the gay ad executive (season 2, episode 18)
- Lynda Carter as herself (season 11)
- Marco Sanchez as Hector (season 4, episode 12)
- Marilu Henner as Linda, Walden's older, more mature love interest (season 10, episode 23)
- Martin Sheen as Harvey, Rose's father and Evelyn's fling (season 3)
- Matthew Marsden as Nigel (season 9, episodes 15 and 17), Zoey's ex-husband
- Meagen Fay as Martha Melini, Chelsea's mother (seasons 6–7)
- Megan Fox as Prudence, Berta's granddaughter (season 1, episode 12)
- Michael Bolton as himself (seasons 10 and 12)
- Michael Clarke Duncan as Jerome Burnette, a retired football player, Charlie and Alan's neighbor and the father of Celeste Burnette (season 6)
- Mike Conners as Hugo, a brief love interest of Evelyn (season 4, episode 24)
- Mila Kunis as Vivian, a free-spirit hiker and Walden's love interest (season 11, episode 19)
- Morgan Fairchild as Donna (Charlie's hook-up) (season 4, episode 16)
- Nadia Bjorlin as Jill, a young woman who sleeps with Russell, and Evelyn's one-time lover (season 8)
- Noel Fisher as Freddie, Prudence's fiancé (season 1, episode 12)
- Orson Bean as Norman, an old man whose trophy wife had sex with Charlie (season 2, episode 24)
- Paget Brewster as Jamie Eckleberry, Charlie and Alan's high-school classmate (season 2, episode 12)
- Rena Sofer as Chrissy, the "mother" of Charlie's "son" (season 6, episode 1)
- Richard Kind as Artie, Charlie's manager (season 5, episode 8)
- Richard Lewis as Stan, Charlie's accountant (season 1, episode 14)
- Sam Lerner as Andrew, one of Jake's classmates (season 1, episode 8)
- Sara Erikson as Jennifer, Jake's one-time, older girlfriend (season 9, episode 17)
- Sara Rue as Naomi, Berta's daughter (season 4)
- Scott Bakula as Jerry, Ashley's ex-boyfriend (season 10, episode 20)
- Sean Penn as himself, Charlie's support, whisky and cigar group buddy (season 2, episode 1)
- Skyler Caleb as Serge (season 7, episode 5)
- Stacy Keach as Tom Melini, Chelsea's father (season 7)
- Stephanie Jacobsen as Penelope, Charlie's former lover (season 9, episode 2)
- Steve Lawrence as Steve, one of Marty's friends (season 11, episode 13)
- Steven Eckholdt as Brad, Alan's lawyer (season 7)
- Steven Tyler as himself, Charlie and Alan's neighbor and Berta's one-time employer (season 1, episode 4; season 4, episode 2)
- Susan Blakely as Angie, an author Charlie met at a bookstore (season 5, episodes 18 and 19)
- Taylor Cole as Melanie Laughlin (season 9)
- Teri Hatcher as Liz, Judith's sister (season 1, episode 19)
- Thomas Gibson as Greg (season 9, episode 1)
- Tim Conway as Tim, one of Marty's friends (season 11, episode 13)
- Tinashe Kachingwe as Celeste Burnette, Jake's ex-girlfriend (seasons 6–7)
- Tony Tripoli as Phillip, Evelyn's hairdresser (season 4)
- Travis Van Winkle as Dylan (season 9, episode 14), a young and rich man who briefly dates Lyndsey
- Tricia Helfer as Gail, Chelsea's friend (seasons 7 and 9)
- Wayne Wilderson as Roger, Evelyn's co-worker (season 4)
- Will Sasso as Andrew, a friend of Charlie's who works in a recording studio (season 7, episode 1)
- Willie Garson as Dr. Steven Staven, Lyndsey's gynecologist (season 10, episode 14)
- Yvette Nicole Brown as Mandy (season 1, episode 23)
- ZZ Top as themselves (season 7, episode 21)

As part of a crossover from the writers and executive producer of CSI: Crime Scene Investigation, George Eads made a brief cameo appearance on the May 5, 2008, episode.

Charlie Sheen's real-life brother Emilio Estevez has guest-starred as an old friend of Charlie's; his father Martin Sheen has appeared as Rose's father. Sam Sheen, the real-life daughter of Denise Richards and Charlie Sheen, appeared as Lisa's daughter on November 22, 2004. Mila Kunis, Ashton Kutcher's fiancée and later wife, appeared on the show as his love interest in season 11.

== Broadcast ==
=== Episodes ===
Season	Episodes	Originally released		Rank	Rating
Season	Episodes	First released	Last released	Rank	Rating
1	24	September 22, 2003	May 24, 2004	14	9.9
2	24	September 20, 2004	May 23, 2005	11	10.6
3	24	September 19, 2005	May 22, 2006	13	9.7
4	24	September 18, 2006	May 14, 2007	14	9.1
5	19	September 24, 2007	May 19, 2008	15	8.5
6	24	September 22, 2008	May 18, 2009	12	9.1
7	22	September 21, 2009	May 24, 2010	12	8.9
8	16	September 20, 2010	February 14, 2011	16	7.7
9	24	September 19, 2011	May 14, 2012	11	9.1
10	23	September 27, 2012	May 9, 2013	10	8.7
11	22	September 26, 2013	May 8, 2014	27	6.8
12	16	October 30, 2014	February 19, 2015	23	7.5

Each episode's title is a dialogue fragment from the episode itself, usually offering no clue to the episode's actual plotline. The show's 100th episode ("City of Great Racks") aired on October 15, 2007. To celebrate this, a casino-inspired party was held at West Hollywood's Pacific Design Center. Warner Bros. Television also distributed blue Micargi Rover bicycles adorned with the Two and a Half Men logo along with the words "100 Episodes". Each bicycle came with a note saying, "You've made us very proud. Here's to a long ride together." The cast also gave the crew sterling silver key rings from Tiffany & Co. The key rings were attached to small pendants with "100" inscribed on one side and Two and a Half Men on the other.

Seasons one through four, six and nine consist of 24 episodes. Season five was reduced to 19 episodes due to the 2007–2008 Writers Guild of America strike. Due to Sheen's personal life problems, season seven had 22 episodes. Season eight premiered on September 20, 2010, at 9:00 pm ET. CBS initially ordered 24 episodes for the season, but again due to Sheen's personal life, the show was put on hiatus after 16 episodes were produced, with production scheduled to resume on February 28. After a series of comments made by Sheen on February 24, 2011, CBS and Warner Bros. canceled the remainder of the season.

On May 13, 2011, actor Ashton Kutcher was widely reported to be replacing Charlie Sheen as the lead on the show. The show's ninth season premiered on September 19, 2011. The first episode, "Nice to Meet You, Walden Schmidt", begins with Charlie Harper's funeral and introduces Kutcher as billionaire Walden Schmidt, who buys Harper's house. On May 12, 2012, CBS renewed Two and a Half Men for a 10th season, moving it to Thursday nights at 8:30 pm, following The Big Bang Theory. For the 2013–14 season, the show was moved to the Thursday 9:30–10:00 pm Eastern slot. As of February 27, 2014, the series' time slot was moved to a half-hour earlier at the 9:00–9:30 slot.

=== Syndication and streaming ===
Two and a Half Men entered local United States broadcast syndication in 2007, with the first four seasons available to local stations (largely CW and Fox Television Stations, LLC affiliates in the major U.S. television markets through major deals with Tribune Broadcasting and the Sinclair Broadcast Group). From September 6, 2010, to November 24, 2017, FX aired the series daily nationwide (Charlie Sheen most recently starred on Anger Management on FX from 2012 to 2014). Syndicated shows are sold in multiyear cycles, with the first cycle the most expensive. Two and a Half Men's first cycle is nine years in length. If no ninth season had occurred because of Sheen's departure, due to the first cycle's premature end, Warner Bros. Television would not have received about $80 million in license fees. While local stations would prefer to have as many episodes as possible available to them, an early start to the second cycle would lower the cost of the show for them. The series began airing on Viacom-owned networks Nick at Nite and Spike (now Paramount Network) from December 6, 2017 to December 2025, and on IFC on January 1, 2018. As of July 2, 2018, the series has moved from Nick at Nite to TV Land, switching places with Mom. The series has aired on IFC’s sister networks AMC on Saturday mornings and later started airing on BBC America in early 2026. E! and USA Network started airing the series in April 2026. Cozi TV launched the series with a special "Two and a Half Day Two and a Half Men" marathon from May 2–4, 2026, featuring 48 episodes from the first two seasons. Following the marathon, the series regularly broadcasts on Cozi TV weeknights from 9:00 p.m. to 11:00 p.m. ET, and Sundays from 8:00 p.m. to 12:00 a.m. ET.

The show is available in the United States for streaming on Peacock.

== Crossovers and other appearances ==
"When Chuck pitched the idea to me ... I thought it was an intriguing idea and walked into Naren's office and he said, 'What a nut.'"

— Carol Mendelsohn

=== CSI: Crime Scene Investigation ===
In 2007, Two and a Half Men creator Chuck Lorre contacted CSI: Crime Scene Investigation executive producer Carol Mendelsohn about a crossover. At first, the idea seemed unlikely to receive approval; however, it resurfaced when Mendelsohn and Lorre were at the World Television Festival in Canada and they decided to get approval and run with it. When Mendelsohn was giving a talk, she accidentally mentioned the crossover, that same day Variety was already inquiring about the crossover episodes. Mendelsohn later stated: "We're all used to being in control and in charge of our own shows and even though this was a freelance-type situation ... there was an expectation and also a desire on all of our parts to really have a true collaboration. You have to give a little. It was sort of a life lesson, I think."

"The biggest challenge for us was doing a comedy with a murder in it. Generally, our stories are a little lighter," stated Lorre in an interview. "Would our audience go with a dead body in it? There was a moment where it could have gone either way. I think the results were spectacular. It turned out to be a really funny episode." The Two and a Half Men episode "Fish in a Drawer" was the first part of the crossover to air, on May 5, 2008, written by CSI writers Sarah Goldfinger, Evan Dunsky, Carol Mendelsohn and Naren Shankar. George Eads is the only CSI: Crime Scene Investigation cast member to make a cameo in this episode.

Three days later, the second part of the crossover aired, the CSI episode "Two and a Half Deaths". Gil Grissom (William Petersen) investigated the murder of a sitcom diva named Annabelle (Katey Sagal), who was found murdered while she was filming her show in Las Vegas. The episode was written by Two and a Half Men creators Lorre and Aronsohn; Sheen, Cryer and Jones all make uncredited cameos in this episode, in the same clothes their characters were wearing in "Fish in a Drawer".

=== Due Date ===
At the end of 2010 film Due Date, a scene from Two and a Half Men is shown, in which Sheen and Cryer appear as their characters, while Ethan Chase (played by Zach Galifianakis in the movie) plays Stu, Jake's tutor.

== Reception ==
=== Critical reception ===
Two and a Half Men received mostly mixed reviews from critics throughout its run. The New York Daily News has described the sitcom as "solid, well-acted and occasionally funny." Conversely Graeme Blundell, writing for The Australian, described it as a "sometimes creepy, misogynistic comedy". Ashton Kutcher's debut was met with mixed reviews, and reviews for season nine were also mixed. One reviewer commented that the show was made for Charlie Sheen's character and the way he interacted with other characters, and the setup did not work with Kutcher's character.

However, it has been labeled as "one of America's most successful comedy shows." Ellen Gray of Daily News praised the shows' legacy just before the premiere of the finale. The show is credited as being the reason The Big Bang Theory, Mike & Molly and Mom were all made. Men's success was what enabled these other Chuck Lorre shows to be made and be successful. Following the filming of the final episode, Stage 26 of the Warner Brothers lot was renamed the "Two and a Half Men stage". After the finale, Two and a Half Men fans launched a global petition under the name "Yes To The Harpers", to have Charlie Sheen reprise the role of Charlie Harper alongside his former co-star Jon Cryer. This idea surfaced after fans saw Chuck Lorre's vanity card about Charlie Sheen's idea of a spinoff show named The Harpers.

The first season received generally positive reviews from critics. On the review aggregator website Rotten Tomatoes, 80% of 20 critics' reviews are positive, with an average rating of 5.7/10. The website's consensus reads: "Two and a Half Men's inaugural season rises above its sitcom formula with a rapid-fire clip of bawdy quips as well as the sparky chemistry between stars Jon Cryer and Charlie Sheen."

The ninth season of the show, its first without Sheen, received generally mixed reviews from critics. On the review aggregator website Rotten Tomatoes, 41% of 27 critics' reviews are positive, with an average rating of 5.1/10. The website's consensus reads: "Ashton Kutcher proves to be a game replacement for the unceremoniously departed Charlie Sheen, but Two and a Half Men feels exhausted and bitter as it trudges beyond its natural lifespan."

The show's final season received generally negative reviews from critics. On the review aggregator website Rotten Tomatoes, 33% of 12 critics' reviews are positive. The website's consensus reads: "Two and a Half Men putters to an unpleasant end that continues to beat the dead Charlie horse while spinning an offensive, homophobic subplot."

=== Ratings ===
Seasonal rankings (based on average total viewers per episode) of Two and a Half Men on CBS:

Note: Each U.S. network television season starts in late September and ends in late May, which coincides with the completion of May sweeps.

Season	Timeslot (ET)	Episodes	Season premiere	Season finale	TV season	Ranking	Viewers (in millions)
1	Monday; 9:30pm	24	September 22, 2003	May 24, 2004	2003–04	15	15.31
2	Monday; 9:30pm	24	September 20, 2004	May 23, 2005	2004–05	11	16.45
3	Monday; 9:00pm	24	September 19, 2005	May 22, 2006	2005–06	17	15.14
4	Monday; 9:00pm	24	September 18, 2006	May 14, 2007	2006–07	21	14.43
5	Monday; 9:00pm	19	September 24, 2007	May 19, 2008	2007–08	17	13.68
6	Monday; 9:00pm	24	September 22, 2008	May 18, 2009	2008–09	10	15.06
7	Monday; 9:00pm	22	September 21, 2009	May 24, 2010	2009–10	11	14.95
8	Monday; 9:00pm	16	September 20, 2010	February 14, 2011	2010–11	17	12.73
9	Monday; 9:00pm	24	September 19, 2011	May 14, 2012	2011–12	11	14.64
10	Thursday; 8:30pm	23	September 27, 2012	May 9, 2013	2012–13	11	13.78
11	Thursday; 9:30pm	22	September 26, 2013	May 8, 2014	2013–14	27	10.66
12	Thursday; 9:00pm	16	October 30, 2014	February 19, 2015	2014–15	23	11.95

== Awards and nominations ==
The show received multiple award nominations. It was nominated for 46 Primetime Emmy Awards (winning nine, including three for Jon Cryer) and two Golden Globe Awards nominations for Charlie Sheen. The show won the award for Favorite TV Comedy at the 35th People's Choice Awards.

== Home media ==
DVD name	Ep #	Region 1	Region 2	Region 4
The Complete First Season	24	September 11, 2007	September 12, 2005	February 15, 2006
The Complete Second Season	24	January 8, 2008	August 28, 2006	September 6, 2006
The Complete Third Season	24	May 13, 2008	May 19, 2008	July 23, 2008
The Complete Fourth Season	24	September 23, 2008	October 6, 2008	October 8, 2008
The Complete Fifth Season	19	May 12, 2009	April 13, 2009	July 1, 2009
The Complete Sixth Season	24	September 1, 2009	October 19, 2009	March 3, 2010
The Complete Seventh Season	22	September 21, 2010	October 11, 2010	October 13, 2010
The Complete Eighth Season	16	September 6, 2011	August 8, 2011	August 24, 2011
The Complete Ninth Season	24	August 28, 2012	October 8, 2012	October 31, 2012
The Complete Tenth Season	23	September 24, 2013	October 7, 2013	October 23, 2013
The Complete Eleventh Season	22	October 14, 2014	October 20, 2014	December 3, 2014
The Complete Twelfth & Final Season	16	June 16, 2015	August 10, 2015	November 4, 2015

== Potential reboot ==
When Sheen appeared on the April 2019 broadcast of Loose Women, he expressed interest in a potential revival, hoping to make two more seasons to tie up loose characters ends. In response, Jon Cryer expressed reluctance to return to working with Sheen full time, comparing it to a roller coaster.

In December 2023, after Sheen had a role in Chuck Lorre's new show Bookie alongside Angus Jones, ending their rivalries, Jon Cryer said that he was not going to rule anything out towards a possible reboot of the show. However, in February 2024 Cryer said that he doesn't know if he wants to work with Sheen "for any length of time".
