= List of Two and a Half Men episodes =

Two and a Half Men is an American television sitcom created by Chuck Lorre and Lee Aronsohn that premiered on CBS on September 22, 2003.

On March 13, 2014, Two and a Half Men was renewed for a twelfth season, which was announced the following May to be the final season, that premiered on October 30, 2014. During the course of the series, 262 episodes of Two and a Half Men aired over twelve seasons, between September 22, 2003, and February 19, 2015.

== Series overview ==
Season	Episodes	Originally released		Rank	Rating
Season	Episodes	First released	Last released	Rank	Rating
1	24	September 22, 2003	May 24, 2004	14	9.9
2	24	September 20, 2004	May 23, 2005	11	10.6
3	24	September 19, 2005	May 22, 2006	13	9.7
4	24	September 18, 2006	May 14, 2007	14	9.1
5	19	September 24, 2007	May 19, 2008	15	8.5
6	24	September 22, 2008	May 18, 2009	12	9.1
7	22	September 21, 2009	May 24, 2010	12	8.9
8	16	September 20, 2010	February 14, 2011	16	7.7
9	24	September 19, 2011	May 14, 2012	11	9.1
10	23	September 27, 2012	May 9, 2013	10	8.7
11	22	September 26, 2013	May 8, 2014	27	6.8
12	16	October 30, 2014	February 19, 2015	23	7.5

== Episodes ==
Each episode's title is a phrase spoken by one of the characters in that episode. The three exceptions are the pilot episode and the episodes "Alan Harper, Frontier Chiropractor" (season 1) and "Frankenstein and the Horny Villagers" (season 2). The latter episode does fit the criterion, but the quote was part of a deleted scene which Chuck Lorre explains in the episode's vanity card.

Three episode titles are not direct quotes: "Twenty-Five Little Pre-Pubers Without a Snootful" (season 1), "Who's Vod Kanockers?" (season 4), and "Chocolate Diddlers or My Puppy's Dead" (season 8). Charlie states "I'm not going to face all those pre-pubers without a snootful", but the number twenty-five is never mentioned. Jake actually asks "Who is this Vod Kanockers that you speak of?"; however, on the DVD release, that episode is titled "Who Is This Vod Kanockers?". When Charlie sings his song called "Chocolate Diddlers", Alan only suggests that it sounds more like "My Puppy's Dead".

=== Season 1 (2003–04) ===
No. overall	No. in season	Title	Directed by	Written by	Original release date	Prod. code	U.S. viewers (millions)
1	1	"Pilot"	James Burrows	Chuck Lorre & Lee Aronsohn	September 22, 2003	475215	18.44
2	2	"Big Flappy Bastards"	Andy Ackerman	Story by : Chuck Lorre & Lee Aronsohn; Teleplay by : Eddie Gorodetsky & Jeff Abugov	September 29, 2003	176802	16.18
3	3	"Go East on Sunset Until You Reach the Gates of Hell"	Andy Ackerman	Story by : Chuck Lorre & Don Foster; Teleplay by : Mark Roberts & Lee Aronsohn	October 6, 2003	176803	14.82
4	4	"If I Can't Write My Chocolate Song, I'm Going to Take a Nap"	Andy Ackerman	Story by : Chuck Lorre & Lee Aronsohn; Teleplay by : Susan Beavers & Don Foster	October 13, 2003	176801	14.73
5	5	"The Last Thing You Want Is to Wind Up with a Hump"	Andy Ackerman	Story by : Chuck Lorre & Lee Aronsohn; Teleplay by : Eddie Gorodetsky & Jeff Abugov	October 20, 2003	176805	15.24
6	6	"Did You Check with the Captain of the Flying Monkeys?"	Andy Ackerman	Story by : Chuck Lorre & Lee Aronsohn; Teleplay by : Susan Beavers & Don Foster	October 27, 2003	176804	15.82
7	7	"If They Do Go Either Way, They're Usually Fake"	Andy Ackerman	Story by : Chuck Lorre & Don Foster; Teleplay by : Mark Roberts & Lee Aronsohn	November 3, 2003	176806	16.02
8	8	"Twenty-Five Little Pre-pubers Without a Snootful"	Chuck Lorre	Story by : Chuck Lorre & Lee Aronsohn; Teleplay by : Eddie Gorodetsky & Jeff Abugov	November 10, 2003	176808	15.82
9	9	"Phase One, Complete"	Andy Ackerman	Story by : Chuck Lorre & Lee Aronsohn; Teleplay by : Susan Beavers & Don Foster	November 17, 2003	176807	15.98
10	10	"Merry Thanksgiving"	Jay Sandrich	Chuck Lorre & Lee Aronsohn	November 24, 2003	176809	17.14
11	11	"Alan Harper, Frontier Chiropractor"	Robert Berlinger	Story by : Chuck Lorre & Don Foster; Teleplay by : Lee Aronsohn & Mark Roberts	December 15, 2003	176810	14.77
12	12	"Camel Filters and Pheromones"	Robert Berlinger	Story by : Chuck Lorre & Lee Aronsohn; Teleplay by : Susan Beavers & Mark Roberts	January 5, 2004	176813	16.75
13	13	"Sarah Like Puny Alan"	Robert Berlinger	Story by : Chuck Lorre; Teleplay by : Lee Aronsohn & Don Foster	January 12, 2004	176811	17.86
14	14	"I Can't Afford Hyenas"	Rob Schiller	Story by : Chuck Lorre & Lee Aronsohn; Teleplay by : Jeff Abugov & Eddie Gorodetsky	February 2, 2004	176812	16.48
15	15	"Round One to the Hot Crazy Chick"	Andrew D. Weyman	Chuck Lorre & Lee Aronsohn	February 9, 2004	176814	16.96
16	16	"That Was Saliva, Alan"	Andrew D. Weyman	Chuck Lorre & Lee Aronsohn	February 16, 2004	176815	17.39
17	17	"Ate the Hamburgers, Wearing the Hats"	Andrew D. Weyman	Story by : Jeff Abugov & Eric Lapidus; Teleplay by : Eddie Gorodetsky & Mark Roberts	February 23, 2004	176816	16.48
18	18	"An Old Flame with a New Wick"	Andrew D. Weyman	Story by : Chuck Lorre & Don Foster; Teleplay by : Lee Aronsohn & Mark Roberts	March 1, 2004	176818	17.10
19	19	"I Remember the Coatroom, I Just Don't Remember You"	Gail Mancuso	Story by : Chuck Lorre & Lee Aronsohn; Teleplay by : Don Foster & Eddie Gorodetsky	March 22, 2004	176819	16.43
20	20	"Hey, I Can Pee Outside in the Dark"	Gary Halvorson	Story by : Chuck Lorre & Lee Aronsohn; Teleplay by : Jeff Abugov & Mark Roberts	April 19, 2004	176820	14.58
21	21	"No Sniffing, No Wowing"	Rob Schiller	Story by : Lee Aronsohn & Susan Beavers; Teleplay by : Chuck Lorre & Don Foster	May 3, 2004	176817	16.20
22	22	"My Doctor Has a Cow Puppet"	Gail Mancuso	Story by : Lee Aronsohn & Don Foster; Teleplay by : Chuck Lorre & Eddie Gorodetsky	May 10, 2004	176821	16.01
23	23	"Just Like Buffalo"	Rob Schiller	Story by : Chuck Lorre & Susan Beavers; Teleplay by : Lee Aronsohn & Don Foster	May 17, 2004	176822	15.20
24	24	"Can You Feel My Finger?"	Rob Schiller	Story by : Chuck Lorre; Teleplay by : Chuck Lorre & Lee Aronsohn	May 24, 2004	176823	18.16

=== Season 2 (2004–05) ===
No. overall	No. in season	Title	Directed by	Written by	Original release date	Prod. code	U.S. viewers (millions)
25	1	"Back Off, Mary Poppins"	Pamela Fryman	Story by : Chuck Lorre; Teleplay by : Lee Aronsohn & Susan Beavers	September 20, 2004	177653	16.44
26	2	"Enjoy Those Garlic Balls"	Pamela Fryman	Story by : Chuck Lorre & Lee Aronsohn; Teleplay by : Don Foster & Eddie Gorodetsky	September 27, 2004	177651	16.60
27	3	"A Bag Full of Jawea"	Pamela Fryman	Story by : Chuck Lorre & Lee Aronsohn; Teleplay by : Jeff Abugov & Mark Roberts	October 4, 2004	177652	16.43
28	4	"Go Get Mommy's Bra"	Pamela Fryman	Story by : Lee Aronsohn & Don Foster; Teleplay by : Chuck Lorre & Eddie Gorodetsky	October 11, 2004	177654	17.15
29	5	"Bad News from the Clinic?"	Pamela Fryman	Story by : Chuck Lorre & Lee Aronsohn; Teleplay by : Mark Roberts & Jeff Abugov	October 18, 2004	177655	16.28
30	6	"The Price of Healthy Gums is Eternal Vigilance"	Pamela Fryman	Story by : Chuck Lorre & Lee Aronsohn; Teleplay by : Mark Roberts & Eddie Gorodetsky	October 25, 2004	177656	17.25
31	7	"A Kosher Slaughterhouse Out in Fontana"	Pamela Fryman	Story by : Don Foster; Teleplay by : Chuck Lorre & Lee Aronsohn	November 8, 2004	177658	16.04
32	8	"Frankenstein and the Horny Villagers"	Pamela Fryman	Story by : Don Foster & Jeff Abugov; Teleplay by : Chuck Lorre & Lee Aronsohn	November 15, 2004	177657	17.47
33	9	"Yes, Monsignor"	Pamela Fryman	Story by : Chuck Lorre & Lee Aronsohn; Teleplay by : Jeff Abugov & Susan Beavers	November 22, 2004	177659	18.94
34	10	"The Salmon Under My Sweater"	Pamela Fryman	Story by : Don Foster & Mark Roberts; Teleplay by : Chuck Lorre & Lee Aronsohn	November 29, 2004	177660	17.88
35	11	"Last Chance to See Those Tattoos"	Pamela Fryman	Chuck Lorre & Lee Aronsohn	December 13, 2004	177661	16.22
36	12	"A Lungful of Alan"	Pamela Fryman	Story by : Chuck Lorre & Lee Aronsohn; Teleplay by : Mark Roberts & Eddie Gorodetsky	January 3, 2005	177662	18.03
37	13	"Zejdź z Moich Włosów (a.k.a. Get Off My Hair)"	Pamela Fryman	Story by : Susan Beavers & Eddie Gorodetsky; Teleplay by : Chuck Lorre & Lee Aronsohn	January 17, 2005	177663	18.14
38	14	"Those Big Pink Things with Coconut"	Pamela Fryman	Story by : Chuck Lorre & Lee Aronsohn; Teleplay by : Don Foster & Jeff Abugov	January 31, 2005	177664	17.01
39	15	"Smell the Umbrella Stand"	Pamela Fryman	Story by : Chuck Lorre & Lee Aronsohn; Teleplay by : Don Foster & Susan Beavers	February 7, 2005	177665	16.75
40	16	"Can You Eat Human Flesh with Wooden Teeth?"	Pamela Fryman	Story by : Chuck Lorre & Lee Aronsohn; Teleplay by : Don Foster & Susan Beavers	February 14, 2005	177666	16.78
41	17	"Woo-Hoo, a Hernia Exam!"	Pamela Fryman	Story by : Mark Roberts & Susan Beavers; Teleplay by : Chuck Lorre & Lee Aronsohn	February 21, 2005	177667	17.50
42	18	"It Was 'Mame,' Mom"	Pamela Fryman	Story by : Chuck Lorre & Lee Aronsohn; Teleplay by : Eddie Gorodetsky & Mark Roberts	March 7, 2005	177668	17.45
43	19	"A Low, Guttural Tongue-Flapping Noise"	Gary Halvorson	Story by : Mark Roberts & Eddie Gorodetsky; Teleplay by : Chuck Lorre & Lee Aronsohn	March 21, 2005	177669	15.92
44	20	"I Always Wanted a Shaved Monkey"	Asaad Kelada	Story by : Susan Beavers & Jeff Abugov; Teleplay by : Chuck Lorre & Lee Aronsohn	April 18, 2005	177673	17.13
45	21	"A Sympathetic Crotch to Cry On"	Pamela Fryman	Story by : Chuck Lorre & Lee Aronsohn; Teleplay by : Mark Roberts & Eddie Gorodetsky	May 2, 2005	177671	17.93
46	22	"That Old Hose Bag is My Mother"	Gary Halvorson	Story by : Chuck Lorre & Lee Aronsohn; Teleplay by : Mark Roberts & Don Foster	May 9, 2005	177670	17.96
47	23	"Squab, Squab, Squab, Squab, Squab"	J.D. Lobue	Story by : Chuck Lorre & Lee Aronsohn; Teleplay by : Susan Beavers & Don Foster	May 16, 2005	177674	24.24
48	24	"Does This Smell Funny to You?"	Pamela Fryman	Story by : Chuck Lorre & Lee Aronsohn; Teleplay by : Susan Beavers & Jeff Abugov	May 23, 2005	177672	14.37

=== Season 3 (2005–06) ===
No. overall	No. in season	Title	Directed by	Written by	Original release date	Prod. code	U.S. viewers (millions)
49	1	"Weekend in Bangkok with Two Olympic Gymnasts"	Gary Halvorson	Chuck Lorre & Lee Aronsohn	September 19, 2005	2T6501	15.04
50	2	"Principal Gallagher's Lesbian Lover"	Gary Halvorson	Story by : Susan Beavers & Eddie Gorodetsky; Teleplay by : Chuck Lorre & Lee Aronsohn	September 26, 2005	2T6503	14.37
51	3	"Carpet Burns and a Bite Mark"	Gary Halvorson	Story by : Chuck Lorre; Teleplay by : Lee Aronsohn & Don Foster	October 3, 2005	2T6505	14.21
52	4	"Your Dismissive Attitude Toward Boobs"	Gary Halvorson	Story by : Chuck Lorre & Lee Aronsohn; Teleplay by : Eddie Gorodetsky & Mark Roberts	October 10, 2005	2T6502	15.24
53	5	"We Called It Mr. Pinky"	Gary Halvorson	Story by : Mark Roberts & Susan Beavers; Teleplay by : Chuck Lorre & Lee Aronsohn	October 17, 2005	2T6504	15.56
54	6	"Hi, Mr. Horned One"	Gary Halvorson	Story by : Eddie Gorodetsky & Mark Roberts; Teleplay by : Chuck Lorre & Lee Aronsohn	October 24, 2005	2T6506	16.77
55	7	"Sleep Tight, Puddin' Pop"	Gary Halvorson	Story by : Eddie Gorodetsky & Don Foster; Teleplay by : Chuck Lorre & Lee Aronsohn	November 7, 2005	2T6507	16.19
56	8	"That Voodoo That I Do Do"	Gary Halvorson	Story by : Chuck Lorre & Lee Aronsohn; Teleplay by : Eddie Gorodetsky & Mark Roberts	November 14, 2005	2T6508	15.17
57	9	"Madame and Her Special Friend"	Asaad Kelada	Story by : Jeff Abugov & Susan Beavers; Teleplay by : Chuck Lorre & Lee Aronsohn	November 21, 2005	2T6509	15.75
58	10	"Something Salted and Twisted"	Rob Schiller	Story by : Eddie Gorodetsky & Mark Roberts; Teleplay by : Chuck Lorre & Lee Aronsohn	November 28, 2005	2T6510	16.53
59	11	"Santa's Village of the Damned"	Rob Schiller	Story by : Chuck Lorre & Lee Aronsohn; Teleplay by : Don Foster & Susan Beavers	December 19, 2005	2T6512	17.71
60	12	"That Special Tug"	Rob Schiller	Story by : Don Foster & Susan Beavers; Teleplay by : Chuck Lorre & Lee Aronsohn	January 9, 2006	2T6513	17.20
61	13	"Humiliation is a Visual Medium"	Rob Schiller	Story by : Chuck Lorre & Lee Aronsohn; Teleplay by : Mark Roberts & Eddie Gorodetsky	January 23, 2006	2T6511	17.07
62	14	"Love Isn't Blind, It's Retarded"	Gary Halvorson	Story by : Chuck Lorre & Lee Aronsohn & Jeff Abugov; Teleplay by : Don Foster & Susan Beavers	February 6, 2006	2T6514	16.33
63	15	"My Tongue is Meat"	Gary Halvorson	Story by : Eddie Gorodetsky & Mark Roberts; Teleplay by : Chuck Lorre & Lee Aronsohn	February 27, 2006	2T6515	17.04
64	16	"Ergo, the Booty Call"	Gary Halvorson	Story by : Chuck Lorre & Lee Aronsohn; Teleplay by : Don Foster & Susan Beavers	March 6, 2006	2T6516	17.06
65	17	"The Unfortunate Little Schnauzer"	Gary Halvorson	Story by : Chuck Lorre & Lee Aronsohn; Teleplay by : Mark Roberts & Eddie Gorodetsky	March 13, 2006	2T6517	17.37
66	18	"The Spit-Covered Cobbler"	Gary Halvorson	Story by : Eddie Gorodetsky & Mark Roberts; Teleplay by : Chuck Lorre & Lee Aronsohn	March 20, 2006	2T6518	16.72
67	19	"Golly Moses, She's a Muffin"	Gary Halvorson	Story by : Chuck Lorre & Lee Aronsohn; Teleplay by : Mark Roberts & Eddie Gorodetsky	April 10, 2006	2T6519	14.05
68	20	"Always a Bridesmaid, Never a Burro"	Gary Halvorson	Story by : Lee Aronsohn & Chuck Lorre; Teleplay by : Susan Beavers & Don Foster	April 24, 2006	2T6520	14.47
69	21	"And the Plot Moistens"	Jerry Zaks	Story by : Eddie Gorodetsky & Jim Patterson; Teleplay by : Chuck Lorre & Lee Aronsohn & Mark Roberts	May 1, 2006	2T6521	14.31
70	22	"Just Once with Aunt Sophie"	Lee Aronsohn	Lee Aronsohn & Chuck Lorre	May 8, 2006	2T6524	14.87
71	23	"Arguments for the Quickie"	James Widdoes	Story by : Susan Beavers & Don Foster; Teleplay by : Chuck Lorre & Lee Aronsohn	May 15, 2006	2T6522	11.04
72	24	"That Pistol-Packin' Hermaphrodite"	James Widdoes	Story by : Chuck Lorre & Lee Aronsohn; Teleplay by : Susan Beavers & Don Foster	May 22, 2006	2T6523	15.51

=== Season 4 (2006–07) ===
No. overall	No. in season	Title	Directed by	Written by	Original release date	Prod. code	U.S. viewers (millions)
73	1	"Working for Caligula"	Gary Halvorson	Lee Aronsohn & Chuck Lorre	September 18, 2006	2T7951	15.09
74	2	"Who's Vod Kanockers?"	Gary Halvorson	Story by : Chuck Lorre & Lee Aronsohn; Teleplay by : Don Foster & Eddie Gorodetsky	September 25, 2006	2T7952	15.28
75	3	"The Sea is a Harsh Mistress"	Gary Halvorson	Story by : Chuck Lorre & Lee Aronsohn; Teleplay by : Eddie Gorodetsky & Mark Roberts	October 2, 2006	2T7953	15.80
76	4	"A Pot Smoking Monkey"	Gary Halvorson	Story by : Bill Prady & Maria Espada Pearce; Teleplay by : Chuck Lorre & Lee Aronsohn & Susan Beavers	October 9, 2006	2T7954	16.38
77	5	"A Live Woman of Proven Fertility"	Gary Halvorson	Story by : Don Foster & Susan Beavers; Teleplay by : Chuck Lorre & Lee Aronsohn	October 16, 2006	2T7955	16.25
78	6	"Apologies for the Frivolity"	Gary Halvorson	Story by : Chuck Lorre & Lee Aronsohn; Teleplay by : Don Foster & Mark Roberts	October 23, 2006	2T7956	15.03
79	7	"Repeated Blows to His Unformed Head"	Gary Halvorson	Story by : Chuck Lorre & Lee Aronsohn; Teleplay by : Eddie Gorodetsky & Jim Patterson	November 6, 2006	2T7957	14.48
80	8	"Release the Dogs"	Gary Halvorson	Story by : Susan Beavers & Jim Patterson; Teleplay by : Chuck Lorre & Lee Aronsohn	November 13, 2006	2T7958	15.83
81	9	"Corey's Been Dead for an Hour"	Gary Halvorson	Story by : Mark Roberts & Don Foster; Teleplay by : Lee Aronsohn & Chuck Lorre	November 20, 2006	2T7959	15.04
82	10	"Kissing Abe Lincoln"	Gary Halvorson	Story by : Eddie Gorodetsky & Mark Roberts; Teleplay by : Chuck Lorre & Lee Aronsohn	November 27, 2006	2T7960	15.50
83	11	"Walnuts and Demerol"	Gary Halvorson	Story by : Lee Aronsohn & Chuck Lorre; Teleplay by : Susan Beavers & Jim Patterson	December 11, 2006	2T7961	15.69
84	12	"Castrating Sheep in Montana"	James Widdoes	Story by : Chuck Lorre & Lee Aronsohn; Teleplay by : Mark Roberts & Eddie Gorodetsky	January 8, 2007	2T7962	14.78
85	13	"Don't Worry, Speed Racer"	Gary Halvorson	Story by : Mark Roberts & Susan Beavers; Teleplay by : Chuck Lorre & Lee Aronsohn	January 22, 2007	2T7963	15.85
86	14	"That's Summer Sausage, Not Salami"	Gary Halvorson	Story by : Chuck Lorre & Lee Aronsohn; Teleplay by : Don Foster & Susan Beavers & Jim Patterson	February 5, 2007	2T7966	17.68
87	15	"My Damn Stalker"	James Widdoes	Story by : Chuck Lorre & Lee Aronsohn; Teleplay by : Mark Roberts & Eddie Gorodetsky	February 12, 2007	2T7964	15.50
88	16	"Young People Have Phlegm Too"	Andrew D. Weyman	Story by : Eddie Gorodetsky & Mark Roberts; Teleplay by : Chuck Lorre & Lee Aronsohn	February 19, 2007	2T7965	16.56
89	17	"I Merely Slept with a Commie"	Gary Halvorson	Story by : Chuck Lorre & Lee Aronsohn; Teleplay by : Susan Beavers & Jim Patterson	February 26, 2007	2T7967	16.58
90	18	"It Never Rains in Hooterville"	Gary Halvorson	Story by : Lee Aronsohn & Chuck Lorre; Teleplay by : Don Foster & Mark Roberts	March 19, 2007	2T7968	11.68
91	19	"Smooth as a Ken Doll"	Gary Halvorson	Story by : Chuck Lorre & Lee Aronsohn; Teleplay by : Susan Beavers & Eddie Gorodetsky & Don Foster	April 9, 2007	2T7969	13.46
92	20	"Aunt Myra Doesn't Pee a Lot"	Jerry Zaks	Story by : Eddie Gorodetsky & Jim Patterson; Teleplay by : Lee Aronsohn & Chuck Lorre	April 16, 2007	2T7970	13.03
93	21	"Tucked, Taped and Gorgeous"	Jerry Zaks	Story by : Chuck Lorre & Lee Aronsohn; Teleplay by : Mark Roberts & Don Foster	April 23, 2007	2T7971	12.27
94	22	"Mr. McGlue's Feedbag"	Jon Cryer	Story by : Lee Aronsohn & Chuck Lorre; Teleplay by : Jim Patterson & Don Foster	April 30, 2007	2T7972	13.71
95	23	"Anteaters. They're Just Crazy-Lookin'"	Lee Aronsohn	Story by : Lee Aronsohn & Chuck Lorre; Teleplay by : Don Foster & Mark Roberts & Jim Patterson	May 7, 2007	2T7974	13.27
96	24	"Prostitutes and Gelato"	Ted Wass	Story by : Susan Beavers & Eddie Gorodetsky; Teleplay by : Chuck Lorre & Lee Aronsohn	May 14, 2007	2T7973	10.16

=== Season 5 (2007–08) ===
No. overall	No. in season	Title	Directed by	Written by	Original release date	Prod. code	U.S. viewers (millions)
97	1	"Large Birds, Spiders and Mom"	Ted Wass	Story by : Mark Roberts & Eddie Gorodetsky; Teleplay by : Lee Aronsohn & Chuck Lorre	September 24, 2007	3T6251	13.58
98	2	"Media Room Slash Dungeon"	Ted Wass	Story by : Chuck Lorre & Lee Aronsohn; Teleplay by : Don Foster & Susan Beavers & Jim Patterson	October 1, 2007	3T6252	13.24
99	3	"Dum Diddy Dum Diddy Doo"	Ted Wass	Lee Aronsohn & Chuck Lorre	October 8, 2007	3T6253	13.02
100	4	"City of Great Racks"	James Widdoes	Story by : Chuck Lorre & Lee Aronsohn & Don Foster & Mark Roberts; Teleplay by : Eddie Gorodetsky & Susan Beavers & Jim Patterson	October 15, 2007	3T6254	13.69
101	5	"Putting Swim Fins on a Cat"	James Widdoes	Story by : Mark Roberts; Teleplay by : Don Foster & Eddie Gorodetsky	October 22, 2007	3T6255	13.94
102	6	"Help Daddy Find His Toenail"	James Widdoes	Story by : Chuck Lorre & Lee Aronsohn; Teleplay by : Susan Beavers & Jim Patterson	October 29, 2007	3T6256	13.73
103	7	"Our Leather Gear is in the Guest Room"	Ted Wass	Chuck Lorre & Lee Aronsohn	November 5, 2007	3T6257	13.80
104	8	"Is There a Mrs. Waffles?"	Ted Wass	Story by : Susan Beavers & Jim Patterson; Teleplay by : Chuck Lorre & Lee Aronsohn	November 12, 2007	3T6258	14.12
105	9	"Tight's Good"	Jean Sagal	Story by : Mark Roberts; Teleplay by : Don Foster & Eddie Gorodetsky	November 19, 2007	3T6259	13.91
106	10	"Kinda Like Necrophilia"	Ted Wass	Story by : Jim Patterson & Susan Beavers; Teleplay by : Chuck Lorre & Lee Aronsohn	November 26, 2007	3T6260	15.26
107	11	"Meander to Your Dander"	James Widdoes	Story by : Don Foster & Mark Roberts; Teleplay by : Susan Beavers & Jim Patterson	March 17, 2008	3T6261	14.06
108	12	"A Little Clammy and None Too Fresh"	James Widdoes	Story by : Susan Beavers & Jim Patterson; Teleplay by : Chuck Lorre & Lee Aronsohn	March 24, 2008	3T6263	14.24
109	13	"The Soil is Moist"	James Widdoes	Story by : Eddie Gorodetsky; Teleplay by : Chuck Lorre & Lee Aronsohn	March 31, 2008	3T6262	14.50
110	14	"Winky-Dink Time"	James Widdoes	Story by : Mark Roberts; Teleplay by : Eddie Gorodetsky & Jim Patterson	April 14, 2008	3T6264	13.94
111	15	"Rough Night in Hump Junction"	James Widdoes	Story by : Mark Roberts; Teleplay by : Chuck Lorre & Lee Aronsohn	April 21, 2008	3T6265	13.36
112	16	"Look at Me, Mommy, I'm Pretty"	Joel Zwick	Story by : Chuck Lorre & Lee Aronsohn; Teleplay by : Eddie Gorodetsky & Don Foster & Susan Beavers	April 28, 2008	3T6266	12.92
113	17	"Fish in a Drawer"	Jeff Melman	Story by : Carol Mendelsohn & Naren Shankar; Teleplay by : Sarah Goldfinger & Evan Dunsky	May 5, 2008	3T6267	13.61
114	18	"If My Hole Could Talk"	Jon Cryer	Story by : Chuck Lorre & Lee Aronsohn; Teleplay by : Eddie Gorodetsky & Jim Patterson & Mark Roberts	May 12, 2008	3T6268	13.82
115	19	"Waiting for the Right Snapper"	Jeff Melman	Story by : Eddie Gorodetsky & Don Foster; Teleplay by : Mark Roberts & Lee Aronsohn & Chuck Lorre	May 19, 2008	3T6269	14.70

=== Season 6 (2008–09) ===
No. overall	No. in season	Title	Directed by	Written by	Original release date	Prod. code	U.S. viewers (millions)
116	1	"Taterhead is Our Love Child"	James Widdoes	Story by : Chuck Lorre & Lee Aronsohn; Teleplay by : Mark Roberts & Don Foster & Jim Patterson	September 22, 2008	3T7401	14.88
117	2	"Pie Hole, Herb"	James Widdoes	Story by : Chuck Lorre & Lee Aronsohn; Teleplay by : Eddie Gorodetsky & Susan Beavers	September 29, 2008	3T7402	13.58
118	3	"Damn You, Eggs Benedict"	Jean Sagal	Story by : Mark Roberts & Don Foster; Teleplay by : Chuck Lorre & Lee Aronsohn	October 6, 2008	3T7403	14.07
119	4	"The Flavin' and the Mavin'"	James Widdoes	Story by : Chuck Lorre & Lee Aronsohn; Teleplay by : Eddie Gorodetsky & Jim Patterson	October 13, 2008	3T7404	14.72
120	5	"A Jock Strap in Hell"	Jean Sagal	Story by : Chuck Lorre & Lee Aronsohn; Teleplay by : Don Foster & Eddie Gorodetsky & Susan Beavers	October 20, 2008	3T7405	14.63
121	6	"It's Always Nazi Week"	James Widdoes	Story by : Chuck Lorre & Lee Aronsohn; Teleplay by : Mark Roberts & Jim Patterson	November 3, 2008	3T7406	12.76
122	7	"Best H.O. Money Can Buy"	James Widdoes	Story by : Chuck Lorre & Lee Aronsohn; Teleplay by : Mark Roberts & Don Foster & Eddie Gorodetsky	November 10, 2008	3T7407	14.50
123	8	"Pinocchio's Mouth"	Jeff Melman	Story by : Chuck Lorre & Mark Roberts; Teleplay by : Don Foster & Jim Patterson	November 17, 2008	3T7408	15.18
124	9	"The Mooch at the Boo"	Jeff Melman	Story by : Chuck Lorre & Lee Aronsohn; Teleplay by : Eddie Gorodetsky & Susan Beavers	November 24, 2008	3T7409	14.95
125	10	"He Smelled the Ham, He Got Excited"	Jeff Melman	Story by : Mark Roberts; Teleplay by : Don Foster & Susan Beavers	December 8, 2008	3T7410	15.59
126	11	"The Devil's Lube"	Jeff Melman	Story by : Chuck Lorre & Lee Aronsohn & Mark Roberts; Teleplay by : Don Foster & Eddie Gorodetsky, Susan Beavers & Jim Patterson	December 15, 2008	3T7411	17.92
127	12	"Thank God for Scoliosis"	Jeff Melman	Story by : Eddie Gorodetsky & Jim Patterson; Teleplay by : Chuck Lorre & Mark Roberts	January 12, 2009	3T7412	17.10
128	13	"I Think You Offended Don"	Jeff Melman	Story by : Chuck Lorre & Mark Roberts; Teleplay by : Lee Aronsohn & Don Foster & Jim Patterson	January 19, 2009	3T7413	16.09
129	14	"David Copperfield Slipped Me a Roofie"	Jeff Melman	Story by : Mark Roberts; Teleplay by : Don Foster & Jim Patterson	February 2, 2009	3T7414	16.55
130	15	"I'd Like to Start with the Cat"	Jeff Melman	Story by : Chuck Lorre; Teleplay by : Mark Roberts & Don Foster & Susan Beavers	February 9, 2009	3T7415	15.00
131	16	"She'll Still Be Dead at Halftime"	Jeff Melman	Story by : Mark Roberts; Teleplay by : Don Foster & Eddie Gorodetsky	March 2, 2009	3T7416	15.47
132	17	"The 'Ocu' or the 'Pado'?"	James Widdoes	Story by : Susan Beavers & Jim Patterson; Teleplay by : Mark Roberts & Don Foster	March 9, 2009	3T7417	13.44
133	18	"My Son's Enormous Head"	James Widdoes	Story by : Lee Aronsohn & Jim Patterson; Teleplay by : Susan Beavers & Eddie Gorodetsky	March 16, 2009	3T7418	14.12
134	19	"The Two Finger Rule"	James Widdoes	Story by : Chuck Lorre & Lee Aronsohn; Teleplay by : Susan Beavers & Eddie Gorodetsky & Jim Patterson	March 30, 2009	3T7419	14.56
135	20	"Hello, I am Alan Cousteau"	James Widdoes	Story by : Chuck Lorre & Mark Roberts; Teleplay by : Lee Aronsohn & Susan Beavers & Eddie Gorodetsky	April 13, 2009	3T7420	15.03
136	21	"Above Exalted Cyclops"	James Widdoes	Story by : Chuck Lorre & Lee Aronsohn; Teleplay by : Don Foster & Eddie Gorodetsky	April 27, 2009	3T7421	14.16
137	22	"Sir Lancelot's Litter Box"	Jon Cryer	Story by : Chuck Lorre & Lee Aronsohn & Don Foster; Teleplay by : Susan Beavers & Eddie Gorodetsky & Jim Patterson	May 4, 2009	3T7422	14.17
138	23	"Good Morning, Mrs. Butterworth"	Mark Roberts	Story by : Don Foster & Sid Youngers; Teleplay by : Mark Roberts & Eddie Gorodetsky	May 11, 2009	3T7424	13.11
139	24	"Baseball Was Better with Steroids"	Lee Aronsohn	Story by : Mark Roberts & Susan Beavers; Teleplay by : Chuck Lorre & Lee Aronsohn	May 18, 2009	3T7423	16.18

=== Season 7 (2009–10) ===
No. overall	No. in season	Title	Directed by	Written by	Original release date	Prod. code	U.S. viewers (millions)
140	1	"818-jklpuzo"	James Widdoes	Story by : Chuck Lorre & Lee Aronsohn & Mark Roberts; Teleplay by : Eddie Gorodetsky & Don Foster & Susan Beavers	September 21, 2009	3X5501	13.63
141	2	"Whipped Unto the Third Generation"	James Widdoes	Mark Roberts	September 28, 2009	3X5502	13.86
142	3	"Mmm, Fish. Yum."	James Widdoes	Story by : Chuck Lorre & Lee Aronsohn & Don Foster; Teleplay by : Eddie Gorodetsky & Susan Beavers & Jim Patterson	October 5, 2009	3X5503	13.30
143	4	"Laxative Tester, Horse Inseminator"	James Widdoes	Story by : Susan Beavers & Eddie Gorodetsky; Teleplay by : Chuck Lorre & Lee Aronsohn & Mark Roberts	October 12, 2009	3X5504	14.17
144	5	"For the Sake of the Child"	James Widdoes	Story by : Chuck Lorre & Lee Aronsohn & Mark Roberts; Teleplay by : Don Foster & Jim Patterson	October 19, 2009	3X5506	14.07
145	6	"Give Me Your Thumb"	James Widdoes	Story by : Chuck Lorre & Mark Roberts; Teleplay by : David Richardson	November 2, 2009	3X5505	13.51
146	7	"Untainted by Filth"	James Widdoes	Story by : Chuck Lorre & Lee Aronsohn & Don Foster; Teleplay by : Eddie Gorodetsky & Susan Beavers & Jim Patterson	November 9, 2009	3X5507	14.44
147	8	"Gorp. Fnark. Schmegle."	James Widdoes	Story by : Chuck Lorre & Lee Aronsohn & Mark Roberts; Teleplay by : Don Foster & Eddie Gorodetsky & Susan Beavers & Jim Patterson	November 16, 2009	3X5508	13.69
148	9	"Captain Terry's Spray-On Hair"	James Widdoes	Story by : Don Foster & Eddie Gorodetsky & Susan Beavers & Jim Patterson; Teleplay by : Chuck Lorre & Lee Aronsohn & Mark Roberts	November 23, 2009	3X5509	13.88
149	10	"That's Why They Call It Ball Room"	James Widdoes	Story by : Chuck Lorre & Jim Patterson; Teleplay by : Lee Aronsohn & Mark Roberts & Don Foster & Eddie Gorodetsky	December 7, 2009	3X5510	14.84
150	11	"Warning, It's Dirty"	James Widdoes	Story by : Chuck Lorre & Mark Roberts; Teleplay by : Lee Aronsohn & Eddie Gorodetsky & Don Foster	December 14, 2009	3X5511	16.37
151	12	"Fart Jokes, Pie and Celeste"	James Widdoes	Story by : Chuck Lorre & Lee Aronsohn & Mark Roberts & Don Foster; Teleplay by : Susan Beavers & Eddie Gorodetsky & Jim Patterson & David Richardson	January 11, 2010	3X5512	17.27
152	13	"Yay, No Polyps!"	James Widdoes	Story by : Chuck Lorre & Lee Aronsohn; Teleplay by : Mark Roberts & Don Foster & Jim Patterson	January 18, 2010	3X5513	16.31
153	14	"Crude and Uncalled For"	James Widdoes	Story by : Chuck Lorre & Lee Aronsohn; Teleplay by : Mark Roberts & Don Foster & Eddie Gorodetsky	February 1, 2010	3X5514	16.51
154	15	"Aye, Aye, Captain Douche"	James Widdoes	Story by : Chuck Lorre & Lee Aronsohn & Susan Beavers; Teleplay by : Mark Roberts & Don Foster & Jim Patterson	February 8, 2010	3X5515	17.66
155	16	"Tinkle Like a Princess"	James Widdoes	Story by : Chuck Lorre & Lee Aronsohn; Teleplay by : Mark Roberts & Don Foster & Jim Patterson	March 1, 2010	3X5516	16.86
156	17	"I Found Your Moustache"	James Widdoes	Story by : Chuck Lorre & Lee Aronsohn & Mark Roberts; Teleplay by : Don Foster & Eddie Gorodetsky & Jim Patterson	March 8, 2010	3X5517	17.61
157	18	"Ixnay on the Oggie Day"	James Widdoes	Story by : Don Foster & Eddie Gorodetsky & Jim Patterson; Teleplay by : Chuck Lorre & Lee Aronsohn & Mark Roberts	March 22, 2010	3X5518	14.46
158	19	"Keith Moon is Vomiting in His Grave"	James Widdoes	Story by : Mark Roberts & Don Foster; Teleplay by : Eddie Gorodetsky & Jim Patterson	April 12, 2010	3X5519	13.71
159	20	"I Called Him Magoo"	James Widdoes	Story by : Chuck Lorre & Lee Aronsohn; Teleplay by : Mark Roberts & Don Foster & Susan Beavers	May 10, 2010	3X5520	13.86
160	21	"Gumby with a Pokey"	James Widdoes	Story by : Chuck Lorre & Lee Aronsohn & Susan Beavers & David Richardson; Teleplay by : Mark Roberts & Don Foster & Eddie Gorodetsky & Jim Patterson	May 17, 2010	3X5521	13.28
161	22	"This is Not Gonna End Well"	Lee Aronsohn	Story by : Chuck Lorre & Lee Aronsohn & Mark Roberts & Don Foster; Teleplay by : Eddie Gorodetsky & Susan Beavers & Jim Patterson & David Richardson	May 24, 2010	3X5522	15.46

=== Season 8 (2010–11) ===
No. overall	No. in season	Title	Directed by	Written by	Original release date	Prod. code	U.S. viewers (millions)
162	1	"Three Girls and a Guy Named Bud"	James Widdoes	Story by : Chuck Lorre & Lee Aronsohn; Teleplay by : Don Foster & Jim Patterson & Eddie Gorodetsky	September 20, 2010	3X6451	14.63
163	2	"A Bottle of Wine and a Jackhammer"	James Widdoes	Story by : Chuck Lorre & Lee Aronsohn & Susan Beavers; Teleplay by : Don Foster & Eddie Gorodetsky & Jim Patterson	September 27, 2010	3X6452	13.92
164	3	"A Pudding-Filled Cactus"	James Widdoes	Story by : Chuck Lorre & Lee Aronsohn & David Richardson; Teleplay by : Don Foster & Eddie Gorodetsky & Susan Beavers	October 4, 2010	3X6453	14.37
165	4	"Hookers, Hookers, Hookers"	James Widdoes	Story by : Don Foster & Eddie Gorodetsky & Susan Beavers; Teleplay by : Chuck Lorre & Lee Aronsohn & Jim Patterson	October 11, 2010	3X6454	13.47
166	5	"The Immortal Mr. Billy Joel"	James Widdoes	Story by : Chuck Lorre & Lee Aronsohn & Don Foster; Teleplay by : Eddie Gorodetsky & Susan Beavers & Jim Patterson	October 18, 2010	3X6455	13.54
167	6	"Twanging Your Magic Clanger"	James Widdoes	Story by : Lee Aronsohn & Don Foster; Teleplay by : Chuck Lorre & Eddie Gorodetsky & Jim Patterson	October 25, 2010	3X6456	13.77
168	7	"The Crazy Bitch Gazette"	James Widdoes	Story by : Chuck Lorre & Lee Aronsohn; Teleplay by : Don Foster & Eddie Gorodetsky & Jim Patterson	November 1, 2010	3X6457	13.64
169	8	"Springtime on a Stick"	James Widdoes	Eddie Gorodetsky & Jim Patterson	November 8, 2010	3X6458	13.63
170	9	"A Good Time in Central Africa"	James Widdoes	Story by : Don Reo; Teleplay by : Eddie Gorodetsky & Jim Patterson	November 15, 2010	3X6459	14.25
171	10	"Ow, Ow, Don't Stop"	James Widdoes	Story by : Chuck Lorre & Lee Aronsohn; Teleplay by : Susan Beavers & Don Reo & David Richardson	November 22, 2010	3X6460	14.39
172	11	"Dead from the Waist Down"	James Widdoes	Story by : Susan Beavers & David Richardson & Don Reo; Teleplay by : Chuck Lorre & Lee Aronsohn	December 6, 2010	3X6461	13.41
173	12	"Chocolate Diddlers or My Puppy's Dead"	James Widdoes	Story by : Chuck Lorre; Teleplay by : Eddie Gorodetsky & Jim Patterson	December 13, 2010	3X6462	13.95
174	13	"Skunk, Dog, Crap and Ketchup"	James Widdoes	Story by : Alissa Neubauer; Teleplay by : Chuck Lorre & Lee Aronsohn & Don Reo & David Richardson	January 3, 2011	3X6463	15.36
175	14	"Lookin' for Japanese Subs"	James Widdoes	Story by : Chuck Lorre & Lee Aronsohn; Teleplay by : Eddie Gorodetsky & Susan Beavers & Jim Patterson	January 17, 2011	3X6464	15.56
176	15	"Three Hookers and a Philly Cheesesteak"	James Widdoes	Eddie Gorodetsky & Jim Patterson	February 7, 2011	3X6465	15.15
177	16	"That Darn Priest"	James Widdoes	Story by : Chuck Lorre & Lee Aronsohn; Teleplay by : Susan Beavers & David Richardson & Don Reo	February 14, 2011	3X6466	14.51

=== Season 9 (2011–12) ===
No. overall	No. in season	Title	Directed by	Written by	Original release date	Prod. code	U.S. viewers (millions)
178	1	"Nice to Meet You, Walden Schmidt"	James Widdoes	Chuck Lorre & Lee Aronsohn & Eddie Gorodetsky & Jim Patterson	September 19, 2011	3X6951	28.74
179	2	"People Who Love Peepholes"	James Widdoes	Chuck Lorre & Lee Aronsohn & Eddie Gorodetsky & Jim Patterson	September 26, 2011	3X6952	20.52
180	3	"Big Girls Don't Throw Food"	James Widdoes	Story by : Chuck Lorre & Andrew J. B. Aronsohn; Teleplay by : Eddie Gorodetsky & Jim Patterson	October 3, 2011	3X6953	17.71
181	4	"Nine Magic Fingers"	James Widdoes	Story by : Eddie Gorodetsky & Jim Patterson; Teleplay by : Chuck Lorre & Lee Aronsohn	October 10, 2011	3X6954	16.20
182	5	"A Giant Cat Holding a Churro"	James Widdoes	Story by : Chuck Lorre & Lee Aronsohn & Eddie Gorodetsky & Jim Patterson; Teleplay by : Susan Beavers & Don Reo & David Richardson	October 17, 2011	3X6955	15.14
183	6	"The Squat and the Hover"	James Widdoes	Story by : Chuck Lorre & Lee Aronsohn & Eddie Gorodetsky & Jim Patterson; Teleplay by : Susan Beavers & Don Reo & David Richardson	October 24, 2011	3X6956	15.29
184	7	"Those Fancy Japanese Toilets"	James Widdoes	Story by : Chuck Lorre & Lee Aronsohn; Teleplay by : Eddie Gorodetsky & Jim Patterson	October 31, 2011	3X6957	13.90
185	8	"Thank You for the Intercourse"	James Widdoes	Story by : Chuck Lorre & Susan McMartin; Teleplay by : Lee Aronsohn & Eddie Gorodetsky & Jim Patterson	November 7, 2011	3X6958	14.71
186	9	"Frodo's Headshots"	James Widdoes	Story by : Chuck Lorre & Lee Aronsohn; Teleplay by : Susan Beavers & Don Reo & David Richardson	November 14, 2011	3X6959	14.77
187	10	"A Fishbowl Full of Glass Eyes"	James Widdoes	Story by : Chuck Lorre & Gemma Baker; Teleplay by : Lee Aronsohn & Eddie Gorodetsky & Jim Patterson	November 21, 2011	3X6960	15.82
188	11	"What a Lovely Landing Strip"	James Widdoes	Story by : Chuck Lorre & Lee Aronsohn; Teleplay by : Eddie Gorodetsky & Jim Patterson & Don Reo	December 5, 2011	3X6961	15.18
189	12	"One False Move, Zimbabwe!"	James Widdoes	Story by : Chuck Lorre & Lee Aronsohn; Teleplay by : Jim Patterson & Eddie Gorodetsky & Don Reo	December 12, 2011	3X6962	14.88
190	13	"Slowly and in a Circular Fashion"	James Widdoes	Story by : Chuck Lorre & Ashton Kutcher; Teleplay by : Lee Aronsohn & Eddie Gorodetsky & Jim Patterson	January 2, 2012	3X6963	13.94
191	14	"A Possum on Chemo"	James Widdoes	Story by : Susan Beavers & Susan McMartin; Teleplay by : Chuck Lorre & Eddie Gorodetsky & Jim Patterson	January 16, 2012	3X6964	13.02
192	15	"The Duchess of Dull-in-Sack"	James Widdoes	Story by : Chuck Lorre & Lee Aronsohn; Teleplay by : Eddie Gorodetsky & Jim Patterson & Don Reo	February 6, 2012	3X6965	13.00
193	16	"Sips, Sonnets and Sodomy"	James Widdoes	Story by : Eddie Gorodetsky & Jim Patterson & Don Reo; Teleplay by : Chuck Lorre & Lee Aronsohn	February 13, 2012	3X6966	12.45
194	17	"Not in My Mouth!"	James Widdoes	Story by : Eddie Gorodetsky & Jim Patterson & Don Reo; Teleplay by : Chuck Lorre & Lee Aronsohn	February 20, 2012	3X6967	13.33
195	18	"The War Against Gingivitis"	James Widdoes	Story by : Chuck Lorre & Lee Aronsohn; Teleplay by : Eddie Gorodetsky & Jim Patterson & Don Reo	February 27, 2012	3X6968	11.92
196	19	"Palmdale, Ech"	James Widdoes	Story by : Chuck Lorre & Lee Aronsohn; Teleplay by : Eddie Gorodetsky & Jim Patterson & Don Reo	March 19, 2012	3X6969	11.47
197	20	"Grandma's Pie"	James Widdoes	Story by : Eddie Gorodetsky & Jim Patterson & Don Reo; Teleplay by : Chuck Lorre & Lee Aronsohn	April 9, 2012	3X6970	10.40
198	21	"Mr. Hose Says 'Yes'"	James Widdoes	Story by : Lee Aronsohn & Susan Beavers; Teleplay by : Chuck Lorre & Eddie Gorodetsky & Jim Patterson & Don Reo	April 16, 2012	3X6971	11.22
199	22	"Why We Gave Up Women"	James Widdoes	Story by : Chuck Lorre & Lee Aronsohn; Teleplay by : Eddie Gorodetsky & Jim Patterson & Don Reo	April 30, 2012	3X6972	11.32
200	23	"The Straw in My Donut Hole"	James Widdoes	Story by : Eddie Gorodetsky & Jim Patterson & Don Reo; Teleplay by : Chuck Lorre & Lee Aronsohn & Susan Beavers	May 7, 2012	3X6973	11.43
201	24	"Oh Look! Al-Qaeda!"	James Widdoes	Story by : Chuck Lorre & Lee Aronsohn; Teleplay by : Eddie Gorodetsky & Jim Patterson & Don Reo	May 14, 2012	3X6974	11.55

=== Season 10 (2012–13) ===
No. overall	No. in season	Title	Directed by	Written by	Original release date	Prod. code	U.S. viewers (millions)
202	1	"I Changed My Mind About the Milk"	James Widdoes	Story by : Chuck Lorre & Eddie Gorodetsky; Teleplay by : Don Reo & Jim Patterson	September 27, 2012	3X7401	12.54
203	2	"A Big Bag of Dog"	James Widdoes	Story by : Chuck Lorre & Don Reo; Teleplay by : Jim Patterson & Eddie Gorodetsky	October 4, 2012	3X7403	12.33
204	3	"Four Balls, Two Bats and One Mitt"	James Widdoes	Story by : Don Reo & Jim Patterson; Teleplay by : Chuck Lorre & Eddie Gorodetsky	October 11, 2012	3X7402	11.35
205	4	"You Do Know What the Lollipop's For"	James Widdoes	Story by : Chuck Lorre & Alissa Neubauer; Teleplay by : Don Reo & Jim Patterson & Eddie Gorodetsky	October 18, 2012	3X7404	13.60
206	5	"That's Not What They Call It in Amsterdam"	James Widdoes	Story by : Eddie Gorodetsky & Susan McMartin; Teleplay by : Chuck Lorre & Don Reo & Jim Patterson	October 25, 2012	3X7405	12.94
207	6	"Ferrets, Attack!"	James Widdoes	Story by : Chuck Lorre & Don Reo; Teleplay by : Jim Patterson & Eddie Gorodetsky & Matt Ross & Max Searle	November 1, 2012	3X7406	12.65
208	7	"Avoid the Chinese Mustard"	James Widdoes	Story by : Chuck Lorre & Gemma Baker; Teleplay by : Don Reo & Jim Patterson & Eddie Gorodetsky	November 8, 2012	3X7407	14.07
209	8	"Something My Gynecologist Said"	James Widdoes	Story by : Chuck Lorre & Jim Patterson; Teleplay by : Don Reo & Eddie Gorodetsky	November 15, 2012	3X7408	13.87
210	9	"I Scream When I Pee"	James Widdoes	Story by : Chuck Lorre & Don Reo; Teleplay by : Jim Patterson & Eddie Gorodetsky & Steve Tompkins	November 29, 2012	3X7409	13.74
211	10	"One Nut Johnson"	James Widdoes	Story by : Don Reo & Jim Patterson & Eddie Gorodetsky; Teleplay by : Chuck Lorre & Steve Tompkins & Alissa Neubauer	December 6, 2012	3X7410	13.50
212	11	"Give Santa a Tail-Hole"	James Widdoes	Story by : Chuck Lorre & Matt Ross & Max Searle; Teleplay by : Don Reo & Jim Patterson & Eddie Gorodetsky	December 13, 2012	3X7411	13.35
213	12	"Welcome to Alancrest"	James Widdoes	Story by : Chuck Lorre & Don Reo & Steve Tompkins; Teleplay by : Jim Patterson & Eddie Gorodetsky & Susan McMartin	January 3, 2013	3X7412	15.41
214	13	"Grab a Feather and Get in Line"	James Widdoes	Story by : Chuck Lorre & Eddie Gorodetsky & Gemma Baker; Teleplay by : Don Reo & Jim Patterson & Alissa Neubauer	January 10, 2013	3X7413	14.40
215	14	"Run, Steven Staven! Run!"	James Widdoes	Story by : Chuck Lorre & Jim Patterson & Susan McMartin; Teleplay by : Don Reo & Eddie Gorodetsky & Steve Tompkins	January 31, 2013	3X7414	13.70
216	15	"Paint It, Pierce It or Plug It"	James Widdoes	Story by : Chuck Lorre & Don Reo & Eddie Gorodetsky; Teleplay by : Jim Patterson & Matt Ross & Max Searle	February 7, 2013	3X7415	14.12
217	16	"Advantage: Fat, Flying Baby"	James Widdoes	Story by : Chuck Lorre & Eddie Gorodetsky & Alissa Neubauer; Teleplay by : Jim Patterson & Don Reo & Steve Tompkins	February 14, 2013	3X7416	13.69
218	17	"Throgwarten Middle School Mysteries"	James Widdoes	Story by : Chuck Lorre & Jim Patterson & Nick Bakay; Teleplay by : Don Reo & Eddie Gorodetsky & Gemma Baker	February 21, 2013	3X7417	13.41
219	18	"The 9:04 from Pemberton"	James Widdoes	Story by : Chuck Lorre & Jim Patterson & Eddie Gorodetsky; Teleplay by : Don Reo & Steve Tompkins & Alissa Neubauer	March 7, 2013	3X7418	13.54
220	19	"Big Episode. Someone Stole a Spoon"	James Widdoes	Story by : Chuck Lorre & Don Reo & Gemma Baker; Teleplay by : Jim Patterson & Eddie Gorodetsky & Susan McMartin	March 14, 2013	3X7419	12.18
221	20	"Bazinga! That's from a TV Show"	James Widdoes	Story by : Chuck Lorre & Jim Patterson & Eddie Gorodetsky; Teleplay by : Don Reo & Matt Ross & Max Searle	April 4, 2013	3X7420	13.71
222	21	"Another Night with Neil Diamond"	James Widdoes	Story by : Chuck Lorre & Don Reo & Steve Tompkins; Teleplay by : Jim Patterson & Eddie Gorodetsky & Nick Bakay	April 25, 2013	3X7421	11.32
223	22	"My Bodacious Vidalia"	James Widdoes	Story by : Chuck Lorre & Don Reo & Jim Patterson & Eddie Gorodetsky; Teleplay by : Gemma Baker & Matt Ross & Max Searle	May 2, 2013	3X7422	12.12
224	23	"Cows, Prepare to Be Tipped"	James Widdoes	Story by : Chuck Lorre & Alissa Neubauer & Susan McMartin; Teleplay by : Don Reo & Jim Patterson & Eddie Gorodetsky	May 9, 2013	3X7423	12.83

=== Season 11 (2013–14) ===
No. overall	No. in season	Title	Directed by	Written by	Original release date	Prod. code	U.S. viewers (millions)
225	1	"Nangnangnangnang"	James Widdoes	Story by : Chuck Lorre & Susan McMartin; Teleplay by : Don Reo & Jim Patterson & Steve Tompkins	September 26, 2013	4X5351	11.59
226	2	"I Think I Banged Lucille Ball"	James Widdoes	Story by : Chuck Lorre & Alissa Neubauer; Teleplay by : Don Reo & Jim Patterson & Jeff Lowell	October 3, 2013	4X5352	9.34
227	3	"This Unblessed Biscuit"	James Widdoes	Story by : Chuck Lorre & Jim Patterson; Teleplay by : Don Reo & Matt Ross & Max Searle	October 10, 2013	4X5353	9.14
228	4	"Clank, Clank, Drunken Skank"	James Widdoes	Story by : Chuck Lorre & Susan McMartin; Teleplay by : Jim Patterson & Don Reo & Steve Tompkins	October 17, 2013	4X5354	8.59
229	5	"Alan Harper, Pleasing Women Since 2003"	James Widdoes	Story by : Steve Tompkins & Alissa Neubauer & Don Reo; Teleplay by : Jim Patterson & Jeff Lowell & Jim Vallely	October 24, 2013	4X5355	8.53
230	6	"Justice in Star-Spangled Hot Pants"	James Widdoes	Story by : Don Reo & Susan McMartin & Jon Cryer; Teleplay by : Jim Patterson & Tim Kelleher & Jeff Lowell	November 7, 2013	4X5356	8.27
231	7	"Some Kind of Lesbian Zombie"	James Widdoes	Story by : Jim Patterson & Steve Tompkins & Jeff Lowell; Teleplay by : Don Reo & Matt Ross & Max Searle	November 14, 2013	4X5357	8.66
232	8	"Mr. Walden, He Die. I Clean Room."	James Widdoes	Story by : Chuck Lorre & Jim Patterson & Steve Tompkins; Teleplay by : Don Reo & Susan McMartin & Saladin K. Patterson	November 21, 2013	4X5359	8.69
233	9	"Numero Uno Accidente Lawyer"	James Widdoes	Story by : Don Reo & Tim Kelleher & Nathan Chetty; Teleplay by : Jim Patterson & Saladin K. Patterson & Jim Valley	December 5, 2013	4X5358	8.47
234	10	"On Vodka, on Soda, on Blender, on Mixer!"	James Widdoes	Story by : Don Reo & Jim Patterson & Jeff Lowell; Teleplay by : Saladin K. Patterson & Matt Ross & Max Searle	December 12, 2013	4X5360	8.54
235	11	"Tazed in the Lady Nuts"	James Widdoes	Story by : Tim Kelleher & Jeff Lowell & Jim Vallely; Teleplay by : Don Reo & Jim Patterson & Steve Tompkins	January 2, 2014	4X5361	8.74
236	12	"Baseball. Boobs. Boobs. Baseball."	James Widdoes	Story by : Don Reo & Susan McMartin & Leslie Shapira; Teleplay by : Jim Patterson & Matt Ross & Max Searle	January 9, 2014	4X5362	9.58
237	13	"Bite Me, Supreme Court"	James Widdoes	Story by : Tim Kelleher & Jeff Lowell & Jim Vallely; Teleplay by : Don Reo & Jim Patterson & Steve Tompkins	January 30, 2014	4X5363	8.86
238	14	"Three Fingers of Crème de Menthe"	James Widdoes	Story by : Don Reo & Jim Patterson & Maria Espada Pearce; Teleplay by : Steve Tompkins & Saladin K. Patterson & Susan McMartin	February 6, 2014	4X5364	8.32
239	15	"Cab Fare and a Bottle of Penicillin"	James Widdoes	Story by : Jim Patterson & Tim Kelleher & Jim Vallely; Teleplay by : Don Reo & Matt Ross & Max Searle	February 27, 2014	4X5365	10.02
240	16	"How to Get Rid of Alan Harper"	James Widdoes	Story by : Saladin K. Patterson & Jim Vallely & Leslie Schapira; Teleplay by : Don Reo & Jim Patterson & Jeff Lowell	March 6, 2014	4X5366	10.38
241	17	"Welcome Home, Jake"	James Widdoes	Story by : Don Reo & Jim Patterson & Saladin K. Patterson; Teleplay by : Tim Kelleher & Matt Ross & Max Searle	March 13, 2014	4X5367	9.43
242	18	"West Side Story"	James Widdoes	Story by : Don Reo & Jim Patterson & Susan McMartin; Teleplay by : Jeff Lowell & Matt Ross & Max Searle	April 3, 2014	4X5368	9.23
243	19	"Lan Mao Shi Zai Wuding Shang"	James Widdoes	Story by : Jeff Lowell & Matt Ross & Max Searle; Teleplay by : Don Reo & Jim Patterson & Steve Tompkins	April 10, 2014	4X5369	9.55
244	20	"Lotta Delis in Little Armenia"	James Widdoes	Story by : Don Reo & Steve Tompkins & Saladin K. Patterson; Teleplay by : Jim Patterson & Tim Kelleher & Jim Vallely	April 24, 2014	4X5370	9.35
245	21	"Dial 1-900-MIX-A-LOT"	James Widdoes	Story by : Jim Patterson & Matt Ross & Max Searle; Teleplay by : Don Reo & Steve Tompkins & Susan McMartin	May 1, 2014	4X5371	8.97
246	22	"Oh WALD-E, Good Times Ahead"	James Widdoes	Story by : Don Reo & Jim Patterson & Tim Kelleher & Jim Vallely; Teleplay by : Steve Tompkins & Jeff Lowell & Matt Ross & Max Searle	May 8, 2014	4X5372	8.35

=== Season 12 (2014–15) ===
No. overall	No. in season	Title	Directed by	Written by	Original release date	Prod. code	U.S. viewers (millions)
247	1	"The Ol' Mexican Spinach"	James Widdoes	Story by : Chuck Lorre & Lee Aronsohn & Warren Bell; Teleplay by : Don Reo & Jim Patterson & Steve Tompkins	October 30, 2014	T12.14951	10.29
248	2	"A Chic Bar in Ibiza"	James Widdoes	Story by : Lee Aronsohn & Don Reo & Jim Patterson; Teleplay by : Tim Kelleher & Saladin K. Patterson & Jim Vallely	November 6, 2014	T12.14952	9.12
249	3	"Glamping in a Yurt"	James Widdoes	Story by : Saladin K. Patterson & Matt Ross & Max Searle; Teleplay by : Don Reo & Jim Patterson & Jim Vallely	November 13, 2014	T12.14954	8.75
250	4	"Thirty-Eight, Sixty-Two, Thirty-Eight"	James Widdoes	Story by : Don Reo & Jim Patterson & Steve Tompkins; Teleplay by : Warren Bell & Matt Ross & Max Searle	November 20, 2014	T12.14953	8.62
251	5	"Oontz. Oontz. Oontz."	James Widdoes	Story by : Don Reo & Steve Tompkins & Warren Bell; Teleplay by : Jim Patterson & Tim Kelleher & Saladin K. Patterson	November 27, 2014	T12.14955	6.93
252	6	"Alan Shot a Little Girl"	Jon Cryer	Story by : Don Reo & Maria Espada Pearce & Nathan Chetty; Teleplay by : Jim Patterson & Steve Tompkins & Warren Bell	December 4, 2014	T12.14957	8.10
253	7	"Sex with an Animated Ed Asner"	James Widdoes	Story by : Jim Patterson & Jim Vallely & Tim Kelleher; Teleplay by : Don Reo & Matt Ross & Max Searle	December 11, 2014	T12.14956	9.30
254	8	"Family, Bublé, Deep-Fried Turkey"	James Widdoes	Story by : Warren Bell, Saladin K. Patterson, & Jim Vallely; Teleplay by : Don Reo, Jim Patterson, & Steve Thompkins	December 18, 2014	T12.14959	8.80
255	9	"Bouncy, Bouncy, Bouncy, Lyndsey"	James Widdoes	Story by : Jim Patterson, Tim Kelleher, & Saladin K. Patterson; Teleplay by : Don Reo, Matt Ross, & Max Searle	January 8, 2015	T12.14958	10.07
256	10	"Here I Come, Pants!"	James Widdoes	Story by : Chuck Lorre, Don Reo, & Jim Patterson; Teleplay by : Tim Kelleher, Matt Ross, & Max Searle	January 15, 2015	T12.14960	9.38
257	11	"For Whom the Booty Calls"	James Widdoes	Story by : Warren Bell, Saladin K. Patterson, & Jim Vallely; Teleplay by : Don Reo, Jim Patterson, & Steve Tompkins	January 22, 2015	T12.14961	9.31
258	12	"A Beer-Battered Rip-Off"	James Widdoes	Story by : Don Reo, Jim Patterson, & Jeff Lowell; Teleplay by : Matt Ross, Max Searle, & Nathan Chetty	January 29, 2015	T12.14962	9.71
259	13	"Boompa Loved His Hookers"	James Widdoes	Story by : Steve Tompkins, Warren Bell & Jeff Lowell; Teleplay by : Don Reo, Jim Patterson & Nathan Chetty	February 5, 2015	T12.14963	9.39
260	14	"Don't Give a Monkey a Gun"	James Widdoes	Story by : Don Reo, Jim Patterson & Tim Kelleher; Teleplay by : Jim Vallely, Matt Ross & Max Searle	February 12, 2015	T12.14964	9.33
261	15	"Of Course He's Dead"	James Widdoes	Chuck Lorre, Lee Aronsohn, Don Reo & Jim Patterson	February 19, 2015	T12.14965	13.52
262	16	"Of Course He's Dead"	James Widdoes	Chuck Lorre, Lee Aronsohn, Don Reo & Jim Patterson	February 19, 2015	T12.14966	13.52

== Viewing figures ==
=== Seasons 1–3 ===
Two and a Half Men : U.S. viewers per episode (millions)

Season	Episode number																							
Season	1	2	3	4	5	6	7	8	9	10	11	12	13	14	15	16	17	18	19	20	21	22	23	24
1	18.44	16.18	14.82	14.73	15.24	15.82	16.02	15.82	15.98	17.14	14.77	16.75	17.86	16.48	16.96	17.39	16.48	17.10	16.43	14.58	16.20	16.01	15.20	18.16
2	16.44	16.60	16.43	17.15	16.28	17.25	16.04	17.47	18.94	17.88	16.22	18.03	18.14	17.01	16.75	16.78	17.50	17.45	15.92	17.13	17.93	17.96	24.24	14.37
3	15.04	14.37	14.21	15.24	15.56	16.77	16.19	15.17	15.75	16.53	17.71	17.20	17.07	16.33	17.04	17.06	17.37	16.72	14.05	14.47	14.31	14.87	11.04	15.51

Audience measurement performed by Nielsen Media Research

=== Seasons 4–6 ===
Two and a Half Men : U.S. viewers per episode (millions)

Season	Episode number																							
Season	1	2	3	4	5	6	7	8	9	10	11	12	13	14	15	16	17	18	19	20	21	22	23	24
4	15.04	15.28	15.80	16.38	16.25	15.03	14.48	15.83	15.04	15.50	15.69	14.78	15.85	17.68	15.50	16.56	16.58	11.68	13.46	13.03	12.27	13.71	13.27	10.16
5	13.58	13.24	13.02	13.69	13.94	13.73	13.80	14.12	13.92	15.26	14.06	14.23	14.50	13.94	13.36	12.91	13.61	13.82	14.70	–				
6	14.88	13.58	14.07	14.72	14.63	12.76	14.50	15.18	14.95	15.59	17.92	17.10	16.09	16.55	15.00	15.47	13.44	14.12	14.56	15.03	14.16	14.17	13.11	16.18

Audience measurement performed by Nielsen Media Research

=== Seasons 7–9 ===
Two and a Half Men : U.S. viewers per episode (millions)

Season	Episode number																							
Season	1	2	3	4	5	6	7	8	9	10	11	12	13	14	15	16	17	18	19	20	21	22	23	24
7	13.63	13.86	13.07	14.17	14.07	13.51	14.44	13.69	13.91	14.84	16.37	17.27	16.20	16.51	17.16	16.86	17.61	14.46	13.71	13.86	13.28	15.46	–	
8	14.63	13.92	14.37	13.47	13.54	13.77	13.64	13.63	14.25	14.39	13.41	13.45	15.36	15.56	15.15	14.51	–							
9	28.74	20.52	17.71	16.20	15.14	15.29	13.90	14.71	14.77	15.82	15.18	14.88	13.94	13.02	13.00	12.45	13.33	11.92	11.47	10.40	11.22	11.32	11.43	11.55

Audience measurement performed by Nielsen Media Research

=== Seasons 10–12 ===
Two and a Half Men : U.S. viewers per episode (millions)

Season	Episode number																						
Season	1	2	3	4	5	6	7	8	9	10	11	12	13	14	15	16	17	18	19	20	21	22	23
10	12.54	12.33	11.35	13.60	12.94	12.65	14.07	13.87	13.74	13.50	13.35	15.41	14.40	13.70	14.12	13.69	13.41	13.54	12.18	13.71	11.32	12.12	12.83
11	11.59	9.34	9.14	8.59	8.53	8.27	8.66	8.69	8.47	8.54	8.74	9.58	8.86	8.32	10.02	10.38	9.43	9.23	9.55	9.35	8.97	8.35	–
12	10.29	9.12	8.75	8.62	6.93	8.10	9.30	8.80	10.07	9.38	9.31	9.71	9.39	9.33	13.52	13.52	–						

Audience measurement performed by Nielsen Media Research
