= Jennifer Taylor (actress) =

American actress (born 1972)

- Born: Jennifer Bini; April 19, 1972 (age 54); Hoboken, New Jersey, U.S.
- Occupation: Actress
- Years active: 1998–present
- Known for: Two and a Half Men; Wild Things
- Spouse: Paul Taylor
- Children: 2

Jennifer Taylor (née Bini; born April 19, 1972) is an American actress, sometimes credited as Jennifer Bini Taylor, best known for her role as Chelsea on the CBS sitcom Two and a Half Men, and earlier for three other roles on the show. She appeared in the erotic thriller Wild Things and the faith-based film God's Not Dead: A Light in Darkness.

== Early life ==
Taylor is of Italian descent. She was born in Hoboken, New Jersey, but moved to Coral Springs, Florida when she was ten. She was third runner-up in the 1995 Miss Florida USA pageant and first runner-up for 1996.

== Personal life ==
She lives in Los Angeles with her husband Paul Taylor and their two children. She has a BA in social sciences and, according to an interview, grows much of her family's food in her own garden.

== Filmography ==
=== Film ===
Year	Title	Role	Notes
1998	Wild Things	Barbara Baxter	
1998	The Waterboy	Rita	
2005	Rumor Has It	Jocelyn Richelieu	
2012	100,000 Zombie Heads	Zuhara	
2013	Ashley	Stacy Collins	
2014	Like a Country Song	Mia Reeson	
2015	A Date to Die For	Rachel Edwards	
2015	Street Level	Samantha	
2016	A Life Lived	Jane	
2016	Emma's Chance	Miranda Bailey	
2016	Fair Haven	Ruby	
2016	Arlo: The Burping Pig	Ilana	
2016	Stalked by my Mother	Claire Beauregard	
2018	God's Not Dead: A Light in Darkness	Meg Harvey	
2021	Hostage House	Susan	
2022	Christmas on Repeat	Andrea	
2024	Holiday for Hire	Mary	

=== Television ===
Year	Title	Role	Notes
1998	Miami Sands	Laura	TV series
1998	Maximum Bob	Gail Tyrone	Episode: "Once Bitten..."
2000	Pacific Blue	Patti Wolfson	Episode: "Disrobed"
2000	Diagnosis: Murder	Charmaine DuFour	Episode: "Two Birds with One Sloan"
2000	The Disciples	Kimiko	Television film
2000	Arliss	Roberta Takega	Episode: "Where There's a Will..."
2000	Yes, Dear	Rebecca	Episode: "The Good Couple"
2001	Nathan's Choice	Julia	Television film
2003	Two and a Half Men	Suzanne	Episode: Pilot
2004	Two and a Half Men	Tina	Episode 2/11: "Last Chance to See Those Tattoos"
2005	Charmed	Eve	Episode: "Run, Piper, Run"
2006	Las Vegas	Judy McKee	Episode: "Fidelity, Security, Delivery"
2007	Two and a Half Men	Nina	Episode 5/7: "Our Leather Gear Is in the Guest Room"
2008	Ghost Whisperer	Jill Benjamin	Episode: "Slam"
2008	Unhitched	Sasha	Episode: "Woman Marries Horse"
2008–2015	Two and a Half Men	Chelsea Melini	36 episodes; recurring (season 6), main (season 7), guest (seasons 9, 12)
2011	Carnal Innocence	Susie	Television film
2012–2013	Burn Notice	Elsa	4 episodes
2013	The Perfect Boyfriend	Karen	Television film
2013	Zombie Night	Karin	Television film
2015	NCIS	Wendy Harris	Episode: "The Lost Boys"
2016	Street Level: Behind the Scenes Featurette	Samantha	
2016	Mom	Alissa	Episode: "Sword Fights and a Dominican Shortstop"
2016	A Date to Die For	Rachel Edwards	Television film
2016	Stalked by My Mother	Claire Beauregard	Television film
2016–2018	Shameless	Anne Seery	6 episodes
2017	Death's Door	Kate Corbin	Upcoming TV series; episode: "Everybody Breaks"
2018	Family Vanished	Carol	Television film
2018	The Young and the Restless	Rebekah (Rebecca) Barlow	Episode: Season 46, Episode 68
2019	In Bed with a Killer	Lena Mitchell	Television film
2020	Twisted Twin	Patricia	Television film
2021	A Deadly Deed	Kat Connolly	Television film
2023	Bookie	Crying Woman	Episode: "Always Smell the Money"
