= Jim Patterson (screenwriter) =

American screenwriter and producer

Jim Patterson is an American screenwriter and producer. He is a co-creator of the comedy-drama television series The Ranch, which he created with Don Reo. He has been nominated for two Primetime Emmy Awards in the category Outstanding Comedy Series for his work on the television program Two and a Half Men, for which he co-showran with Reo for the series' final three seasons.
