= Two and a Half Men season 5 =

Two and a Half Men
- Season 5
- DVD cover art
- Showrunner: Lee Aronsohn
- Starring: Charlie Sheen; Jon Cryer; Angus T. Jones; Marin Hinkle; Conchata Ferrell; Holland Taylor
- No. of episodes: 19

Release
- Original network: CBS
- Original release: September 24, 2007 – May 19, 2008

Season chronology
- ← Previous; Season 4 Next → Season 6

The fifth season of the American television sitcom Two and a Half Men aired on CBS from September 24, 2007 to May 19, 2008.

A total of only 19 episodes were aired due to the 2007–2008 Writers Guild of America strike. Unlike the previous seasons, the Season 5 DVD came without a gag reel. The DVD also titled "Tight's Good" as "Shoes, Hats, Pickle Jar Lids", and the "Previously on Two and a Half Men" recap seen in the original broadcast of "Fish in a Drawer" was initially not included on DVD. This was the shortest season in the history of the show until the eighth season which had 16 episodes.

== Cast ==
=== Main ===
- Charlie Sheen as Charlie Harper
- Jon Cryer as Alan Harper
- Angus T. Jones as Jake Harper
- Marin Hinkle as Judith Harper-Melnick
- Conchata Ferrell as Berta
- Holland Taylor as Evelyn Harper-Leopold

=== Recurring ===
- Melanie Lynskey as Rose
- Ming-Na Wen as Judge Linda
- Robert Wagner as Teddy Leopold (a.k.a. Nathan Krunk)
- Jenny McCarthy as Courtney (a.k.a. Sylvia Fishman)
- Kimberly Quinn as Donna

=== Guest ===
- Janeane Garofalo as Sharon
- Jennifer Taylor as Nina
- Richard Kind as Artie
- Justine Eyre as Gabrielle
- Cerina Vincent as Lulu
- Christina Moore as Cynthia Sullivan
- Carrie Reichenbach as Alexis
- Kathryn Gordon as Jess
- Hayley Erin as Milly
- Jane Lynch as Dr. Linda Freeman
- Emmanuelle Vaugier as Mia
- Jamie Rose as Sloane Jagov
- Michael Lowry as Wes Tosterone
- Susan Blakely as Angie
- Coby Ryan McLaughlin as Jeremy
- Virginia Williams as Tricia

== Writers' strike ==
Production on the show was halted on November 6, 2007 because of the 2007–2008 Writers Guild of America strike, which began on November 5, 2007 and ended on February 12, 2008. The show returned on March 17, 2008 with 9 episodes to conclude the fifth season.

== Episodes ==
No. overall	No. in season	Title	Directed by	Written by	Original release date	Prod. code	U.S. viewers (millions)
97	1	"Large Birds, Spiders and Mom"	Ted Wass	Story by : Mark Roberts & Eddie Gorodetsky; Teleplay by : Lee Aronsohn & Chuck Lorre	September 24, 2007	3T6251	13.58
Jake is getting ready to start a new school as he advances to junior high, but his dad and uncle's scary stories might end his academic career a bit early. Alan and Charlie take him school shopping and find themselves in trouble, both there and later. Meanwhile, Charlie has a rash in a most inopportune area. Title quotation from: Alan, to Charlie, naming several of Charlie's fears.
98	2	"Media Room Slash Dungeon"	Ted Wass	Story by : Chuck Lorre & Lee Aronsohn; Teleplay by : Don Foster & Susan Beavers & Jim Patterson	October 1, 2007	3T6252	13.24
Charlie ends up having to go to one of Evelyn's firm's get-togethers, but the event ends up giving the two a friendship. However, Charlie sleeps with Margaret (Jennifer O'Dell), a woman that he met at the party against Evelyn's orders, but she firmly takes this into an advantage. Alan sleeps with a woman (Janeane Garofalo) who behaves oddly the next morning. Note: For this episode, Holland Taylor was nominated for the 2008 Primetime Emmy Award for Outstanding Supporting Actress in a Comedy Series. Title quotation from: Evelyn, to Charlie, talking about a house she's trying to sell.
99	3	"Dum Diddy Dum Diddy Doo"	Ted Wass	Lee Aronsohn & Chuck Lorre	October 8, 2007	3T6253	13.02
Alan convinces Charlie that he needs to date more respectable women and sets him up with a judge called Linda (Ming-Na Wen). The two double date and things do not go too well, with Charlie inexperienced at dating woman his own age. Desperate for a second chance, Charlie goes to great lengths to speak to Linda again, which include getting himself arrested and appearing in court in front of her. Title quotation from: Charlie, giving an example of what the name "Dee-Dee" could be short for.
100	4	"City of Great Racks"	James Widdoes	Story by : Chuck Lorre & Lee Aronsohn & Don Foster & Mark Roberts; Teleplay by : Eddie Gorodetsky & Susan Beavers & Jim Patterson	October 15, 2007	3T6254	13.69
Charlie and Linda get closer to consummating their relationship, but Charlie has trouble focusing when he begins to see Rose's face everywhere he turns (the dog walker, the bartender and the house keeper). He visits Dr. Freeman who says that he is only imagining Rose because he is afraid to grow up. Reflecting on that, Charlie ends up on the next flight to London to find out if Rose is still truly there. Charlie does indeed find her there, and they go out for a drink at the local pub. While there, she asks for commitment in a relationship, scaring Charlie back to California as he is already in one. After Charlie and Rose leave to go to the pub, we see wigs and costumes in her apartment, revealing that this was part of Rose's scheme. Note: This was the 100th episode of the show, and all seven of its writers had contributed to writing this episode. Title quotation from: Jake, describing Santa Barbara, or "Santa Bar-BRA," as he jokingly called it.
101	5	"Putting Swim Fins on a Cat"	James Widdoes	Story by : Mark Roberts; Teleplay by : Don Foster & Eddie Gorodetsky	October 22, 2007	3T6255	13.94
Charlie discovers that he is good with kids while babysitting Linda's four-year-old son Brandon. Meanwhile, the extreme financial hardship at Chez Harper leads Alan to become a guinea pig for medical products, making some nasty side-effects. While babysitting, Charlie comes up with great funny jingles to help Brandon do as he is told, recording a CD for him. Linda's ex-husband hears some of the songs he recorded for Brandon and Charlie is given the job of making children's jingles. Title quotation from: Alan, to Judith, when discussing Jake's algebra tutor.
102	6	"Help Daddy Find His Toenail"	James Widdoes	Story by : Chuck Lorre & Lee Aronsohn; Teleplay by : Susan Beavers & Jim Patterson	October 29, 2007	3T6256	13.73
Charlie and Linda attend a function crowning Linda judge of the year, but Evelyn gives him a pill that she believes to be a sedative. It turns out to be a wrong pill and therefore he acts crazy at the function, embarrassing her in front of the crowd. Meanwhile, Jake sneaks out to attend a rock concert after Alan forbade him to, and finds an irate Alan back home waiting for him, along with Charlie, whom Linda left because of the events. Title quotation from: Alan, to Judith, on the phone trying to tell her that Jake is still home after finding out that he snuck out.
103	7	"Our Leather Gear is in the Guest Room"	Ted Wass	Chuck Lorre & Lee Aronsohn	November 5, 2007	3T6257	13.80
After Alan and Charlie have a fight about Alan's role in the house, Alan packs Jake up and moves in with his mother. Evelyn and Teddy do not want Alan and Jake in their house and they go to great lengths to reconcile the siblings. Title quotation from: Evelyn, to Teddy, about her problem with Alan staying in the guest room.
104	8	"Is There a Mrs. Waffles?"	Ted Wass	Story by : Susan Beavers & Jim Patterson; Teleplay by : Chuck Lorre & Lee Aronsohn	November 12, 2007	3T6258	14.12
Charlie writes children's songs and finds success as Charlie Waffles. The kids and their parents love him, even signing CDs of his jingles. However, Charlie's newfound fame irritates Alan, and Charlie has a high-proof answer to his sudden stage fright, getting drunk, which actually works out, finding a huge fame at the live audience. Note: For this episode, Charlie Sheen was nominated for the 2008 Primetime Emmy Award for Outstanding Lead Actor in a Comedy Series. Note: The man on the TV with the guitar and singing/speaking is Raffi, best known for his children's music. Title quotation from: One of Charlie's single-mom fans, asking if he is married.
105	9	"Tight's Good"	Jean Sagal	Story by : Mark Roberts; Teleplay by : Don Foster & Eddie Gorodetsky	November 19, 2007	3T6259	13.91
Charlie and Alan are introduced to Teddy's daughter, Courtney (Jenny McCarthy), who works as a sales representative for luxury cars. Teddy warns Charlie to stay away from her. Charlie, thinking Teddy is simply being a protective father, starts an affair with her instead, and when he is caught upstairs with her while Evelyn and Teddy are downstairs, she blackmails him into buying a new Ferrari from her. When all is revealed, Teddy tells Charlie that was why he was warning him. First appearance of: Courtney Leopold; Title quotation from: Courtney, after Charlie explains that the Ferrari she is trying to sell him does not have much room. Note: When released on DVD, this episode was titled "Shoes, Hats, Pickle Jar Lids", but that phrase is not quoted in the episode.
106	10	"Kinda Like Necrophilia"	Ted Wass	Story by : Jim Patterson & Susan Beavers; Teleplay by : Chuck Lorre & Lee Aronsohn	November 26, 2007	3T6260	15.26
Learning Charlie stole away a girl he liked in high school and getting angry about it, Alan gets revenge by stealing Charlie's french girlfriend Gabrielle (Justine Eyre). However, things don't really work out like he planned due to Gabrielle's behavior in bed. But Alan finds out that Charlie wanted to break up with Gabrielle by letting Alan steal her, and, at the same time, sees that Charlie is going out with Alan's high school crush again, causing Alan to be angrier than before. Elsewhere, Jake gets dumped by his girlfriend and he seeks advice from Charlie to patch things up. Note: This was the last episode aired, prior to the 2007–2008 Writers' Strike. Title quotation from: Charlie, about how Gabrielle behaves in bed.
107	11	"Meander to Your Dander"	James Widdoes	Story by : Don Foster & Mark Roberts; Teleplay by : Susan Beavers & Jim Patterson	March 17, 2008	3T6261	14.06
Alan is unhappy about his sex-life with his new girlfriend, Donna (Kimberly Quinn), but is reluctant to break up with her. So he goes to Charlie for advice on breaking up with women. When he does end up breaking up with her, he is shocked to learn that she planned to have a threesome with her hot friend (Sandra Dee Robinson), sending Alan into tears. Meanwhile, Charlie helps a now-free Jake hit on a girl while the two are out to eat. But it ends badly for Charlie when he gets pepper sprayed in the face. Note: This was the first episode aired since November 2007, due to the 2007–2008 Writers' Strike. Note: For this episode, Jon Cryer was nominated for the 2008 Primetime Emmy Award for Outstanding Supporting Actor in a Comedy Series. Title quotation from: Alan, to Donna, discussing his fore-play technique after they've had sex.
108	12	"A Little Clammy and None Too Fresh"	James Widdoes	Story by : Susan Beavers & Jim Patterson; Teleplay by : Chuck Lorre & Lee Aronsohn	March 24, 2008	3T6263	14.24
Charlie sleeps with a woman who is sick, and Charlie accidentally catches her flu. After nobody in his family is there to help him, Rose (who has returned from England) offers her help, but then hits it wild, making Charlie a prisoner in his own house. Meanwhile, Alan feels Jake is pulling away from him, which makes him feel sad. Title quotation from: Charlie, explaining his condition to Alan.
109	13	"The Soil is Moist"	James Widdoes	Story by : Eddie Gorodetsky; Teleplay by : Chuck Lorre & Lee Aronsohn	March 31, 2008	3T6262	14.50
Alan begins dating a divorced woman (Christina Moore) who used to best-couple friends with him and Judith. He's happy until he learns more about Herb and Judith's sex life than he actually wanted to know; eventually she breaks up with him and dumps him on the streets after he starts to question her too much about their sex life. Title quotation from: Herb, describing how he plants seeds, which, to Charlie, sounds like a metaphor about sex.
110	14	"Winky-Dink Time"	James Widdoes	Story by : Mark Roberts; Teleplay by : Eddie Gorodetsky & Jim Patterson	April 14, 2008	3T6264	13.94
While at the coffee shop Charlie is recognised by a woman he dated, but Charlie cannot remember her name, which becomes a problem for him. Jake falls for the same woman's daughter. Charlie double-dates with Jake and fixes Alan up with a hooker, who can't tolerate him, while Charlie's attempt to hide the truth becomes very difficult. Title quotation from: Alan, asking if the prostitute arriving late will shorten the amount of time he can have sex with her.
111	15	"Rough Night in Hump Junction"	James Widdoes	Story by : Mark Roberts; Teleplay by : Chuck Lorre & Lee Aronsohn	April 21, 2008	3T6265	13.36
After seeing Charlie with many females in the space of one day, Alan feels Charlie is unable to control his womanizing ways. Charlie goes to see Dr. Freeman, who makes him realize he is over-dating girls and having sex with them because, the whole time, he is missing the one girl who got away (Mia). Title quotation from: Berta, after seeing Charlie banged up.
112	16	"Look at Me, Mommy, I'm Pretty"	Joel Zwick	Story by : Chuck Lorre & Lee Aronsohn; Teleplay by : Eddie Gorodetsky & Don Foster & Susan Beavers	April 28, 2008	3T6266	12.92
Evelyn and Teddy's wedding is under-way, and Alan helps the two make plans for the ceremony. Courtney tells Charlie that they cannot see each other anymore since they are going to be step-brother and sister, but Charlie can't accept it at all costs, and goes to desperate measures to change her mind, with the help of Rose. Title quotation from: Evelyn, to Courtney, making fun of Alan dressing in her clothes as a child.
113	17	"Fish in a Drawer"	Jeff Melman	Story by : Carol Mendelsohn & Naren Shankar; Teleplay by : Sarah Goldfinger & Evan Dunsky	May 5, 2008	3T6267	13.61
Evelyn's husband, Teddy, is found dead, in this spoof episode of CSI: Crime Scene Investigation. The CSIs investigate the death at Charlie's house. During the interviewing process, it is revealed that Teddy and Courtney are con artists who were trying to steal huge money from both Charlie and Evelyn, causing Courtney to be arrested. (Note: George Eads from CSI guest-stars as one of the guests in Charlie's house with a brief role) This was part of a writer exchange crossover with CSI: Crime Scene Investigation, with Chuck Lorre & Lee Aronsohn writing the CSI episode "Two and a Half Deaths" that also includes cameos from Charlie Sheen, Jon Cryer and Angus T. Jones. Last appearance of: Teddy Leopold; Note: This episode was selected as a Primetime Emmy Award submission for Conchata Ferrell for Outstanding Supporting Actress in a Comedy Series, but ended up not receiving a nomination. Note: When released on DVD, the recap seen in the original broadcast was not included. Title quotation from: Evelyn, explaining her first cooking experience, which ended up killing her first husband (Charlie and Alan's father).
114	18	"If My Hole Could Talk"	Jon Cryer	Story by : Chuck Lorre & Lee Aronsohn; Teleplay by : Eddie Gorodetsky & Jim Patterson & Mark Roberts	May 12, 2008	3T6268	13.82
Alan tries to get Jake to complete a book report about The Taming of the Shrew, but Jake keeps losing the book and neglects to do the report. When they go to buy him a new copy, Charlie seeks a book about relationship advice and meets Angie, an older self-help author (Susan Blakely), whom he then dates. Alan is also smitten by her interest in his problems, and she treats both of them in a motherly way. Title quotation from: Charlie, to Angie, after she says he may have a "hole" in him.
115	19	"Waiting for the Right Snapper"	Jeff Melman	Story by : Eddie Gorodetsky & Don Foster; Teleplay by : Mark Roberts & Lee Aronsohn & Chuck Lorre	May 19, 2008	3T6269	14.70
Charlie's relationship with Angie becomes jeopardized after he meets her son's fiancé (Virginia Williams) and realizes that she is one of his ex-girlfriends. Things get worse when she tries to hook up with Charlie again, and she leaves her future husband when Charlie rejects her, causing him to break his relationship with Angie. Meanwhile, Alan tries to get Jake to study for his algebra exam, but Jake has other ideas. Title quotation from: Charlie, to Angie's son, after he says he was surprised nobody had "snapped" his fiancé.

== US Nielsen ratings ==
Order	Episode	Rating	Share	Rating/Share (18-49)	Viewers (millions)
1	"Large Birds, Spiders, and Mom"	8.4	12	4.7/11	13.44
2	"Media Room Slash Dungeon"	8.4	12	4.6/11	13.38
3	"Dum Diddy Dum Diddy Doo"	8.1	TBA	4.4/10	12.98
4	"City of Great Racks"	8.9	10	4.8/11	13.78
5	"Putting Swim Fins on a Cat"	8.7	12	4.8/11	13.74
6	"Help Daddy Find His Toenail"	8.7	9	5.1/12	14.12
7	"Our Leather Gear is in the Guestroom"	8.7	12	5.0/11	14.08
8	"Is There a Mrs. Waffles?"	8.7	TBA	5.0/11	14.17
9	"Tight's Good"	8.8	13	5.1/12	14.46
10	"Kinda Like Necrophilia"	9.5	12	5.0/11	15.30
11	"Meander to Your Dander"	8.5	TBA	5.4/13	14.03
12	"A Little Clammy and None Too Fresh"	8.7	13	5.1/13	14.25
13	"The Soil is Moist"	8.8	TBA	5.3/13	14.34
14	"Winky-Dink Time"	8.5	TBA	5.3/13	13.83
15	"Rough Night in Hump Junction"	8.3	12	4.9/12	13.28
16	"Look at Me, Mommy, I'm Pretty"	7.1	TBA	4.7/11	12.86
17	"Fish in a Drawer"	8.5	TBA	4.8/12	13.61
18	"If My Hole Could Talk"	8.5	TBA	5.0/12	13.70
19	"Waiting for the Right Snapper"	9.1	TBA	4.8/12	14.81
