= CSI: Crime Scene Investigation season 8 =

American TV show season

CSI: Crime Scene Investigation
- Season 8
- Season 8 U.S. DVD cover
- Starring: William Petersen; Marg Helgenberger; Gary Dourdan; George Eads; Jorja Fox; Eric Szmanda; Robert David Hall; Wallace Langham; Paul Guilfoyle
- No. of episodes: 17

Release
- Original network: CBS
- Original release: September 27, 2007 – May 15, 2008

Season chronology
- ← Previous; Season 7 Next → Season 9

The eighth season of CSI: Crime Scene Investigation premiered on CBS on September 27, 2007, and ended May 15, 2008. The season stars William Petersen and Marg Helgenberger.

== Plot ==
As the CSIs race to save one of their own ("Dead Doll"), Sara makes a life-changing decision ("Goodbye and Good Luck"), and one investigator falls ("For Gedda"), in the eighth season of CSI. Grissom, Willows and their team investigate the death of go-kart racer ("A La Cart"), a demonic possession ("Go to Hell"), the death of a hermaphrodite ("The Case of the Cross-Dressing Carp"), the murder of a slasher film actress ("The Chick Chop Flick Shop"), and a kidnapping that brings New York's top FBI agent to Las Vegas ("Who and What"). Meanwhile, Catherine finds herself affected by the death of a three-year-old ("A Thousand Days on Earth"), and the death of a difficult TV star leads Brass and Grissom to Hollywood ("Two and a Half Deaths").

== Cast ==
=== Main cast ===
- William Petersen as Gil Grissom, a CSI Level 3 Supervisor
- Marg Helgenberger as Catherine Willows, a CSI Level 3 Assistant Supervisor
- Gary Dourdan as Warrick Brown, a CSI Level 3
- George Eads as Nick Stokes, a CSI Level 3
- Jorja Fox as Sara Sidle, a CSI Level 3 (episodes 1–7)
- Eric Szmanda as Greg Sanders, a CSI Level 2
- Robert David Hall as Al Robbins, the Chief Medical Examiner
- Wallace Langham as David Hodges, a Trace Technician
- Paul Guilfoyle as Jim Brass, a Homicide Detective Captain

=== Recurring cast ===
- Liz Vassey as Wendy Simms
- Archie Kao as Archie Johnson
- David Berman as David Phillips
- Sheeri Rappaport as Mandy Webster
- Jon Wellner as Henry Andrews
- Marc Vann as Conrad Ecklie
- Jessica Lucas as Ronnie Lake
- Conor O'Farrell as Jeffrey McKean

=== Guest cast ===
- Peyton List as Maggie Mullins
- Louise Lombard as Sofia Curtis
- Jessie Collins as Natalie Davis
- Anthony LaPaglia as Jack Malone
- Method Man as Drops
- Katey Sagal as Annabelle Fundt

=== Cameo appearances ===
- Jamie Hyneman ("The Theory of Everything")
- Adam Savage ("The Theory of Everything")
- Charlie Sheen ("Two and a Half Deaths")
- Jon Cryer ("Two and a Half Deaths")
- Angus T. Jones ("Two and a Half Deaths")

=== Changes ===
Louise Lombard departed the cast after the first episode of the season, while Jorja Fox signed on for only the first seven episodes. This is the final full season to star Gary Dourdan and William Petersen, and the last season to feature every original main cast member in a starring role. Wallace Langham joined the main cast.

== Production ==
Only 11 episodes had been completed and aired before the 2007 Writers Guild of America strike. Only six more episodes were made after the strike, for a total of only 17 episodes. Some international broadcasters only showed the first part of the crossover "Who and What" because Without a Trace did not air (or aired older seasons) at the time.

== Episodes ==
No. overall	No. in season	Title	Directed by	Written by	Original release date	US viewers (millions)
166	1	"Dead Doll"	Kenneth Fink	Story by : Naren Shankar; Teleplay by : Dustin Lee Abraham & Allen MacDonald	September 27, 2007	25.22
With Natalie Davis, "The Miniature Killer", giving no answers to Sara's whereabouts, Grissom and his team use whatever evidence they had to piece together clues to search for Sara, left to die underneath a wrecked car in the desert - a scene replicated by her miniature scene.
167	2	"A La Cart"	Richard J. Lewis	Sarah Goldfinger & Richard Catalani	October 4, 2007	20.97
When a road cleanup crew discovered a helmeted head of a high school-aged teen, Grissom, Nick, and Greg investigate the death of a go-kart racer whose headless body is found yards away from the highway he was racing on. Meanwhile, Catherine and Warrick work to unravel the mysterious murder of a popular men's magazine publisher at a restaurant where patrons dine in the dark. Also, Ecklie has concerns for Grissom and Sara, after observing that they're being too close in the workplace.
168	3	"Go to Hell"	Jeffrey Hunt	Douglas Petrie	October 11, 2007	19.79
The team investigates the murder of a couple and their younger daughter, and the disappearance of their older daughter (Britt Robertson), who is believed to be possessed by the devil; the prime suspect of the case was a preacher whom the daughter's parents believed he "exorcised" to death. Meanwhile Sara and a new CSI, Ronnie, investigate the death of a homeless man found on a garbage pile.
169	4	"The Case of the Cross-Dressing Carp"	Alec Smight	David Rambo & Jacqueline Hoyt	October 18, 2007	21.22
The hanging death of a male with breasts more typical for a female is connected to a tainted water supply. While examining a bee colony as part of that investigation, Sara accepts Grissom's marriage proposal. Meanwhile, Ronnie and the day crew investigate 40-year-old skeletal remains found at the site of a new casino being constructed; as the project was orchestrated by Catherine's late father, Sam Braun, she excuses herself from the case due to conflict of interest. During the course of the investigation, they also uncovered a roll of film that had incriminating evidence about the old casino. The pictures were of interest to Greg, who revealed he is writing a book about the history of Las Vegas.
170	5	"The Chick Chop Flick Shop"	Richard J. Lewis	Evan Dunsky	November 1, 2007	19.06
The team investigates the murder of Weatherley Adams, a horror/slasher film actress found on the set with an ax in her back. The autopsy reveals that she was gored but that the ax wasn't the murder weapon. When Ronnie discovers a second body at the studio hanging from the rafters, she also comes face to face with the killer, in a scene not unlike the slasher films the studio produces. Also, still reeling from her own brush with death earlier, Sara despairs at having death thrust in her face everyday. (Guest stars John Ventimiglia.)
171	6	"Who & What"	Danny Cannon	Story by : Carol Mendelsohn & Naren Shankar; Teleplay by : Richard Catalani & Danny Cannon	November 8, 2007	21.94
The FBI's Jack Malone (Anthony LaPaglia) joins forces with Grissom to track a serial killer after a boy who was kidnapped six years ago in New York matches the profile of a murder victim in Las Vegas. As the victim's residence is adjacent to a rail line, Grissom and Malone hopes to catch the suspect before he leaves town. This episode begins a crossover with Without a Trace that concludes on "Where and Why".
172	7	"Goodbye & Good Luck"	Kenneth Fink	Story by : Allen MacDonald & Sarah Goldfinger; Teleplay by : Allen MacDonald & Naren Shankar	November 15, 2007	21.37
The CSIs investigate when a college freshman plunges to her death and her death is revealed to be a murder. They discover the victim had a relationship with Marlon West, a teen who, in Season 6's "The Unusual Suspect", was acquitted on a murder charge with the help of his younger sister, a child prodigy named Hannah. Sara handles the case and she becomes convinced Hannah killed Marlon's girlfriend and is framing him for the murder as an attempt to put him in jail and keep control of him. The whole affair ends in tragedy, with Marlon hanging himself in his cell and Hannah crushed by the news, seemingly showing that she did indeed kill the freshman. This case proved too much for Sara to take; burned out, she leaves Las Vegas in a taxi cab, but not before giving Grissom one more kiss and a goodbye letter, explaining why she decided to resign and leave, and leaving behind her vest as a good luck gesture for Ronnie (in her last appearance in this series).
173	8	"You Kill Me"	Paris Barclay	Story by : Naren Shankar & Sarah Goldfinger; Teleplay by : Douglas Petrie & Naren Shankar	November 22, 2007	14.75
Hodges talks about hypothetical murders with his fellow lab techs to give them a chance to play CSI, but unbeknownst to them he was taping the conversation to gather material for a board game he's creating. Meanwhile, everyone tries to comfort Grissom following Sara's departure (who as of this episode was seeing relatives in San Francisco), but he chose to keep working as a way to combat his depression.
174	9	"Cockroaches"	William Friedkin	Dustin Lee Abraham	December 6, 2007	18.80
A man's body is thrown from a garbage truck that is being chased by the police. The victim was a limo driver connected to a strip club run by a notorious mob ringleader, Lou Gedda. Warrick believes Gedda is responsible and sets out to prove it. Unfortunately, Warrick's divorce, his addiction to pills and a sudden reckless lifestyle negatively impact his job. Later, Warrick becomes the chief suspect in another mob-related murder when his date, an exotic dancer at the club was found murdered in his car at the same club, and he knew nothing about her departure. (Guest starred Dennis Christopher.)
175	10	"Lying Down with Dogs"	Michael Slovis	Christopher Barbour & Michael F.X. Daley	December 13, 2007	19.87
The body of a wealthy socialite, known for her charitable contributions, is discovered in a dumping ground along with the bodies of several dogs. The investigation reveals the victim was involved in illegal dog fighting and may have tortured some of the animals at a kennel. Meanwhile, Warrick tries to prove he is innocent of murdering an exotic dancer whose body was found in his car outside Lou Gedda's nightclub; his adamant belief on his innocence led to a two-week suspension by Grissom, with a threat of termination if he pressed the issue further. (Guest starred Dennis Christopher.)
176	11	"Bull"	Richard J. Lewis	Story by : David Rambo & Steven Felder; Teleplay by : David Rambo	January 10, 2008	18.19
Three murders occur during the annual National Finals Rodeo in Las Vegas. The first victim is a bull rider who is discovered after hours in an empty bull ring. The second is a hit-and-run victim who is linked to the dead bull rider. Later, a third victim, a local pimp, is gunned down in a saloon's restroom. The investigation reveals the crimes may be connected to an illegal bull-breeding ring. (Guest starred Julie Brown and Joseph Campanella. Opens with The Star-Spangled Banner sung by Jewel. Final new episode completed before the WGA strike.)
177	12	"Grissom's Divine Comedy"	Richard J. Lewis	Story by : Jacqueline Hoyt & Carol Mendelsohn; Teleplay by : Jacqueline Hoyt	April 3, 2008	20.58
While Grissom was at home nursing a cold, he was called on by district attorney Maddie Klein (Bonnie Bedelia) to be an expert witness for a grand jury investigating La Tijera ("The Scissor"), a very dangerous Las Vegas gang. The gang appears to be terrorizing and murdering witnesses who could land them in jail. Grissom is reluctant, but Maddie insists he is the only one for the job. In his investigation, he discovered that imprisoned inmates were communicating with others using invisible ink on pages torn out of books.
178	13	"A Thousand Days on Earth"	Kenneth Fink	Evan Dunsky	April 10, 2008	20.09
After completing his show, a stand up comedian discovered the body of a 3-year-old girl in a vacuum cleaner box. This disturbing death had a great impact on Catherine as she searches for clues to her murder, naming the "Baby Jane Doe" as "Cordelia" after the street where she was found. While Cordelia's death touched many people, it ruined the life of a young man, who was the initial suspect, based on his prior record and the vacuum cleaner box alone.
179	14	"Drops' Out"	Jeffrey Hunt	Story by : Dustin Lee Abraham & Naren Shankar; Teleplay by : Dustin Lee Abraham & Allen MacDonald	April 24, 2008	17.02
Brass, Grissom, and Nick work the case of a female victim found in an apartment building with a gunshot wound, and another victim in the apartment directly above, also killed from a gunshot wound. The apartments were leased to Drops (Method Man), who became a person of interest during the investigation, even though he is still in jail. This led to Brass and Nick taking the unorthodox step of letting him out of jail in their custody to search for the actual suspects.
180	15	"The Theory of Everything"	Christopher Leitch	Story by : Carol Mendelsohn & David Rambo; Teleplay by : Douglas Petrie & David Rambo	May 1, 2008	18.01
The whole team look into an abundance of unusual cases: the death of a man who burst into flames in police custody; the death of a woman and a man with green blood which is linked to a migraine drug; and the death of a senior couple who were in a pest control problem with their neighbors, which are all related in different ways. Note: Jamie Hyneman and Adam Savage make a cameo appearance as lab technicians as Nick tests the idea that a stun gun can ignite the shirt of a perp who had been maced. After subsequent massive viewer requests, they put it to the test on MythBusters and found it plausible in Fireball Stun Gun since some pepper sprays use a flammable oil-based propellant, some types of modern flannel material (especially acrylic fiber) are flammable and a stun gun is a more than viable method of ignition.
181	16	"Two and a Half Deaths"	Alec Smight	Chuck Lorre & Lee Aronsohn	May 8, 2008	18.07
The difficult star (Katey Sagal) of a TV sitcom is murdered while filming an episode in Las Vegas. The investigation reveals plenty of suspects, including her husband, the actress who is her stand-in (also Katey Sagal) and the show's entire staff of writers. This was part of a writer exchange crossover with Two and a Half Men, with Carol Mendelsohn and the CSI writers writing the Two and a Half Men episode "Fish in a Drawer" that also guest-starred George Eads. Includes cameos from Charlie Sheen, Jon Cryer and Angus T. Jones; episode also features Extra anchor (as of 2008), Dayna Devon.
182	17	"For Gedda"	Kenneth Fink	Story by : Dustin Lee Abraham & Kenneth Fink; Teleplay by : Dustin Lee Abraham & Richard Catalani	May 15, 2008	18.06
At a funeral for an African American man, the bottom of his casket fell out as the pallbearers were carrying it; it was discovered that a white man, a private investigator who was working with Warrick on the Lou Gedda case, was sharing the coffin after he was killed. Later, Warrick is accused of murdering Gedda, of whom he crossed paths earlier at his strip club. Even more troubling is the fact that Warrick is not certain if he is innocent or guilty of the crime. The CSIs would investigate to discover the actual perpetrator, though it would come at a steep price for Warrick.
