= Dead Doll =

- CSI: Crime Scene Investigation episode
- Episode no.: Season 8 Episode 1
- Directed by: Kenneth Fink
- Written by: Allen MacDonald; Dustin Lee Abraham; Naren Shankar
- Original air date: September 27, 2007

Guest appearances
- Jessie Collins as Natalie Davis; Zach Grenier as Dr. Kachler; Larry Hankin as Zapata Childs

Episode chronology
← Previous "Living Doll"	Next → "A La Cart"

"Dead Doll" is the eighth season premiere of the American crime drama television series CSI: Crime Scene Investigation, which is set in Las Vegas, Nevada, and the 166th episode overall. Written by Allen MacDonald, Dustin Lee Abraham and Naren Shankar and directed by Kenneth Fink, the episode aired on September 27, 2007 on CBS. This episode is the conclusion from the previous episode Living Doll and the end of "The Miniature Killer" arc story.

== Plot ==
The eighth season begins with Grissom and his team searching for Sara, who was kidnapped by the miniature killer and left to die underneath a wrecked car in the middle of the desert during a storm. In the episode "Dead Doll", Natalie Davis (the Miniature Killer) mostly sits in prison - except in the flashbacks. It shows Natalie using a taser on Sara and putting Sara in the trunk of her car. Sara escapes, but Natalie catches her, drugs her, and puts her underneath a Red Mustang, like in the model. Sara wakes up under the car, but it starts to rain. She manages to pull her arm free and escapes from underneath the car. She starts to wander the desert with a mirror that she took from the car. In the end she collapses in the desert, but Nick and Sofia drive by where Sara is located, and Nick sees the sun reflecting off the mirror. He rushes to her and finds her without a pulse. A helicopter and medics come to take her to the hospital. Grissom insists that he goes with her. At the very end of the episode she opens her eyes, and looks at him.

== Reception ==
The episode was the most watched in America and got 24.8 million viewers, which, according to the New York Times, gives it "its largest margin of victory to date opposite ABC's Grey's Anatomy at 9 p.m. (with 20.5 million viewers)."

== Production notes ==
- Wallace Langham who plays David Hodges is a regular cast member now and he is listed in the opening credits.
- Louise Lombard who plays Sofia Curtis is no longer in the opening credits. She does appear in this episode but is listed as a "Special Guest Appearance".
