= VOTD =

VOTD may refer to:

- Voyage of the Damned, a 1974 novel and 1976 film concerning the fate of the MS St. Louis
- "Voyage of the Damned", a 1997 episode of the fifth season of Frasier
- "Voyage of the Damned" (Doctor Who), a 2007 episode of Doctor Who featuring the Tenth Doctor
- "Victory of the Daleks", a 2010 episode of Doctor Who featuring the Eleventh Doctor
