= The Alarmist =

- Theatrical release poster
- Directed by: Evan Dunsky
- Written by: Keith Reddin (play); Evan Dunsky
- Produced by: Dan Stone; Lisa Zimble
- Starring: David Arquette; Stanley Tucci; Mary McCormack; Kate Capshaw
- Cinematography: Alex Nepomniaschy
- Edited by: Norman Buckley
- Music by: Christophe Beck
- Production companies: Bandeira Entertainment; Dan Stone, Flynn-Simchowitz; Key Entertainment
- Distributed by: Lions Gate Films
- Release date: September 5, 1997
- Running time: 92 minutes
- Country: United States
- Language: English

The Alarmist, also known as Life During Wartime, is a 1997 dark comedy film written and directed by Evan Dunsky, and starring David Arquette, Stanley Tucci, Mary McCormack and Kate Capshaw. It is an adaptation of the 1990 play Life During Wartime written by Keith Reddin.

== Plot ==
The film begins with Heinrich Grigoris explaining to his new employee Tommy Hudler how to sell home security systems. Tommy starts selling the systems and makes a sale to Gale Anconca, a widow, during which he meets her teenage son, Howard.

Tommy has dinner with Heinrich and Sally to celebrate his first sale. Back at Gale’s house, Tommy sets up her security code, and they impulsively sleep together.

Tommy attempts to sell a system to an elderly couple, the Fieldings, but Mr. Fielding explains they feel safe because of his extensive gun collection.

Heinrich informs Tommy that he will be the spokesman for a commercial they are filming. During the shoot, Tommy performs well and is congratulated by Heinrich. Tommy and Gale’s relationship grows, and he suggests they go on vacation to have uninterrupted intimacy. He also proposes Gale meet his parents, but she clarifies that their relationship is not that serious.

Driving home from a bar, Heinrich stops at a house he had secured before, and they sneak in through the back. Heinrich kicks down the door, triggering the alarm, and they run off. He tells Tommy it’s “just business.” The next day, Heinrich receives a call from the homeowner praising the security system. Heinrich explains these mock break-in incidents boost sales. Tommy is skeptical, but Heinrich's secretary says they only do this to survive, as crime is statistically down.

Preparing for their trip, Howard introduces Tommy to his girlfriend, April, who recognizes him from the commercial. While driving to visit his parents, Tommy stops so Gale can meet his family. They stay overnight, but Gale leaves quietly in the night and returns home to Howard. Tommy tries calling Gale several times but only reaches her voicemail. Heinrich’s secretary then informs him the police are at the office. Tommy is taken to identify Gale and Howard’s bodies at the morgue. The police say there was a break-in and that the robber likely panicked and killed them.

Tommy dreams of Gale, who tells him he “knows who did this.” Heinrich suggests Tommy might have wrongly suspected him, but Tommy denies it.

Heinrich tells Sally that Mrs. Fielding, the antique collector he mentioned, had planned to buy a system but called to say she’ll be out of town. Tommy secretly follows Heinrich and watches him attempt to break into the Fielding house. Tommy calls Mr. Fielding, who initially is skeptical until he hears glass breaking. Mr. Fielding grabs his gun and fires at Heinrich, who dodges the bullets and hides. When Mr. Fielding runs out of bullets and tries to reach his holstered gun, he accidentally shoots himself in the foot, allowing Heinrich to escape.

The next day, Tommy asks about Heinrich, thinking he might be dead. Heinrich appears and asks Tommy to admit that he believes Heinrich is responsible for Gale and Howard’s deaths. Heinrich admits to trying to rob the Fieldings but denies involvement in Gale and Howard’s deaths. Tommy quits, overwhelmed by thoughts of killing Heinrich and disposing of the body.

At home, Tommy finds April upset about Howard’s death. He tells her he knows who the killer is. The next day, Heinrich finds April crying outside his home. Tommy approaches with a gun, but as Heinrich tries to convince Tommy to lower it, April hits him over the head with a metal pipe. They tie Heinrich up and put him in the car, but Tommy drives off, leaving April behind.

Heinrich insists he had nothing to do with Gale and Howard’s deaths. He asks Tommy to call the police for any updates before he kills him. Tommy reluctantly calls, and the detective tells him the culprit has been caught and confessed. Tommy apologizes and unties Heinrich. They drive home, and Heinrich resolves to be a better person.

The epilogue reveals that Heinrich left his life of crime, Tommy had a brief but successful acting career and is now married, and Gale and Howard were the fifth and sixth victims of the actual killer, a contractor.

== Cast ==
- David Arquette as Tommy Hudler
- Stanley Tucci as Heinrich Grigoris
- Kate Capshaw as Gale Ancona
- Mary McCormack as Sally
- Ryan Reynolds as Howard Ancona
- Tricia Vessey as April Brody
- Ruth Miller as Mrs. Fielding
- Hoke Howell as Mr. Fielding
- Michael Learned as Beth Hudler
- Lewis Arquette as Bruce Hudler
- Richmond Arquette as Andrew Hudler
- Gabriel Dell Jr. as Skippy Hudler
- Clea DuVall as Suzy (as Clea Duvall)
- David Brisbin as Detective Flinkman
- Matt Malloy as Morgue Technician
- Alex Nepomniaschy as Installer

== Reception ==
The Alarmist was reviewed by several mainstream critics. Most of them praised Stanley Tucci's performance, but criticized the film itself.

Stephen Holden from The New York Times called Tucci's performance "one of the subtlest, most delicious performances of his career". He found the first part of the film very entertaining, but considered that the movie deteriorates in its second part when it becomes more serious. "Shortly after the halfway point, "The Alarmist" takes a dramatic U-turn into a murder mystery in which Tommy suspects his boss of being the killer. At this point a movie that succeeded as a light, loopy satire of sex, salesmanship, shoddy ethics, gun nuts and geeky teen-agers finds itself seriously in over its head. Unable to decide where to go or what tone to adopt, it ends up treading water."

Edward Guthmann from San Francisco Chronicle also praised Tucci's performance, but criticized the film indecision. "As a showcase for Tucci's comic skills, "The Alarmist" succeeds. We start the film feeling buoyed by his roosterlike energy and audacity, and we end it feeling let down by a script that can't quite decide what it wants to say." Steve Davis from The Austin Chronicle called The Alarmist a "near-pointless movie" and wrote: "Perhaps the greatest sin of The Alarmist is its complete waste of Tucci in the role of Heinreich Grigoris, Hudler's paternal but unscrupulous mentor. Tucci never takes off; it's a stillborn performance. Maybe if Tucci had found something with which to work, the movie in turn might have found the center it so badly needs. As it is, The Alarmist is a movie that doesn't ring any bells."
