= Frasier season 4 =

Frasier
- Season 4
- DVD cover
- Showrunner: Christopher Lloyd
- Starring: Kelsey Grammer; Jane Leeves; David Hyde Pierce; Peri Gilpin; Dan Butler; John Mahoney
- No. of episodes: 24

Release
- Original network: NBC
- Original release: September 17, 1996 – May 20, 1997

Season chronology
- ← Previous; Season 3 Next → Season 5

The fourth season of the American television sitcom Frasier aired on NBC from September 17, 1996 to May 20, 1997.

== Cast ==
=== Main ===
- Kelsey Grammer as Frasier Crane
- Jane Leeves as Daphne Moon
- David Hyde Pierce as Niles Crane
- Peri Gilpin as Roz Doyle
- John Mahoney as Martin Crane

=== Special guest ===
- Robert Prosky as T.H. Houghton
- Marsha Mason as Sherry
- Patricia Wettig as Stephanie
- James Earl Jones as Norman
- Bebe Neuwirth as Lilith
- Linda Hamilton as Laura
- Dan Butler as Bulldog

=== Special appearance by ===
- Bobby Sherman as himself

=== Recurring ===
- Edward Hibbert as Gil Chesterton

=== Guest ===
- Trevor Einhorn as Frederick
- Jane Lynch as Cynthia
- Jane Kaczmarek as Maureen
- Željko Ivanek as Dr. Arnold Shaw
- Lisa Darr as Laura
- Megan Mullally as Beth
- Rosemary Murphy as Carol Larkin
- Lois Smith as Moira
- Harriet Sansom Harris as Bebe Glazer
- Kathryn Joosten as Vera
- Patrick Kerr as Noel Shempsky
- Pauley Perrette as Waitress
- Scott Atkinson as Clive

== Episodes ==
No. overall	No. in season	Title	Directed by	Written by	Original release date	Prod. code	U.S. viewers (millions)
73	1	"The Two Mrs. Cranes"	David Lee	Joe Keenan	September 17, 1996	401	21.77
Daphne receives a phone call from Clive (Scott Atkinson), an old fiancé whom she ditched due to his lack of ambition and drive. She invites him to the apartment, where she introduces Niles as her husband, to Niles' delight. Martin joins in the deception and deliberately complicates it, claiming to be a retired astronaut and when Roz arrives unexpectedly, Martin introduces her as Frasier's wife. Clive is now a successful businessman, and Daphne regrets trying to put him off. She and Roz both compete for his attention leaving Clive appalled.
74	2	"Love Bites Dog"	Jeff Melman	Suzanne Martin	September 24, 1996	402	19.76
Roz arranges a blind date for Frasier with her friend Sharon (Jen Campbell), a former professional golfer. They meet and are immediately attracted, until Bulldog enters. He disparages golf, so Sharon challenges him to a game. They leave together and quickly become an item, much to Roz's anger. Bulldog is then heartbroken when Sharon dumps him over the phone shortly before his show. Guest Callers: Marv Albert as Jerry; Julius Erving as Mike; Bob Costas as Jake
75	3	"The Impossible Dream"	David Lee	Rob Greenberg	October 15, 1996	404	14.5
Frasier has a recurring erotic dream in which he wakes up in bed, hears the shower running and is shocked when the person who emerges is KACL’s food critic, Gil Chesterton (Edward Hibbert). He struggles to work out the meaning of the dream, eventually concluding that his show did not provide him with the challenge he needed, so his subconscious provided a problem for him to work out. Guest Callers: Kieran Culkin as Jimmy; Christopher Durang as Rudy
76	4	"A Crane's Critique"	Jeff Melman	Dan Cohen & F. J. Pratt	October 22, 1996	405	15.5
From an outdoor table at the Cafe Nervosa, Frasier and Niles spot T.H. Houghton (Robert Prosky), an author they idolized from childhood, whose one and only work was a landmark novel called Time Flies Tomorrow. Wanting to speak, they follow him, finding him at a sports bar talking to Martin, who he becomes friends with. When Houghton visits Frasier's apartment, he accidentally leaves his satchel behind, which contains a manuscript of his long-awaited new book. Frasier and Niles read it and consider it a masterpiece, but in trying to praise Houghton, they convince him that the novel is hopelessly derivative and he destroys it before it can be published.
77	5	"Head Game"	David Lee	Rob Greenberg	November 12, 1996	408	20.41
Frasier is about to spend a week in Aspen at a psychiatrists' convention, and he asks Niles to stand in for him at KACL. While making way for Bulldog in the studio, Niles meets basketball player Reggie McLemore (Lorenzo Newton), who’s having a slump. Niles gives him two minutes' worth of advice in the corridor, and later that day Martin sees Reggie win a game for the Sonics on television. Niles is hailed as a hero in Seattle, and given VIP tickets to the next game, but he soon discovers that it was not his psychiatric expertise that Reggie believes helped him; it was his hair. Guest Caller: Wendy Wasserstein as Linda
78	6	"Mixed Doubles"	Jeff Melman	Christopher Lloyd	November 19, 1996	407	18.44
When Daphne breaks up with Joe, Niles decides to tell her about his feelings, but Frasier persuades him to wait for a day in order to consider it. The next day, Niles arrives at the apartment with a large bouquet of flowers, only to find that the previous night Daphne met a man called Rodney (Kevin Farrell) at a singles bar. Niles is despondent, but determined not to let it get him down, and asks Roz to take him to the same singles bar, where he meets a woman called Adelle (Allison Mackie). Rodney proves to be very similar to Niles, though neither Daphne nor Niles seem to realize it.
79	7	"A Lilith Thanksgiving"	Jeff Melman	Chuck Ranberg & Anne Flett-Giordano	November 26, 1996	403	19.57
Lilith has arranged a meeting for Thanksgiving morning with the headmaster of the Marbury Academy, a very exclusive school, with the aim of getting Frederick (Trevor Einhorn) admitted. As a result, the family goes to Boston. Lilith leaves Niles in charge of preparing the Thanksgiving meal, and Martin in charge of entertaining Frederick, while she and Frasier go to meet Dr. Campbell (Paxton Whitehead), who they infuriate with their desperate attempts to ingratiate themselves.
80	8	"Our Father Whose Art Ain't Heaven"	Jeff Melman	Michael B. Kaplan	December 10, 1996	406	16.93
After a trip to the cinema, Martin complains that Frasier paid for the tickets when they had initially agreed that Martin would. The two of them decide that the next time they go out, Martin will pay. So when Daphne says she is cooking sheep's head soup for dinner, the three of them head off to Le Cigare Volante instead. After another argument about money, Martin refuses to pay, but he later tries to make it up by buying a painting from the restaurant. Niles and Frasier had effusively praised the painting so as not to offend the maître d', though in reality they disliked it. Guest Caller: John Cusack as Greg
81	9	"Dad Loves Sherry, the Boys Just Whine"	James Burrows	Joe Keenan	January 7, 1997	410	19.10
Martin breaks up with his girlfriend Maureen (Jane Kaczmarek), but quickly starts a new relationship with Sherry (Marsha Mason). She is loud, boisterous and brash, and plays the banjo. Frasier and Niles soon take a disliking to her, but nevertheless pretend to like her for the sake of Martin's feelings; however, as spending time in her company gradually becomes more straining for both of them, they realize that they will have to confront Martin about her.
82	10	"Liar! Liar!"	James Burrows	Chuck Ranberg & Anne Flett-Giordano	January 14, 1997	411	18.06
A discussion of the moral balance of polite lying leads to the recollection of the Crane brothers setting off a fire alarm to avoid gym class and blaming a bully, John Rajeski, who was summarily expelled. Feeling guilty, the brothers attempt to contact and reconcile with him, only to discover he is incarcerated. While visiting him in prison, John (Saul Stein) becomes convinced that his expulsion led directly to his current situation. Frasier also learns that John has a violent temper, so he does not reveal the full story of his expulsion. However, his guilt persists, and he decides to assuage it by smoothing over the bully's troubled marriage. Frasier meets with John's wife, Susan (Carlene Watkins), who says that their marital problems are caused by her fetish for “nearly getting caught”, then attempts to seduce Frasier just before her husband arrives.
83	11	"Three Days of the Condo"	David Lee	Michael B. Kaplan	January 21, 1997	412	19.08
Frasier has a new antique Japanese door knocker, which he claims "is said to bring peace and tranquility to any home it adorns". Minutes after he fixes it to his front door, he receives an angry note from Ms. Langer (Dana Ivey), the chair of the condo board, claiming that the knocker violates rules of hallway decoration. He decides to raise the issue at the next condo board meeting, but Ms. Langer dismisses the request so abruptly that Frasier loses his temper and storms out. Soon afterwards, Frasier is approached in the unlit parking lot of Elliott Bay Towers by a secretive figure (Austin Pendleton), who wants him to run against Ms. Langer, for the good of the other residents.
84	12	"Death and the Dog"	James Burrows	Suzanne Martin	February 11, 1997	409	15.26
During a slow day on his show at KACL, Frasier decides to tell a story about the aftermath of Eddie's recent trip to the vet. Eddie is not himself: he has lost his appetite, he is not sleeping, and seems generally listless. The vet says he is physically fine, so Martin worries that he may be depressed, and Daphne suggests taking him to a dog psychiatrist (Zeljko Ivanek), to the chagrin of Frasier and Niles. The diagnosis is that Eddie senses depression elsewhere in the family, so they are encouraged to act positively when around him. Guest Caller: Patty Duke as Alice
85	13	"Four for the Seesaw"	Jeff Melman	David Lloyd	February 18, 1997	413	15.40
Frasier is having his flu shot live on his show, and despite his fear of needles, is determined to go through with it. Later, on a particularly busy day at Café Nervosa, Frasier and Niles decide to share a table with two attractive young women (Lisa Darr and Megan Mullally). The brothers each begin to date one of the women, and the four arrange a weekend at a mountain cabin. However, at the cabin, Niles starts feeling guilty about his separation from Maris.
86	14	"To Kill a Talking Bird"	David Lee	Jeffrey Richman	February 25, 1997	414	17.15
Niles is moving into an exclusive new apartment building: The Montana. Anxious to make a good impression, he plans to throw a dinner party for his new neighbours, one of whom, Stephanie Garrett (Patricia Wettig), has taken a shine to Frasier. After being forced to part with his whippet, Niles acquires a cockatoo named Baby. The bird is easily startled by sharp noises, such as the doorbell. This causes problems on the evening of the dinner party, when she digs her claws into Niles' scalp, and refuses to let go. Frasier is compelled to play host, leaving little time to talk to Stephanie.
87	15	"Roz's Krantz and Gouldenstein Are Dead"	Jeff Melman	William Lucas Walker	March 11, 1997	415	17.36
While out driving, Frasier and Niles discover Roz collecting litter on the side of the road with a group of other people. She explains it is community service for a speeding offence, and she chose this option rather than visiting a retirement home, due to her fear of ageing. Frasier persuades her to confront her fear, but while playing checkers with the elderly Mr. Krantz, he dies mid-game. Frasier insists she persevere, but while reading to another resident, Mr. Gouldenstein, he dies as well. Frasier accompanies her to her next visit, where he meets a blind man named Norman (James Earl Jones), who is a fan of his. Guest Caller: Eric Roberts as Chet
88	16	"The Unnatural"	Pamela Fryman	Michael B. Kaplan	April 1, 1997	420	16.90
Frasier's son, Frederick, is visiting him in Seattle for the week. He has requested a tour of Microsoft, which Frasier is having difficulty organising. He remembers that Roz used to date a Microsoft executive, and hopes she can help, but it turns out that he resigned soon after Roz dumped him. While on a tour of KACL, Frederick meets Bulldog, who is in need of another player to join the softball team. Not wanting to disillusion the boy, Bulldog insists Frasier is an expert softball player, but that he is unavailable for the next game because of the Microsoft tour. Frederick informs his father he wants to see Frasier play in the softball game. Meanwhile, Niles is upset that Frederick has a crush on Daphne.
89	17	"Roz's Turn"	Joyce Gittlin	Joe Keenan	April 15, 1997	419	15.98
An on-air spot opens at KACL, and Roz decides to apply for it with Frasier's blessing. When the interview goes well, Frasier is happy for Roz but notes to Bebe that he will be very sorry to lose her if she does get the position. As a result, Bebe pulls strings to ensure Roz is taken out of the running. When Frasier finds out, he is furious and tries to fire Bebe, which she seeks to prevent.
90	18	"Ham Radio"	David Lee	David Lloyd	April 22, 1997	417	15.39
To help celebrate KACL's 50th anniversary, Frasier decides to stage a radio murder mystery and enlists several of his coworkers to act in it. However, his constant criticism and over-directing cause one cast member to storm out, forcing him to bring in Niles—-who has to read several parts, all in different accents, without benefit of rehearsal. The actual performance degenerates into chaos due to a string of mishaps and the script changes that Frasier makes on the fly to avoid overrunning.
91	19	"Three Dates and a Break Up"	Jeff Melman	Rob Greenberg	April 29, 1997	421	15.77
92	20	"Three Dates and a Break Up"	Jeff Melman	Rob Greenberg	April 29, 1997	422	15.77
At a benefit for the Seattle Theatre Ensemble, Frasier is approached by three attractive women in the course of the evening, and each one gives him her number. He therefore finds himself with a three-day weekend coming up and a date on each day. On the first date, Frasier claims to be a dog-lover and a vegetarian to impress his date, but Martin and Sherry come back early and reveal his deception. The following evening, Sherry accidentally reveals to the second date that Frasier had a date with a different woman the previous night. Martin has broken up with Sherry, and she calls by to drop something off, just before Frasier's third date arrives. Despite his worry that Sherry will wreck this date, Frasier tries to understand why Martin broke up with her, and finds out that it was due to Martin's guilt over falling in love with someone else other than his late wife. Guest Caller: David Benoit as Doug
93	21	"Daphne Hates Sherry"	Kelsey Grammer	Chuck Ranberg & Anne Flett-Giordano	May 6, 1997	423	14.66
A heat wave is sweeping Seattle, Frasier is battling the flu and in no mood to help anyone, Sherry is staying over with Martin more frequently, and Daphne is irritated by Sherry's constant undermining of her attempts to get Martin to do his exercises and eat healthier food. She then finds that Sherry has been giving her phone number to strangers to try to set her up, and storms out of the apartment. Unable to stay with friends, she goes to Niles' apartment, and asks to stay the night.
94	22	"Are You Being Served?"	Gordon Hunt	William Lucas Walker	May 13, 1997	416	16.26
Niles is in good spirits; his separation from Maris could soon be over, as he is suggesting marriage guidance counseling. However, a courier arrives with divorce papers. In a box of papers belonging to Martin, Frasier and Niles discover an old journal belonging to their late mother, which details with remarkable accuracy what appears to be the relationship between the brothers. Niles is shaken by his mother's assertion that he "constantly allows himself to be cowed and dominated, especially by females", and at this point reveals that he has not signed the divorce papers, but instead sent them back with a groveling letter. The brothers break into her house and retrieve the letter before she reads it. Determined not to be pushed around any more, Niles signs the divorce papers. However, upon further reading of their mother's notes, they realize that the Frasier and Niles she was describing are laboratory rats.
95	23	"Ask Me No Questions"	Jeff Melman	Dan Cohen & F. J. Pratt	May 20, 1997	418	19.23
Niles asks Frasier's opinion on whether he and Maris are meant to be together. Frasier evades the question, and while Niles continues to wait for an answer after the meeting, Frasier is plagued by indecision. He talks to Roz, who encourages him to support his brother; he talks to Martin, who says he should not underestimate how much Niles values his opinion; he talks to Marta the maid, who claims that Maris has changed; and he talks to Daphne, who warns him that Marta may just want Niles back. After walking the streets and being plagued by one indecision after another, Frasier heads over to his Niles' place and confesses that the latter and Maris are not meant to be together; he learns too late that his brother had been sleeping with her.
96	24	"Odd Man Out"	Jeff Melman	Suzanne Martin	May 20, 1997	424	20.01
Frasier has reservations at an Italian restaurant for dinner, to celebrate Roz's birthday. She tells him she has a date, so he offers the opportunity to Niles (who has plans with Maris), then Martin (who has plans with Sherry), then finally Daphne (who has a date). In the end, he turns up to the restaurant alone, and finds himself surrounded by couples. He returns home after dinner feeling depressed about being forty-three and single. However, he finds that his answering machine contains two messages from a woman called Laura, who is flying to Seattle that evening to meet her sister, and has called his number by mistake. He spontaneously decides to go to the airport to meet Laura (Linda Hamilton), assuming that she is single, but quickly discovers that she is happily married.
