= Frasier season 5 =

Frasier
- Season 5
- DVD cover
- Showrunner: Christopher Lloyd
- Starring: Kelsey Grammer; Jane Leeves; David Hyde Pierce; Peri Gilpin; Dan Butler; John Mahoney
- No. of episodes: 24

Release
- Original network: NBC
- Original release: September 23, 1997 – May 19, 1998

Season chronology
- ← Previous; Season 4 Next → Season 6

The fifth season of the American television sitcom Frasier aired on NBC from September 23, 1997 to May 19, 1998.

== Cast ==
=== Main ===
- Kelsey Grammer as Frasier Crane
- Jane Leeves as Daphne Moon
- David Hyde Pierce as Niles Crane
- Peri Gilpin as Roz Doyle
- John Mahoney as Martin Crane

=== Special guest ===
- Marsha Mason as Sherry
- Bebe Neuwirth as Lilith
- Sela Ward as Kelly Easterbrook
- Patti LuPone as Zora Crane
- Dan Butler as Bulldog

=== Recurring ===
- Edward Hibbert as Gil Chesterton

=== Guest ===
- Lindsay Frost as Samantha
- Conrad Janis as Albert
- Harriet Sansom Harris as Bebe Glazer
- Cynthia Lamontagne as Annie
- James Gleason as Ed
- Bill Campbell as Clint Webber
- James Patrick Stuart as Guy
- Lindsay Price as Sharon
- Lisa Edelstein as Caitlin
- Tom McGowan as Kenny
- Claire Yarlett as Vicky
- Lisa Waltz as Tricia
- Patrick Kerr as Noel Shempsky

=== Special appearance by ===
- Norman B. Rice, Mayor of Seattle as himself
- Larry King as himself
- Lesley Stahl as herself

== Episodes ==
No. overall	No. in season	Title	Directed by	Written by	Original release date	Prod. code	U.S. viewers (millions)
97	1	"Frasier's Imaginary Friend"	David Lee	Rob Greenberg	September 23, 1997	501	21.54
The story continues from the previous episode ("Odd Man Out"), after Frasier spontaneously decides to board a plane to Acapulco with Joanna. She soon switches seats after learning this. While reading a magazine, he realizes that the model in it is actually the woman sitting next to him on the plane, who introduces herself as Kelly Easterbrook (Sela Ward). She tells him she is a supermodel and a student of zoology. The pair begin dating, but Kelly asks him to not tell anyone about them, as she is currently breaking up with a football player and wants this kept out of the media. Niles, Daphne and Martin do not believe his claim to be dating a supermodel and believe that he is experiencing delusions.
98	2	"The Gift Horse"	Pamela Fryman	Ron Darian	September 30, 1997	502	19.56
It is Martin's 65th birthday, and Frasier and Niles compete to get him the best present. Sherry has big plans for his birthday party, and has found a picture of Martin back in his police days of him aboard his beloved police horse Agides, which she intends to blow up to life-size, with Martin recalling how much he used to love the horse. Frasier buys a very large television for Martin, but Niles has managed to track down Agides and secured him a stable where Martin can visit any time he likes. Frasier realizes Niles has won, and the pair take their father down to the stables to meet Agides. After the party, Niles and Frasier discover their father once again at the stables talking to Agides about the sadness of aging, which causes Niles to graciously say that Agides came from both him and Frasier.
99	3	"Halloween"	Pamela Fryman	Suzanne Martin	October 28, 1997	506	20.72
100	4	"The Kid"	Jeff Melman	Jeffrey Richman & Suzanne Martin	November 4, 1997	507	20.01
Part 1: Niles is throwing a literary-themed Halloween party, and Roz fears she might be pregnant. Frasier convinces Roz to go to Niles's party, hoping that will take her mind off her possible pregnancy. That night at the party, Frasier accidentally lets out that Roz might be pregnant and soon the wrong gossip spreads among the party guests. The entire ordeal ends with a drunken Niles proposing to Daphne, who he thinks is pregnant with Frasier's baby. Just as Frasier is attempting to reassure the party guests about what is really going on, Roz interrupts him. She lets everyone know that she has just heard from her doctor confirming the pregnancy. Camille Donatacci, who married Grammer two months before this episode aired, appears as "Eve." Guest Caller: Cindy Crawford as Dorothy Part 2: Following the events of the Halloween party, Frasier and Niles are full of contrition. Roz decides that she will keep the baby, but after initially claiming to have done so, admits that she has not told the father. Frasier finds the answer by chance at Café Nervosa, while being served by a cheerful young waiter called Rick. When Roz finally tells Rick, he is prepared to drop out of college and marry her, but Roz insists that he not change his plans and sends him away gently.
101	5	"The 1000th Show"	David Lee	Christopher Lloyd & Joe Keenan	November 11, 1997	504	18.82
Frasier's one thousandth radio broadcast is soon to take place. He initially claims that he does not want a large celebration, but cannot sustain his false modesty and seeks a celebration to mark the occasion. Frasier Crane Day is then proclaimed in Seattle, and a large public rally is organized for the broadcast, to take place at the Space Needle with the mayor in attendance. On the day, Frasier decides to take a leisurely stroll with Niles over to the rally. They leave in plenty of time but a series of disastrous events impedes his progress, and Roz is compelled to start the broadcast without him. Frasier finally manages to arrive at his rally thanks to a chauffeur who escorted him for free. In exchange, Frasier decides not to go to the rally and instead befriends the chauffeur, John, by listening to him confide about his familial situation for free.
102	6	"Voyage of the Damned"	Pamela Fryman	Jeffrey Richman	November 18, 1997	505	17.76
Frasier, Roz, Niles and Martin take a cruise to Alaska. Frasier is booked as the celebrity guest, and is disappointed when he discovers that the living quarters are abysmal, and there turns out to be no one on board wanting to see him, nor any other well-known entertainment acts. Roz is pursued by a 1970s dance musician, Carlos "The Barracuda" del Gato. Niles is on the cruise trying to forget his troubles; it is his wedding anniversary and he should have been with Maris, but she disappeared off to Switzerland. What he does not know is that Frasier left a message suggesting she join them, and she is aboard.
103	7	"My Fair Frasier"	Jeff Melman	Jay Kogen	November 25, 1997	503	17.75
Frasier meets Samantha Pierce (Lindsay Frost), a high-profile criminal defense attorney, while in a shop trying to return an unwanted gift for Roz. She actually comes to his rescue by persuading the shop assistant to give him store credit. He invites her to dinner to say thank you, and before they finish the hors d'œuvre she asked out of the blue if they could go somewhere and have sex. Over time, Frasier's family become confused when it emerges that he is the more submissive one in their relationship.
104	8	"Desperately Seeking Closure"	Pamela Fryman	Rob Hanning	December 9, 1997	512	17.82
Frasier has been enjoying sharing the glamorous lifestyle that Sam leads, having just spent a weekend in Aspen. He is taken aback when Sam breaks up with him over dinner the following day. She insists that it is nothing to do with him; only that she feels their relationship has run its course. Frasier is not convinced, and for a while afterwards agonizes over what he did wrong, or what aspect of his character she disliked.
105	9	"Perspectives on Christmas"	David Lee	Christopher Lloyd	December 16, 1997	510	19.23
The episode is mostly in the form of flashbacks from Martin, Daphne, Niles, and Roz in turn, who tell their stories while receiving massages (their Christmas present from Frasier). Christmas is approaching, and everyone in the Crane household has been having a miserable time. Martin has volunteered to play the part of a Wise Man in a local church pageant, and one of the requirements is to sing "O Holy Night", which contains one dangerously high note. He has not told Daphne, but she detects he is keeping something from her, and knowing that he was expecting the results of a recent physical examination, she fears the worst. Niles gets trapped in the Elliott Bay Towers elevator and has to climb out, completely ruining his brand new suit. Frasier takes a phone call from Roz's mother, who will be visiting for Christmas, and advises her to be sympathetic to Roz about her pregnancy weight gain, unaware that Roz has yet to tell her mother she is pregnant.
106	10	"Where Every Bloke Knows Your Name"	Jeff Melman	Rob Hanning	January 6, 1998	509	18.18
Frasier is losing interest in everything he and Niles do together, such as their wine clubs. He decides to try other things, such as Martin's poker game that night with Roz, Duke, Frank, Leo, and Jimmy. After giving up due to not understanding Duke's rules, Frasier goes with Daphne to an English pub, The Fox and Whistle. When Frasier starts going to the pub every night, Daphne feels that Frasier is invading her turf. Martin suggests she tell him, but when she does it is revealed Daphne has only been going there a month, just two more weeks than Frasier has. Frasier and Daphne decide to have a game of darts to see who will be the bar regular. Both do well, but Frasier, despite winning, is run out of the pub after making anti-British comments in the heat of battle.
107	11	"Ain't Nobody's Business If I Do"	David Lee	Jay Kogen	January 13, 1998	514	19.61
Daphne finds an engagement ring in Martin's underwear drawer. Frasier and Niles are shaken at the idea of Sherry becoming their stepmother, but they agree that their father's happiness is most important to them. Soon afterwards, Sherry tells Martin that someone has been asking questions about her at McGinty's, and Martin immediately thinks his sons have hired a private investigator to check up on her. They deny it, but Frasier realizes that Niles is guilty and insists that he call off the investigation. He does this, but before departing the detective presents him with a half-finished report, which the brothers read and discover that Sherry has already been married six times. Sherry does not wish to marry ever again, but Martin does, and the two break up due to their incompatible expectations.
108	12	"The Zoo Story"	Pamela Fryman	Joe Keenan	January 20, 1998	511	16.61
Frasier has to choose whether to return to his heartless former agent, Bebe Glazer, or stick with his current representative, well-meaning but non-confrontational Ben. Maris' insistence that Niles fire their latest couples' therapist, and Niles' refusal to do so, put their weekly conjugal visits on hiatus. Ben brings Frasier the wrong sort of publicity and Niles has trouble controlling his pent-up urges, but Frasier insists that both he and Niles do the ethical thing: Frasier must stay with his ethical agent, and Niles must not fire a perfectly good counselor just to have sex.
109	13	"The Maris Counselor"	Jeff Melman	David Lloyd	February 3, 1998	515	18.41
Niles's couples counseling with Maris is going well, and on the advice of their therapist, Dr. Schenkman, he is planning to surprise her that evening with a romantic evening. But he is horrified to discover that Maris is having an affair with Dr. Schenkman. Schenkman claims to be in love, and to have never met a warmer, kinder, more selfless soul. The shock and pain of this event reduce Niles to tears in the middle of a couples therapy session the next day, which Frasier is helping him to run. After some thought, Niles wonders if it could be a case of transference and decides to have one more attempt at talking to Maris. However, while approaching the house, he decides to make the separation final. Guest Callers: John Waters as Roger; Rob Reiner as Bill; Bess Myerson as Mary
110	14	"The Ski Lodge"	David Lee	Joe Keenan	February 24, 1998	518	17.55
Roz wins a free trip to a ski lodge, including lessons from a skiing instructor, but is talked into trading them to Frasier in return for a big-screen TV. So Frasier decides to take the whole family to the ski lodge, including Daphne and her friend Annie (played by guest star Cynthia Lamontagne), a swimsuit model. There they meet Guy (played by guest star James Patrick Stuart), a gay ski instructor, who likes Niles and thinks Niles likes him back. This is confirmed by misinformation given by Martin who has hearing difficulty due to a blocked ear. Throughout the episode, confusion arises as Frasier pursues Annie, who desires Niles. Niles, however, longs to confess his feelings for Daphne, while Daphne attempts to pick up Guy, who thinks that Daphne and Annie are together.
111	15	"Room Service"	David Lee	Ken Levine & David Isaacs	March 3, 1998	517	18.34
Lilith has come to Seattle to tell Frasier that her new husband has left her for the interior decorator. Frasier is worried, as they have been in this situation before, and he finds Lilith irresistible when she is vulnerable. He exhorts Niles to help him resist temptation, particularly when she goes to dinner with them wearing a very revealing new dress. But after getting drunk, it is Niles and Lilith who sleep together in her hotel room. Guest Caller: Halle Berry as Betsy
112	16	"Beware of Greeks"	Jeff Melman	David Lloyd	March 17, 1998	516	16.37
Frasier receives a visit at KACL from his half-Greek cousin, Nikos, who is planning to get married soon and wants Frasier, Martin and Niles to come to the wedding. They realize that his fearsome mother, Zora (guest star Patti LuPone), did not send the invitations. This is due to a long-standing rift between her and Frasier: five years ago, he advised Nikos to follow his preferred career (juggling) rather than go to medical school as Zora wanted. Since then, she refuses to speak to or acknowledge him, Niles or Martin at all, and she imposes the same restrictions on her husband Walt, Martin's brother. Consequently, Martin is not keen to attend the wedding, and neither is Niles, in case he runs into cousin Yvonne, who has a crush on him. Frasier, however, wants to see Nikos happy, and after accepting his invitation, manages to reconcile with Zora on condition that he never gives advice to Nikos again. He finds this promise harder to honor than he expected, when he deduces that Nikos' affections lie elsewhere. He gets involved once again, ignoring Zora's warning, and Nikos calls the wedding off. Zora, in a rage, attacks Frasier who flees while Martin and Walt say their goodbyes once more.
113	17	"The Perfect Guy"	Jeff Melman	Rob Greenberg	March 24, 1998	508	18.07
Dr. Clint Webber (guest star Billy Campbell) hosts a new show on KACL about health issues. All the women at the station find him extremely attractive, and Bulldog is not happy. Frasier himself decides that he can endure this man being more attractive than he is, assuming that there are other areas in which he surpasses Clint. Before long, though, he learns that Clint is also an old Oxonian, an expert squash player, fluent in French and a godson of José Carreras. Frasier maintains that he is not jealous, and tries to cultivate a friendship with Clint, but the list of his skills and abilities seems to grow over time. Eventually, when as a guest on Frasier's radio show, Clint interposes an alternative diagnosis for a caller and she prefers it, Frasier changes his tune, and thereafter refuses to rest until he has discovered just one flaw or deficiency. Guest Caller: Jill Clayburgh as Marie
114	18	"Bad Dog"	Pamela Fryman	Suzanne Martin	April 7, 1998	513	15.93
While waiting in a long line at Café Nervosa, Frasier spots a man who has a gun. In the chaos that follows, it appears that Bulldog acts heroically when he pulls Roz out of the way and causes the gunman to flee. The other patrons of the café proclaim him a hero, and the story appears later on the news. Frasier, however, saw that rather than bravely pushing Roz out of the way, Bulldog attempted to use her as a human shield, defusing the robbery attempt entirely by accident. Frasier tells Bulldog to own up to the deception, but Bulldog refuses, and learns (on-air) that he will receive a special Man of the Year award for his actions. At the award ceremony, Martin shouts that he sees a man with a gun. Bulldog uses his own mother as a human shield in his panic, revealing his dishonesty.
115	19	"Frasier Gotta Have It"	Dan Butler	Rob Greenberg	April 21, 1998	520	16.11
Frasier begins a steamy love affair with Caitlin (played by guest star Lisa Edelstein), a free-spirited artist. Whenever they are together they have wonderful sex, but hardly any conversation. Niles tries to get Frasier to admit that the relationship is based solely on sex, but Frasier insists that he has a real future with Caitlin. Frasier begins to obsess about this, and wonders if he should carry on with the relationship. Martin, Roz and Daphne all share with Frasier their memories of relationships that were steamy but superficial. Frasier is convinced that he must break up with Caitlin and goes to her loft to tell her. However, after howling at the Moon, carnal desires overwhelm Frasier again.
116	20	"First Date"	Kelsey Grammer	Rob Hanning	April 28, 1998	522	19.31
Niles decides to ask Daphne out on a date, only to lose his nerve. When he and Frasier discuss the situation, Daphne overhears that Niles is in love. Niles fabricates an infatuation with his neighbor, Phyllis. A supportive Daphne insists he ask the woman out, so Niles pretends to arrange a date. Daphne unexpectedly arrives to help Niles set up an intimate dinner, and Phyllis happens to arrive as well. Frasier scares Phyllis off by intimating Niles murdered his first wife, leaving Niles alone with Daphne, who thinks Phyllis intuited Niles was unready for a new relationship. Realizing that this might truly be the case, and after Daphne mentions she would not date a man going through a divorce, Niles asks Daphne to join him for the meal she prepared, and they sit down together for a companionable dinner.
117	21	"Roz and the Schnoz"	Ken Levine	Jeffrey Richman	May 5, 1998	523	16.66
Roz stays with Frasier while her apartment is being painted. She agrees to meet the Garrets, the parents of her baby's father Rick. Martin is off to San Francisco for the weekend with Duke, to relive a Korean War furlough they once shared, but cuts his trip short after finding the city completely changed. Martin, Frasier, Niles, and Daphne all are unable to maintain their composure upon seeing Steve and Paula Garrett's absurdly large noses. After learning that Rick was born with a similar nose, but had a nose job, Roz worries that her baby will inherit Rick's nose, as well as her own awkward features that she had cosmetically altered.
118	22	"The Life of the Party"	Jeff Melman	Suzanne Martin & Jeffrey Richman	May 12, 1998	519	15.61
Frasier and Niles realize that they are both in a rut with their love lives and on the advice of Martin decide to throw a singles party. At the party, both compete over the same woman. Meanwhile Martin is having problems of his own; after dyeing his hair on the advice of Daphne he realizes that it has run and stained one of Niles' expensive chairs; Roz also finds a lack of interest from men due to her pregnancy. Halfway through the evening, Roz's waters break and she is rushed to the hospital, where she gives birth to a daughter, Alice May Doyle. Frasier, Martin, Niles and Daphne all turn up to see her. The group leaves a sleeping Roz with her baby.
119	23	"Party, Party"	Jeff Melman	David Lloyd	May 19, 1998	521	17.73
Frasier arrives 45 minutes late for a meeting at Café Nervosa with Tricia, a young woman he met at the opera. He grovels and suggests lunch the next day at Le Petit Bistro, and she agrees before dashing off. The next day, his car breaks down and he misses the second date with Tricia, but leaves an apologetic message offering any other time if she will only give him one more chance. She calls and says she is leaving town that evening for Spokane. While trying to see her before she leaves town, Frasier has many things get in his way, including a surprise party for his birthday thrown by Martin and Daphne. He finally meets Tricia outside her apartment and offers to drive her to Spokane, but is dismayed to find that she is a member of a cult.
120	24	"Sweet Dreams"	Sheldon Epps	Jay Kogen	May 19, 1998	524	21.30
Bulldog and Gil are recording an advertisement for a new sponsor at KACL: Happy Dreams tea, which promises pleasant dreams to anyone drinking it. When he hears this, Frasier is disgusted. When the new station manager instructs him to read the same sponsor advert, he objects on principle and makes a stand on air. This results in him being fired, but the new manager, Kenny, is impressed that Frasier upheld his principles, and decides to confront the station owner, Joe Martin (Miguel Sandoval), about the spot, while asking Frasier to return to work. Kenny is fired as a result. Frasier feels responsible and decides to act once more. He and the other on-air talent of KACL approach Joe Martin. Frasier talks with him and convinces him that he needs to take risks. Martin agrees with Frasier and reveals that his true name is Jose Martinez. He informs everyone that KACL will become a 24/7 Latino music station, and all the current hosts are fired. During the closing credits, the main theme is replaced with a Salsa version. Guest Caller: John McEnroe as Patrick
