= Jeff Melman =

American television director and producer

- Born: Jeffrey L. Melman; May 18, 1947 (age 79); Harrisburg, Pennsylvania, U.S.
- Other name: Jeffrey Melman
- Occupations: Television director, producer
- Years active: 1976–present

Jeffrey L. Melman (born May 18, 1947) is an American television director and producer. Melman has directed for several present-day network television series. More recently Melman has directed episodes of ABC's Grey's Anatomy, Private Practice and Desperate Housewives. Melman previously directed on many hit sitcoms which include The Fresh Prince of Bel-Air, Malcolm in the Middle, Everybody Loves Raymond, That's My Bush!, The King of Queens, Two and a Half Men and Frasier. Melman was also a producer on Oliver Beene, Laverne & Shirley, and Night Court.

== Filmography ==
- Private Practice (2007) TV series
  - episode 1.07 "In Which Sam Gets Taken For a Ride"
  - episode 2.09 "Know When to Fold"
- Everybody Hates Chris
  - episode 1.21 "Everybody Hates Jail"
- Ugly Betty (2006) TV series
  - episode 1.17 "Icing on the Cake"
- Grey's Anatomy (2005) TV series
  - episode 2.06 "Into You Like a Train"
  - episode 2.23 "Blues for Sister Someone"
  - episode 3.02 "I Am a Tree"
  - episode 3.05 "Oh, the Guilt"
  - episode 3.08 "Staring at the Sun"
  - episode 4.07 "Physical Attraction Chemical Reaction"
- Hot Properties (2005) TV series
  - episode "Online Dating"
  - episode "It's a Wonderful Christmas Carol on 34th Street"
  - episode "When Chloe Met Marco"
  - episode "Whatever Lola Wants"
  - episode "Return of the Ring"
  - episode "Dating Up, Dating Down"
  - episode "Waiting For Oprah"
- Living With Fran (2005) TV series
- Desperate Housewives (2004) TV series
  - episode 1.04 "Who's That Woman?"
  - episode 1.14 "Love Is in the Air"
  - episode 1.17 "There Won't Be Trumpets"
  - episode 1.20 "Fear No More"
- Two and a Half Men (2003) TV series
  - episode 5.17 "Fish in a Drawer"
  - episode 5.19 "Waiting for the Right Snapper"
  - episode 6.08 "Pinocchio's Mouth"
  - episode 6.09 "The Mooch at the Boo"
  - episode 6.10 "He Smelled the Ham, He Got Excited"
  - episode 6.11 "The Devil's Lube"
  - episode 6.12 "Thank God for Scoliosis"
  - episode 6.13 "I Think You Offended Don"
  - episode 6.14 "David Copperfield Slipped Me a Roofie"
  - episode 6.15 "I'd Like to Start with the Cat"
  - episode 6.16 "She'll Still Be Dead at Halftime"
- Arrested Development (2003) TV series
  - episode 2.04 "Good Grief!"
- Sixteen to Life (2003) TV series
- Luis (2003) TV series
  - episode 1.01 "Pilot"
- Oliver Beene (2003) TV series
- Exit 9 (2003) TV series
- Off Centre (2001) TV series
- Scrubs (2001) TV series
  - episode 1.11 "My Own Personal Jesus"
- That's My Bush! (2001) TV series
- Titus (2000) TV series
  - episode "Tommy's Girlfriend II"
- Malcolm in the Middle (2000) TV series
  - episode 1.05 "Malcolm Babysits"
  - episode 1.15 "Smunday"
  - episode 2.04 "Dinner Out"
  - episode 2.06 "Convention"
  - episode 2.09 "High School Play"
  - episode 2.10 "The Bully"
  - episode 2.16 "Traffic Ticket"
  - episode 2.17 "Surgery"
  - episode 2.18 "Reese Cooks"
  - episode 2.25 "Flashback"
  - episode 3.05 "Charity"
  - episode 3.07 "Christmas"
  - episode 3.10 "Lois's Makeover"
  - episode 3.13 "Reese Drives"
  - episode 3.16 "Hal Coaches"
  - episode 3.18 "Poker #2"
  - episode 3.21 "Cliques"
  - episode 4.02 "Humilithon"
  - episode 4.07 "Malcolm Holds His Tongue"
  - episode 4.12 "Kicked Out"
  - episode 4.14 "Hal's Friend"
- Stark Raving Mad (1999) TV series
- The Parkers (1999) TV series
- Becker (1998) TV series
- Encore! Encore! (1998) TV series
- The King of Queens (1998) TV series
  - episode 3.04 "Class Struggle"
- Holding the Baby (1998)TV series
- LateLine (1998) TV series
- Jenny (1997) TV series
- Veronica's Closet (1997) TV series
  - episode "Veronica's Thanksgiving That Keeps on Giving"
- Fired Up (1997) TV series
- Just Shoot Me! (1997) TV series
- Sabrina the Teenage Witch (1996) TV series
  - episode 4.03 "Jealousy"
  - episode 4.10 "Ice Station Sabrina"
  - episode 4.15 "Love in Bloom"
  - episode 4.17 "Salem's Daughter"
  - episode 5.02 "Double Time"
  - episode 6.15 "Time After Time"
  - episode 6.16 "Sabrina and the Kiss"
  - episode 7.04 "Shift Happens"
- Men Behaving Badly (1996) TV series
- Everybody Loves Raymond (1996) TV series
  - episode 2.20 "T-Ball"
  - episode 2.22 "Six Feet Under"
  - episode 2.23 "The Garage Sale"
  - episode 2.24 & 2.25: "The Wedding, Parts One & Two"
- The Pursuit of Happiness (1995) TV series
- Almost Perfect (1995) TV series
- Saved by the Bell: Wedding in Las Vegas (1994) TV film
- The George Carlin Show (1994) TV series
- Frasier (1993) TV series
  - episode 3.06 "Sleeping with the Enemy"
  - episode 4.02 "Love Bites Dog"
  - episode 4.04 "A Cranes' Critique"
  - episode 4.06 "Mixed Doubles"
  - episode 4.07 "A Lilith Thanksgiving "
  - episode 4.08 "Our Father Whose Art Ain't Heaven"
  - episode 4.13 "Four for the Seesaw"
  - episode 4.15 "Roz's Krantz & Gouldenstein are Dead"
  - episode 4.19 "Three Dates and a Breakup, Part 1"
  - episode 4.20 "Three Dates and a Breakup, Part 2"
  - episode 4.23 "Ask Me No Questions"
  - episode 4.24 "Odd Man Out"
  - episode 5.04 "Kid, The"
  - episode 5.07 "My Fair Frasier"
  - episode 5.10 "Where Every Bloke Knows Your Name"
  - episode 5.13 "The Maris Counselor"
  - episode 5.16 "Beware of Greeks"
  - episode 5.17 "Perfect Guy, The"
  - episode 5.22 "The Life of the Party"
  - episode 5.23 "Party, Party"
- Saved by the Bell: The College Years (1993) TV series
- Flying Blind (1992) TV series
- Melrose Place (1992) TV series
- Red Dwarf (1992) (TV)
- Charlie Hoover (1991) TV series
- Beverly Hills, 90210 (1990) TV series
  - episode "Dead End"
  - episode "Dealer's Choice"
  - episode "The Girl from New York City"
  - episode "Misery Loves Company"
  - episode "Sex, Lies and Volleyball/Photo Fini"
  - episode "A Song for Myself"
- The Fresh Prince of Bel-Air (1990) TV series
- Parker Lewis Can't Lose (1990) TV series
  - episode 1.11 "Radio Free Flamingo"
  - episode 2.05 "Undergraduate, The"
- Wings (1990) TV series
- A Family for Joe (1990) TV series
- Sister Kate (1989) TV series
- Hooperman (1987) TV series
- My Two Dads (1987) TV series
- Night Court (1984) TV series
- Making the Grade (1982) TV series
