= Two and a Half Deaths =

- CSI: Crime Scene Investigation episode
- Episode no.: Season 8 Episode 16
- Directed by: Alec Smight
- Written by: Chuck Lorre; * Lee Aronsohn
- Original air date: May 8, 2008

Guest appearances
- Katey Sagal; Diedrich Bader; Rachael Harris; Constance Marie; Benjamin King; Stephen Tobolowsky; Charlie Sheen (uncredited); Jon Cryer (uncredited); Angus T. Jones (uncredited); Dayna Devon (reporting for Extra)

Episode chronology
← Previous "The Theory of Everything"	Next → "For Gedda"
- CSI: Crime Scene Investigation (season 8)

"Two and a Half Deaths" is the sixteenth episode of the eighth season of the American crime drama CSI: Crime Scene Investigation, which is set in Las Vegas. The 181st episode of the series overall, it originally aired on May 8, 2008 on CBS. It was written by Chuck Lorre and Lee Aronsohn in a crossover between CSI and Two and a Half Men. The character of Annabelle is based on Roseanne Barr, who Lorre believed behaved poorly while he was running her eponymous blockbuster TV show; the title font for the show-within-a-show "Annabelle" is even identical to the one used for Roseanne. Lorre was the original producer for that show until he was pushed out.

== Plot ==
When the death of a well-known TV star, Annabelle (Katey Sagal), is reported, the CSI team is sent to investigate. Annabelle's co-star, Megan, is interviewed, saying what a tragedy it was. Warrick points out to Grissom and Catherine that a woman's high heel print can clearly be seen in the blood from Annabelle's room. When Grissom gets a phone call that something has turned up on the television set, he heads to Los Angeles.

When Grissom arrives, he finds Natasha (Annabelle's stand-in/double), dead from a car accident. Minutes later, Megan screams out as her dog lies dead in front of her. Back in Vegas, Hodges shows Catherine footage of Bud Parker (Annabelle's driver and now the show's "executive producer") marrying Annabelle, that is actually Natasha. Grissom and Brass search Bud's office and find alcohol, which he has been giving to Annabelle. They also let him know that semen was found on Natasha before she died, trying to pin her murder on him. Bud does not answer any questions, but instead is led away by police until he is ready to talk.

Catherine finds out that a writer visited Annabelle's room and had the same water bottle on him that she found at the scene of the crime. That writer has not been seen since the show filmed in Vegas. The bottle is dusted for prints and the CSI team come up with the name Richard Langford, an actor and street performer. As the team hands out pictures on the street to find him, Richard is performing on the street as a robot and tries to get away. Warrick and Nick arrest him.

Nick interviews Richard, who says that he was going to become a regular on her sitcom but was dismissed when he refused to sleep with Annabelle. He went to Vegas to get a second chance and decided to sleep with her after all. She fell backwards, hit her head, and died, which was an accident, according to him. He says that the rubber chicken stuffed down her throat was not an accident, but intentional since she was already dead.

The corpse of Annabelle tests positive for blood thinners, and the team realizes that she had been poisoned for quite some time prior to her death. The same drug is found in Natasha's blood. Grissom and Brass figure out that the only other person, besides Bud, who knew about Annabelle hiding her alcohol in mouthwash bottles was Megan. She confesses hypothetically by placing her actions on a fictional character in a script. In it, she reveals that she had had help from an Italian uncle, "Giuseppe", who taught her how to sabotage Annabelle's car in exchange for what she called "unsavory favors". She later asserts that there is only circumstantial evidence implicating her, and reveals that she has a new TV series called "Megan's Family". She then introduces her lover/executive producer, one of the show producers, who was constantly humiliated by Annabelle and Bud, who appears on cue. So with no proof, they do not arrest her. While shaving, Bud cuts himself and bleeds profusely from the neck as the screen cuts to black.

== Connections with Two and a Half Men ==
- As Grissom and Brass are driven through a studio backlot to a crime scene, they spot Charlie Sheen (smoking a cigarette), Jon Cryer (smoking a tobacco pipe) and Angus T. Jones (biting the end off a cigar) outside a trailer wearing the same clothes from "Fish in a Drawer". All were stars of the CBS series Two and a Half Men at the time of the episode's production, making uncredited cameo appearances.
- The character of Don (one of the writers of the "Annabelle" show) is played by Kevin Sussman who plays the character of Stuart, owner of the comic book store frequently featured on The Big Bang Theory, another Chuck Lorre show. In a discussion about writing he asks the other writers if any of them has ever contacted Two and a Half Men. Another writer answers "Ecch! I'd rather sleep with Annabelle than write that crap!"
- The title of this episode is a parody of the Two and a Half Men name whose creators, Chuck Lorre and Lee Aronsohn, wrote this episode.
- To reciprocate, the writers of CSI wrote a Two and a Half Men episode, "Fish in a Drawer", which aired on CBS on May 5, 2008.
- J. D. Walsh also appears as another of the writers of the "Annabelle" show. In Two and a Half Men he stars as Gordon, a pizza delivery guy who appears in seasons 1–3 and season 6 onwards.
