= Fish in a Drawer =

- Two and a Half Men episode
- Episode no.: Season 5 Episode 17
- Directed by: Jeff Melman
- Written by: Evan Dunsky; Sarah Goldfinger; Carol Mendelsohn; Naren Shankar
- Production code: 3T6267
- Original air date: May 5, 2008

Guest appearances
- John Burke as one of the interrogators; George Eads as a guest in the wedding reception; Jenny McCarthy as Courtney Leopold/Sylvia Fishman; Jamie Rose as one of the interrogators; Robert Wagner as Teddy Leopold/Nathan Krunk

Episode chronology
← Previous "Look at Me, Mommy, I'm Pretty"	Next → "If My Hole Could Talk"
- Two and a Half Men season 5

"Fish in a Drawer" is the seventeenth episode of the fifth season of the American sitcom Two and a Half Men and the 113th episode overall. The episode was written by Evan Dunsky, Sarah Goldfinger, Carol Mendelsohn and Naren Shankar, the writers of CSI: Crime Scene Investigation, who swapped shows with the writing staff of Two and a Half Men.

The episode revolves around Teddy Leopold (Robert Wagner), who is found dead on Charlie (Charlie Sheen)'s bed during his mother's wedding reception. A crime scene investigation crew searches Charlie's house, trying to find out who murdered Teddy. "Fish in a Drawer" aired May 5, 2008, on CBS, and was watched by approximately 13 million viewers, making it the night's third most watched show, behind CSI: Miami and Dancing with the Stars.

== Plot ==
At the reception of Evelyn and Teddy's wedding, Charlie decides to marry Courtney, his new stepsister, and leads her up to his room. When they lie down on the bed, in the dark, Courtney discovers that she is lying on something, when Charlie turns on the light, he finds Teddy lying dead on his bed with his pants around his knees, and lipstick on his "Hoo Hoo". When Charlie tells Alan, they know they have an even bigger problem: telling their mother. After pulling Evelyn away from the piano, they tell her, and she then cashes in their honeymoon tickets for a trip for one to Fiji before calling the police.

After the police arrive and examine the crime scene, Charlie, Alan, Evelyn, Berta, Courtney, and Jake are brought to the station for separate statements. Charlie becomes sexually attracted to the female interrogator (Jamie Rose), Alan is afraid of going to jail and struggles to talk, Evelyn spends more time complaining about the coffee, Berta is unhelpful in her answers, and Jake talks about food. It soon appears to be Evelyn as the prime suspect, since almost all of her prior husbands had died. Evelyn mentions her first husband died from food poisoning, explaining she was a young bride, just learning to cook, and didn't know you couldn't "keep fish in a drawer".

After the files of Teddy and his daughter Courtney come back, the crime team discovers that their real names are Nathan Krunk and Sylvia Fishman, and they are not related. It turns out that Sylvia and Nathan were con artists. The crime team thought that Nathan was murdered, because of the bruise on the back of his head, but it was revealed that he died of a heart attack, while attempting to have sex with Sylvia. The bruise had occurred two days earlier, when he bumped his head while having sex with Sylvia. As the police lead Sylvia away, Charlie plans to berate her for lying to him, but he can only manage to say "I'll wait for you."

== Production ==
In the worst-case scenario it's just an oddity. It's like the last episode of The Prisoner, where everything just went all crazy. It could be something people will discuss for the next 40 years.

— Jon Cryer

In 2007, Chuck Lorre, the creator of Two and a Half Men, contacted Carol Mendelsohn, the show runner of CSI: Crime Scene Investigation, about a crossover. The first reactions to this were that it was a stupid idea. CSI writer and executive producer Naren Shankar commented that when Mendelsohn first told him about the idea he replied: "What a nut". However, that same year, the idea resurfaced, when Lorre and Mendelsohn met at the World Television Festival in Banff. Upon hearing this, the cast of both shows were surprised and not interested, but they eventually jumped aboard. In an interview with The New York Post, before the idea was fully worked out, Mendelsohn described the possible crossover as "a great challenge".

When Mendelsohn was giving a talk, she accidentally mentioned the crossover, as a result Variety was already inquiring about the crossover episodes that same day. Mendelsohn eventually revealed the crossover at the Banff event in Canada. After the episode was taped, Lorre stated: "The biggest challenge for us was doing a comedy with a murder in it. Generally, our stories are a little lighter. Would our audience go with a dead body in it? There was a moment where it could have gone either way. I think the results were spectacular. It turned out to be a really funny episode." "Fish in a Drawer" was written by Carol Mendelsohn and Naren Shankar and directed by Jeff Melman. As an inside joke, George Eads, who plays crime scene investigator Nick Stokes on CSI made a cameo as a guest at the wedding reception. Three days after the initial airing of "Fish in a Drawer", "Two and a Half Deaths", the corresponding CSI episode, aired on CBS. However, in an early Zap2it interview, both Mendelsohn and Lorre stated that this might be the last time a crossover like this might occur.

== Reception ==
"Fish in a Drawer" was broadcast on May 5, 2008 on CBS, and was watched by 13.61 million viewers, that night beating The Big Bang Theory with 7.38 million viewers and making it the night's third most watched show, behind CSI: Miami and Dancing with the Stars. The episode was the fifth most watched program on CBS in the week of May 5 to May 11, 2008.

Allison Waldman of AOL's TV Squad, stated that she found the corresponding CSI: Crime Scene Investigation episode Emmy Award worthy, while she found "Fish in a Drawer", "not rip-roaring, but still good". Andy Grieser of Zap2it, said that he was attracted to the episode due to the news about the crossover, he stated he found the Faux-Catherine "brilliant" and that "the grainy flashbacks were the best parts".

Conchata Ferrell submitted this episode for consideration for the Primetime Emmy Award for Outstanding Supporting Actress in a Comedy Series for the 60th Primetime Emmy Awards but did not end up being nominated. The director of this episode, Jeff Melman, also submitted this episode for consideration for Outstanding Directing for a Comedy Series, but was not nominated either.
