= Angus T. Jones =

American actor (born 1993)

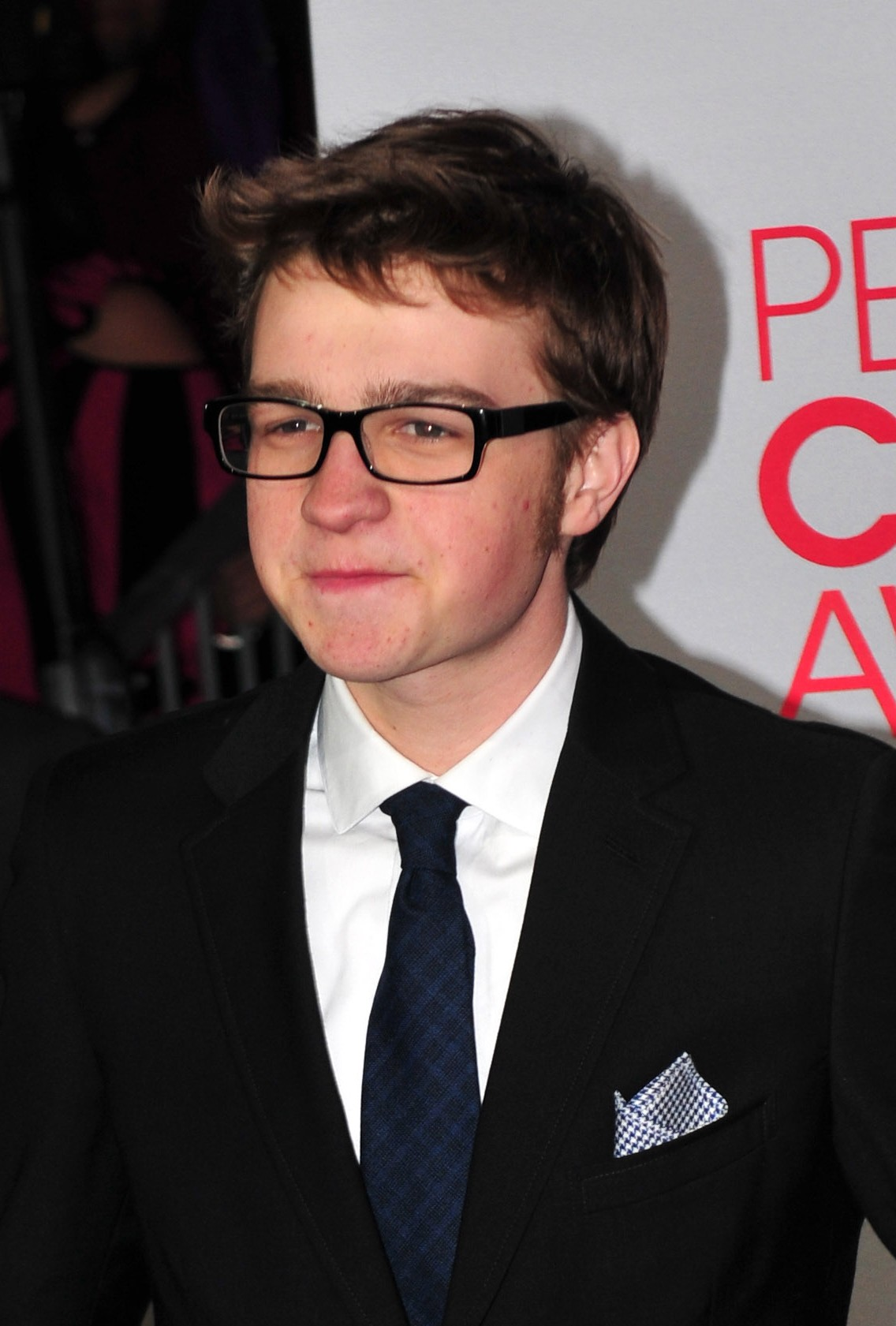
- Jones at the 38th People's Choice Awards in January 2012
- Born: Angus Turner Jones; October 8, 1993 (age 33); Austin, Texas, U.S.
- Education: University of Colorado Boulder
- Occupation: Actor
- Years active: 1999–2016, 2023
- Known for: Jake Harper in Two and a Half Men
- Awards: Young Artist Award 2004, 2006 Two and a Half Men; TV Land Award 2009 Two and a Half Men

Angus Turner Jones (born October 8, 1993) is an American former actor. Jones made his film debut in Simpatico (1999) at the age of six and followed with roles in the films See Spot Run (2001), The Rookie (2002) and Bringing Down the House (2003). He gained mainstream recognition in the 2000s for playing Jake Harper on the CBS sitcom Two and a Half Men (2003–2013), for which he won two Young Artist Awards and a TV Land Award.

== Career ==
Jones's first film role was as a five-year-old in the 1999 film Simpatico. From 2001 to 2003, he had supporting roles in films including See Spot Run, The Rookie, Bringing Down the House, George of the Jungle 2, and The Christmas Blessing.

=== Two and a Half Men ===
In 2003, Jones was cast in the sitcom Two and a Half Men as Jake Harper, the "half man" of the title, a 10-year-old living with his divorced father (played by Jon Cryer) and hedonistic uncle (played by Charlie Sheen). The show was the most popular sitcom in the United States for most of its run, with an average audience of around 15 million people.

In 2010, Jones became the highest paid child star in television at the age of 17 when his new contract with Two and a Half Men guaranteed him US$7.8 million over the next two seasons, amounting to US$300,000 for each of the 26 episodes.

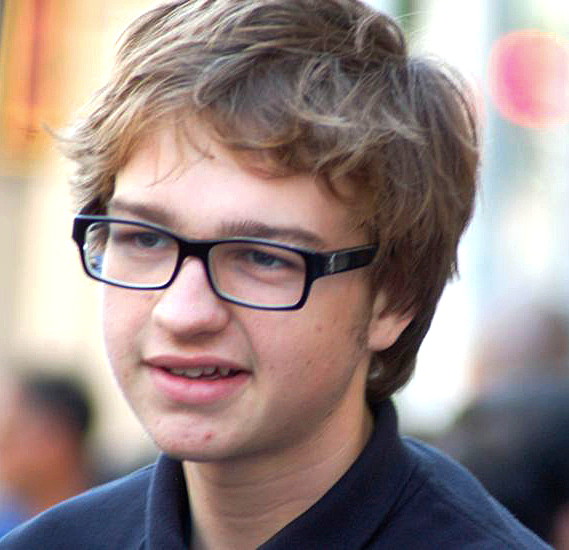
Jones in 2011

During the show's ninth season, which ran from 2011 to 2012, Jones' character Jake was given more adult storylines: he was portrayed as a heavy marijuana user, as well as being sexually active both with girls his own age and older women. The final episode of season 9 shows Jake graduating from high school and joining the army. At the annual PaleyFest held in Los Angeles, California, in March 2012, Jones, who turned 18 during the ninth season, said that he was uncomfortable with the new storylines, saying that it was "very awkward" to do the "adult thing" while not an adult.

In November 2012, Jones said that he had been baptized and no longer wanted to appear on Two and a Half Men, calling the show "filth" and saying it conflicted with his religious views. He also encouraged people to stop watching the show. His views gained the attention of the media after Jones appeared in a video posted on the YouTube channel of ForeRunner Chronicles, an independent ministry run by Christopher Hudson. Jones issued a statement the next day saying that he was grateful to have worked on the show.

Soon afterwards, the Seventh-day Adventist Church in North America released a statement indicating that the Forerunner Chronicles is not associated with the Adventist Church and that Hudson is not an ordained Seventh-day Adventist pastor.

Producers for the show said he was not expected back on the set until 2013, as his character does not appear in the last few episodes of season 10. CBS announced in April 2013 that he would be downgraded to recurring status for season 11, but ultimately he did not appear at all during Season 11. He was replaced on the show by Amber Tamblyn. On March 18, 2014, Angus T. Jones officially announced his departure from the show, stating he had been "a paid hypocrite". However, he returned in a cameo for the series finale in Season 12, "Of Course He's Dead", which aired February 19, 2015.

== Personal life ==
In October 2012, Jones described his path to a newfound religious faith in detail during an interview with a Seventh-day Adventist–sponsored Voice of Prophecy radio program.

In 2016, Jones joined the management team of Tonite, a multimedia and event production company started by Justin Combs and Kene Orjioke.

In 2016, Jones stated he was no longer a member of faith-based "business-model" organizations, and expressed an interest in returning to acting.

Jones attended University of Colorado Boulder after departing Two and a Half Men.

=== Charity work ===
On June 7, 2008, Jones lent his support to the First Star Organization to help abused and neglected children. Two months later, he joined other celebrities at the annual "Rock 'N Roll Fantasy Camp". On October 4 of that year, Jones attended the Variety's Power of Youth benefit for St. Jude Children's Research Hospital in Memphis, Tennessee.

In October 2009, Two and a Half Men co-star Jon Cryer presented Jones with the award for the Rising Star of 2009 at the Big Brothers Big Sisters Rising Star Gala.

Jones has supported the anti-bullying alliance Be A Star co-founded by The Creative Coalition and WWE.

== Filmography ==
=== Films ===
Year	Title	Role	Notes
1999	Simpatico	"Five-year-old kid"	
2001	See Spot Run	James McGuire	
2002	The Rookie	Hunter Morris	
2003	Bringing Down the House	Georgie Sanderson	
2003	George of the Jungle 2	George Jr.	Direct-to-video
2010	Due Date	Jake Harper	

=== Television ===
Year	Title	Role	Notes
2001	ER	Sean Gattney	Episode: "Quo Vadis?"
2001	Dinner with Friends	Sammy	Television film
2003	Audrey's Rain	Tye Powell	Television film
2003–2013; 2015	Two and a Half Men	Jake Harper	226 episodes
2005	The Christmas Blessing	Charlie Bennett	Television film
2005	Big Brother 6	Himself	Guest appearance
2008	CSI: Crime Scene Investigation	Himself	Episode: "Two and a Half Deaths"
2010	Hannah Montana	T.J.	Episode: "Sweet Home Hannah Montana"
2016	Horace and Pete	Horace, the 9th	Episode: "10"
2023	Bookie	Himself	Episode: "Always Smell the Money"

== Awards ==
Year	Result	Award	Category	Work
2002	Nominated	Young Artist Awards	Best Performance in a Feature Film: Young actor age 10 or younger	See Spot Run
2003	Nominated	Young Artist Awards	Best Performance in a Feature Film: Young actor age 10 or younger	The Rookie
2003	Won	Character and Morality Entertainment Awards	Carmie Award	The Rookie
2004	Won	Young Artist Awards	Best Performance in a TV Series: (Comedy or Drama): Young actor age 10 or younger	Two and a Half Men
2006	Won	Young Artist Awards	Best Performance in a TV Series (Comedy): Supporting Young Actor	Two and a Half Men
2008	Nominated	Young Artist Awards	Best Performance in a TV Series: Leading Young Actor	Two and a Half Men
2009	Won	TV Land Awards	Future Classic Award	Two and a Half Men
