= Evan Dunsky =

American television writer, producer and director

- Born: Chicago, Illinois
- Occupations: Film and Television writer, producer, director
- Spouse: Lisa Zimble

Evan Dunsky is an American television writer, producer and director.

Evan Dunsky wrote and directed the 1997 feature film The Alarmist based on the play Life During Wartime by Keith Reddin. He was one of the writers of the episode "Fish in a Drawer" for Two and a Half Men in 2008. A writer/producer for CSI: Crime Scene Investigation since 2006, Dunsky co-created and wrote the original pilot episode of the Showtime series Nurse Jackie with Linda Wallem and Liz Brixius in 2008. Starring Edie Falco of The Sopranos, the half-hour drama about a "flawed" emergency room nurse in a New York City hospital premiered on Showtime in June 2009 and has recently finished its sixth season. Falco won the Emmy for her role on the show, and Dunsky was a recipient of the 2010 Humanitas Prize.
