= Naren Shankar =

American television writer, producer, and director

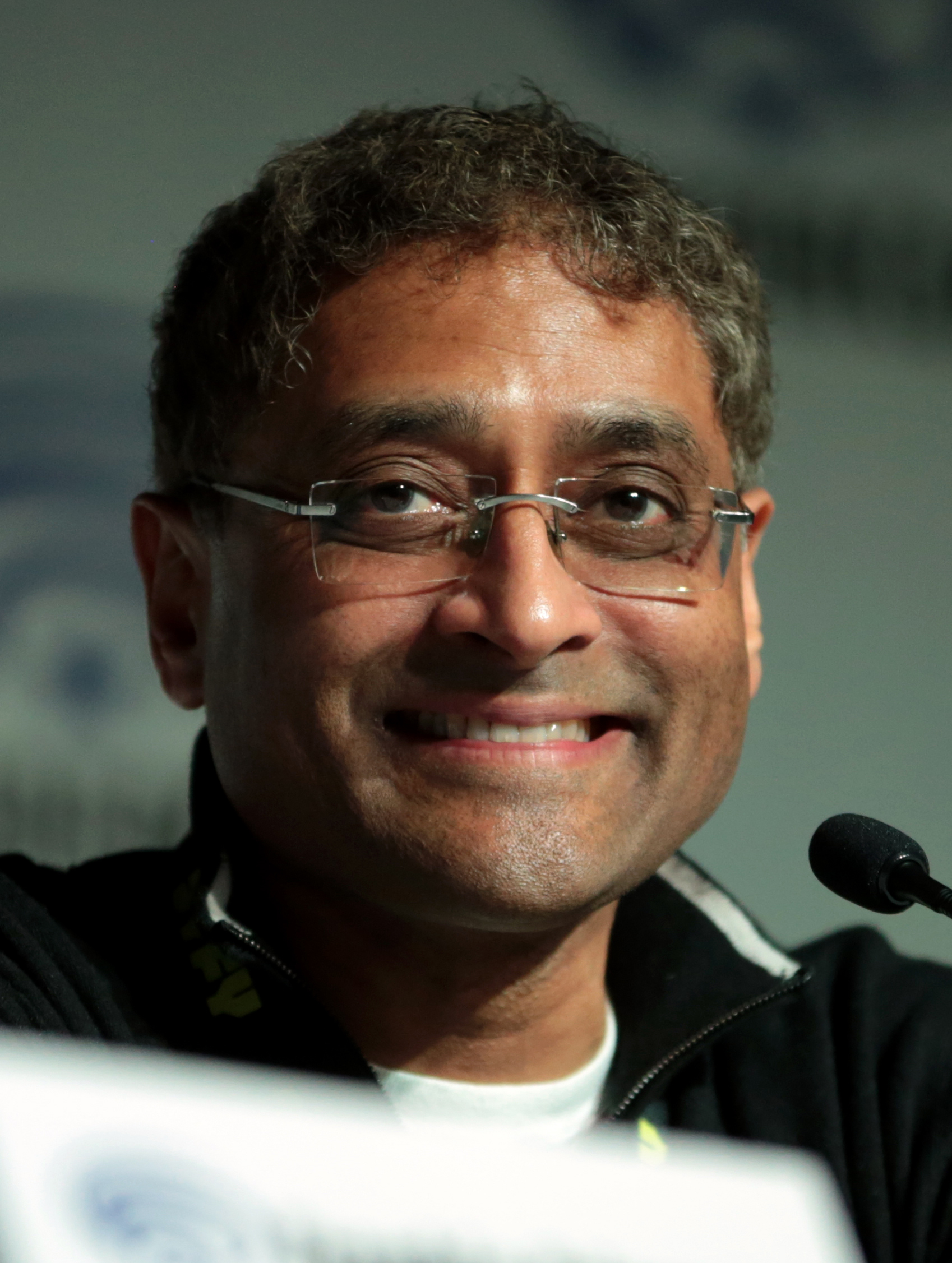
- Shankar in March 2018
- Born: Narendra Kanakaiah Shankar; April 1, 1964 (age 62)
- Education: Cornell University (B.S., M.S., Ph.D.)
- Occupations: Television writer; television producer; television director
- Notable work: Star Trek; The Expanse; CSI; Almost Human

Narendra Kanakaiah "Naren" Shankar (born April 1, 1964) is an American writer, producer and director of several television series. He was co-showrunner of the Syfy/Amazon Prime Video series The Expanse. He was also co-showrunner on the long-running CBS crime drama CSI and Almost Human, among other series. As a writer and producer, Shankar has contributed with works for Farscape, CSI: Crime Scene Investigation, Night Visions, The Outer Limits, The Chronicle, Star Trek: Deep Space Nine, seaQuest 2032, Grimm, Star Trek: Voyager, and Star Trek: The Next Generation.

== Education ==
Naren received his B.S., M.S. and Ph.D. degrees in applied physics and electrical engineering from Cornell University. After graduating, he joined the team behind Star Trek: The Next Generation. As a producer, Shankar has worked with UC: Undercover and Farscape. He also contributed to Doom.

== Career ==
=== Star Trek ===
Naren joined the writing staff of Star Trek: The Next Generation as an intern during the latter half of the fourth season. He then wrote several episodes for The Next Generation and for Star Trek: Deep Space Nine, as well as one first-season episode for Star Trek: Voyager, and worked as science consultant during that show's sixth season and as story editor during the seventh season. Shankar also contributed to the video games Star Trek: The Next Generation – A Final Unity and Star Trek Generations.

=== Success ===
After his time with the Star Trek franchise, Shankar became an associate producer on SeaQuest 2032 during its final season (1995-1996) and wrote two episodes for the series. He then became a writer and executive story consultant for The Outer Limits (1997-1999), working with Harlan Ellison, among others, sharing with him a 2000 Writers Guild of Canada Award for the episode “The Human Operators,” based on a story by Ellison and A. E. van Vogt.

After stints as a writer and executive producer of the Sci-Fi Channel's Farscape (2000-2001) and NBC's short-lived UC: Undercover (2001-2002), Shankar became a consulting producer and head writer on the hit CBS series CSI: Crime Scene Investigation (2002-2010). Shankar then joined the production team of the fantasy television series Grimm as writer and executive producer (2011-2012). He was one of the writers of the Two and a Half Men-episode "Fish in a Drawer" in 2008.

In 2013, Shankar was named co-executive producer and showrunner for the futuristic television series Almost Human alongside creator J. H. Wyman, before leaving the series. The show was produced by J. J. Abrams and starred Karl Urban, but was canceled after one season.

In 2014 he became executive producer and showrunner for The Expanse, an American space opera / mystery science fiction drama television series that premiered on Syfy channel in the United States in December 2015 and was later picked up by Amazon Prime Video, running through January 2022. He also wrote twelve of the series' 62 episodes. The Expanse was widely praised for its scientific realism and technical accuracy, with Shankar being credited for effectively applying his knowledge of physics and engineering.

Shankar is also serving in the same role for For All Mankind, an American TV series based on the premise that the Space Race didn't end with the conquest of the Moon because the Soviets arrived there first.

In November 2024, it was announced that new sci-fi-focused multi-platform media company Expanding Universe, which Shankar co-founded with Breck Eisner, Daniel Abraham and Ty Franck, has a major development deal with Amazon MGM Studios, their first project being a television adaptation — The Captive's War series, with Shankar serving as executive producer, writer and showrunner.

== Awards and nominations ==
He has earned a number of award nominations for his work, including two, 2003 and 2004 Emmy Award for CSI, a 2005 PGA Award and a 2006 Writers Guild of America Award nominations, shared with his fellow producers. He served as executive producer on CSI until 2010, and continues to write for the series, including the Trek-spoofing episode "A Space Oddity" featuring Liz Vassey, Wallace Langham, Kate Vernon, and Ronald D. Moore. Shankar also made his directing debut with the tenth-season episode "Working Stiffs" (2009) for which he also wrote the story. This episode features Trek alumni Wallace Langham, Liz Vassey, Tracy Middendorf, and Tom Virtue.
