= Mike & Molly season 4 =

Mike & Molly
- Season 4
- DVD cover
- Starring: Billy Gardell; Melissa McCarthy; Reno Wilson; Katy Mixon; Nyambi Nyambi; Rondi Reed; Louis Mustillo; David Anthony Higgins; Swoosie Kurtz
- No. of episodes: 22

Release
- Original network: CBS
- Original release: November 4, 2013 – May 19, 2014

Season chronology
- ← Previous; Season 3 Next → Season 5

The fourth season of the television comedy series Mike & Molly began airing November 4, 2013, on CBS in the United States. The season is produced by Chuck Lorre Productions and Warner Bros. Television, with series new show-runner Al Higgins who replaced Mark Roberts serving as executive producer along with Chuck Lorre. On March 27, 2013, CBS announced that Mike & Molly would return for a fourth season of 22 episodes to air mid-season. On October 9, 2013, it was announced that the fourth season would premiere on November 4, 2013, replacing cancelled comedy We Are Men.

The series focuses on the title characters Mike Biggs (Billy Gardell) and Molly Flynn (Melissa McCarthy), a couple who meet at an Overeaters Anonymous meeting in Chicago, Illinois. After Molly, a primary-school teacher (changing career to author this season), invites police officer Mike to give a talk to her class, they begin dating. As of the end of season 2, the two are married. Mike and Molly live in the home of Molly's mother Joyce (Swoosie Kurtz) and sister Victoria (Katy Mixon). Joyce is in an on-off relationship with widower Vince Moranto (Louis Mustillo), who is often seen at the house. Mike is regularly kept company by his best friend and partner in the police force, Carl McMillan (Reno Wilson). Other prominent characters in the series include Mike's mother Peggy (Rondi Reed), cafe worker Samuel (Nyambi Nyambi), and Mike and Molly's friend and co-Overeaters Anonymous member Harry (David Anthony Higgins).

In promos leading up the fourth-season premiere, CBS billed the series as The New Mike & Molly. Though the cast and setting remains essentially the same, the "new" refers to a reboot of the series from the previous season: Molly has quit her teaching job, and is now pursuing a career as a writer. However, the season did retcon the pregnancy announcement from the third-season finale - though the scene was removed from the US broadcast of the finale - to allow Melissa McCarthy to perform physical comedy throughout the season.

== Cast ==
=== Main ===
- Billy Gardell as Mike Biggs (22 episodes)
- Melissa McCarthy as Molly Flynn (22 episodes)
- Reno Wilson as Carl McMillan (22 episodes)
- Katy Mixon as Victoria Flynn (22 episodes)
- Nyambi Nyambi as Samuel (21 episodes)
- Rondi Reed as Peggy Biggs (10 episodes)
- Louis Mustillo as Vince Moranto (19 episodes)
- David Anthony Higgins as Harry (4 episodes)
- Swoosie Kurtz as Joyce Flynn (22 episodes)

=== Special guest stars ===
- Susan Sarandon as J.C. Small
- Kathy Bates as Kay McKinnon

=== Recurring and guest appearances ===
- Cleo King as Rosetta McMillan 'Nana'
- Brian Baumgartner as James Wisney
- Diane Delano as Isabelle
- Christopher Aguilar as Lousette
- Christian Clemenson as Mr. O'Donnell
- Mo Gaffney as Helen
- Brendan Patrick Connor as George
- John Michael Higgins as Dr. Gayle Rosen
- Gary Anthony Williams as Emcee
- Mather Zickel as James
- Casey Washington as Officer Ramirez
- Steve Bannos as Petros

== Episodes ==
No. overall	No. in season	Title	Directed by	Written by	Original release date	Prod. code	U.S. viewers (millions)
71	1	"Molly Unleashed"	Phill Lewis	Story by : Chuck Lorre & Al Higgins; Teleplay by : Julie Bean & Mark Gross & Carla Filisha	November 4, 2013	2J6851	9.22
When Molly finds herself at a crossroads between her career and her dreams, she makes a huge decision to leave her teaching job. While getting drunk with Joyce and Victoria, she reveals that she always wanted to sing in musicals, but it becomes clear that will not work out.
72	2	"The First and Last Ride-Along"	Phill Lewis	Story by : Chuck Lorre & Al Higgins; Teleplay by : Bill Daly & Julie Bean & Mark Gross	November 11, 2013	2J6852	8.65
Molly decides writing a crime novel will be her new career, so she goes on a ride-along with Mike and Carl to research a book she wants to pen.
73	3	"Sex and Death"	Phill Lewis	Story by : Chuck Lorre & Al Higgins; Teleplay by : Brian Keith Etheridge & Bill Daly & Julie Bean	November 18, 2013	2J6853	8.08
Molly has a "mind-blowing" experience when she goes to Victoria's workplace, a funeral home, to research her novel. Meanwhile, Mike sneaks a peek at Molly's writing while she's out, and is caught by Joyce and Vince. Soon, all three are reading the steamy passages on Molly's computer.
74	4	"Careful What You Dig For"	Phill Lewis	Story by : Chuck Lorre & Al Higgins; Teleplay by : Mark Gross & Carla Filisha & Brian Keith Etheridge	November 25, 2013	2J6855	8.48
Molly meets her literary idol, J.C. Small (Susan Sarandon), a cynic who advises her to write about things in her life that she wouldn't want people to know. Meanwhile, Mike invites his mother to dinner for Thanksgiving in an effort to cheer her up.
75	5	"Poker in the Front, Looker in the Back"	Phill Lewis	Story by : Chuck Lorre & Al Higgins; Teleplay by : Carla Filisha & Brian Keith Etheridge & Bill Daly	December 2, 2013	2J6854	8.71
Molly believes her suspicious next-door neighbour, Mr. O'Donnell (Christian Clemenson), is up to no good and recruits Joyce to help her spy on him. Meanwhile, the guys get together for a poker game and end up sharing their dreams and aspirations.
76	6	"Shoeless Molly Flynn"	Phill Lewis	Story by : Chuck Lorre & Al Higgins; Teleplay by : Crystal Jenkins & Aaron Vaccaro & Marla DuMont	December 9, 2013	2J6856	7.78
Molly needs to adjust her spending habits if she wants to maintain harmony in her marriage. But she can't resist buying a pair of shoes on credit and it leads to a fight with Mike, making her decide to look for a job.
77	7	"They Shoot Asses, Don't They?"	Phill Lewis	Story by : Chuck Lorre & Al Higgins; Teleplay by : Julie Bean & Mark Gross & Carla Filisha	December 16, 2013	2J6857	8.88
Mike decides he needs to live every day like it's his last after being shot while thwarting a robbery. As a result, he tells Carl it's time for him to quit the police force.
78	8	"What Molly Hath Wrought"	Stephen Prime	Story by : Chuck Lorre & Al Higgins; Teleplay by : Brian Keith Etheridge & Bill Daly & Julie Bean	January 13, 2014	2J6859	9.84
Frustrated with the progress and content of her novel, Molly decides to take a break from writing and accepts a job as a forklift driver at Vince's warehouse, with mixed results.
79	9	"Mike & Molly's Excellent Adventure"	Phill Lewis	Story by : Chuck Lorre & Al Higgins; Teleplay by : Bill Daly & Julie Bean & Mark Gross	January 20, 2014	2J6858	8.92
Molly is determined to get Mike out of his routine and tells him to embrace doing anything they want in life.
80	10	"Weekend at Peggy's"	Phill Lewis	Story by : Chuck Lorre & Al Higgins; Teleplay by : Carla Filisha & Brian Keith Etheridge & Bill Daly	January 27, 2014	2J6860	10.76
Following a dramatic argument with Joyce over money, Mike and Molly move into Mike's childhood room at Peggy's.
81	11	"Dips & Salsa"	Phill Lewis	Story by : Chuck Lorre & Al Higgins; Teleplay by : Mark Gross & Carla Filisha & Brian Keith Etheridge	February 3, 2014	2J6861	10.27
Molly wants to get Mike out of the house and suggests a salsa dance class. When Mike isn't thrilled with the activity, he asks Carl to replace him as Molly's dance partner, but gets jealous when he realizes they're having way too much fun.
82	12	"Mind Over Molly"	Phill Lewis	Story by : Chuck Lorre & Al Higgins; Teleplay by : Crystal Jenkins & Aaron Vaccaro & Marla DuMont	February 24, 2014	2J6862	8.16
Molly grudgingly goes to a therapist, Dr. Gayle Rosen (John Michael Higgins), at Mike's urging. After walking out on a session, she returns and finds that her erratic behaviour is the result of finally having stability in her life (provided by Mike), which had been missing since her father died. Note: For this episode, Melissa McCarthy was nominated for the 2014 Primetime Emmy Award for Outstanding Lead Actress in a Comedy Series.
83	13	"Open Mike Night"	Phill Lewis	Story by : Al Higgins; Teleplay by : Julie Bean & Mark Gross & Carla Filisha	March 3, 2014	2J6863	8.91
A confident Molly offers her wisdom to Samuel, who now wants to be a stand-up comic. Meanwhile, Molly's advice to Harry causes him to challenge his protective mother.
84	14	"Rich Man, Poor Girl"	David Trainer	Story by : Chuck Lorre & Al Higgins; Teleplay by : Bill Daly & Julie Bean & Mark Gross	March 10, 2014	2J6864	7.67
Victoria brings home a new boyfriend, James (Mather Zickel), and the entire family wonders if he's finally "the one".
85	15	"Three Girls and an Urn"	David Trainer	Story by : Al Higgins; Teleplay by : Brian Keith Etheridge & Bill Daly & Julie Bean	March 17, 2014	2J6865	7.70
Molly meets the best buddy of her dreams when Peggy's childhood friend, Kay McKinnon (Kathy Bates), comes to town, but Peggy is not keen on sharing.
86	16	"The Dice Lady Cometh"	Victor Gonzalez	Story by : Al Higgins & Crystal Jenkins; Teleplay by : Carla Filisha & Brian Keith Etheridge & Bill Daly	March 24, 2014	2J6866	7.83
Molly looks to win some extra cash when she and the girls head to a riverboat casino for the weekend. Meanwhile, Mike and Vince try to enjoy some college basketball when the guys come over to watch TV.
87	17	"McMillan and Mom"	Michael McDonald	Story by : Chuck Lorre & Al Higgins; Teleplay by : Mark Gross & Carla Filisha & Brian Keith Etheridge	April 14, 2014	2J6867	7.49
Carl, Mike and Samuel take a road trip to Memphis to meet Carl's mother for the first time after Carl finds out she is alive, but ill. Meanwhile, Molly, Victoria and Joyce bond with Carl's Grandma, as she tries to explain why she lied to Carl all these years.
88	18	"Mike's Manifold Destiny"	Steve Prime	Story by : Chuck Lorre & Kevin Lappin & Connor Kilpatrick; Teleplay by : Al Higgins & Julie Bean & Mark Gross	April 21, 2014	2J6872	7.33
Mike learns a lesson after his car breaks down and he's forced to decide whether or not to accept a loan from Carl to fix it.
89	19	"Who's Afraid of J.C. Small?"	Melissa McCarthy	Story by : Chuck Lorre & Al Higgins; Teleplay by : Crystal Jenkins & Aaron Vaccaro & Marla DuMont	April 28, 2014	2J6869	7.60
Mike and Carl arrest Molly's literary hero, J.C. Small (Susan Sarandon) for a DUI. After Molly repeatedly prevents J.C.'s self-destruction, the writer offers to pay Molly to be her assistant and help her complete her latest novel.
90	20	"Sex, Lies and Helicopters"	Victor Gonzalez	Story by : Chuck Lorre & Aaron Vaccaro & Marla DuMont; Teleplay by : Al Higgins & Julie Bean & Mark Gross	May 5, 2014	2J6868	6.54
Molly catches Carl coming out of Victoria's room late at night, with all three parties agreeing that they cannot tell Mike. Things get more complicated when Carl sends Victoria a large stuffed bear that plays The Partridge Family song, "I Think I Love You".
91	21	"This Old Peggy"	David Trainer	Story by : Chuck Lorre & Al Higgins; Teleplay by : Bill Daly & Carla Filisha & Brian Keith Etheridge	May 12, 2014	2J6870	6.95
Peggy's bathtub falls through the ceiling, and she admits she might have forgotten to turn the water off. After another shocking incident of forgetfulness in front of Mike, Carl and Samuel, Mike suggests Peggy see a doctor to get her condition diagnosed.
92	22	"Eight Is Enough"	David Trainer	Story by : Chuck Lorre & Al Higgins; Teleplay by : Bill Daly & Carla Filisha & Brian Keith Etheridge	May 19, 2014	2J6871	7.05
Molly is accepted into a prestigious writer's workshop at the University of Iowa in Iowa, which would have her living out of town for eight weeks. As the household now includes Peggy and the frequently sleeping-over Carl, Molly tries to find a way to break the news to Mike. Mike explodes when he finds out, but later confides in Carl that he is really worried Molly could become a famous writer and leave him.

== Ratings ==
=== Live and DVR ratings ===
No.	Title	Air Date	Rating/Share (18–49)	Viewers (millions)	DVR 18-49	DVR Viewers (millions)	Total 18-49	Total viewers (millions)
1	Molly Unleashed	November 4, 2013	2.6/6	9.22		2.64		11.86
2	The First and Last Ride-Along	November 11, 2013	2.3/6	8.65				
3	Sex and Death	November 18, 2013	2.3/6	8.08				
4	Careful What You Dig For	November 25, 2013	2.5/6	8.48	0.8	2.17	3.3	10.65
5	Poker in the Front, Looker in the Back	December 2, 2013	2.4/6	8.71	0.8	2.02	3.2	10.73
6	Shoeless Molly Flynn	December 9, 2013	2.0/5	7.78				
7	They Shoot Asses, Don't They?	December 16, 2013	2.2/6	8.88	0.8	1.92	3.0	10.80
8	What Molly Hath Wrought	January 13, 2014	2.4/6	9.84	0.9		3.3	
9	Mike & Molly's Excellent Adventure	January 20, 2014	2.1/5	8.92		2.00		10.92
10	Weekend at Peggy's	January 27, 2014	2.6/7	10.76	0.7	2.12	3.3	12.88
11	Dips & Salsa	February 3, 2014	2.7/7	10.27	0.8	2.06	3.5	12.33
12	Mind Over Molly	February 24, 2014	2.1/5	8.16				
13	Open Mike Night	March 3, 2014	2.2/6	8.91				
14	Rich Man, Poor Girl	March 10, 2014	1.8/5	7.67				
15	Three Girls and an Urn	March 17, 2014	1.8/5	7.70				
16	The Dice Lady Cometh	March 24, 2014	2.0/6	7.83	0.7	1.88	2.7	9.71
17	McMillan and Mom	April 14, 2014	2.1/6	7.49	0.7	1.88	2.8	9.37
18	Mike's Manifold Destiny	April 21, 2014	1.9/5	7.33	0.7	1.87	2.6	9.20
19	Who's Afraid of J.C. Small?	April 28, 2014	2.2/6	7.60				
20	Sex, Lies and Helicopters	May 5, 2014	1.7/5	6.54				
21	This Old Peggy	May 12, 2014	2.0/5	6.95		1.68		8.63
22	Eight Is Enough	May 19, 2014	1.9/6	7.05	0.7	1.85	2.6	8.90
