= Mike & Molly season 1 =

Mike & Molly
- Season 1
- Blu-Ray cover
- Starring: Billy Gardell; Melissa McCarthy; Reno Wilson; Katy Mixon; Nyambi Nyambi; Rondi Reed; Cleo King; Louis Mustillo; Swoosie Kurtz
- No. of episodes: 24

Release
- Original network: CBS
- Original release: September 20, 2010 – May 16, 2011

Season chronology
- Next → Season 2

The first season of the television comedy series Mike & Molly aired on CBS from September 20, 2010, to May 16, 2011. The season was produced by Chuck Lorre Productions and Warner Bros. Television, with series creator Mark Roberts serving as executive producer along with Chuck Lorre, James Burrows and Don Foster.

The series focuses on the title characters Mike Biggs (Billy Gardell) and Molly Flynn (Melissa McCarthy), a couple who meet at an Overeaters Anonymous meeting in Chicago, Illinois. After Molly, a primary-school teacher, invites police officer Mike to give a talk to her class, they begin dating. Molly lives at home with her mother Joyce (Swoosie Kurtz), and sister Victoria (Katy Mixon). Joyce is in an on-off relationship with widower Vince Moranto (Louis Mustillo), who is often seen at the house. Mike lives alone in an apartment but is regularly kept company by his best friend and partner in the police force Carl McMillan (Reno Wilson). Other prominent characters in the series include Carl's grandmother Rosetta (Cleo King); Mike's mother Peggy (Rondi Reed) and cafe worker Samuel (Nyambi Nyambi). Season one of Mike & Molly consisted of 24 episodes and aired Mondays in the United States at 9.30 p.m. until April 11, 2011, with the final three episodes airing at 9.00 p.m.

The season received mixed reviews from critics, some of whom believed the show was clichéd and re-trod the path of old sitcoms. Some critics questioned the subject matter, with one particularly controversial article from Marie Claire commenting on the idea of two overweight actors playing starring roles. Nevertheless, the series received average ratings of 11.14 million viewers, placing it as the number 35 most watched show of the television season. Melissa McCarthy won the Primetime Emmy Award for Outstanding Lead Actress in a Comedy Series at the 63rd Primetime Emmy Awards for her performance as Molly, and the series was also nominated for a People's Choice Award for Best New Comedy. Mike and Molly was renewed for a second season to premiere in the 2011–12 television season.

== Cast ==
=== Main ===
- Billy Gardell as Mike Biggs (24 episodes)
- Melissa McCarthy as Molly Flynn (24 episodes)
- Reno Wilson as Carl McMillan (24 episodes)
- Katy Mixon as Victoria Flynn (24 episodes)
- Nyambi Nyambi as Samuel (24 episodes)
- Rondi Reed as Peggy Biggs (9 episodes)
- Cleo King as Rosetta McMillan 'Nana' (12 episodes)
- Louis Mustillo as Vince Moranto (12 episodes)
- Swoosie Kurtz as Joyce Flynn (24 episodes)

=== Recurring and guest appearances ===
- David Anthony Higgins as Harry
- Reginald VelJohnson as Brother Heywood
- Brendan Patrick Connor as George
- Lamont Thompson as Andre
- David Mazouz as Randy
- Rebecca Field as Jill
- Robert Gant as Kyle
- Keone Young as Abe
- William Sanderson as Dennis

== Episodes ==
No. overall	No. in season	Title	Directed by	Written by	Original release date	Prod. code	U.S. viewers (millions)
1	1	"Pilot"	James Burrows	Mark Roberts	September 20, 2010	296772	12.23
Mike struggles with his new diet. At an Over-Eaters Anonymous meeting, Molly sympathizes with Mike and invites him to come speak to her fourth grade class. Later, he appears at her home after a robbery and asks her out on a date. She says yes.
2	2	"First Date"	James Burrows	Mark Roberts & Chuck Lorre	September 27, 2010	2J5852	11.12
Molly gets a head cold before her first date with Mike. Her mother and sister accidentally both give her medicine and Molly adds wine at dinner. The night ends up being a disaster. Meanwhile, Mike gets fashion advice from Carl and his cousin, Andre (Lamont Thompson), who own a "Big & Tall" store. Note: For this episode, Melissa McCarthy won the 2011 Primetime Emmy Award for Outstanding Lead Actress in a Comedy Series.
3	3	"First Kiss"	James Burrows	Mark Roberts & Al Higgins	October 4, 2010	2J5853	12.21
Mike gets beat at bowling by Molly, who turns out to be a better bowler and an ungracious winner. He later gets some advice from Carl's grandmother (Cleo King), who tells him that there's nothing sexier in a man than him being honest. Mike then takes Molly again to bowling, and when she strikes again, he kisses her for the first time.
4	4	"Mike's Not Ready"	James Burrows	Mark Roberts & Chuck Lorre	October 11, 2010	2J5854	10.72
Molly misunderstands Mike's reasoning for not wanting to come inside her house after a date and breaks-up with him. After getting drunk in a bar, Mike reveals that he's ashamed of his own body, and that's the reason why he had been taking things too slow with Molly. After leaving the bar, Mike, Carl, Samuel and the taxi driver, Undugu, go to Molly's house where Mike decides to serenade Molly. When he reaches her window, he tells her why he wasn't ready to take the next step, and that he wants the first time to be very special. However, he passes out while on the ladder and the gang is forced to spend the night at Molly's house.
5	5	"Carl Is Jealous"	James Burrows	Mark Roberts & Don Foster	October 18, 2010	2J5855	10.90
Mike and Molly take her sister Victoria on a double date with Carl. After a nice dinner, Victoria leaves with Michael Jordan and Molly tells Mike that he is going to get lucky, but a small accident prevents it.
6	6	"Mike's Apartment"	James Burrows	Mark Roberts & Julie Bean	October 25, 2010	2J5856	10.81
Mike's plans for a romantic night with Molly are interrupted by a call from his mother, Peggy (Rondi Reed) who fakes having chest pains. Peggy is hostile towards Molly because she feels that she will get replaced. Molly explains this to Mike and they sleep together after Mike finds a way to ignore the calls from his mom.
7	7	"After the Lovin'"	James Burrows	Mark Roberts & Don Foster & Mark Gross	November 1, 2010	2J5857	10.75
After spending the weekend together, Mike and Molly are ecstatic. To avoid getting too clingy, Molly tries to slow down, but it doesn't help when Mike visits her in the school with a Teddy Bear.
8	8	"Mike Snores"	James Burrows	Mark Roberts & Don Foster & Carla Filisha	November 8, 2010	2J5858	10.80
Mike spends the night at Molly's house. To help his snoring, Mike starts using a machine, but that doesn't help much.
9	9	"Mike's New Boots"	James Burrows	Mark Roberts & Don Foster & Al Higgins	November 15, 2010	2J5859	12.15
Molly gets mad when a blonde woman named Jill (Rebecca Field), flirts with Mike at their Over-Eaters Anonymous meeting, and Mike introduces Molly to her as his "friend". After a long talk with Carl's grandma, Mike realizes that he is in love with Molly. On the other hand, Molly gets drunk with Victoria and realizes that she is in love with Mike. Joyce starts dating Vince (Louis Mustillo).
10	10	"Molly Gets a Hat"	James Burrows	Mark Roberts & Don Foster & Mark Gross	November 22, 2010	2J5860	12.93
Molly feels obliged to invite Mike's mother, Peggy, to spend Thanksgiving in her house after Peggy gives her a hat as a present of goodwill. Mike invites Carl and his grandma and Carl invites Samuel & his 5 roommates. Molly tries to prepare a meal for all the guests, but the turkey is a disaster.
11	11	"Carl Gets a Girl"	James Burrows	Mark Roberts & Chuck Lorre & Don Foster	December 6, 2010	2J5861	11.04
After Carl borrows Mike's apartment for a date night, Mike spends the night with Molly's family, where he bonds with her mother and sister and gets in touch with his feminine side. Joyce & Vince break up, and Mike helps Vince patch things up.
12	12	"First Christmas"	James Burrows	Mark Roberts & Don Foster	December 13, 2010	2J5862	11.96
Mike has no idea what to get Molly for their first Christmas as a couple. He runs a lot of ideas through Joyce & Carl, but they reject it all. He is also unable to take the hints Molly gives him. Finally, he ends up buying her expensive jewelry. Molly gets Mike a leather jacket, but has to exchange it for a video game when Mike ends up buying a jacket himself.
13	13	"Mike Goes to the Opera"	James Burrows	Story by : Mark Roberts & Chuck Lorre; Teleplay by : Don Foster & Al Higgins	January 3, 2011	2J5863	12.39
Molly and Peggy fight over who can take better care of Mike when he gets sick on a trip to the opera. They keep driving him back and forth between their houses, without any consideration for Mike's health.
14	14	"Molly Makes Soup"	James Burrows	Mark Roberts & Don Foster & Mark Gross	January 17, 2011	2J5864	12.80
Molly doesn't like that her mother's new boyfriend, Vince, is trying to befriend Mike. When Mike decides to go to a basketball game with Vince & Carl, instead to taking Molly out, she gets mad and tries her best to stop him by being very passive-aggressive. He ends up going anyway and Molly ends up spending time with her sister & mother, who are both high. In the end, Vince proposes to Joyce and she says, yes.
15	15	"Jim Won't Eat"	James Burrows	Story by : Mark Roberts & Don Foster; Teleplay by : Al Higgins & Julie Bean	February 7, 2011	2J5865	12.55
During a dinner at Peggy's place, she informs them that she is having a gallbladder surgery. She asks Mike to drive her to the hospital, where she believes she would die. Peggy offers Mike the grave next to her, but he tells Molly that he wants to be buried next to her, which shocks her and they have a huge fight. Peggy leaves Jim with Molly and she takes him home. When Jim refuses to eat, Victoria takes Jim out for a walk, which changes him completely. Peggy pulls through and Mike & Molly make-up.
16	16	"First Valentine's Day"	James Burrows	Mark Roberts & Chuck Lorre & Don Foster	February 14, 2011	2J5866	12.92
Mike orders a special cake for Valentine's day and ends up meeting the baker, who turns out to be Molly's ex-fiancé, Kyle (Robert Gant). He gets very upset because Molly never mentioned being engaged, but later discovers that Kyle is gay. Vince & Joyce go to an adult motel for their first Valentine's Day.
17	17	"Joyce & Vince and Peaches & Herb"	James Burrows	Story by : Mark Roberts & Don Foster; Teleplay by : Mark Gross & Al Higgins	February 21, 2011	2J5867	11.20
Molly wants Mike to take her out more often, while Mike decides the couch is his best friend. On Carl's suggestion, Mike decides to make Molly dinner and just stay home, but Molly is bored and decides to hit the town with her sister, Victoria. Mike visits his mom who tells him about her relationship with his dad, which was boring. Mike finally tracks down Molly & goes to the club. Vince takes Joyce out to see Peaches & Herb and has sex with her on the stairs.
18	18	"Mike's Feet"	James Burrows	Story by : Mark Roberts & Don Foster; Teleplay by : Mark Gross & Al Higgins	February 28, 2011	2J5868	11.35
Mike and Carl get on each other's nerves after working too many double shifts together and start bickering continuously. He rambles on and on about Carl while eating with Molly and ruins the dinner. Mike & Carl bicker while Mike is driving & they end up in an accident and later ends up ruining his & Molly's weekend getaway. Molly then helps Carl & Mike mend their fight.
19	19	"Peggy Shaves Her Legs"	James Burrows	Story by : Mark Roberts & Don Foster; Teleplay by : Julie Bean & Carla Filisha	March 21, 2011	2J5869	9.70
Peggy is unusually nice to Molly and decides to have lunch with her. Mike worries that his mom may tell stories that embarrass him. During lunch Peggy tells Molly that she has been asked out on a date and asks her to keep it from Mike, but Molly tells Mike anyway. Molly, Joyce & Victoria helps Peggy get ready, and Mike follows her to keep a check on her.
20	20	"Opening Day"	James Burrows	Story by : Mark Roberts & Jim Patterson; Teleplay by : Don Foster & Al Higgins	April 11, 2011	2J5870	7.91
When Molly mentions going to Chicago Cubs games with her dad, Mike breaks tradition and invites Molly to join Carl and him to the opening day game. As only two seats are in the front, they use round robin and keep changing their seats. During the game, Molly gets very emotional, Mike is trying his best to keep his diet and Carl is unhappy that he did not have a good relationship with his father.
21	21	"Samuel Gets Fired"	James Burrows	Story by : Mark Roberts & Don Foster; Teleplay by : Al Higgins & Julie Bean	April 18, 2011	2J5871	9.98
Thanks to Carl's interference, Samuel is fired from his job at the restaurant and Mike & Carl are asked to start paying for their meals. Samuel moves in with Mike, as he has no money to pay rent and Mike moves in with Molly. Samuel accompanies Mike to Molly's house for dinner. Samuel's boss hires his own wife to replace Samuel. Samuel starts re-decorating and using Mike's house for entertaining women. Finally, Mike pays Samuel's raise, Abe (Keone Young), and gets him the job back.
22	22	"Cigar Talk"	James Burrows	Story by : Mark Roberts & Don Foster & Chuck Lorre; Teleplay by : Al Higgins & Mark Gross	May 2, 2011	2J5872	8.19
Joyce wants to take Vince along as her date to her high school reunion, prompting Vince to reveal he never finished high school to Mike, over a cigar. Mike tells Molly that Vince has a secret and she assumes that Vince is cheating and tells Joyce. Meanwhile, Mike helps Vince to study for a GED test. The girls are upset with Vince until he tells them the truth, and Molly helps him study.
23	23	"Victoria's Birthday"	James Burrows	Story by : Mark Roberts & Don Foster & Chuck Lorre; Teleplay by : Julie Bean & Carla Filisha & Jim Patterson	May 9, 2011	2J5873	7.63
Victoria turns 30 and is not happy about it. Molly tries to help her and ends up convincing Victoria to have a baby. Mike then tries to talk to her and she ends up deciding to join the army. Finally, Carl asks her to join his church. In the subplots, Vince & Mike want to watch Godfather, but Molly keeps interrupting. Mike & Molly struggle with their new diet.
24	24	"Peggy's New Beau"	James Burrows	Story by : Mark Roberts & Don Foster & Chuck Lorre; Teleplay by : Al Higgins & Mark Gross	May 16, 2011	2J5874	8.64
Mike & Molly meet Peggy's new "friend from church", Dennis (William Sanderson). They instantly like him, but when he brings up wedding bells, they feel a bit pressured. After a talk with Carl's grandma, Mike decides to propose to Molly. She says yes.

== Ratings ==
Episode #	Title	Air Date	18-49	Viewers (millions)
1	Pilot	September 20, 2010	3.9/10	12.23
2	First Date	September 27, 2010	3.7/9	11.12
3	First Kiss	October 4, 2010	3.9/9	12.21
4	Mike's Not Ready	October 11, 2010	3.5/9	10.72
5	Carl Is Jealous	October 18, 2010	3.5/9	10.90
6	Mike's Apartment	October 25, 2010	3.7/9	10.81
7	After the Lovin'	November 1, 2010	3.6/9	10.75
8	Mike Snores	November 8, 2010	3.5/9	10.80
9	Mike's New Boots	November 15, 2010	3.7/9	12.15
10	Molly Gets a Hat	November 22, 2010	4.0/10	12.93
11	Carl Gets a Girl	December 6, 2010	3.4/8	11.04
12	First Christmas	December 13, 2010	3.6/9	11.96
13	Mike Goes to the Opera	January 3, 2011	3.7/9	12.39
14	Molly Makes Soup	January 17, 2011	3.7/9	12.80
15	Jim Won't Eat	February 7, 2011	3.5/9	12.55
16	First Valentine's Day	February 14, 2011	3.8/10	12.92
17	Joyce & Vince and Peaches & Herb	February 21, 2011	3.2/8	11.20
18	Mike's Feet	February 28, 2011	3.4/9	11.35
19	Peggy Shaves Her Legs	March 21, 2011	3.0/8	9.70
20	Opening Day	April 11, 2011	2.5/6	7.91
21	Samuel Gets Fired	April 18, 2011	2.6/6	9.98
22	Cigar Talk	May 2, 2011	2.4/6	8.19
23	Victoria's Birthday	May 9, 2011	2.3/6	7.63
24	Peggy's New Beau	May 16, 2011	2.6/6	8.64
