= Mike & Molly season 2 =

Mike & Molly
- Season 2
- DVD cover
- Starring: Billy Gardell; Melissa McCarthy; Reno Wilson; Katy Mixon; Nyambi Nyambi; Rondi Reed; Cleo King; Louis Mustillo; Swoosie Kurtz
- No. of episodes: 23

Release
- Original network: CBS
- Original release: September 26, 2011 – May 14, 2012

Season chronology
- ← Previous; Season 1 Next → Season 3

The second season of the television comedy series Mike & Molly began airing on September 26, 2011, on CBS in the United States. The season was produced by Chuck Lorre Productions and Warner Bros. Television, with series creator Mark Roberts serving as executive producer along with Chuck Lorre, James Burrows and Don Foster.

The series focuses on the title characters Mike Biggs (Billy Gardell) and Molly Flynn (Melissa McCarthy), a couple who meet at an Overeaters Anonymous meeting in Chicago, Illinois. After Molly, a primary-school teacher, invites police officer Mike to give a talk to her class, they begin dating. Molly lives at home with her mother Joyce (Swoosie Kurtz), and sister Victoria (Katy Mixon). Joyce is in an on-off relationship with widower Vince Moranto (Louis Mustillo), who is often seen at the house. Mike lives alone in an apartment but is regularly kept company by his best friend and partner in the police force Carl McMillan (Reno Wilson). Other prominent characters in the series include Carl's grandmother Rosetta (Cleo King), Mike's mother Peggy (Rondi Reed) and cafe worker Samuel (Nyambi Nyambi). Holly Robinson Peete has a recurring guest role in Season 2 as Carl's love interest. Season two of Mike & Molly was broadcast in the United States on Mondays at 9:30 pm.

On August 21, 2012 Warner Home Video released a three-disc set of the second season on DVD, which included every episode, a featurette, bloopers, and interviews with the cast.

== Cast ==
=== Main ===
- Billy Gardell as Mike Biggs (23 episodes)
- Melissa McCarthy as Molly Flynn (23 episodes)
- Reno Wilson as Carl McMillan (23 episodes)
- Katy Mixon as Victoria Flynn (23 episodes)
- Nyambi Nyambi as Samuel (23 episodes)
- Rondi Reed as Peggy Biggs (13 episodes)
- Cleo King as Rosetta McMillan, "Nana" (8 episodes)
- Louis Mustillo as Vince Moranto (18 episodes)
- Swoosie Kurtz as Joyce Flynn (23 episodes)

=== Recurring and guest appearances ===
- Holly Robinson Peete as Christina
- David Anthony Higgins as Harry
- Reginald VelJohnson as Brother Heywood
- Francis Guinan as Jack Biggs
- William Sanderson as Dennis
- Steve Hytner as Principal Gilmartin
- Laura Coover as Rebecca
- Cheryl Hawker as Lynette
- Marianne Muellerleile as Connie
- Brendan Patrick Connor as George
- Howard Hesseman as Otis
- Josh Dean as Father Justin
- Lamont Thompson as Andre
- June Squibb as Francine
- Dave "Gruber" Allen as Tom
- Mark Roberts as Homeless Guy

== Episodes ==
No. overall	No. in season	Title	Directed by	Written by	Original release date	Prod. code	U.S. viewers (millions)
25	1	"Goin' Fishin'"	James Burrows	Story by : Chuck Lorre & Mark Roberts; Teleplay by : Julie Bean & Don Foster & Al Higgins	September 26, 2011	2J6501	13.86
After their engagement, trouble arises when Molly wants to start planning their wedding and Mike is not keen on setting a date. Vince offers to walk Molly down the aisle. Mike decides to go fishing with the guys. On the way to the lake, Molly wants Mike to check out a wedding location near the lake and Mike calls it nonsense, which makes Molly mad. The fishing trip is a disaster because the boat sinks. Joyce takes Molly to yoga and sends the pictures of Molly stretching with the handsome instructor to Vince. Mike rushes home with news that he checked the reception hall and promises to help plan the wedding.
26	2	"Dennis's Birthday"	James Burrows	Story by : Chuck Lorre & Mark Roberts; Teleplay by : Don Foster & Mark Gross & Carla Filisha	October 3, 2011	2J6502	13.20
Molly is sick of everything that is wrong with Mike's apartment and asks him to move in with her into her mother's house. Mike talks it over with Carl who isn't too happy with it. Peggy throws a birthday party for Dennis (William Sanderson), her boyfriend, and Molly makes a cake. After the party Peggy decides to give him a "birthday gift" and confides in Molly. Peggy gets a surprise when he drops dead in her bed. She drags him down, dresses him up and puts in front of Molly's cake before calling Mike to help. Mike eventually finds the reason for Dennis' death. Peggy spends the night at Molly's, where she mourns his death. After seeing Dennis' sad apartment, Mike decides to move in with Molly.
27	3	"Mike in the House"	James Burrows	Story by : Chuck Lorre & Mark Roberts; Teleplay by : Don Foster & Al Higgins & Julie Bean	October 10, 2011	2J6503	11.65
Mike moves in with Molly and her family, but Molly has problems adjusting to having Mike's bachelor pad stuff in her house, including his TV. Mike stores some of his things in his mom's garage, and discovers that his mom has sold all his childhood toys. Joyce and Victoria start seeing him as Molly's dad, start dressing him up in his old clothes and start cooking for him. Mike starts to love the food and attention he gets and spends a lot of time "working" on the roof, pretending to help out. Victoria loses her car and Molly drives around to find it. They finally find it in the garage.
28	4	"'57 Chevy Bel Air"	James Burrows	Story by : Chuck Lorre & Mark Roberts; Teleplay by : Don Foster & Mark Gross & Carla Filisha	October 17, 2011	2J6504	11.51
Molly wants to save money for their wedding, but Mike is interested in buying Vince's 1957 Chevy Bel Air. In spite of Molly's objections, Mike buys it for $7800. Carl and Rosetta love the car. To convince Molly, he takes her for a ride, and she starts to like it. Mike finally tells her that he has already bought it. When the car starts to give trouble, Mike demands a refund, but Vince refuses. Joyce interferes and gets them $7250. Molly then reveals her bad financial status to Mike. Molly, Victoria and Joyce discuss wedding location.
29	5	"Victoria Runs Away"	James Burrows	Story by : Chuck Lorre & Mark Roberts; Teleplay by : Don Foster & Al Higgins & Julie Bean	October 24, 2011	2J6505	12.19
Molly has a disagreement with Victoria over her choices in dating. When the guy runs off with some items in the house, Molly is furious. Joyce joins in and the argument becomes bigger. Victoria has a talk with Mike, after which she decides to move out. Mike then gets involved in the girls' fight and some secrets come out. To escape the fighting, Mike runs away. When he returns, all is well.
30	6	"Happy Halloween"	James Burrows	Story by : Chuck Lorre & Mark Roberts; Teleplay by : Don Foster & Al Higgins & Julie Bean	October 31, 2011	2J6507	11.45
Molly is interested in the vice principal position in her school and gets excited when she is invited to a Halloween party at the house of her boss Mr. Gilmartin (Steve Hytner). Mike is uninterested, but they go as Frankenstein and the Bride of Frankenstein. At the party, Molly is upset by the office politics, but Mike encourages her not to leave. Finally, her boss acknowledges that she would make a great vice principal. Vince has trouble with teenagers asking for candy without even dressing up. Carl and Samuel make a plan to get women by dressing up as Zorro and SpongeBob SquarePants.
31	7	"Carl Meets a Lady"	James Burrows	Story by : Chuck Lorre & Mark Roberts; Teleplay by : Don Foster & Mark Gross & Carla Filisha	November 7, 2011	2J6506	11.93
Carl is partying non-stop and Rosetta is worried. She asks Mike to fix him up with a nice girl. At the dinner, Carl and Mike meet Christina (Holly Robinson Peete), who is an optometrist. Carl tries to ask her out and ends up insulting her. He then apologizes and they start going out. Molly is busy with her work and has no time for Mike, who misses her.
32	8	"Peggy Gets a Job"	James Burrows	Story by : Chuck Lorre & Mark Roberts; Teleplay by : Don Foster & Mark Gross & Carla Filisha	November 14, 2011	2J6508	12.18
Mike makes dinner for the girls. Peggy drops by suddenly and guilts Molly, and she ends up inviting her for lunch in her school. Peggy shares her insecurities with Molly. Mike goes to meet his mother. After a heart-to-heart with Mike, she becomes a lunch lady in Molly's school. Though initially upset, Molly starts liking the situation when Peggy becomes source of gossip for her, especially about Rebecca, the other candidate for the vice president's job. Peggy convinces Molly to have a church wedding.
33	9	"Mike Cheats"	James Burrows	Story by : Chuck Lorre & Mark Roberts; Teleplay by : Don Foster & Al Higgins & Julie Bean	November 21, 2011	2J6509	13.05
Harry talks about not having a Thanksgiving plan in his OA meeting and then finds Mike eating candy bars. He volunteers to be Mike's sponsor and gets himself invited to Molly's house for Thanksgiving dinner. Mike tries to diet, so that he can have some stuffing and dessert at Thanksgiving. His current clothes are getting tight, so he gets his bigger clothes from his mom's place, where he ends up eating macaroni and cheese. Molly tries to make a healthy Thanksgiving meal. Harry takes Mike to a gay OA meeting to make sure that Molly does not find about his weight gain, but that does not help. Joyce and Victoria compares Mike's behavior with that of their cat, who used to eat outside and sneak home. Carl, Rosetta and Christina go to Molly's place for Thanksgiving. Mike finally confesses to Molly and they go to a OA meeting.
34	10	"Molly Needs a Number"	James Burrows	Story by : Chuck Lorre & Mark Roberts; Teleplay by : Don Foster & Mark Gross & Carla Filisha	December 5, 2011	2J6510	12.66
Molly is swamped with Christmas preparations and wedding planning and asks Mike for a final guest list, who takes his mom's help. Mike invites Carl and Christina to dinner without consulting Molly. He also forgets to tell Molly about Christina's nut allergy. Joyce and Vince want to have a double wedding. When Molly insists on getting a head count from Mike, he calls her crazy. She gives up and asks him to do all the work. During the dinner party, Mike announces that he wants to elope, to avoid all the planning. Molly gets upset and leaves. Christina has a talk with her, then gets an allergic reaction from the hazelnuts and has to be taken to the emergency room. Mike and Molly finally talk and resolve their issues.
35	11	"Christmas Break"	James Burrows	Story by : Chuck Lorre & Mark Roberts; Teleplay by : Don Foster & Al Higgins & Julie Bean	December 12, 2011	2J6511	12.77
Molly starts planning Christmas. At school, Rebecca finally reveals that she got the vice principal's job, as she is sleeping with the principal. Molly then gets drunk with Peggy and all the lunch ladies. Mike is looking forward to a nice Christmas with Molly's family. He also dresses up as Santa and Carl dresses as an elf for charity, but is doesn't go very well. At home, Molly is depressed and watches TV with Vince, when an old student turns up to thank her for helping him get accepted to art school. She finally comes out of her depression and realizes the true value of her job.
36	12	"Carl Has Issues"	James Burrows	Story by : Mark Roberts & Chuck Lorre; Teleplay by : Don Foster & Mark Gross & Carla Filisha	January 2, 2012	2J6512	11.90
Carl and Christina decide to take their relationship to the next level, by sleeping together. After dinner, they talk and make out. Christina gets a call from her son and he realizes that the relationship is getting very serious. Carl freaks out and leaves. Vince takes Joyce and Victoria on a weekend trip to a casino, which finally leaves Mike and Molly alone in the house. They are interrupted by a drunk Carl. The next day he avoids Christina. She breaks up with him. Rosetta then puts some sense into Carl and he patches things up with Christina.
37	13	"Victoria Can't Drive"	James Burrows	Story by : Mark Roberts & Chuck Lorre; Teleplay by : Don Foster & Al Higgins & Julie Bean	January 16, 2012	2J6513	11.09
Peggy discovers that Mike has invited his dad to the wedding and she gets mad. Mike tries to un-invite his dad, but he also gets mad. To add to his problems, Victoria gets arrested for unpaid parking tickets. He is stuck chauffeuring her around. Victoria convinces Peggy to use the wedding to show Mike's dad what he missed. During the ride with Mike, Peggy calls to say that she is fine with her ex-husband coming to the wedding.
38	14	"Joyce's Choices"	James Burrows	Story by : Mark Roberts & Chuck Lorre; Teleplay by : Don Foster & Mark Gross & Carla Filisha	February 6, 2012	2J6514	10.95
Joyce drives Vince crazy with jealousy when she agrees to have dinner with her ex-boyfriend. Vince then spies on her and it drives Joyce to break up with him. The girls take her out to cheer her up and Joyce confesses that she kissed her ex-boyfriend. At this point she realizes that she loves Vince and eventually asks him to move in with her. Molly and Mike start planning their honeymoon. When Mike starts suggesting places in the US rather than flying to Paris, Molly suspects that he is scared of flying. Finally, he agrees to face his fear and go to Paris.
39	15	"Valentine's Piggyback"	James Burrows	Story by : Mark Roberts & Chuck Lorre; Teleplay by : Don Foster & Al Higgins & Julie Bean	February 13, 2012	2J6515	10.91
Carl has a romantic plan for Valentine's Day with Christina. Molly asks Mike to keep it simple, so he makes no plans. When Carl points out that Molly didn't really meant what she said, he tries to mooch off Carl's plan. On the way to the date, Carl and Mike see a man about to jump, and try to save him. In the process Carl falls and Mike saves him. The girls have a nice Valentine's without the guys and Molly finds out about Mike's piggyback. Molly gets Mike a universal remote and asks Harry to set it up. He starts talking to Victoria and ends up becoming her Valentine.
40	16	"Surprise"	James Burrows	Story by : Mark Roberts & Chuck Lorre; Teleplay by : Don Foster & Mark Gross & Carla Filisha	February 20, 2012	2J6516	11.33
Molly decides to throw Mike a surprise birthday party when she realizes that Peggy has not had a party for Mike since he was 9. Victoria and Joyce act funny when they try to keep the secret from him. Finally, Carl breaks and tells him. Samuel starts dating online and meets a beautiful African girl, Amira (Diarra Kilpatrick). She starts spending all his money and drains him. Samuel borrows Mike's car to impress her and she loses that car. On the night of his birthday, Mike is stuck taking a bus to the party and reaches it two hours late.
41	17	"Mike Likes Lasagna"	James Burrows	Story by : Mark Roberts & Chuck Lorre; Teleplay by : Don Foster & Al Higgins & Julie Bean	February 27, 2012	2J6517	10.12
Molly suggests that she and Mike write their own wedding vows. They both struggle with it, driving everyone around them crazy. Harry loses some weight and asks Victoria to a concert; she says yes. Mike is scared that Harry may get too involved and Victoria is very casual. Molly tells Victoria that it's a date and she cancels. Harry starts overeating and Mike stops him. Harry goes to Molly's to give the tickets to Victoria and they go together as friends. Carl then suggests that Mike think of Molly as the best food he's ever eaten, a lasagne. He manages to write moving vows, and eventually helps Molly also write her vows.
42	18	"Peggy Goes to Branson"	James Burrows	Story by : Mark Roberts; Teleplay by : Don Foster & Al Higgins & Mark Gross	March 19, 2012	2J6518	9.71
Peggy goes to Branson on a church picnic and leaves Jim with Mike and Molly. She tells them that this would be practice for having children. When Mike says, "if they have children," Molly thinks that Mike is not interested in having children and it leads to an argument. Baby talk becomes the hot topic in the house. Jim swallows a tampon and needs surgery. Peggy gives him a guilt trip about it and Molly starts doubting her parenting ability. Mike assures her that they will be fine parents.
43	19	"Molly Can't Lie"	James Burrows	Story by : Mark Roberts & Bill Daly; Teleplay by : Don Foster & Al Higgins & Mark Gross	April 9, 2012	2J6519	9.58
Peggy takes Mike and Molly to her church to meet the priest (Josh Dean). When he brings up the topic of raising their children Catholic, Molly, against Mike's wishes, is truthful and says that she cannot promise that. Due to this, she loses the church and this leads to an argument and a search for a new church to get married in. Mike moves in with his mom, but due to her nagging, he moves in with Carl. Rosetta then suggests her church.
44	20	"The Dress"	James Burrows	Story by : Mark Roberts & Chuck Lorre; Teleplay by : Don Foster & Al Higgins	April 16, 2012	2J6520	9.54
Molly goes for a wedding dress fitting and discovers that she needs to lose six more pounds to fit into her dress. She drives Mike and everyone else crazy when she tries to lose the extra weight. When she meets an old OA friend who is now thin, she runs out of the spin class. She picks a fight in the parking lot and gets arrested. Mike tells her that she is perfect the way she is to calm her down. Note: For this episode, Melissa McCarthy was nominated for the 2012 Primetime Emmy Award for Outstanding Lead Actress in a Comedy Series, but lost to Julia Louis-Dreyfus for Veep.
45	21	"Bachelor/Bachelorette"	James Burrows	Story by : Mark Roberts & Don Foster; Teleplay by : Al Higgins & Julie Bean	April 30, 2012	2J6521	10.16
Mike and Carl start planning the bachelor party and Mike's dad, Jack (Francis Guinan), joins them. He tells them that his marriage is not doing well. He takes his father home. Molly asks him to take his dad to the bachelor party as his mom is coming to her bachelorette party at her place. When Peggy learns that her ex-husband is staying with Mike and Molly, she dresses up and arrives early to meet him, but Mike has already left with him. Peggy gets Molly a stripper, which makes her very uncomfortable. Meanwhile, the guys ride around in a limo and everyone makes a toast. After Vince, Carl and Harry leave, Mike and his dad talk.
46	22	"The Rehearsal"	James Burrows	Story by : Mark Roberts & Don Foster; Teleplay by : Al Higgins & Julie Bean	May 7, 2012	2J6522	10.14
Carl and Christina take Mike and Molly out for a dinner to give them some peaceful time. Mike decides to spend his last night as a bachelor in his mom's house. Carl tells Christina that he loves her after dinner, and her response is just, "That's sweet". This drives Carl crazy and he spoils everyone's mood when the guys go shopping for a tuxedo. Molly's wedding brings up Vince and Joyce's wedding, and during the rehearsal, he tells Molly that he is still married. Mike's dad and mom continuously bicker. Mike and Carl then help Vince get a proper divorce, going to the house of his ex-wife, Francine (June Squibb). Victoria presents Molly with a garter made of their dad's old ties, which is old, borrowed, new and blue. When Mike reaches home, he realizes that his parents are sleeping together.
47	23	"The Wedding"	James Burrows	Story by : Mark Roberts & Don Foster; Teleplay by : Mark Gross & Carla Filisha	May 14, 2012	2J6523	11.79
The wedding day has finally arrived. Mike is still in shock over his parents sleeping together. Carl comes up with a new plan (proposing marriage during the best man's toast) to get Christina to say "I love you" back. The salon messes up Molly's hair and Victoria fixes her up. Molly gets dressed and is ready to go, but the limo that Victoria arranged is towed away. They take Victoria's car, but it breaks down. While Mike is anxiously waiting for Molly, Carl ends up proposing and makes everything worse. Molly finally arrives and Mike is relieved. Mike and Molly finally get married.

== Ratings ==
Episode #	Title	Air Date	Rating/Share (18–49)	Viewers (millions)	DVR 18-49	DVR Viewers (millions)	Total 18-49	Total viewers (millions)
1	"Goin' Fishin'"	September 26, 2011	4.8/11	13.86				
2	"Dennis's Birthday"	October 3, 2011	4.3/10	13.20				
3	"Mike in the House"	October 10, 2011	3.9/9	11.65	0.8		4.7	
4	"'57 Chevy Bel Air"	October 17, 2011	3.9/9	11.51	0.8		4.7	
5	"Victoria Runs Away"	October 24, 2011	4.2/10	12.19	0.8	1.84	5.0	14.02
6	"Happy Halloween"	October 31, 2011	3.7/9	11.45	0.9		4.6	
7	"Carl Meets a Lady"	November 7, 2011	4.2/10	11.93	0.9	2.23	5.1	14.17
8	"Peggy Gets a Job"	November 14, 2011	4.4/10	12.18		2.08		14.26
9	"Mike Cheats"	November 21, 2011	4.2/10	13.05	0.8	1.96	5.0	15.01
10	"Molly Needs a Number"	December 5, 2011	4.2/10	12.66	0.8	2.04	5.0	14.70
11	"Christmas Break"	December 12, 2011	4.0/9	12.77	0.9	2.04	4.9	14.81
12	"Carl Has Issues"	January 2, 2012	3.8/9	11.90	0.9	1.82	4.7	13.72
13	"Victoria Can't Drive"	January 16, 2012	3.8/9	11.09				
14	"Joyce's Choices"	February 6, 2012	3.4/8	10.95				
15	"Valentine's Piggyback"	February 13, 2012	3.4/8	10.91				
16	"Surprise"	February 20, 2012	3.4/8	11.33	0.9		4.3	
17	"Mike Likes Lasagne"	February 27, 2012	2.9/7	10.12	0.9		3.8	
18	"Peggy Goes to Branson"	March 19, 2012	3.1/8	9.71	0.8	1.91	3.9	11.62
19	"Molly Can't Lie"	April 9, 2012	3.2/8	9.58	0.8	1.89	4.0	11.47
20	"The Dress"	April 16, 2012	3.1/8	9.54	0.8	2.03	3.9	11.57
21	"Bachelor/Bachelorette"	April 30, 2012	3.2/8	10.16				
22	"The Rehearsal"	May 7, 2012	3.1/8	10.14		1.96		12.10
23	"The Wedding"	May 14, 2012	3.4/9	11.79	0.7	1.80	4.1	13.59
