= Mike & Molly season 3 =

Mike & Molly
- Season 3
- DVD cover
- Starring: Billy Gardell; Melissa McCarthy; Reno Wilson; Katy Mixon; Nyambi Nyambi; Rondi Reed; Cleo King; Louis Mustillo; David Anthony Higgins; Swoosie Kurtz
- No. of episodes: 23

Release
- Original network: CBS
- Original release: September 24, 2012 – May 30, 2013

Season chronology
- ← Previous; Season 2 Next → Season 4

The third season of the television comedy series Mike & Molly began airing on September 24, 2012 on CBS in the United States. The season is produced by Chuck Lorre Productions and Warner Bros. Television, with series creator Mark Roberts serving as executive producer along with Chuck Lorre and Don Foster. On March 14, 2012, CBS renewed Mike & Molly for a third season.

The series focuses on the title characters Mike Biggs (Billy Gardell) and Molly Flynn (Melissa McCarthy), a couple who meet at an Overeaters Anonymous meeting in Chicago, Illinois. After Molly, a primary-school teacher, invites police officer Mike to give a talk to her class, they begin dating. Mike and Molly live in the home of Molly's mother Joyce (Swoosie Kurtz) and sister Victoria (Katy Mixon). Joyce is in an on-off relationship with widower Vince Moranto (Louis Mustillo), who is often seen at the house. Mike is regularly kept company by his best friend and partner in the police force, Carl McMillan (Reno Wilson). Other prominent characters in the series include Carl's grandmother Rosetta (Cleo King); Mike's mother Peggy (Rondi Reed) and cafe worker Samuel (Nyambi Nyambi). David Anthony Higgins, who plays the role of Harry, was upgraded to series regular status for this season. Season three of Mike & Molly was broadcast in the United States on Mondays at 9:30 P.M. following 2 Broke Girls.

== Cast ==
=== Main ===
- Billy Gardell as Mike Biggs (23 episodes)
- Melissa McCarthy as Molly Flynn (23 episodes)
- Reno Wilson as Carl McMillan (23 episodes)
- Katy Mixon as Victoria Flynn (23 episodes)
- Nyambi Nyambi as Samuel (22 episodes)
- Rondi Reed as Peggy Biggs (8 episodes)
- Cleo King as Rosetta McMillan 'Nana' (7 episodes)
- Louis Mustillo as Vince Moranto (21 episodes)
- David Anthony Higgins as Harry (6 episodes)
- Swoosie Kurtz as Joyce Flynn (23 episodes)

=== Recurring and guest appearances ===
- Gerald McRaney as Captain Patrick
- Holly Robinson Peete as Christina
- Reginald VelJohnson as Brother Heywood
- Matt Battaglia as Rob
- LaMonica Garrett as James
- Elizabeth Sung as Tammy
- Jon Polito as Frankie
- Lamont Thompson as Andre
- Dave "Gruber" Allen as Tom
- Brendan Patrick Connor as George
- Justin Lawrence as Mark
- Marianne Muellerleile as Connie
- Cheryl Hawker as Lynette
- Nosheen Phoenix as Shyama
- Tim Conway as Brian
- Josh Braaten as David
- Jim Beaver as Dwight

== Episodes ==
No. overall	No. in season	Title	Directed by	Written by	Original release date	Prod. code	U.S. viewers (millions)
48	1	"The Honeymoon Is Over"	Mark Roberts	Story by : Mark Roberts & Don Foster; Teleplay by : Al Higgins & Mark Gross	September 24, 2012	2J6751	9.45
After being initially against honeymooning in Paris, Mike has become so inspired by the city that he wants to change his life and travel the world. Meanwhile, Molly worries how the other members of her household fared while they were gone.
49	2	"Vince Takes a Bath"	Jason Alexander	Story by : Mark Roberts & Don Foster; Teleplay by : Al Higgins & Julie Bean	October 1, 2012	2J6752	8.52
As Mike and Molly get started on their post-wedding thank-you notes; Vince throws out his back. Joyce conveniently disappears, leaving Mike and Molly (mostly Molly) to attend to Vince's needs.
50	3	"Mike Likes Cake"	Phill Lewis	Story by : Mark Roberts & Don Foster; Teleplay by : Al Higgins & Carla Filisha	October 8, 2012	2J6753	8.67
Christina tells Carl that she's trying to reconcile with her ex-husband for the sake of their son, leaving Carl devastated. Molly is frustrated while putting together her wedding album, as Mike appears to have his eyes closed or is eating something in every photo. Molly asks Harry to edit their wedding video, but the first cut has way too many shots of Victoria's cleavage.
51	4	"Molly in the Middle"	Phill Lewis	Story by : Mark Roberts & Don Foster; Teleplay by : Al Higgins & Julie Bean & Carla Filisha	October 15, 2012	2J6754	9.10
Mike and Molly decide they want to start trying to have a child. Carl is upset to learn that Molly still wants to be friends with Christina. Molly is unsure how to handle the situation, until Christina has some very unkind words to say regarding Carl, causing Molly to end their friendship.
52	5	"Mike's Boss"	Phill Lewis	Story by : Mark Roberts & Don Foster; Teleplay by : Al Higgins & Julie Bean	November 5, 2012	2J6755	8.78
Mike's boss, Captain Murphy (Gerald McRaney), offers him court-side basketball tickets, but only if Mike will set him up on a date with Peggy.
53	6	"Yard Sale"	Phill Lewis	Story by : Mark Roberts & Al Higgins; Teleplay by : Don Foster & Carla Filisha & Mark Gross	November 12, 2012	2J6756	9.24
With the house feeling too cramped and crowded, Joyce suggests Mike and Molly move into the basement, which prompts Molly to hold a yard sale to dispose of the basement's contents. Meanwhile, Mike and the guys take Carl on a fishing trip to help him forget his breakup with Christina.
54	7	"Thanksgiving Is Cancelled"	Phill Lewis	Story by : Mark Roberts & Don Foster; Teleplay by : Al Higgins & Mark Gross	November 19, 2012	2J6758	9.25
With Mike sick, Molly is happy she doesn't have to cook Thanksgiving dinner. But Vince insists on a home cooked meal when he learns his brother (Jon Polito) will be attending, and Joyce becomes furious with Vince for not discussing a wedding date after they have been engaged for more than a year. Meanwhile, Carl and Samuel attend a "singles" Thanksgiving meal at Carl's church in hopes of meeting available women.
55	8	"Mike Likes Briefs"	Phill Lewis	Story by : Mark Roberts & Don Foster; Teleplay by : Al Higgins & Julie Bean	November 26, 2012	2J6757	11.29
Mike and Molly are trying (and trying and trying) to get pregnant. When Carl convinces Mike that his "tighty-whitey" briefs may be impeding his "swimmers," Mike reluctantly buys boxer shorts.
56	9	"Mike Takes a Test"	Phill Lewis	Story by : Mark Roberts & Don Foster; Teleplay by : Al Higgins & Mark Gross	December 3, 2012	2J6760	10.23
During an uncomfortable dinner with Peggy and Captain Murphy, the Captain suggests that Mike take a detective's exam. Thinking the higher salary might come in handy with a possible new baby, Molly initially encourages Mike to take the exam. But she soon regrets her decision when Mike spends more time studying than trying to make a baby with her.
57	10	"Karaoke Christmas"	Phill Lewis	Story by : Mark Roberts & Don Foster; Teleplay by : Al Higgins & Mark Gross & Carla Filisha	December 17, 2012	2J6761	10.79
Dressed as Santa Claus and frustrated about Molly's holiday spending, Mike cautions children about using credit cards to buy toys. Later, Molly's family has their traditional Christmas at home, including fun with a karaoke machine, but Mike and Molly must spend Christmas Eve at church with his mother and boss.
58	11	"Fish for Breakfast"	Phill Lewis	Story by : Mark Roberts & Don Foster; Teleplay by : Al Higgins & Carla Filisha	January 14, 2013	2J6759	11.46
Mike is frustrated with having to join Molly in her limited diet of "fertility" foods. Elsewhere, Rosetta has grown weary of Carl bringing home one disreputable woman after another since his breakup with Christina, and she kicks him out of her house.
59	12	"Molly's Birthday"	Mark Roberts	Story by : Mark Roberts & Don Foster; Teleplay by : Al Higgins & Julie Bean	January 21, 2013	2J6762	10.89
Mike plans to spoil Molly for her birthday, but soon after, Victoria's drug dealer Tom (Dave Allen) arrives to stay at the Flynn's house for a few days. This causes a rift between the sisters, especially after Mike eats some "special" gelato that Tom prepared.
60	13	"Carl Gets a Roommate"	Mark Roberts	Story by : Mark Roberts & Don Foster; Teleplay by : Al Higgins & Julie Bean & Carla Filisha	February 4, 2013	2J6763	10.77
Though living in his own place, Carl continues to show up at Rosetta's house to eat her meals and get his laundry done. When Samuel moves in, Carl expects him to do his bidding as Grandma did. Meanwhile, Mike is trying to panel the basement. After some mishaps with Molly and Vince helping, he ultimately tricks Samuel and Carl into finishing the paneling for him.
61	14	"The Princess and the Troll"	Phill Lewis	Story by : Mark Roberts; Teleplay by : Don Foster & Mark Gross & Brian Keith Etheridge	February 11, 2013	2J6764	10.50
Molly wants to set up a Valentine's Day date between Victoria and a lonely Harry. Mike is sceptical but goes along with the plan, and is surprised when Victoria agrees. Meanwhile Carl takes Samuel to a laundromat to pick up women.
62	15	"Mike the Tease"	Phill Lewis	Story by : Mark Roberts; Teleplay by : Al Higgins & Julie Bean & Carla Filisha	February 18, 2013	2J6765	10.33
Molly's test results from her OB-Gyn are in, and she is producing eggs just fine. So her latest negative pregnancy test sends Mike to a fertility clinic and to his mother to seek some answers. Determined to be more than just a "man-whore" to Joyce, Vince begins a new job as a door-to-door vacuum salesman.
63	16	"Molly's New Shoes"	Phill Lewis	Story by : Mark Roberts; Teleplay by : Don Foster & Al Higgins & Mark Gross	February 25, 2013	2J6766	9.79
When Mike's boss tells him he plans to marry Peggy and move her to Arizona, Mike gets upset and leaves Molly alone in the mall. A line spoken by Peggy—"Arizona? Why should I go to Arizona? It's nothing but a furnace full of drunk Indians"— prompted calls for an apology by the Native American Journalists Association, among others.
64	17	"St. Patrick's Day"	Phill Lewis	Story by : Mark Roberts; Teleplay by : Julie Bean & Carla Filisha	March 18, 2013	2J6767	8.38
Mike and Molly continue pregnancy attempts and almost miss Carl and Samuel's St Patrick's Day party. Also, Victoria kisses Harry after he helps her with a college assignment, but the kiss prompts a major announcement from Harry.
65	18	"Spring Break"	Phill Lewis	Story by : Mark Roberts; Teleplay by : Don Foster & Al Higgins & Mark Gross	March 25, 2013	2J6768	8.99
Mike works some overtime in a morgue while Molly goes with Victoria to Florida for spring break, but Mike realizes he wants to be with Molly when she calls him with a bad sunburn.
66	19	"Party Planners"	Phill Lewis	Story by : Mark Roberts; Teleplay by : Mark Gross & Brian Keith Etheridge	April 15, 2013	2J6769	7.76
Mike hopes for Molly and Peggy to get along, but they disagree about plans for Mike's birthday party. Meanwhile, Carl and Samuel vie for the attention of a hot, new employee at Abe's diner.
67	20	"Mike Can't Read"	Mark Roberts	Story by : Mark Roberts; Teleplay by : Don Foster & Julie Bean & Carla Filisha	April 29, 2013	2J6770	8.14
Mike and Molly decide their pre-baby lives could use some fun new hobbies, so they take up roller skating. Molly and Victoria find some old sketches that Joyce drew before having children, and they encourage her to take art classes at a local college despite Vince's protests.
68	21	"Molly's Out of Town"	Mark Roberts	Story by : Mark Roberts; Teleplay by : Don Foster & Al Higgins & Brian Keith Etheridge	May 6, 2013	2J6772	8.08
With Molly gone to a teacher's conference, Mike goes on a junk food binge. Meanwhile, Joyce is in her annual spring cleaning mode which has the entire household (sans Molly) on edge, and Carl is devastated when he runs into Christina's husband and finds out she's pregnant.
69	22	"School Recital"	Mark Roberts	Story by : Mark Roberts; Teleplay by : Don Foster & Al Higgins & Mark Gross	May 13, 2013	2J6771	8.31
Molly is so focused on directing a school recital that she doesn't realize a fellow teacher is hitting on her. Meanwhile, Vince convinces Mike to join him in an unusual money-making scheme.
70	23	"Windy City"	Mark Roberts	Story by : Mark Roberts; Teleplay by : Don Foster & Mark Roberts	May 30, 2013	2J6773	8.01
Mike and Carl work at a renaissance faire after their boss is dumped by Mike's mother. Mike confesses important news to Molly as a tornado hits Chicago. Note: This episode was pre-empted on its original May 20th airing date by CBS out of sensitivity to the 2013 Moore tornado, and was rescheduled to air May 30. In the original broadcast in Canada (which was previously set to premiere the same time on CBS) saw Molly reveal that she was in fact pregnant. However this was removed from the episode when it later aired on CBS (and the subsequent DVD release) and the storyline was wrapped up in the premiere of Season 4. Molly's inability to get pregnant was given as one of the stressors leading to her breakdown.

== Ratings ==
Episode #	Title	Air Date	Rating/Share (18–49)	Viewers (millions)	DVR 18-49	DVR Viewers (millions)	Total 18-49	Total viewers (millions)
1	The Honeymoon Is Over	September 24, 2012	3.1/7	9.45				
2	Vince Takes a Bath	October 1, 2012	2.9/7	8.52	0.9	2.37	3.8	10.89
3	Mike Likes Cake	October 8, 2012	2.8/7	8.67				
4	Molly in the Middle	October 15, 2012	3.0/7	9.10		1.90		11.00
5	Mike's Boss	November 5, 2012	2.8/7	8.78	0.7		3.5	
6	Yard Sale	November 12, 2012	3.0/7	9.24	1.0	2.40	4.0	11.64
7	Thanksgiving Is Cancelled	November 19, 2012	2.9/7	9.25	0.8	2.07	3.7	11.32
8	Mike Likes Briefs	November 26, 2012	3.6/9	11.29				
9	Mike Takes a Test	December 3, 2012	3.1/8	10.23	0.8	1.90	3.9	12.13
10	Karaoke Christmas	December 17, 2012	3.3/8	10.79	0.7	1.91	4.0	12.70
11	Fish for Breakfast	January 14, 2013	3.5/8	11.46	0.9	2.19	4.4	13.64
12	Molly's Birthday	January 21, 2013	3.3/8	10.89	0.9	2.00	4.2	12.89
13	Carl Gets a Roommate	February 4, 2013	3.2/10	10.77				
14	The Princess and the Troll	February 11, 2013	3.0/7	10.50	0.8	2.09	3.8	12.60
15	Mike the Tease	February 18, 2013	3.2/8	10.33	0.9	2.25	4.1	12.59
16	Molly's New Shoes	February 25, 2013	2.7/7	9.79	0.8	1.76	3.5	11.55
17	St. Patrick's Day	March 18, 2013	2.4/6	8.38	0.9	2.08	3.3	10.46
18	Spring Break	March 25, 2013	2.6/6	8.99	0.8	2.12	3.4	11.11
19	Party Planners	April 15, 2013	2.2/5	7.76	0.9	2.39	3.1	10.15
20	Mike Can't Read	April 29, 2013	2.4/6	8.14	0.9	2.30	3.3	10.44
21	Molly's Out of Town	May 6, 2013	2.3/6	8.08	0.8	2.20	3.1	10.28
22	School Recital	May 13, 2013	2.4/6	8.31	0.9	2.14	3.3	10.45
23	Windy City	May 30, 2013	1.9/6	8.01				
