= Mike & Molly season 5 =

Mike & Molly
- Season 5
- Starring: Billy Gardell; Melissa McCarthy; Reno Wilson; Katy Mixon; Nyambi Nyambi; Rondi Reed; Louis Mustillo; David Anthony Higgins; Swoosie Kurtz
- No. of episodes: 22

Release
- Original network: CBS
- Original release: December 8, 2014 – May 18, 2015

Season chronology
- ← Previous; Season 4 Next → Season 6

The fifth season of the television comedy series Mike & Molly began airing on December 8, 2014, in its new Monday at 8:30 pm timeslot and concluded on May 18, 2015, on CBS in the United States. The season is produced by Chuck Lorre Productions and Warner Bros. Television, with series showrunner Al Higgins serving as executive producer along with Chuck Lorre. On March 13, 2014, CBS renewed Mike & Molly for a fifth season. This season also featured its 100th episode. On November 17, 2014, it was announced that the fifth season would premiere on December 8, 2014, replacing cancelled comedy The Millers.

The series focuses on the title characters Mike Biggs (Billy Gardell) and Molly Flynn (Melissa McCarthy), a couple who meet at an Overeaters Anonymous meeting in Chicago, Illinois. After Molly, a primary-school teacher (changing career to author in season 4), invites police officer Mike to give a talk to her class, they begin dating. As of the end of season 2, the two are married. Mike and Molly live in the home of Molly's mother Joyce (Swoosie Kurtz) and sister Victoria (Katy Mixon). Joyce is married to widower Vince Moranto (Louis Mustillo). Mike is regularly kept company by his best friend and partner in the police force, Carl McMillan (Reno Wilson). Other prominent characters in the series include Mike's mother Peggy (Rondi Reed), cafe worker/owner Samuel (Nyambi Nyambi), and Mike and Molly's friend and co-Overeaters Anonymous member Harry (David Anthony Higgins).

== Cast ==
=== Main ===
- Billy Gardell as Mike Biggs (22 episodes)
- Melissa McCarthy as Molly Flynn (22 episodes)
- Reno Wilson as Carl McMillan (22 episodes)
- Katy Mixon as Victoria Flynn (22 episodes)
- Nyambi Nyambi as Samuel / Babatunde (18 episodes)
- Rondi Reed as Peggy Biggs (14 episodes)
- Louis Mustillo as Vince Moranto (22 episodes)
- David Anthony Higgins as Harry (7 episodes)
- Swoosie Kurtz as Joyce Flynn (22 episodes)

=== Special guest stars ===
- Margo Martindale as Rosemary Ritter
- Kathy Bates as Kay McKinnon

=== Recurring and guest appearances ===
- Cleo King as Rosetta McMillan 'Nana'
- Casey Washington as Officer Ramirez
- Jenny O'Hara as Mikey
- Patricia Belcher as Rose
- Peggy Miley as Joan
- Sarah Baker as Stacey
- Beth Lacke as Karen
- Lauri Johnson as Ann
- Jim Holmes as Dr. Wexler
- Steve Valentine as Xander Van Xander
- Becky O'Donahue as Charisma
- Josh Dean as Father Justin
- Marianne Muellerleile as Connie
- Cheryl Hawker as Lynette
- Joel Murray as Dr. Jeffries
- Eric Allan Kramer as Officer Seely
- Brendan Patrick Connor as George
- Edie McClurg as Paula Martin
- Maile Flanagan as Darlene
- Stefanie Black as Stephanie

== Episodes ==
No. overall	No. in season	Title	Directed by	Written by	Original release date	Prod. code	U.S. viewers (millions)
93	1	"The Book of Molly"	Michael McDonald	Story by : Chuck Lorre & Al Higgins; Teleplay by : Julie Bean & Mark Gross & Carla Filisha	December 8, 2014	3J5001	8.06
Molly returns from her writer's workshop, much to Mike's delight. Even better, a publisher liked Molly's short story enough to give her a sizeable advance on her first book. Mike is relieved because the advance check will almost get him and Molly out of debt, but Molly ruins that when she buys a new car for him instead, leading to tension between them that is resolved when Mike's ancient car finally dies and the new vehicle is needed.
94	2	"To Have and Withhold"	Michael McDonald	Story by : Chuck Lorre & Al Higgins; Teleplay by : Mark Gross & Carla Filisha & Bill Daly	December 15, 2014	3J5002	7.85
Molly has writer's block, and she might lose her big advance if she doesn't cure it fast. Carl suggests to Mike that getting sex regularly since returning from her workshop has stifled Molly's creativity. Mike then reluctantly tries to shun Molly's sexual advances.
95	3	"Tis the Season to Be Molly"	Michael McDonald	Story by : Al Higgins & Brian Keith Etheridge; Teleplay by : Bill Daly & Rob DesHotel & Michael Glouberman	December 22, 2014	3J5014	8.52
Mike (as Santa Claus) and Carl (as an elf) hand out toys to needy children, then get locked in the back of a truck while loading it. At home, Molly has the whole family on edge as she insists on every holiday preparation being done to her exact specifications. While it is revealed that she does this to honour her late father, Vince is left distraught when Molly lashes out at him and he feels that the Flynn family has never really accepted him, and Molly finally apologizes to him after prompting from Joyce.
96	4	"Gone Cheatin"	Michael McDonald	Story by : Chuck Lorre & Al Higgins; Teleplay by : Carla Filisha & Bill Daly & Rob DesHotel	December 29, 2014	3J5003	8.32
Mike, Carl, Samuel, Vince and Harry are preparing for their annual "guys weekend" fishing trip, when Carl irritates the group by announcing he has invited Victoria. This causes Mike to feel like he has to invite Molly, and Vince follows suit by inviting Joyce. As they get ready to leave, Victoria tells Molly she has cheated on Carl with an old boyfriend, leading to an awkward drive to the fishing site as Molly hides what she knows from Mike.
97	5	"Molly's Neverending Story"	David Trainer	Story by : Al Higgins; Teleplay by : Bill Daly & Rob DesHotel & Michael Glouberman	January 5, 2015	3J5005	9.64
The family is exasperated after Molly proclaims her book is finished, only to decide she wants to tweak the characters again or make it raunchier as suggested by Peggy's surprisingly filthy church friends, Mikey (Jenny O'Hara), Rose (Patricia Belcher) and Joan (Peggy Miley). Mike says she should be confident in her work, then quickly emails the file to Molly's publisher. After Molly becomes furious, Mike hires Harry to hack into the publisher's computer.
98	6	"The Last Temptation of Mike"	David Trainer	Story by : Al Higgins; Teleplay by : Bill Daly & Rob DesHotel & Michael Glouberman	January 12, 2015	3J5004	9.19
A rookie female cop named Stacey (Sarah Baker) playfully flirts with Mike at work, but things escalate when she surprises him with a kiss after hours. A guilt-ridden Mike decides to tell Molly, who then goes on the attack.
99	7	"Support Your Local Samuel"	Carole Lazarus	Story by : Chuck Lorre & Al Higgins; Teleplay by : Brian Etheridge & Crystal Jenkins & Aaron Vaccaro	January 19, 2015	3J5007	9.22
Samuel contemplates moving back to Africa when he receives a letter from his parents saying they're struggling financially. Instead, he assumes ownership of Abe's Hot Beef when the owner says he's looking to unload it on anyone willing to take on the debt. With financial help from Vince, Samuel takes over the restaurant and stays in America.
100	8	"Mike Check"	Melissa McCarthy	Story by : Chuck Lorre & Al Higgins; Teleplay by : Julie Bean & Mark Gross & Carla Filisha	February 2, 2015	3J5008	9.87
When Molly finds out that Mike hasn't had any doctor check-ups in years, she nags him into going. The first time around, Mike skips the visit and pretends he went, but Molly sees through it.
101	9	"Hack to the Future"	David Trainer	Story by : Chuck Lorre & Al Higgins; Teleplay by : Michael Glouberman & Brian Etheridge & Crystal Jenkins	February 9, 2015	3J5006	9.32
Molly meets Xander (Steve Valentine), her publisher, for the first time. While he is praiseworthy, he feels the book could become a phenomenon if Molly works time travel into it. Expecting a big windfall upon hearing the news, Mike splurges on some new clothing. After several failed attempts at doing the publisher's bidding, however, Molly ultimately tricks him into accepting her original draft.
102	10	"Checkpoint Joyce"	Victor Gonzalez	Story by : Al Higgins & Mark Gross; Teleplay by : Julie Bean & Aaron Vaccaro & Marla Dumont	February 16, 2015	3J5009	9.32
While Mike and Carl are working a drunk driving checkpoint, Joyce pulls up. Mike intends to let her through after she answers a few questions, but she is belligerent and insulting so he hauls her into the station. After a few members of the household suggest to Joyce that she cut back on her drinking, she lashes out and insists that they all give up their various vices, before she finally approaches both the situation and Mike with some maturity.
103	11	"Immaculate Deception"	Victor Gonzalez	Story by : Chuck Lorre & Al Higgins; Teleplay by : Marla Dumont & Julie Bean & Mark Gross	February 23, 2015	3J5010	8.91
Mike and Molly finally have the house to themselves for the weekend, but the good times come to an end for Mike when he learns Molly has resumed using birth control without telling him.
104	12	"The World According to Peggy"	Victor Gonzalez	Story by : Al Higgins & Carla Filisha; Teleplay by : Crystal Jenkins & Aaron Vaccaro & Marla DuMont	March 2, 2015	3J5011	9.65
Peggy announces that she is retiring, and Molly organizes a party for her. She goes to the school to invite some fellow lunch ladies, and learns that Peggy didn't retire, she was fired. While Mike first insists that they go along with Peggy's lying in order to keep the peace, he eventually gets fed up with her and lashes out by telling her "you're bitter and toxic, and that's why nobody wants you around"; Molly then reaches out to Peggy about the virtues of sometimes admitting to being wrong.
105	13	"Buy the Book"	Michael McDonald	Story by : Chuck Lorre & Al Higgins; Teleplay by : Mark Gross & Carla Filisha & Bill Daly	March 9, 2015	3J5012	8.80
Molly is thrilled to see her book in print, but now comes the difficult task of trying to market it. In the midst of her frustration, however, Molly gets an idea for a follow-up book from an unlikely source: Peggy.
106	14	"What Ever Happened to Baby Peggy?"	Michael McDonald	Story by : Al Higgins & Michael Glouberman; Teleplay by : Carla Filisha & Bill Daly & Rob Deshotel	March 16, 2015	3J5013	8.57
While interviewing Peggy to get a back story for the next book, Molly comes across a corn husk doll that Peggy's own mother made for her. Peggy clams up and won't speak about her past anymore, then later shows up drunk at the Flynn house. Mike insists his family doesn't talk about their feelings, but Molly persists and eventually gets to the very sad root of Peggy's misgivings. When Mike finds out from Molly, he leaves to go hug his mom.
107	15	"Pie Fight"	Michael McDonald	Story by : Al Higgins & Bill Daly; Teleplay by : Rob DesHotel & Michael Glouberman & Brian Keith Etheridge	March 23, 2015	3J5015	7.77
After eating a piece of pie at Abe's and then finding he's gained several pounds, he decides to not eat at all the next day. This only makes Mike irritable and he punches a fellow officer (Eric Allan Kramer), getting himself suspended and ending in a useful therapy session with Dr. Jeffries (Joel Murray), where he painfully confronts how much it hurts him to be chronically overweight.
108	16	"Cocktails and Calamine"	Michael McDonald	Story by : Al Higgins & Rob Deshotel; Teleplay by : Michael Glouberman & Brian Keith Etheridge & Crystal Jenkins	March 30, 2015	3J5016	7.65
Molly doesn't want Mike to know about a highbrow party for fellow writers she's been invited to. When he finds out, she tells him she doesn't think he'd enjoy it, but she's secretly afraid to take him because he might do or say something stupid. At the party, she then insults Mike, who is hurt and leaves without her, but the two of them later patch up any differences.
109	17	"Mudlick or Bust"	Michael McDonald	Story by : Al Higgins & Marla DuMont; Teleplay by : Brian Keith Etheridge & Crystal Jenkins & Aaron Vaccaro	April 13, 2015	3J5017	7.49
Needing to get a better feel for Peggy's home town to write her story, Molly decides the two must take a road trip to Mudlick, Missouri. Molly secretly arranges a reunion between Peggy and her estranged sister Rosemary (Margo Martindale), which turns out badly when it is clear that Rosemary still harbors a 50-year-old grudge. At home, Vince gets Mike involved in betting on the NCAA basketball tournament games.
110	18	"No Kay Morale"	Melissa McCarthy	Story by : Al Higgins & Julie Bean; Teleplay by : Crystal Jenkins & Aaron Vaccaro & Marla DuMont	April 20, 2015	3J5018	8.13
Kay (Kathy Bates) returns, and Peggy and Molly fight for her attention as usual. Molly notices Kay has lost her joy and drive, the result of a tragedy Kay encountered overseas, and tries to help her find it again. Meanwhile, Mike and Carl deal with a protest downtown that Kay surprisingly becomes a part of.
111	19	"Mother From Another Mudlick"	Michael McDonald	Story by : Al Higgins & Aaron Vaccaro; Teleplay by : Marla DuMont & Julie Bean & Mark Gross	April 27, 2015	3J5020	7.19
Their feud ended, Rosemary pays a visit to Peggy's home and quickly makes friends among the gang with her cooking skills and cheerful nature. As Mike gets to know his aunt, he learns that Rosemary was clearly favoured by her parents growing up, while Peggy was shunned.
112	20	"Fight to the Finish"	Stephen Prime	Story by : Al Higgins & Connor Kilpatrick & Kevin Lappin; Teleplay by : Bill Daly & Rob DesHotel & Michael Glouberman	May 4, 2015	3J5022	6.79
Molly gets frustrated with Peggy always doing something else around the house instead of helping her finish the book. In the end, the book gets done, and Peggy grudgingly admits she didn't want it to get finished because it would mean she and Molly won't be hanging together as much. Meanwhile, Mike gets into a brief discussion with Molly that makes her mad, so he later asks Victoria and Joyce to give him lessons on what he did wrong.
113	21	"Near Death Do Us Part"	Joel Murray	Story by : Al Higgins & Crystal Jenkins; Teleplay by : Aaron Vaccaro & Marla DuMont & Julie Bean	May 11, 2015	3J5019	7.69
After Carl and Mike have a near-death experience while on duty, Carl tells Mike he's going to propose to Victoria. Mike can't keep the secret and tells Molly, who in turn blabs to Victoria and Joyce. This becomes an issue when Carl later tells Mike he's changed his mind and doesn't want to propose to Victoria yet, one that ultimately leads to a fight and a bitter breakup.
114	22	"The Bitter Man and the Sea"	Victor Gonzalez	Story by : Al Higgins & Jim Patterson; Teleplay by : Julie Bean & Mark Gross & Carla Filisha	May 18, 2015	3J5021	7.75
It's Mike and Molly's third anniversary, and Mike makes plans to take Molly and the family on a cruise of Lake Michigan. However, bad blood is still lingering between Carl and Victoria, so Mike has to uninvite Carl even though Carl gave him the idea for the cruise. While Molly is thrilled with the cruise, the situation puts Mike's relationship with his partner and best friend in jeopardy.

== Ratings ==
=== Live and DVR ratings ===
No.	Title	Air Date	Rating/Share (18–49)	Viewers (millions)	DVR 18-49	DVR Viewers (millions)	Total 18-49	Total viewers (millions)
1	"The Book of Molly"	December 8, 2014	1.9/6	8.06				
2	"To Have and Withhold"	December 15, 2014	1.8/5	7.85	0.5	1.43	2.3	9.28
3	"Tis the Season to Be Molly"	December 22, 2014	1.7/5	8.52	0.5	1.46	2.2	9.98
4	"Gone Cheatin"	December 29, 2014	1.8/6	8.32	0.6	1.72	2.4	10.04
5	"Molly's Neverending Story"	January 5, 2015	2.2/6	9.64				
6	"The Last Temptation of Mike"	January 12, 2015	2.1/6	9.19				
7	"Support Your Local Samuel"	January 19, 2015	2.1/6	9.22				
8	"Mike Check"	February 2, 2015	2.2/6	9.87				
9	"Hack to the Future"	February 9, 2015	2.2/6	9.32				
10	"Checkpoint Joyce"	February 16, 2015	2.2/6	9.32				
11	"Immaculate Deception"	February 23, 2015	2.0/6	8.91				
12	"The World According to Peggy"	March 2, 2015	2.2/7	9.65				
13	"Buy the Book"	March 9, 2015	2.1/7	8.80				
14	"What Ever Happened to Baby Peggy?"	March 16, 2015	2.0/6	8.57	0.6	1.76	2.6	10.33
15	"Pie Fight"	March 23, 2015	1.9/6	7.77				
16	"Cocktails and Calamine"	March 30, 2015	1.8/6	7.65				
17	"Mudlick or Bust"	April 13, 2015	1.8/6	7.49				
18	"No Kay Morale"	April 20, 2015	2.0/6	8.13				
19	"Mother From Another Mudlick"	April 27, 2015	1.7/5	7.19				
20	"Fight to the Finish"	May 4, 2015	1.6/5	6.79				
21	"Near Death Do Us Part"	May 11, 2015	1.7/6	7.69		1.83		9.52
22	"The Bitter Man and the Sea"	May 18, 2015	1.9/6	7.75	0.6	1.80	2.5	9.55
