= Mike & Molly season 6 =

Mike & Molly
- Season 6
- Starring: Billy Gardell; Melissa McCarthy; Reno Wilson; Katy Mixon; Nyambi Nyambi; Rondi Reed; Louis Mustillo; Swoosie Kurtz
- No. of episodes: 13

Release
- Original network: CBS
- Original release: January 6 – May 16, 2016

Season chronology
- ← Previous; Season 5

The sixth and final season of American comedy television series Mike & Molly was ordered on March 12, 2015, by CBS. The season premiered on January 6, 2016, in the United States on CBS, and the finale aired on May 16, 2016. The season consisted of 13 episodes.

The season is produced by Chuck Lorre Productions and Warner Bros. Television, with series showrunner Al Higgins serving as executive producer along with Chuck Lorre. Despite good ratings, CBS only ordered 13 episodes and on January 12, 2016, it was announced that the series would be cancelled. The final episode aired on May 16, 2016.

The series focuses on the title characters Mike Biggs (Billy Gardell) and Molly Flynn (Melissa McCarthy), a couple who meet at an Overeaters Anonymous meeting in Chicago. After Molly, a primary-school teacher (changing career to author in season 4), invites police officer Mike to give a talk to her class, they begin dating. As of the end of season 2, the two are married. Mike and Molly live in the home of Molly's mother Joyce (Swoosie Kurtz) and sister Victoria (Katy Mixon). Joyce is married to widower Vince Moranto (Louis Mustillo). Mike is regularly kept company by his best friend and partner in the police force, Carl McMillan (Reno Wilson). Other prominent characters in the series include Mike's mother Peggy (Rondi Reed), and cafe worker/owner Samuel (Nyambi Nyambi).

== Cast ==
=== Main ===
- Billy Gardell as Mike Biggs (13 episodes)
- Melissa McCarthy as Molly Flynn (13 episodes)
- Reno Wilson as Carl McMillan (13 episodes)
- Katy Mixon as Victoria Flynn (13 episodes)
- Nyambi Nyambi as Samuel/Babatunde (9 episodes)
- Rondi Reed as Peggy Biggs (8 episodes)
- Louis Mustillo as Vince Moranto (13 episodes)
- Swoosie Kurtz as Joyce Flynn (13 episodes)

=== Recurring and guest appearances ===
- Cleo King as Rosetta McMillan 'Nana'
- David Anthony Higgins as Harry
- Casey Washington as Officer Ramirez
- Eric Allan Kramer as Officer Seely
- Joel Murray as Dr. Jeffries
- Jack McGee as Officer Gronski
- Jamie Denbo as Officer Stoltz
- Jessica Chaffin as Allison
- Wallace Langham as Robert
- Juliette Goglia as Frannie
- Jessy Hodges as Maura
- Amy Farrington as Karen
- Rose Abdoo as Madame Vianne
- Vernee Watson as Blanche

== Episodes ==
No. overall	No. in season	Title	Directed by	Written by	Original release date	Prod. code	U.S. viewers (millions)
115	1	"Cops on the Rocks"	Michael McDonald	Story by : Al Higgins & Julie Bean; Teleplay by : Mark Gross & Carla Filisha & Bill Daly	January 6, 2016	3J6101	6.73
Still feuding, Mike and Carl both ask to be assigned different partners at work, only to find that life with their new partners is even worse. Meanwhile, Molly and Peggy have an opportunity to promote their new book on NPR, but Molly can't get Peggy to show up for the on-air interviews.
116	2	"One Small Step for Mike"	Michael McDonald	Story by : Al Higgins & Carla Filisha; Teleplay by : Bill Daly & Brian Keith Etheridge & Rob DesHotel	January 13, 2016	3J6103	7.14
Molly has taken up walking, and gets a Fitbit for herself and Mike, hoping Mike will also try to get healthier. After Mike barely puts any steps on his Fitbit the next day, he has Samuel wear it for a while. When Samuel puts on seven miles walking around at the restaurant, Mike knows Molly will be suspicious, so he acts like he lost it.
117	3	"Peg O'My Heart Attack"	Michael McDonald	Story by : Al Higgins & Mark Gross; Teleplay by : Carla Filisha & Bill Daly & Brian Keith Etheridge	January 20, 2016	3J6102	7.04
Molly invites Peggy to join her for a post-book trip, but Peggy's usual coldness towards the idea results in an argument where Molly says how terrible Peggy is but then leads to Peggy having a heart attack. Mike sides with his mother in her dispute with Molly and points out that she's always been negative and mocking towards Peggy. Molly admits she loves Peggy, and Peggy later tells Molly that she was not responsible for her heart attack but didn't understand why Molly didn't consider her a friend by now. Molly then confirms that she is Peggy's friend.
118	4	"Super Cop"	Michael McDonald	Story by : Al Higgins & Bill Daly; Teleplay by : Brian Keith Etheridge & Rob DesHotel & Michael Glouberman	January 27, 2016	3J6104	6.89
After getting his wallet stolen while taking a nap on patrol with Carl, Mike decides to heighten his enforcement of the law. However, when his new-found attitude takes a toll on those around him (especially Carl, who is disturbed that Mike now is embraced by the precinct's hard-line cops whom they both previously did not see eye to eye with) Molly must find a way to convert her husband back to his former self.
119	5	"Joyce's Will Be Done"	Michael McDonald	Story by : Al Higgins & Brian Keith Etheridge; Teleplay by : Rob DesHotel & Michael Glouberman & Steve Joe	February 3, 2016	3J6105	6.84
After her younger, health-nut yoga instructor drops dead during a session, a shaken Joyce starts to plan for her own death. Molly is thrilled when Joyce gives her a beautiful ring that belonged to her grandmother, then becomes furious when Joyce says she is leaving the house to Victoria, until a combination of Victoria showing she has her life together and Joyce having a benevolent reason for her choices placate Molly. Meanwhile, Vince and Mike ponder the possibilities of life after death.
120	6	"The Good Wife"	Michael McDonald	Story by : Al Higgins & Rob DesHotel; Teleplay by : Michael Glouberman & Steve Joe & Alex Herschlag	February 10, 2016	3J6106	6.63
Fed up with household chores not getting done while Molly skips writing to go out drinking with Joyce and Victoria, Mike speaks his mind, upsetting his wife in the process. As a result, Molly transforms into the seemingly perfect "happy homemaker" to enact her revenge.
121	7	"Weekend With Birdie"	Michael McDonald	Story by : Al Higgins & Michael Glouberman; Teleplay by : Steve Joe & Alex Herschlag & Julie Bean	April 25, 2016	3J6107	6.90
After discovering a dog left in the apartment of two arrested women, Mike decides to bring the pooch home. However, when the dog gets along with all of the family members except Molly, she begins to doubt her maternal skills.
122	8	"The Wreck of the Vincent Moranto"	Michael McDonald	Story by : Al Higgins & Steve Joe; Teleplay by : Alex Herschlag & Julie Bean & Mark Gross	May 2, 2016	3J6108	6.94
Vince sells a boat that he and Mike were remodeling together, which causes empty promises made by Mike's father come back to haunt him.
123	9	"Baby, Please Don't Go"	Michael McDonald	Story by : Al Higgins & Alex Herschlag; Teleplay by : Julie Bean & Mark Gross & Carla Filisha	May 2, 2016	3J6109	7.20
After Molly finds one of her former fourth-grade students named Frannie (Juliette Goglia) homeless and pregnant, fate presents her with an opportunity.
124	10	"Baby Bump"	Michele Azenzer Bear	Story by : Al Higgins; Teleplay by : Brian Keith Etheridge & Bill Daly & Rob DesHotel	May 9, 2016	3J6111	7.73
Fearing that she has no plans for her life post-pregnancy, Mike and Molly attempt to reconcile Frannie with her estranged sister.
125	11	"The Adoption Option"	Michael McDonald	Story by : Al Higgins & Chuck Lorre; Teleplay by : Connor Kilpatrick & Kevin Lappin & Dave Pilson	May 9, 2016	3J6110	8.06
After a successful adoption interview, Mike and Molly must overcome the hurdle of a home visit.
126	12	"Curse of the Bambino"	Melissa McCarthy	Story by : Al Higgins; Teleplay by : Michael Glouberman & Steve Joe & Alex Herschlag	May 16, 2016	3J6112	7.87
Hoping to speed along the adoption process, Molly prays with Peggy at church, while Mike visits Carl's psychic.
127	13	"I See Love"	James Burrows	Story by : Al Higgins & Chuck Lorre; Teleplay by : Julie Bean & Mark Gross & Carla Filisha	May 16, 2016	3J6113	8.45
As family and friends convene at the hospital for the birth of Mike and Molly's adopted child, who is arriving a couple of weeks early from the due date, the couple reflects on their relationship and past events leading up to the special occasion.

== Ratings ==
=== Live and DVR ratings ===
No.	Title	Air Date	Rating/Share (18–49)	Viewers (millions)	DVR 18-49	DVR Viewers (millions)	Total 18-49	Total viewers (millions)
1	"Cops on the Rocks"	January 6, 2016	1.6/5	6.73	0.8	2.11	2.4	8.84
2	"One Small Step for Mike"	January 13, 2016	1.6/5	7.14	0.6	1.70	2.2	8.84
3	"Peg O'My Heart Attack"	January 20, 2016	1.7/5	7.04				
4	"Super Cop"	January 27, 2016	1.6/5	6.89	0.6	1.77	2.2	8.66
5	"Joyce's Will Be Done"	February 3, 2016	1.6/5	6.84	0.6	1.93	2.2	8.77
6	"The Good Wife"	February 10, 2016	1.6/5	6.63				
7	"Weekend with Birdie"	April 25, 2016	1.3/4	6.90				
8	"The Wreck of the Vincent Moranto"	May 2, 2016	1.3/5	6.94				
9	"Baby, Please Don't Go"	May 2, 2016	1.4/5	7.20				
10	"Baby Bump"	May 9, 2016	1.6/6	7.73				
11	"The Adoption Option"	May 9, 2016	1.7/6	8.06				
12	"Curse of the Bambino"	May 16, 2016	1.4/5	7.87				
13	"I See Love"	May 16, 2016	1.7/6	8.45				
