= List of Mike & Molly characters =

Mike & Molly is a sitcom which premiered in September 2010. The show revolves around the lives of Mike Biggs, a police officer, and Molly Flynn, a schoolteacher, who meet at an Overeaters Anonymous meeting and fall in love. The series follows their relationship with each other and their two families.

== Overview ==
Starring

Recurring

Character	Seasons					
Character	1	2	3	4	5	6
Mike Biggs	Billy Gardell	Billy Gardell	Billy Gardell	Billy Gardell	Billy Gardell	Billy Gardell
Molly Flynn	Melissa McCarthy	Melissa McCarthy	Melissa McCarthy	Melissa McCarthy	Melissa McCarthy	Melissa McCarthy
Carl McMillan	Reno Wilson	Reno Wilson	Reno Wilson	Reno Wilson	Reno Wilson	Reno Wilson
Victoria Flynn	Katy Mixon	Katy Mixon	Katy Mixon	Katy Mixon	Katy Mixon	Katy Mixon
Joyce Flynn	Swoosie Kurtz	Swoosie Kurtz	Swoosie Kurtz	Swoosie Kurtz	Swoosie Kurtz	Swoosie Kurtz
Samuel	Nyambi Nyambi	Nyambi Nyambi	Nyambi Nyambi	Nyambi Nyambi	Nyambi Nyambi	Nyambi Nyambi
Vince Moranto	Louis Mustillo	Louis Mustillo	Louis Mustillo	Louis Mustillo	Louis Mustillo	Louis Mustillo
Peggy Biggs	Rondi Reed	Rondi Reed	Rondi Reed	Rondi Reed	Rondi Reed	Rondi Reed
Rosetta McMillan	Cleo King	Cleo King	Cleo King	Cleo King	Cleo King	Cleo King
Harry	David Anthony Higgins	David Anthony Higgins	David Anthony Higgins	David Anthony Higgins	David Anthony Higgins	David Anthony Higgins

== Main characters ==
=== Mike Biggs ===
Mike Biggs
- First appearance: "Pilot"; 1x01, September 20th, 2010
- Last appearance: "I See Love"; 6x13, May 16th, 2016
- Portrayed by: Billy Gardell

In-universe information
- Gender: Male
- Occupation: Police officer
- Family: Peggy Biggs (mother); Jack Biggs (father)
- Spouse: Molly Flynn
- Children: William Michael Biggs (Adoptive Son) Unborn Child (Currently Expecting with Molly)
- Relatives: Joyce Flynn-Moranto (mother-in-law); Mr Flynn (father-in-law; deceased); Victoria Flynn (Sister-in-law); Vincent Moranto (step-father-in-law)
- Religion: Roman Catholic
- Nationality: American

Officer Michael "Mike" Biggs, is the lead male protagonist of the series. He is introduced in the first episode as a Chicago police officer with weight issues who attends a meeting of Overeaters Anonymous. It is here that he meets Molly Flynn. After Molly asks Mike to come and speak to her class at the school where she works, they begin dating in the second episode. Mike is regularly accompanied by his best friend, Carl McMillan, his partner on the police force, whom he joins for breakfast to chat about the state of their lives at a cafe where their waiter is always Samuel, an African immigrant who likes to make fun of Mike's weight. Mike and Molly got engaged in the season 1 finale, are married in the season 2 finale, and are still trying to conceive their first child as of the Season 4 premiere. In Season 5, though, Mike finds out that Molly went back on birth control without telling him due to the pain and frustration of two years when she was unable to conceive a child, and they resolve to pursue avenues like adoption as they still love each other and want to raise kids.

=== Molly Flynn ===
Molly Flynn
- First appearance: "Pilot"; 1x01, September 20, 2010
- Last appearance: "I See Love"; 6x13, May 16, 2016
- Portrayed by: Melissa McCarthy

In-universe information
- Gender: Female
- Occupation: 4th Grade Schoolteacher (Prior to Season 1-Season 4), Writer (Season 4-Present)
- Family: Joyce Flynn-Moranto (mother); Mr Flynn (father; deceased); Victoria Flynn (Younger Sister); Vince Moranto (step-father)
- Spouse: Mike Biggs
- Children: William Michael Biggs (Adopted Son) Unborn Child (expecting with Mike)
- Relatives: Peggy Biggs (mother-in-law); Jack Biggs (father-in-law)
- Religion: Roman Catholic
- Nationality: American

Molly Flynn is the lead female protagonist of the series. She is a fourth grade school teacher who attends the same Overeaters Anonymous class as Mike. She lives with her mother Joyce and her sister Victoria, while her mother's partner Vince Moranto is often seen at the house. She is very sweet, intelligent and caring, but she can be hypersensitive and has a very bad financial history thanks to a large amount of credit card debt. She and Mike married in the season 2 finale. She and Mike spent two years trying to have a child but put those plans on hold in Season 5. In Season 4, she quits her teaching job to pursue a career as a writer, and in Season 5 she has a huge success when her literary erotica novel is published by a major company. It is later revealed in a session with a psychologist that Mike's stabilizing presence, something she hasn't had since her father died, has allowed Molly to finally feel comfortable taking risks.

Melissa McCarthy won the Primetime Emmy Award for Outstanding Lead Actress in a Comedy Series in 2011 for her portrayal of Molly Flynn.

== Supporting characters ==
=== Carl McMillan ===
Carl McMillan
- First appearance: "Pilot"; 1x01, September 20, 2010
- Last appearance: "I See Love"; 6x13, May 16, 2016
- Portrayed by: Reno Wilson

In-universe information
- Gender: Male
- Occupation: Police officer
- Family: Rosetta McMillan (maternal grandmother)
- Relatives: Victoria Flynn (girlfriend)

Officer Carlton "Carl" Enoch McMillan is Mike Biggs' best friend/surrogate brother and fellow officer on the police force. He lives with his grandma until the middle of Season 3, as he has not been able or motivated to find his own place. Until the middle of Season 2, he did not have a steady girlfriend, and Mike has frequently alluded to Carl employing prostitutes or having one-night stands with strippers. He is quick-witted with a dry sense of humor, and offers droll remarks on various situations. Carl and Samuel become roommates in Season 3, after Carl's grandma kicked him out. After a rather depressing break up with his girlfriend Christina (she leaves him for her ex-husband), he goes through a string of random women until towards the end of season 4, when he begins relationship with Molly's sister Victoria. In an episode before the Season 5 finale, this relationship sours when Carl announces to Mike that he plans to propose to Victoria, only to change his mind. Carl then gets angry with Victoria when she is relieved that he didn't propose, and that leads to a spiral in the Season 5 finale where he has broken up with her. He ends up having a huge fight with Mike when he feels like his best friend is siding with Molly's family over him, and this ultimately leads him to request a transfer so he won't have to work with Mike anymore. Eventually they work out their differences, as both of them hate their new partners and Carl defends Mike when the other cops (including several hard-core macho officers whom they both dislike) make fun of him. In the final episode, it's revealed that he and Victoria were secretly fooling around once again, but in a conversation with Peggy he admits that all of the old feelings were resurfacing, hinting that there's a possibility that they might become a couple again.

=== Victoria Flynn ===
Victoria Flynn
- First appearance: "Pilot"; 1x01, September 20, 2010
- Last appearance: "I See Love"; 6x13, May 16, 2016
- Portrayed by: Katy Mixon

In-universe information
- Gender: Female
- Occupation: mortuary cosmetologist or desairologist
- Family: Joyce Flynn-Moranto (mother); Mr Flynn (father; deceased); Molly Flynn (older sister); Vince Moranto (step-father)
- Relatives: Mike Biggs (brother-in-law); Carl McMillan (boyfriend)

Victoria Flynn is Molly's dimwitted but kind, party girl sister who is often high on marijuana. (Policemen Mike and Carl take a "don't tell, we won't ask" attitude about her drug use.) She is employed as a beautician at a funeral home. She likes to have fun and sleeps around, frequently with married men, and her combination of not being particularly bright and being a pothead leads to her often losing or misplacing major items like her car. Harry has an almost obsessive crush on her, and she has on occasion gone on dates with him just to be nice. In Season 3, she starts to realize that Harry is the only man who's ever truly cared for her, and she finally kisses him. In an odd turn of events, he then announces he's gay. As of the end of Season 4, she is in a relationship with Carl, which lasts until the penultimate episode of Season 5 when they have a bitter break up. In the series finale, it's revealed that they're sleeping together, but it is hinted that there is the possibility of it becoming more serious.

Victoria demonstrates a very kind personality consistently through the series. On the night before Mike and Molly's wedding, she has a bonding moment with Molly, telling her that she and Christina worked together and got the church and hall ready despite all the drama that took place at the rehearsal. She also gives Molly a garter to wear which she had made from one of their deceased father's blue silk ties, covering the old, new, borrowed and blue tradition all in one and stating that in a way their father would be walking down the aisle with Molly, which moved both of them to happy tears. After Mike and Peggy got into a fight regarding Mike inviting his father to his wedding, Peggy refused to attend until Victoria talked to her (see below). Peggy changed her mind and told Mike she'd be going, and that it was all right that his father could attend. When Mike wondered aloud what made her change her mind, Victoria never mentions the discussion she had with her, knowing she got through to Peggy. When shown doing her job, she treats the bodies she's tasked to do the makeup on with respect and even wishes one luck on his journey to the other side. In a conversation with Mike while at work, she regretfully reveals what she had to do to make the corpse she was working on smile, which wasn't pleasant. She also reveals that she believes no matter what happens after ones dies they should look their best, demonstrating her kind personality.

Although she is generally dimwitted, high, or drunk (often all at once), Victoria is much more intelligent than other characters give her credit for. When Peggy got into a fight with Mike and announced that she would not attend his wedding because Mike was inviting his father, it was Victoria that convinced her to reconsider by pointing out how well Mike turned out because of Peggy's influence. She also pointed out that she could use the occasion to show Mike's father how well she's done since he left, the mistake he made by leaving, gave suggestions on what she could wear to the wedding to show off her legs (complimenting on how well they've held up) and even offered to help her with her makeup for the day. On that same episode, she has a conversation with Mike about death and what happens after one dies, and even explains her party attitude (she thinks it best to have as good a time as one can while alive in case there's no afterlife). On another occasion Joyce revealed that she's leaving the house to Victoria in her will which irritated Molly (she later explained it to Molly that it wasn't because Victoria was the better choice because she'd take care of the house but because it would force Molly to leave and make a mark on the world, something Joyce was unable to do with her life). A drunk Molly tells Victoria that it was because Molly was Joyce's good daughter and Victoria was a mess. Victoria stood up to Molly, pointing out that she quit her teaching job (which resulted in Molly losing her pension and benefits) and was currently in severe debt due to her wild spending. She then revealed that all of her own credit cards were paid off, has never had nor ever will have any credit card debt and that she could afford a down payment on a house even if Joyce hadn't left her one. She also pointed out that at that moment she was sober and Molly was the mess before going upstairs to see how her stocks performed that day, demonstrating that she had good business sense, something Molly had no idea she possessed.

=== Joyce Flynn ===
Joyce Flynn-Moranto
- First appearance: "Pilot"; 1x01, September 20, 2010
- Last appearance: "I See Love"; 6x13, May 16, 2016
- Portrayed by: Swoosie Kurtz

In-universe information
- Gender: Female
- Occupation: former flight attendant
- Family: Mr Flynn (ex-husband; deceased); Vince Moranto (husband); Molly Flynn (older daughter); Victoria Flynn (younger daughter)
- Relatives: Mike Biggs (son-in-law); Carl McMillan (son-in-law)

Joyce Marilyn Flynn-Moranto is Molly and Victoria's mother. Her two daughters live in her home. She is a widow who began dating a widower named Vince Moranto in Season 1, and later became his fiancée. She is very modern and often attempts to act or dress younger than her age, and she drinks heavily. She has a hair-trigger temper and often says hurtful things to those closest to her, yet also displays a fierce protective streak towards them. For example, she acts tough and threatens a bar patron on one occasion because she was making fun of her and her daughters. Another time she initiates a bar brawl after someone asks Mike to step outside to start a fight. She is sometimes rude to Mike, but he doesn't seem to care and she ultimately respects that he doesn't let her get away with her worst behavior. An example of this is when Mike is forced to arrest her at a checkpoint because she was driving after she'd be drinking. She is extremely hostile to him for a couple of days and after Molly arranges that they talk at a neutral location Joyce reveals that she was embarrassed and realized that she ran into 'an honest cop who was only doing his job'. She frequently teases Mike for his size and eating habits, even though it is revealed in multiple conversations that her late husband was also a very large man. In the Season 3 episode "Thanksgiving Is Cancelled", she marries Vince.

=== Samuel ===
Samuel/Babatunde (Nyambi Nyambi) is a sarcastic waiter at Abe's, where Mike and Carl eat. He is often seen hanging out with Carl and Mike, and despite frequently insulting them, he is considered their friend. He is from Africa and often refers to the suffering in his home country of Senegal, from which his parents sent him to be successful. As such, he does not sympathize with most problems his restaurant patrons bring to his attention, believing them to be "petty". In seasons 1 and 2, he lives with 5 roommates who are also from Africa. He becomes Carl's roommate in Season 3. In Season 5, Samuel's real name is revealed to be Babatunde when he becomes the owner of Abe's Diner, now Abe's Hot Beef. He states the previous owner was so cheap he wouldn't buy him a badge with Babatunde on it, instead giving him a former employee's badge. He notes that the high cost of replacing the sign will keep the Abe's name intact until he can afford to proudly put up a sign for "Babatunde's Restaurant".

=== Vince Moranto ===
Vincent "Vince" Moranto (Louis Mustillo) is Joyce's on-and-off boyfriend in Season 1, who thereafter becomes her fiancé. He is a widower and tends to be chauvinistic and sarcastic, and also likes to openly discuss his sex life, one of the main reasons neither Mike nor Molly seek out his company nor spend more time around him than required. He is a high school dropout and can come across as unintelligent, though the series has shown or mentioned he had made a lot of money in the past through his various enterprises (some of which may be a bit "shady"). In the second-to-last episode of Season 2, it is revealed he is technically still married to a much older woman. (Vince claims that at the time of their marriage, the woman was "a very do-able 60-year old.") Joyce throws out Vince when she learns of the marriage at Mike & Molly's wedding rehearsal. Vince actually hadn't seen the woman in several years, outside of a few attempts to get her to sign divorce papers, which she consistently refused because Vince still owes her $2,000 "plus interest." Mike negotiates with the woman to sign the divorce papers in exchange for $5,000 from Vince and the opportunity to kick Vince in the crotch. Joyce and Vince reconcile, and in the Season 3 episode "Thanksgiving Is Cancelled", they get married. Vince put off marrying her because he was broke. Although Molly knew he was a widower, she didn't know that he was broke due to his having to take care of his late wife when she got sick and eventually died until he explained it to her. When he explained how he stayed by her side and took care of her during her illness, Molly warmed up to Vince and even helped him cook a Thanksgiving dinner that he was forced to prepare on his own. In Season 5, he becomes an investor and silent partner in Abe's Diner, after Samuel assumes ownership.

=== Peggy Biggs ===
Margaret "Peggy" Biggs (Rondi Reed) is Mike's mother. She is very controlling and traditional, as well as grumpy and cranky. Peggy frequently expects Mike to do her bidding at the drop of a hat, which made her initially cold toward Molly becoming a part of Mike's life. She has since warmed up some to Molly, and began working as a lunch lady at Molly's school in Season 2. Her tendency to lie when the truth isn't kind to her connected with that job when she told Molly she had "retired"; she'd actually been fired for being impossible to work with. Mike usually plays along with her revisionist history, but finally gets pushed too far in this case and tells Peggy she got fired because she is bitter, toxic and unlikable by anyone. She is divorced, living alone with her dog "Jim" (she even turned over Mike's old room to Jim) and often talks about her ex-husband, Jack, leaving her and running away with a "whore". Her longtime courtship of a sweet-natured and unsuccessful fellow Catholic named Dennis ended badly when she finally decided she was ready for them to have sex, only to realize he'd suffered a heart attack and died. A shocked Peggy tried to blame it on a sour lemon cake Molly had prepared for his birthday, only to have a no-longer-afraid Molly jab Peggy about her ham-fisted efforts to cover up her death-blocked seduction of Dennis. Despite her obvious disdain for Jack, the two sleep together after Mike and Molly's wedding rehearsal, but Peggy dumps him immediately after. Peggy has a gift for writing that Molly surprisingly discovered during her own successful effort to start a career as an author, and Peggy's sordid past romantic exploits become the basis for Molly's second novel. Peggy reveals that she has always felt guilty for leaving her abusive home at an early age, while her mother was stuck with a drunken batterer for a husband. She also has a sister who still lives in their hometown with whom she has feuded since their teenage years, but they eventually reconciled in Season 5. As the series ends, Peggy remained both manipulative and decent-hearted, from playing on tension between Molly and Mike when she suffers a heart attack that Mike felt Molly caused (Peggy confirmed she didn't) and nearly getting her ass kicked by Joyce when she tries to guilt Mike into moving back home. Mike assures his mother that while he wouldn't move back home then or ever, he will still make sure she's part of her grandchild's life.

=== Rosetta McMillan ===
Rosetta McMillan (Cleo King), also known as "Nana", is Carl's maternal grandmother. She apparently raised Carl since his childhood, and Carl still lives in her house. She is very traditional and has professed that Carl is a very special part of her life, but she is outwardly annoyed by his immature behavior. She has a big heart and is very friendly toward Mike, who calls her "Nana". She has been known to treat Mike as if he were also her grandson, and Mike frequently goes to Rosetta for advice about his relationship with Molly, rather than to his own mother. Despite her advancing age, she is shown to have a large sexual appetite, including an ongoing relationship with the preacher from her church. (Being only seven years older than Reno Wilson in real life, King wears a wig and makeup to appear older.) Nana is a singer; she leads the choir at church, and the presence of gold records on the wall of her house indicates she had a career as a recording artist or session vocalist.

=== Harry ===
Harry (David Anthony Higgins) attends the same Overeaters Anonymous meetings as Mike and Molly and becomes their friend. He is depicted as socially awkward and lonely, and tends to say whatever is on his mind, even thoughts that make him seem pathetic. Harry initially pursued Victoria as a love interest. The two dated once, and while it is suggested that Victoria does so out of sympathy, they attended a few other events as friends and Harry has been visibly happy to spend time with her in any capacity. In Season 3, after he finally receives a kiss from her, he announces that he's gay (to everyone's surprise except Joyce and Carl). Vince tends to speak for the group in one sense by constantly making fun of Harry and wondering why he's invited to any of their events, while Mike responds by saying they all basically like Harry even though he can be incredibly annoying. As revealed in "Gone Cheatin", he still lives with his mother.

== Recurring characters ==
=== Christina ===
Christina (Holly Robinson Peete) is Carl's girlfriend, beginning in Season 2. She is a single mother with a young son, and works as an optometrist. When Carl runs away from her after learning about her kid, she lets Carl know that he's a coward and loser who isn't worth her time. However, she accepts his later explanation about never knowing his father, and they become a committed couple. She later becomes Molly's friend. As of Season 3, she has decided to try and reconcile with her ex-husband for the sake of their son, and breaks things off with Carl. After Christina makes several negative remarks about Carl during a conversation with Molly, Molly drops her as a friend.

=== Brother Heywood ===
Brother Heywood (Reginald VelJohnson) is the preacher at Carl and Rosetta's church. It is strongly hinted (and later openly revealed) that he and Rosetta are in a sexual relationship. He officiated at Mike and Molly's wedding, after Molly was too honest with the priest at Mike's Catholic church and the two were forced to look elsewhere.

In a twist of irony, Reginald VelJohnson had previously played Carl Winslow, a cop on another Chicago-set series, Family Matters.

=== Jack Biggs ===
Jack Biggs (Francis Guinan) is Mike's father, who left Mike and his mother many years ago to run off with a woman whom Peggy simply refers to as "the whore." He first appears at Mike's bachelor party in Season 2 and tearfully apologizes to his son for running away, to which Mike honestly tells his father he loves him and is glad he will be at the wedding. After Peggy and he sleep together, he decides he wants to reconcile with her (his marriage to "the whore" is rapidly disintegrating) but Peggy bluntly says she only used him for sex and has zero interest in him now that he's served his purpose.

=== Captain Murphy ===
Captain Patrick Murphy (Gerald McRaney) is Mike's boss on the Chicago Police force. Early in Season 3, he offers Mike courtside seats at a basketball game in exchange for Mike setting him up with Peggy. Soon after, Captain Murphy and Peggy begin dating. Peggy refers to him as "Paddy", though Mike doesn't dare call him that. By the end of season 3, Peggy breaks up with Captain Murphy when he announces he's retiring and wants to move to Arizona.
