= Chuck Lorre Productions =

American television production company

- Type: Private
- Industry: Television production
- Founded: 1990s; 35 years ago January 10, 2000; 26 years ago (incorporated) in Los Angeles, California, U.S.
- Founder: Chuck Lorre
- Headquarters: Warner Bros. Studios, Burbank, California, United States
- Key people: Chuck Lorre (CEO)
- Products: Dharma & Greg; Two and a Half Men; The Big Bang Theory; Mike & Molly; Mom; Young Sheldon
- Owner: Chuck Lorre
- Website: chucklorre.com

Chuck Lorre Productions is an American television production company founded in the 1990s and incorporated on January 10, 2000 by producer Chuck Lorre.

It’s best known for producing many television series, such as Cybill (1995–98), Dharma & Greg (1997–2002), Two and a Half Men (2003–15), The Big Bang Theory (2007–19), Mike & Molly (2010–16), Mom (2013–2021), Young Sheldon (2017–2024), Bob Hearts Abishola (2019–2024), B Positive (2020–22), United States of Al (2021–22), Georgie & Mandy's First Marriage (2024–) and Leanne (2025–).

== History ==
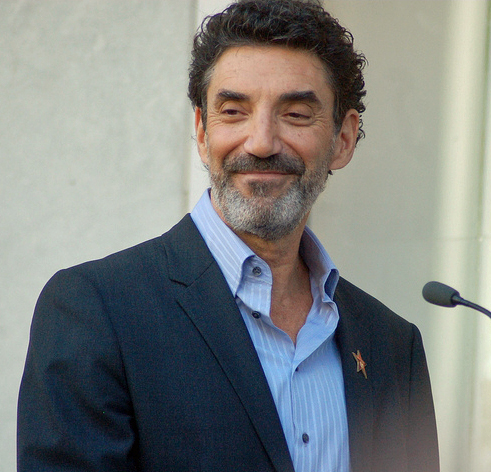
The company's founder Chuck Lorre in 2011.

The company was founded in the 1990s, and incorporated on January 10, 2000, in Los Angeles, California, by American television director, writer, producer, composer, and actor Chuck Lorre. It is headquartered at Warner Bros. Studios in Burbank, California.

In March 1994, the company entered an exclusive overall deal with The Carsey-Werner Company. Lorre began his affiliation with Carsey-Werner in 1990 as supervising producer on Roseanne. In October 1995, the company entered a four-year overall deal with 20th Century Fox Television, for an estimated US$12 million.

In September 1999, the company entered a four-year production pact with Warner Bros. Television, for an estimated US$8 million a year. The company's move to Warner Bros. Television was in relation to the former 20th Century Fox Television president, Peter Roth, who became the president of Warner Bros. Television in March 1999, bringing Lorre to Warner Bros. Television.

In August 2012, the company entered a four-year overall development and production deal with Warner Bros. Television.

== Television series ==
Years active	Title	Creator(s)	Network	Notes	Ref.
1995–98	Cybill	Chuck Lorre	CBS	First show produced by the company. Co-production with YBYL Productions and Carsey-Werner Productions.	
1997–2002	Dharma & Greg	Chuck Lorre; Dottie Dartland	ABC	Co-production with More-Medavoy Productions, 4 to 6 Foot Productions, and 20th Century Fox Television	
2003–15	Two and a Half Men	Chuck Lorre; Lee Aronsohn	CBS	Co-production with The Tannenbaum Company and Warner Bros. Television	
2007–19	The Big Bang Theory	Chuck Lorre; Bill Prady	CBS	Co-production with Warner Bros. Television	
2010–16	Mike & Molly	Mark Roberts	CBS	Co-production with Bonanza Productions and Warner Bros. Television	
2013–21	Mom	Chuck Lorre; Eddie Gorodetsky; Gemma Baker	CBS	Co-production with Warner Bros. Television	
2017–18	Disjointed	Chuck Lorre; David Javerbaum	Netflix	Co-production with Warner Bros. Television	
2017–24	Young Sheldon	Chuck Lorre; Steven Molaro	CBS	Co-production with Warner Bros. Television	
2018–21	The Kominsky Method	Chuck Lorre	Netflix	Co-production with Warner Bros. Television	
2019–24	Bob Hearts Abishola	Chuck Lorre; Eddie Gorodetsky; Al Higgins; Gina Yashere	CBS	Co-production with Warner Bros. Television	
2020–22	B Positive	Marco Pennette	CBS	Co-production with Warner Bros. Television	
2021–22	United States of Al	David Goetsch; Maria Ferrari	CBS	Co-production with Warner Bros. Television	
2023–25	Bookie	Chuck Lorre; Nick Bakay	Max	Co-production with Warner Bros. Television	
2024–present	Georgie & Mandy's First Marriage	Chuck Lorre; Steven Molaro; Steve Holland	CBS	Co-production with Warner Bros. Television	
2025–present	Leanne	Chuck Lorre; Susan McMartin; Leanne Morgan	Netflix	Co-production with Warner Bros. Television	
2026–present	Stuart Fails to Save the Universe	Chuck Lorre; Zak Penn; Bill Prady	HBO Max	Co-production with Warner Bros. Television	
