= Mark Roberts (TV producer) =

American writer and television producer (born 1961)

Mark Roberts (born January 19, 1961) is an American screenwriter, producer, playwright, actor, and comedian, best known for creating the American sitcom Mike & Molly.

== Career ==
He appeared on The Tonight Show seven times as a stand-up comic between the years of 1992–1995, which led to guest starring roles on numerous television series and films, among them Seinfeld, Friends, The Practice, The Larry Sanders Show, Two and a Half Men, and Bulletproof.

He was also a series regular on the television comedy The Naked Truth.

His plays Where the Great Ones Run, Parasite Drag, and Rantoul and Die have been published by Dramatists Play Service and produced in various theaters in the United States.

He was the creator and executive producer of Mike & Molly, which premiered September 20, 2010 on CBS, until he left the show after season 3. Mike & Molly was the highest-rated new comedy of the 2010 season.
