= Nyambi Nyambi =

American actor (born 1979)

- Born: April 26, 1979 (age 47); Norman, Oklahoma, U.S.
- Education: Bucknell University (BA); New York University (MFA); University of Oklahoma
- Occupation: Actor
- Years active: 2006–present

Nyambi Nyambi (born April 26, 1979) is an American actor. His most prominent role has been Samuel in the CBS sitcom Mike & Molly. He has played investigator Jay DiPersia in the Paramount+ legal drama The Good Fight from 2017 to 2022.

== Early life and education ==
Nyambi was born in Norman, Oklahoma, to Nigerian parents on April 26, 1979. He attended Oakton High School in Fairfax County, Virginia.

He attended Bucknell University in Lewisburg, Pennsylvania, where he played Division I college basketball.

After graduating, he earned his Master of Fine Arts in acting at New York University in New York City. In 2012, he began working toward a second master's degree, via an online program in administrative leadership at the University of Oklahoma.

== Career ==
Nyambi took up acting in his senior year at Bucknell, and decided to attend NYU (rather than Yale, where he had also been admitted for graduate school) to pursue his acting interest. He also attended the Stella Adler Studio of Acting in New York City.

He had a bit part in the independent film Day Night Day Night as Organizer. He appeared in the episode "Four Cops Shot" in the final season of the original run of Law & Order and in the independent film William Vincent alongside James Franco and Josh Lucas.

Among his stage roles have been Caliban in a 2008 Classic Stage Company production of The Tempest and Alfred in a 2009 production of Athol Fugard's Coming Home at The Wilma Theater in Philadelphia.

His big break came when he was cast in the sitcom Mike & Molly as Samuel, a Senegalese waiter who works at Mike and Carl's favorite restaurant.

In 2017, Nyambi joined The Good Fight in a recurring role as a law firm investigator. For the second season, he was promoted to regular cast member.

in 2018, he voiced J'onn J'onzz/Martian Manhunter in the animated films The Death of Superman and Reign of the Supermen, as well as John Stewart in Lego DC Super-Villains. He also appeared in the 2018 American comedy-drama Blindspotting.

On January 18, 2024, it was reported that Nyambi was promoted to a series regular on Night Court.

== Filmography ==
=== Film ===
| Year | Title | Role | Notes |
|---|---|---|---|
| 2010 | Shadows and Lies | Employer | Uncredited |
| 2018 | Blindspotting | Yorkie | |
| 2018 | The Death of Superman | Martian Manhunter | Voice, direct-to-video |
| 2019 | Reign of the Supermen | Martian Manhunter | Voice, direct-to-video |
| 2021 | Here Today | Dwayne St. Johnson | |
| 2022 | In Her Name | Judah | |
| TBA | One Attempt Remaining † | TBA | Filming |

=== Television ===
| Year | Title | Role | Notes |
|---|---|---|---|
| 2010 | Law & Order | Jackson Early | 1 episode |
| 2010–2016 | Mike & Molly | Samuel | Main role, 118 episodes |
| 2017 | Mercy Street | Caleb | 1 episode |
| 2017–2022 | The Good Fight | Jay DiPersia | Recurring role, 51 episodes |
| 2017 | Teenage Mutant Ninja Turtles | Verminator Rex, Ravagers | Voice role, 3 episodes |
| 2018–2020 | Blindspot | Dolan | 2 episodes |
| 2020–2023 | Nature | Narrator | Voice role, 6 episodes |
| 2022–2023 | Titans | Freedom Beast | 2 episodes |
| 2024-2025 | Night Court | Wyatt Shaw | Main role, 24 episodes |

=== Video games ===
| Year | Title | Role | Notes |
|---|---|---|---|
| 2015 | Call of Duty: Black Ops III | Additional voices | |
| 2018 | Lego DC Super-Villains | John Stewart | |
