= Katy Mixon =

American actress and model

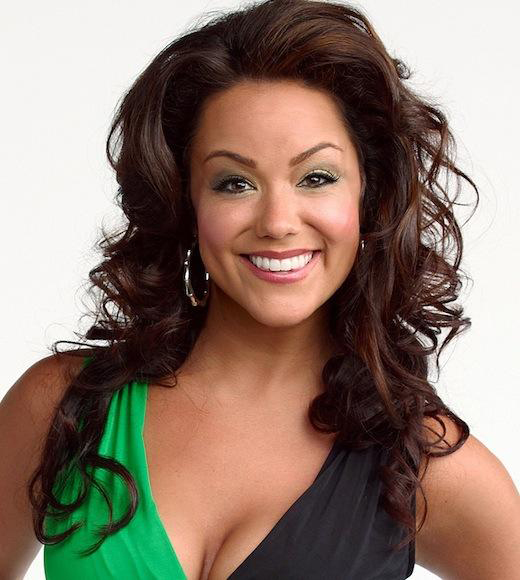
- Mixon in 2010
- Born: March 30, 1981 (age 45); Pensacola, Florida, U.S.
- Education: Carnegie Mellon University (BFA)
- Occupations: Actress; model
- Years active: 2001–present
- Spouse: Breaux Greer
- Children: 2
- Modeling information
- Hair color: Brown
- Eye color: Brown

Katy Mixon (born March 30, 1981) is an American actress and model. She began her career playing supporting roles in films such as The Quiet (2005), Four Christmases (2008), and State of Play (2009), before landing the female leading role in the HBO comedy series Eastbound & Down (2009–2013).

From 2010 to 2016, Mixon starred as Victoria Flynn, sister to Melissa McCarthy's character, on the CBS sitcom Mike & Molly. She had dramatic parts in films Take Shelter (2011), Drive Angry (2011), and Hell or High Water (2016), and did voice-over work in television with The Looney Tunes Show (2011–2013) and Big Hero 6: The Series (2018–2019), and in film with Minions (2015). From 2016 to 2021, Mixon starred as Katie Otto, the lead character in the ABC sitcom American Housewife.

== Early life ==
Mixon was born and raised in Pensacola, Florida; she is one of seven siblings. She attended the Alabama School of Fine Arts in Birmingham, Alabama, and graduated from the Pensacola School of Liberal Arts. She received her Bachelor of Fine Arts degree from the Carnegie Mellon School of Drama.

== Career ==
Mixon's first acting job came in 2001, playing Calpurnia in the Utah Shakespeare Festival's production of Julius Caesar. Mixon moved to Los Angeles in 2003. In 2005, she starred in the premiere of the interactive theater play American Standard at the Los Angeles Edgefest. Mixon has performed at Upright Cabaret.

Mixon made her motion picture debut in the 2005 thriller film The Quiet starring Elisha Cuthbert, playing the character Michelle Fell. The next year she appeared in the romantic comedy Blind Dating playing a secondary role. Mixon had a larger role in the 2008 comedy film Four Christmases. In 2009, she had roles in three films: crime drama The Informers, political thriller State of Play, and a Razzie-winning comedy All About Steve. From 2009 until 2013, she starred as April Buchanon in the HBO sports comedy series Eastbound & Down opposite Danny McBride.

In 2010, Mixon was cast as Victoria Flynn in the CBS comedy series Mike & Molly opposite Melissa McCarthy and Swoosie Kurtz. Vanity Fair described her role as "the funniest part" of the sitcom. The series ended in 2016 after six seasons and 127 episodes. During her time on Mike & Molly, Mixon co-starred alongside Jessica Chastain and Michael Shannon in the critically acclaimed independent drama film Take Shelter which was released in 2011. She had a role in the action film Drive Angry (2011) which starred Nicolas Cage; she also voiced Tina Nelson in Minions (2015). In 2016, she appeared alongside Jeff Bridges and Chris Pine in the critically acclaimed crime film Hell or High Water.

In 2016, Mixon was cast in the first leading role of her career on the ABC comedy series American Housewife created by Sarah Dunn. Mixon received positive reviews from critics for her performance as Katie Otto. She was included in People's "One to Watch" list. The series was canceled in 2021 after 103 episodes. In 2022, Mixon played Betsy Faria in the NBC miniseries The Thing About Pam detailing the involvement of Pam Hupp in the 2011 murder of Betsy Faria. Later that year, she was cast opposite Jessica Chastain in the Showtime musical drama miniseries George & Tammy.

In 2026, Mixon voiced a character in the revival of King of the Hill. She is also set to guest-star in season six of Abbott Elementary.

== Personal life ==
Mixon is married to former track and field athlete Breaux Greer. They had a son in May 2017 and a daughter in May 2018.

== Filmography ==
=== Film ===
Year	Film	Role	Notes
2005	The Quiet	Michelle Fell	
2006	Zombie Prom	Coco	Short film
2006	Blind Dating	Suzie	
2008	Finding Amanda	Girl No. 1 with Greg	
2008	Four Christmases	Susan	
2009	The Informers	Patty	
2009	State of Play	Rhonda Silver	
2009	All About Steve	Elizabeth	
2011	Take Shelter	Nat	
2011	Drive Angry	Norma Jean	
2012	A Little Something on the Side	Sofia	Short film
2015	Soul Ties	Grace	
2015	Minions	Tina Nelson (voice)	
2016	Hell or High Water	Jenny Ann	
2024	Hot Frosty	Dottie	

=== Television ===
Year	Title	Role	Notes
2004	Then Comes Marriage	Audrey	Unsold pilot
2007	Reinventing the Wheelers	Caroline Honeybaker	Unsold pilot
2008	My Name Is Earl	Sheila	Episode: "Sweet Johnny"
2009–2010	Two and a Half Men	Betsy	3 episodes
2009–2013	Eastbound & Down	April Buchanon	Main role (season 1, 4); recurring (season 2–3)
2010–2016	Mike & Molly	Victoria Flynn	127 episodes
2011	Wilfred	Angelique	Episode: "Doubt"
2011	Robot Chicken	Mary Jane Watson (voice)	Episode: "Major League of Extraordinary Gentlemen"
2013	Psych	Ursula Gibbs	Episode: "Cirque du Soul"
2013	The Looney Tunes Show	Petunia Pig (voice)	Episode: "Mr. Weiner"
2016–2021	American Housewife	Katie Otto	103 episodes
2016	Neo Yokio	Sailor Pellegrino (voice)	Episode: "A Pop Star of Infinite Elegance"
2017	Future-Worm!	Additional Voices	1 episode
2018–2019	Big Hero 6: The Series	Barb (voice)	3 episodes
2018	Rapunzel's Tangled Adventure	Seraphina (voice)	Episode: "There's Something About Hook Foot"
2022	The Thing About Pam	Betsy Faria	5 episodes
2022–2023	George & Tammy	Jan Smith	3 episodes
2026	King of the Hill	Wanda	Episode: "Hank Ruffles Some Feathers"
2026	Abbott Elementary	Elsa Hardaway	Episode: "Jungle Classroom"
