= David Anthony Higgins =

American actor (b. 1961)

- Born: December 9, 1961 (age 64); Des Moines, Iowa, U.S.
- Occupations: Actor; writer; producer
- Years active: 1987–present
- Spouse: Julia Higgins (m. 2000)
- Children: 2
- Relatives: Steve Higgins (brother); Alan J. Higgins (brother); John Higgins (nephew); Matt Mulford (cousin)

David Anthony Higgins (born December 9, 1961) is an American actor. He is known for his television roles as Craig Feldspar on Malcolm in the Middle, Joe on Ellen, and Reginald Bitters on Big Time Rush. He also had a recurring role as Harry on the television series Mike & Molly.

== Early life and education ==
Higgins was born on December 9, 1961, in Des Moines, Iowa, one of five children (including brothers Steve and Alan) of Marian Higgins (née Coppola; 1932–2011) and Harold Higgins (1934–1979), the latter of whom was a janitor at West Des Moines schools who was also a broadcaster who did high school plays. After receiving encouragement from a fourth-grade teacher, he won a scholarship to the Des Moines Playhouse and performed in several summer operettas. He was raised in Des Moines and graduated from Theodore Roosevelt High School in 1980. He attended the University of Iowa, where he studied liberal arts until he realized he wanted to pursue a career in entertainment.

== Career ==
Higgins, along with his brother Steve and Dave Gruber Allen, performed in a comedy troupe, Don't Quit Your Day Job, and performed at notable places, including Des Moines' Hotel Kirkwood. Eventually they toured in other states, including California, and were so well received that they were offered their own show, The Higgins Boys and Gruber, on HBO's The Comedy Channel in 1989. After the show ended in 1991, they each pursued separate careers in comedy.

Higgins received his big break when cast as outspoken barista Joe in the sitcom Ellen in 1994. In 1997, he appeared in the Dave Foley film The Wrong Guy, which he also co-wrote with Foley and The Simpsons writer Jay Kogen.

Higgins is perhaps most well recognized for his roles as Craig Feldspar in Malcolm in the Middle and Mr. Bitters in Big Time Rush. He also guest starred on Nickelodeon's True Jackson, VP as Dave. He later appeared in three episodes of American Horror Story: Murder House as minor character Stan. He began a recurring role as Harry in season two of the CBS series Mike & Molly, and was eventually upgraded to a series regular in season three.

== Personal life ==
In 2000, he married his wife Julia, and they have two children. They live in Studio City, California. In 2004, Higgins was featured in a Hollywood edition of the Discovery Channel series Body Challenge, where he worked with a personal trainer. He is a fan of Laurel and Hardy and Buster Keaton.

== Filmography ==
=== Film ===
Year	Title	Role	Notes
1987	Hiding Out	Student	as David Higgins
1988	Tapeheads	Visual Aplomb	as Dave Higgins
1995	Coldblooded	Lance	
1995	Payback	Jim Koval	
1996	The Moravian Massacre	William Irvine	Documentary film
1997	The Wrong Guy	Detective Arlen	Also executive producer and writer
1998	Snake Eyes	Ned Campbell	
2004	Three Blind Mice	Bruce Atkins / DMV Manager	Short film
2005	The Paperboy	Evil Project Manager #2	Short film; as David Higgins
2006	Venti Vice	Chip House	Short film; as David Higgins
2007	The Mediocre Samartan	Richard Paul Risvold	Short film
2007	When You Wish Upon a Fish	Shannon	Short film; as David Higgins
2008	The Great Buck Howard	Mark Simpson	as David Higgins
2010	Miss Nobody	Morty	
2014	State of Bacon	Bacon Dreamer	

=== Television ===
Year	Title	Role	Notes
1989–1991	The Higgins Boys and Gruber	Self	Aired on The Comedy Channel, HBO's precursor to Comedy Central
1990	After the Shock	Lieutenant Rich Allen	Television film
1994–1998	Ellen	Joe Farrell	Main role; 102 episodes
1994	Trashed	Shane Gray	1 episode
1995–1998	NewsRadio	Manager / Santa	Guest role; 3 episodes
1996	Malcolm & Eddie	Bill Fontaine	Episode: "Pilot"
1998	The Pretender	Kidnapper	Episode: "Stolen"; as Dave Higgins
1998	The Army Show	Master Sgt. Dave Hopkins	Main role; 13 episodes
1999	Judging Amy	Detective Bob Redlich	Episode: "Last Tango in Hartford"
2000–2006	Malcolm in the Middle	Craig Feldspar	Recurring role; 39 episodes
2003	My Wife and Kids	Alexander Burns	Episode: "Graduation: Part 1"
2006	Misconceptions		Recurring role; 4 episodes, as Dave Higgins
2006	Help Me Help You	Dr. Al "Big Beat" Higgins	Guest role; 2 episodes
2006	American Men	Tyler	Television film
2007	Big Day	Francis	Guest role; 2 episodes
2008	Outsourced	Ronny	Unaired pilot
2008	True Jackson, VP	Dave	Episode: "Ryan on Wheels"
2009	In the Motherhood	Iceman	Episode: "Bully"
2009–2013	Big Time Rush	Reginald Bitters	Recurring role; 41 episodes
2011–2016	Mike & Molly	Harry	Recurring role; 27 episodes
2011	The Council of Dads	Troupe Leader	Television film
2011	Last Man Standing	Bill Calhoun	Episode: "Last Halloween Standing"
2011	American Horror Story: Murder House	Stan	Guest role; 3 episodes
2012	Californication	John	Episode: "JFK to LAX"
2013	Wendell & Vinnie	Ray	Episode: "Baseball and Bad Dates"
2014–2015	International Ghost Investigators	Dave	Main role; 11 episodes, also writer and creator
2015	Comedy Bang! Bang!	Janitor	Episode: "Mark Duplass Wears a Striped Sweater and Jeans"
2017	Mom	George	Episode: "Lockjaw and a Liquid Diet"
2017	School of Rock	Gooch	Episode: "Leader of the Band"
2017	Stan Against Evil	Sheriff	Episode: "Curse of the Werepony"
2020–2022	B Positive	Jerry	Recurring role (season 1); Main role (season 2)
2023	Call Me Kat	Jeff	3 episodes
2026	Malcolm in the Middle: Life's Still Unfair	Craig Feldspar	Miniseries (2 episodes)
