= Louis Mustillo =

American actor (born 1958)

- Born: May 28, 1958 (age 68); Buffalo, New York
- Occupation: Actor
- Years active: 1989–present
- Spouse: Tricia Brown (m. 2005)

Louis Mustillo (born May 28, 1958) is an American actor who is best known as playing Vincent "Vince" Moranto on Mike & Molly from 2010 to 2016.

== Life and career ==
Mustillo was born in Buffalo, New York. He attended the American Academy of Dramatic Arts, where he was a contemporary of the Canadian actor, Elias Koteas, and Illeana Douglas. According to the American Academy's 1983 graduation program, Mustillo and Douglas graduated from the Academy's two-year program in a ceremony held at NYC's Winter Garden Theatre on April 26, 1983. They were not asked back to the school's third-year, known as The Production Company year.

He has guest-starred in more than 50 episodes of television, including an early appearance as a controversial comic on Night Court, and has appeared in over 20 films. He was a series regular on Man of the People with James Garner. He also played Russell Topps for two seasons on DreamWorks first hour-long drama, High Incident. He had a recurring role on The Sopranos as a mafia-associated landscaping business owner, Salvatore "Sal" Vitro. He appeared in The Narrows, and he played sports writer Maury Allen on the ESPN miniseries The Bronx is Burning. Louis also wrote and starred in Bartenders, a one-man show that ran for a year at the John Houseman Theatre in New York City.

He also had a regular role in the CBS sitcom Mike & Molly playing Vince, a love interest and later husband of Molly's mother.

== Personal life ==
He is married to Tricia Brown.

== Filmography ==
Year	Film/TV	Role	Notes
1989	Who's the Boss? (TV series)	Dennis	Season 6 Episode 3 "In Your Dreams"
1990	Family Matters (TV series)	Russell	Season 1 Episode 15 "The Big Reunion"
1990	Night Court (TV series)	Monte Potter	Season 8 Episode 12 "It's Just a Joke"
1991	Quantum Leap (TV series)	Mario	Season 3 Episode 14 "Private Dancer"
1992	Married... with Children (TV series)	Mr. Nielson	Season 6 Episode 22 "The Goodbye Girl"
1994	Corrina, Corrina	Joe Allechinetti	
1994	Wings (TV series)	Wise Man	Season 6 Episode 11 "Insanity Claus" (eats Bob's donut)
1995	Lois & Clark: The New Adventures of Superman (TV series)	Detective Tuzzolino	Season 2 Episode 10 "Metallo"
1996	Freeway	Vanessa's Attorney	
1996	Hellraiser: Bloodline	Sharpe	
1996-1997	High Incident (TV series)	Officer Russell Topps	32 Episodes
1997	The Peacemaker	Costello	
1998	Seinfeld (TV series)	Phil	Season 9 Episode 14 "The Strong Box"
1999	Dudley Do-Right	Standing Room Only	
1999	Just The Ticket	Harry The Head	
2000	Curb Your Enthusiasm	Guy at Counter	Season 1 Episode 2 "Ted and Mary"
2000	Early Edition (TV series)	Joey "Clams"	Season 4 Episode 14 "Performance Anxiety"
2000	ER (TV series)	Steve O’Brien	Season 6 Episode 21 “Sweet Sorrow”
2002	Wishcraft	Principal Dombrowski	
2004	CSI: Miami (TV series)	Eugene Thomas Walter	Season 2 Episode 12 "Witness To Murder"
2004-2006	The Sopranos (TV series)	Sal Vitro, The Landscaper	4 Episodes
2005	Two for the Money	Doorman	
2006	Find Me Guilty	U.S. Marshal #2	
2007	The Bronx Is Burning (TV series)	Maury Allen	
2008	My Sassy Girl	Jordan's Doorman	
2009	Cold Case (TV series)	Walt Strickland	Season 6 Episode 12 "Lotto Fever"
2010–2016	Mike & Molly (TV series)	Vince Moranto	Main Cast; 105 episodes
2012	Not Fade Away	Uncle Johnny Vitelloni	
2012	One for the Money	Frank Plum	
2015	Whole Day Down	Zabulon	Episode: "The Discreet Charm of a Wooden Bosom."
2017	Wetlands	Jimmy "Coconuts"	
2018	Strange Angel (TV series)	Humphrey	5 episodes
2018	Law & Order: Special Victims Unit (TV series)	Dave Arnold	Episode: "Revenge"
2020	NCIS (TV Series)	Emilio "Freckles" Zucado	Episode: "Everything Starts Somewhere"
2021	Blue Bloods (TV series)	Lenny	Season 11 Episode 14 "The New You"
2022	Bobcat Moretti	Carmine	
2025	The Alto Knights	Joe Bonnano	
