= Rondi Reed =

American actress (born 1952)

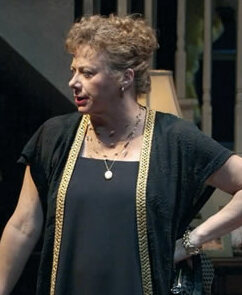
- Reed in the original Chicago cast of August: Osage County in 2007
- Born: Rondi Anne Reed; October 26, 1952 (age 73); Dixon, Illinois, U.S.
- Education: Illinois State University
- Occupation: Actress
- Years active: 1986–present
- Spouse: Stephen Eich (m. 1982; div. 2016)

Rondi Anne Reed (born October 26, 1952) is an American actress of stage and screen. A longtime member of Chicago's Steppenwolf Theatre Company, she has appeared in more than 50 productions at that theater. Also active on Broadway, she won the 2008 Tony Award for Best Performance by a Featured Actress in a Play for her portrayal of Mattie Fae Aiken in August: Osage County. She is also known for the role of Peggy on the television sitcom Mike & Molly which she played from 2010-2016.

== Early life ==
Reed was born in Dixon, Illinois. She graduated from Illinois State University in 1977. She then met a Broadway theatrical producer named Stephen Eich in 1976 during her time in Steppenwolf Theater and married him in 1982. They divorced in 2016, after being married for 34 years.

== Career ==
Reed has been a member of Chicago's Steppenwolf Theatre Company for many years, appearing in 51 productions with the company. She appeared on Broadway in The Rise and Fall of Little Voice in 1994 and The Grapes of Wrath in 1990, among others. On July 13, 2005, she originated the role of Madame Morrible in the Chicago production of the musical Wicked.

She originated the role of Mattie Fae Aiken in the Broadway production of August: Osage County in 2007, for which she won the 2008 Tony Award for Best Performance by a Featured Actress in a Play.

She later reprised her role of Madame Morrible in Wicked in Chicago, beginning June 27, 2008. Her second run ended November 18, 2008, and she was again replaced by Robertson. She then reprised her role as Mattie Fae Aiken in the London production of August: Osage Country before returning to Madame Morrible in the Broadway production of Wicked. She began performances March 17, 2009, replacing Jayne Houdyshell and bowed out as the evil headmistress on June 27, 2010, to star in the Australian production of August in Sydney. The limited engagement of the show ran from August 13 – September 25, 2010. She returned to the New York production of "Wicked" from July 31, 2017, to January 28, 2018.

She appeared in the Seinfeld episode "The Kiss Hello" (originally aired on February 16, 1995). She starred on the CBS sitcom Mike & Molly, as Peggy Biggs, Mike's mother. She also appeared on Roseanne as Jackie's therapist.

=== Film ===
Year	Title	Role	Notes
1986	One More Saturday Night	Mrs. Becker	
1992	Mo' Money	District Attorney	
1993	Born Yesterday	Victoria Penny	
1993	Joshua Tree	Detective Chelsey	Also released as Army of One and Vanishing Red, among other titles
1993	Fearless	Veronica Castane	
1996	Eye for an Eye	Regina Gratz	
1997	Jungle 2 Jungle	Sarah	
1999	The Astronaut's Wife	Dr. Conlin	
2014	Cotton	Nadine	
2015	Always Worthy	Michaela	

=== Television ===
Year	Title	Role	Notes
1992	Roseanne	Therapist	Season 4 episode 20: "Therapist"
1992	L.A. Law	Nancy Lapine	Season 6 episode 20: "Beauty and the Breast"
1992	Desperate Choices: To Save My Child	Dr. Brunell	TV movie
1993	Wild Palms	Eileen Whitehope	Miniseries; Episodes: "Everything Must Go" and "The Floating World"
1993	Murder in the Heartland	Jonette Fox	Miniseries
1995	Grace Under Fire	Irma Gold	Season 2 episode 14: "No Money Down"
1995	Seinfeld	Mary	Season 6 episode 17: "The Kiss Hello"
1995	A Streetcar Named Desire	Eunice	TV movie
1996	Innocent Victims	Bonnie Griffin	TV movie
1997	Nothing Sacred	Barbara Keneally	Episode 3: "Mixed Blessings"
1997	Night Man	Hospitalized girl's Mother	Season 1 episode 5: "Still of the Night"
1998	The Practice	Suzanne Carroll	Season 2 episode 22: "Another Day"
1998	Cybill	Therapist	Season 4 episode 16: "Fine Is Not a Feeling"
1999	Home Improvement	Dr. Miller	Season 8 episode 22: "Loose Lips and Freudian Slips"
2003	Normal	Roy's Sister Beth	TV movie
2003	Fargo	Anne Mendelson	TV movie
2008	Lipstick Jungle	Lana	Season 1 episode 4: "Chapter Four: Bombay Highway"
2010	You Don't Know Jack	Judge Cooper	TV movie
2010–2016	Mike & Molly	Peggy	62 episodes
2014	Long Way Home	Sandy "Go-Go" Rhodes	Season 1 episodes 1-4: "Del 1," "Del 2," "Del 3," "Del 4"
2015	Scandal	Mary Peterson	Season 4 episode 20: "First Lady Sings the Blues"
2016	Masters of Sex	Edith Schiff	Season 4 episodes 5, 6, 7: "Outlier," "Family Only," "In to Me You See"
2018	Disjointed	Nana	Episode 18: "A-A-R-Pot"
2018	How To Get Away With Murder	Judge Victoria Harper	Season 5 Episode 3: "The Baby Was Never Dead"
2018	Midnight, Texas	Grace Barrone	Season 2 episode 4: "I Put A Spell on You"
2019	Speechless	Nina	Season 3 episode 13: "F-a-Fashion 4 A-All"
2021	Mom	Jolene	Season 8 episode 18: "My Kinda People and the Big To-Do"
2021	Why Women Kill	Mrs. Carol Yost	3 episodes
2022	B Positive	Irene	3 episodes
2022	How We Roll	Ruth	3 episodes
2023	Fatal Attraction	Judge Webb	Season 1 Episode 7 "Best Friend"
2024	Bookie	Helen	Season 2 Episode 3 "Boom, Done, Hello Jesus"
2025	Monster: The Ed Gein Story	Mary Hogan	Season 3 Episode 2 "Sick as Your Secrets"

=== Stage ===
Year	Title	Role	Notes
1987	A Lie of the Mind	Lorraine	Steppenwolf Theatre, Chicago
1987	Aunt Dan and Lemon	Mother	Steppenwolf Theatre, Chicago
1990	The Grapes of Wrath	Mrs. Wainwright	Cort Theatre, Broadway
1991	Another Time	Leonard's Mother	Steppenwolf Theatre, Chicago
1994	The Rise and Fall of Little Voice	Mari Hoff	Neil Simon Theatre, Broadway
2007	August: Osage County	Mattie Fae Aiken	Imperial Theatre, Broadway
2010	Wicked	Madame Morrible (Replacement)	Gershwin Theatre, Broadway
2018	Henry IV	Mistress Quickly	Shakespeare Center of Los Angeles
