= Alan J. Higgins =

American television writer and producer

Al Higgins
- Born: Alan Joel Higgins; Des Moines, Iowa, U.S.
- Other names: Al Higgins; Alan Higgins
- Occupations: Writer, producer
- Years active: 1991–present
- Relatives: Steve Higgins (brother); David Anthony Higgins (brother); John Higgins (nephew)

Alan Joel Higgins (sometimes credited as Al Higgins and Alan Higgins) is an American television writer and producer.

Higgins was born in Des Moines, Iowa, and is the brother of actor David Anthony Higgins and Saturday Night Live assistant producer/The Tonight Show Starring Jimmy Fallon announcer Steve Higgins.

He was a writer and associate producer of the television series Malcolm in the Middle for the first three seasons, and came back as a creative consultant for season seven.

Higgins' other television credits include the first three seasons of NewsRadio, 'Til Death, Cracking Up, In the Motherhood, Cavemen, Doug, 100 Questions, Big Lake, Mike & Molly and Bob Hearts Abishola.

== Filmography ==
Year	Title	Credited as			Notes
Year	Title	Writer	Producer	Other	Notes
1991–94, 96	Doug	Yes	No	Yes	Wrote 19 episodes, also voiced Larry and script coordinator
1993–95	The Jon Stewart Show	Yes	No	No	
1994	Weinerville	No	No	Yes	Additional material by
1996–99	NewsRadio	Yes	Yes	Yes	Wrote 12 episodes, also executive story editor and story editor Supervising and co-producer
2000–06	Malcolm in the Middle	Yes	Yes	Yes	Co-executive producer, wrote 8 episodes Also consultant
2002	Verbal Communications	Yes	Executive	Yes	Also director
2003	Senor White	Yes	Executive	No	TV movie
2004	Cracking Up	Yes	Yes	No	Co-executive producer, wrote: "Panic House"
2005	Pool Guys	No	Executive	No	TV movie
2006	American Men	Yes	Executive	No	TV movie
2006–07	'Til Death	Yes	Yes	No	Co-executive producer, wrote 2 episodes
2007	Cavemen	Yes	Yes	No	Consulting producer, wrote: "Nick Get Job"
2009	In the Motherhood	Yes	Yes	No	Co-executive producer, wrote: "Bully"
2010	100 Questions	Yes	Yes	No	Co-executive producer, co-wrote: "Wayne?"
2010	Big Lake	Yes	Yes	Yes	Consulting producer, wrote 2 episodes Also staff writer
2010–16	Mike & Molly	Yes	Executive	No	Wrote 99 episodes, also co-executive producer
2017	Superior Donuts	No	Yes	No	Consulting producer
2018–21	The Kominsky Method	Yes	Executive	No	Wrote 7 episodes
2019–24	Bob Hearts Abishola	Yes	Executive	Yes	Co-creator, wrote 35 episodes
2026	Malcolm in the Middle: Life's Still Unfair	Yes	No	No	Co-wrote "Episode Four"

== Nominations ==
Year	Award	Category	Work	Result	Ref.
2001	Primetime Emmy Awards	Outstanding Comedy Series	Malcolm in the Middle	Nominated	
2002	OFTA Television Awards	Best Writing in a Comedy Series	Malcolm in the Middle	Nominated	
2003	Producers Guild of America Awards	Outstanding Producer of Episodic Television, Comedy	Malcolm in the Middle	Nominated	
2020	Primetime Emmy Awards	Outstanding Comedy Series	The Kominsky Method	Nominated	
2021	Primetime Emmy Awards	Outstanding Comedy Series	The Kominsky Method	Nominated	
