= Pennsylvania Lottery =

Lottery operated by the Commonwealth of Pennsylvania

Agency overview
- Formed: August 26, 1971
- Jurisdiction: Pennsylvania
- Headquarters: Lower Swatara Township, Pennsylvania (Middletown address)
- Motto: Benefits Older Pennsylvanians. Every Day.
- Agency executives: Drew Svitko, Executive Director; Jim Sawyer, Security Director; Ewa Swope, Press Secretary
- Parent agency: Pennsylvania Department of Revenue
- Website: www.palottery.pa.gov

The Pennsylvania Lottery is a lottery operated by the Commonwealth of Pennsylvania. It was created by the Pennsylvania General Assembly on August 26, 1971; from a bill sponsored by Harry Englehart. Two months later, Henry Kaplan was appointed as its first executive director. The Pennsylvania Lottery sold its first tickets on March 7, 1972, and drew its first numbers on March 15, 1972.

== Lottery proceeds ==
By Pennsylvania law, at least 40 percent of Lottery proceeds are required to be paid as prizes, with another 27 percent towards funding programs. Currently, the Pennsylvania Lottery exceeds these requirements, as 60.9 percent is paid as prizes, 29.9 percent to programs, 6.7 percent is paid as retailer and vendor commissions and 2.5 percent is consumed as operating expenses.

For the 2009–2010 fiscal year, approximately $3.065 billion in gross revenue was acquired through proceeds and interest. Approximately $1.87 billion was paid as prizes, $915.7 million to programs, $207 million was paid as retailer and vendor commissions, and $76.6 million was paid to advertising and operations. The gross revenue for fiscal year 2009–2010 represented an increase of approximately 59 percent in sales over fiscal year 2001–02.

The Pennsylvania Lottery is the only US lottery that targets all of its proceeds to programs for its elderly residents. Since the beginning of the Lottery in 1972, more than $20.1 billion has been contributed to programs.

In 2017, following a revenue decrease exceeding $75 million for the fiscal year 2016–2017, Pennsylvania passed a gaming expansion bill that authorized the sale of online lottery products. Governor Tom Wolf's budget plan for 2018 said that he and the state would use new revenues to "re-establish a $75 million reserve fund".

== Pennsylvania-only draw games ==
=== Pick 2 ===
Pick 2 is a two-digit (0–9) game which debuted on January 27, 2015. (Concurrent with the introduction of Pick 2, the Daily Number, Big 4, and Quinto were renamed to Pick 3, Pick 4, and Pick 5, respectively.) Pick 2 is drawn twice daily (at 1:10 p.m. ET, with the numbers posted on the Lottery's website after 1:35 p.m. ET, and on a live televised drawing at 6:59 p.m. ET), seven days a week. The minimum play is $1, and tickets can be purchased up to seven days in advance.

Pick 2 can be played in four basic ways:

Bet	Probability	Prize
Straight	1:100	$50
Box	1:50	$25
Front digit	1:10	$5
Back digit	1:10	$5

=== Pick 3 (formerly The Daily Number) ===
Pick 3 debuted on March 1, 1977, as The Daily Number. It is a three-digit (0–9) game, drawn twice a day (at 1:10 p.m. ET, with the numbers posted on the Lottery's website after 1:35 p.m. ET, and on a live televised drawing at 6:59 p.m. ET), seven days a week. Single tickets can be purchased in increments of 50¢, up to $5.00. Tickets can be purchased up to seven days in advance.

Pick 3 can be played in five basic ways:

Way to play	To play	To win	Payout
Straight	The player chooses any three digits.	If the three digits, and their order, match the winning number drawn, the player wins.	500 to 1
Boxed	The player chooses any three digits.	If the three digits, regardless of their order, match the winning number, the player wins.	80 to 1
Boxed	The player chooses any three digits.	The payout differs if a winning boxed number includes two of the same digit.	160 to 1
Front Pair	The player chooses any two digits.	If the two digits, and their order, match the front (left) two digits of the winning number, the player wins.	50 to 1
Back Pair	The player chooses any two digits.	If the two digits, and their order, match the back (right) two digits of the winning number, the player wins.	50 to 1
Super Straight	The player chooses any three digits.	The online system plays all six possible combinations (if all three digits are different) of the number. Consequently, tickets cost six times the normal price of a ticket. A win is, therefore, treated like a Straight win.	500 to 1
Super Straight	The player chooses any three digits.	If a Super Straight number includes two of the same digit, the cost is three times that of the regular cost, since there are only three possible winning combinations (instead of six).	500 to 1

=== Pick 4 (formerly Big 4) ===
Pick 4 debuted on November 22, 1980, as Big 4. It is a four-digit game, drawn twice a day (at 1:10 p.m. ET, with the numbers posted on the Lottery's website after 1:35 p.m. ET, and on the live televised drawing at 6:59 p.m. ET), seven days a week. Single tickets can be purchased for the same amounts as in Pick 3, up to seven days in advance.

Pick 4 can be played in two basic ways:

Way to play	To play	To win	Payout
Straight	The player chooses any four digits.	If the four digits, and their order, match the winning number drawn, the player wins.	5,000 to 1
Boxed	The player chooses any four digits.	If the four digits match (in this case four different digits), regardless of their order, match the winning number, the player wins.	200 to 1
Boxed	The player chooses any four digits.	A winning boxed number including three of the same digit (regardless of the remaining single digit).	1,200 to 1
Boxed	The player chooses any four digits.	A winning boxed number including two pairs of digits.	800 to 1
Boxed	The player chooses any four digits.	A winning boxed number including one pair of digits (regardless of the other two digits).	400 to 1

=== Pick 5 (formerly Quinto) ===
Pick 5's first drawing was on August 26, 2008, under the name Quinto. It is a five-digit game, drawn twice a day (at 1:10 p.m. ET, with the numbers posted on the Lottery's website after 1:35 p.m. ET, and on the live televised drawing at 6:59 p.m. ET), seven days a week. The minimum play in Pick 5 is $1. Players can purchase tickets up to seven days in advance.

Odds and payouts for Pick 5 are as follows:

Bet	Probability	Prize
Straight	1:100,000	$50,000
5 Way Box	1:20,000	$10,000
10 Way Box	1:10,000	$5,000
20 Way Box	1:5,000	$2,500
30 Way Box	1:3,333.3	$1,700
60 Way Box	1:1,666.7	$850
120 Way Box	1:833.3	$425
Front 4	1:10,000	$5,000
Back 4	1:10,000	$5,000
Front 3	1:1,000	$500
Back 3	1:1,000	$500
Front Pair	1:100	$50
Back Pair	1:100	$50

=== Wild Ball ===
The Wild Ball is an add-on to the Pick 2, Pick 3, Pick 4, and Pick 5 games introduced on September 13, 2016. Activating the Wild Ball doubles the cost of the play.

Before the Pick games are drawn, one digit from 0 through 9 is drawn and designated as the Wild Ball number. The Wild Ball number may then be used by the player to replace any one digit in any of the Pick games. For instance, if the player selects 123 in the Pick 3 game, and the number actually drawn is 124, but the Wild Ball is a 3, the player may replace the 4 with a 3 to create a winning combination.

Because the Wild Ball creates additional ways to win, a win using the Wild Ball generally pays a lesser amount than a win using the base play (with the exceptions of the front and back digit plays in Pick 2), however, a player can win both from the Wild Ball and from the base play if the Wild Ball matches one of the digits naturally.

Payouts using the Wild Ball are as follows:

==== Pick 2 ====
Bet	Probability	Prize
Straight	1:50	$30
Box	1:25	$15
Front digit	1:10	$6
Back digit	1:10	$6

==== Pick 3 ====
Bet	Probability	Payout
Straight	1:333.33	200 to 1
6-way Box	1:55.56	36 to 1
3-way Box	1:111.11	72 to 1
Front Pair	1:50	30 to 1
Back Pair	1:50	30 to 1

==== Pick 4 ====
Bet	Probability	Payout
Straight	1:2,500	1,500 to 1
4-way Box	1:625	390 to 1
6-way Box	1:416.67	260 to 1
12-way Box	1:208.33	130 to 1
24-way Box	1:104.17	60 to 1

==== Pick 5 ====
Bet	Probability	Prize
Straight	1:20,000	$12,000
5 Way Box	1:4,000	$2,400
10 Way Box	1:2,000	$1,200
20 Way Box	1:1,000	$600
30 Way Box	1:666.67	$400
60 Way Box	1:333.33	$200
120 Way Box	1:166.67	$100
Front 4	1:2,500	$1,500
Back 4	1:2,500	$1,500
Front 3	1:333.33	$200
Back 3	1:333.33	$200
Front Pair	1:50	$30
Back Pair	1:50	$30

=== Treasure Hunt ===
Treasure Hunt's first drawing was on May 8, 2007. It involves selecting five numbers from 1 through 30. It is drawn daily at 1:10 p.m. ET, and the results are released at 1:35 p.m. ET on the Lottery's website. It is the Lottery's only game held exclusively during the non-televised midday drawings, as well as its only game always selected via a computer instead of printed balls. The minimum jackpot is $10,000, although sales often allow the actual prize level to be higher. Prizes are also won by matching four, three, or two of the winning numbers. Treasure Hunt has a payout percentage of 58%.

Numbers matched	Probability	Payout
5 of 5	1:142,506	Jackpot
4 of 5	1:1,140.05	$100
3 of 5	1:47.5	$6
2 of 5	1:6.2	$1

Overall odds of winning are 1 in 5.45.

=== Cash 5 ===
Cash 5 consists of picking five numbers from 1 through 43 (originally 1-39). It is drawn during the live televised nighttime drawings at 6:59 p.m. ET, seven days a week. Games cost $2 each (previously $1); tickets can be purchased up to seven days in advance. The minimum jackpot is $150,000 (originally $100,000, then $125,000), increasing until there is a 5-of-5 winner. Cash 5 jackpots also are always paid in lump sum. This game began on April 23, 1992 as a weekly game. It gradually expanded in popularity.

Cash 5 has four available prize amounts:

Numbers matched	Probability	Payout
5 of 5	1:962,598.00	Jackpot, divided among all 5-of-5 winners.
4 of 5	1:5,066.30	Fixed at $200
3 of 5	1:136.90	Fixed at $10
2 of 5	1:11.40	Fixed at $2

Starting on March 23, 2021, the price per play increased to $2, and all second through fourth-level prizes became fixed amounts ($200, $10, and $2, respectively). Concurrent with this change, a “Quick Cash” feature was added, in which a second ticket, similar to a Fast Play ticket (see below) would be printed with one play of Quick Cash given for each play of Cash 5 purchased. Matching any of five “winning numbers” to any of five “your numbers” in the same play, wins the prize of either $2 or $6.

=== Match 6 ===
Match 6 consists of picking 6 numbers, from 1 through 49. It is drawn during the live televised Lottery drawings at 6:59 p.m. ET. Nightly Players get three sets of numbers for each $2 game played (see below); betters can play in increments up to 26 drawings. The jackpot begins at $500,000; it always is paid in a lump sum.

Players automatically receive two free "quick picks" for each $2 played; unlike the former game Super 6 (see below), the automatic quick-picks are necessary. This is because, in addition to winning in the normal fashion (matching at least three numbers in one game, "base play"), a player also can win by matching enough numbers on all 3 lines ("combined play"). In "combined play", the 18 numbers across the three lines often repeat. Only when there are enough "repeats" across the three lines is it possible to win the highest possible prize in the "all three lines category" (see list of prize amounts).

Match 6 has 11 available prize amounts:

Numbers matched	Probability	Payout
6 of 6	1:4,661,272.3	Jackpot amount
5 of 6	1:18,067.3	$1,000
4 of 6	1:344.5	$20
3 of 6	1:19.2	$2
10+ of 18	1:597,302.6	$2,500
9 of 18	1:45,267.4	$1,000
8 of 18	1:4,440.4	$50
7 of 18	1:590.9	$25
6 of 18	1:106.7	$10
5 of 18	1:26.4	$5
4 of 18	1:9.1	$2

The overall probability of winning on a $2 play is approximately 1 in 5.9.

Match 6 originally ran from January 28, 2004, to March 10, 2009. The final jackpot of this run was $900,000, and was won by one set of six numbers. The jackpot would have rolled down if there had been no winner. Match 6 was replaced by the revival of Super 7, which in turn was retired on April 27, 2010, due to poor sales.

On June 1, 2010, however, Match 6 returned, this time replacing Mix & Match. Match 6's gameplay did not change from the previous version, although the drawing days are different from before. It was formerly drawn on Mondays and Thursdays, and also formerly Tuesdays and Fridays. It also has an average payout of 57.95%, up from 53% in the previous version. This extra money goes into the jackpot, as the lower tier prize amounts did not change.

On August 28, 2017, Match 6 increased the frequency of drawings to seven nights per week. This made Pennsylvania one of the few lotteries to have all of its draw games held daily.

=== Keno ===
Pennsylvania Governor Tom Wolf signed a gaming expansion bill on October 30, 2017, making it possible for the lottery to offer Keno.

Keno games went live on May 1, 2018, at hundreds of locations throughout the state.

=== iLottery ===
In May 2018, the Pennsylvania Lottery launched internet lottery games. The suite of products, known as the Pennsylvania iLottery, includes a variety of scratch-off games that reveal lottery ticket results online.

In August 2018, seven Pennsylvania casinos filed a lawsuit to shut the iLottery program down, citing similarities to slot machines which casinos have exclusive rights to offering in the state. The lottery has continued to offer these games, as this style of scratch-off tickets are considered sufficiently different from online casino slot machines in other jurisdictions with similar products.

=== Xpress Sports ===
The Pennsylvania Lottery has been offering Xpress Sports' Racing and Football since the summer of 2018. Similar to keno, the virtual sports games are displayed on monitors at select locations and run every few minutes.

=== Derby Cash ===
On November 19, 2019, the Pennsylvania Lottery began offering Derby Cash, a virtual horse racing game. The virtual races run every 5 minutes and can be bought at all lottery retailers and watched at over 2,000 locations.

== Multi-state games offered in Pennsylvania ==
=== Cash4Life ===
Pennsylvania joined Cash4Life on April 7, 2015; it began in New Jersey and New York the previous year. (The game also is available in Florida, Georgia, Indiana, Maryland, Missouri, Tennessee, and Virginia.)

Players choose 5 of 60 numbers in one field, and 1 of 4 green "Cash Ball" numbers in the second field. Cash4Life drawings are held live on Monday to Sunday evenings at 9pm Eastern Time on Livestream. The top prize (win or share) $1,000-per-day-for-life, or the cash option. Second prize is $1,000-per-week-for-life or the cash option.

=== Mega Millions ===
Mega Millions was originally known as The Big Game, which began in 1996. The current name was adopted in 2002. On October 13, 2009, an agreement was reached between the Mega Millions and Powerball groups. On January 31, 2010, Pennsylvania was among the lotteries that added the "other" game, in this case Mega Millions, on the cross-sell expansion date. Forty-six lotteries, including those of the District of Columbia and the U.S. Virgin Islands, currently offer both games. Prior to the expansion, bordering states including New Jersey, New York, and Ohio offered Mega Millions, with many Pennsylvania residents driving to those states whenever the jackpot was high.

The current Mega Millions game requires players to choose 5 of 70 "white ball" numbers, and a gold-colored "Mega Ball" from a pool of 25 numbers. Plays remain $2 each, or $3 if the Megaplier is activated. Mega Millions is drawn Tuesday and Friday nights.

The first Mega Millions drawing that included Pennsylvania (held on February 2, 2010) produced three winners of $250,000; two were in areas new to the game: one each in Connecticut and Pennsylvania. Neither ticket holder had activated the Megaplier, which would have won $1,000,000, as the Megaplier was 4. Eventually, a second-prize Mega Millions ticket with Megaplier activated was guaranteed to win $1,000,000, regardless of the multiplier drawn.

=== Powerball ===
Pennsylvania joined Powerball in 2002; it was MUSL's most-populous member until Florida joined in 2009. Prior to joining Powerball, Delaware and West Virginia were the closest states to offer Powerball, with many residents in the western portion of the state in particular driving to the Northern Panhandle of West Virginia to buy tickets in droves whenever the jackpot was high.

The current Powerball game requires players to choose 5 of 69 "white ball" numbers, and a red-colored "Powerball" from a pool of 26 numbers. Plays are $2 each, or $3 if Power Play is activated. Powerball is drawn Monday, Wednesday, and Saturday nights.

== Recurring games ==
=== Millionaire Raffle ===
The Millionaire Raffle is normally offered annually. Tickets cost $20; each ticket is assigned a unique eight-digit number starting from 00000001 (quantities being limited). Numbers are assigned in the order that the tickets are purchased; thus, the 100,000th ticket purchased for a given raffle will have the number 00100000. At the drawings, the four $1,000,000-winning ticket numbers, as well as the second prize winners, are drawn by random number generator. As of January 2024, there have been 33 Millionaire Raffle drawings.

== Retired Draw Games ==
The Pennsylvania Lottery has offered several games which would later be discontinued due to low sales and/or relative obsolescence.

These games include (in order of introduction):

=== (Wild Card) Lotto ===
Lotto was the third game and the first jackpot game offered by the Pennsylvania Lottery, and replaced the traditional "passive draw" games. The first version ran from April 1982 until February 1988. The game was played by selecting 6 numbers from a field of 40. Players got two games for $1, having to play an even number of games. Players won the jackpot, which was paid in 21 annual installments (with no cash option), by matching the first six numbers drawn. Players won by matching at least four of the first six numbers drawn. Players also would win by matching 5 of the first 6, plus a seventh, "alternate", number if no game matched the first six numbers.

The prize structure with one or more jackpot winners was as follows:

Matches	Prize Category	Avg. Prize	% of Sales	Odds (per $1)
6 of 6	Regular First Prize	Jackpot	24.5%	1:1,919,190
5 of 6 + Alternate	Alternate First Prize*	$0	0%	1:319,865
5 of 6	Second Prize	$921.50	9.80%	1:9,407.79
4 of 6	Third Prize	$33.50	14.70%	1:228.07
*Alternate 1st Prize available if there were no jackpot winner(s)				Overall odds of winning: 1 in 222.644

The prize structure with no jackpot winner was as follows:

Matches	Prize Category	Avg. Prize	% of Sales	Odds (per $1)
6 of 6	Regular First Prize	Jackpot	19.6% (carried over to next draw)	1:1,919,190
5 of 6 + Alternate	Alternate First Prize*	$15,673.00	4.9%	1:319,865
5 of 6	Second Prize	$921.50	9.80%	1:9,407.79
4 of 6	Third Prize	$33.50	14.70%	1:228.07
*Alternate 1st Prize available if there were no jackpot winners				Overall odds of winning: 1 in 222.644

In February 1988, the game became Wild Card Lotto (WCL). The game's changes included the addition of two prize categories and a "permanent" prize for matching 5 of the first 6 numbers drawn along with the "alternate" number (now called the "Wild Card Number").

The new game was played by selecting 6 numbers from 48. Players continued to get two plays for $1, again having to purchase games in pairs. Drawings were now Tuesdays and Fridays. Prizes were won by matching at least four numbers, with or without the "Wild Card" number. The jackpot continued to be paid in 21 annual payments with no cash option.

The first WCL prize structure:

Matches	Avg. Prize	% of Sales	Odds ($1 purchase)
6 of 6	Jackpot	29.4%	1:6,135,756
5 of 6 + Wild Card	$25,054.00	2.45%	1:1,022,626
5 of 6	$1,099.50	4.41%	1:24,942.10
4 of 6 + Wild Card	$488.50	4.90%	1:9,976.84
4 of 6	$24.00	4.90%	1:498.84
3 of 6 + Wild Card	$11.00	2.94%	1:374.13
Overall odds of winning: 1 in 207.5135

On October 31, 1995, the Friday drawing was dropped, only to be reinstated on March 12, 1996. On March 26, 1996, Pennsylvania's first cash option was introduced; WCL players were now required when purchasing tickets (instead of after winning, as in present-day Cash4Life, Mega Millions, or Powerball) to choose between receiving a jackpot prize in the 21-payment annuity or in a lump sum.

On February 24, 1998, the game went through a final overhaul. A seventh prize category was added, a $1 prize for matching 3 of the first 6 numbers. The percentage of sales allocated to the jackpot also increased. The remaining prize categories were decreased as a result.

Matches	Avg. Prize	% of 49% Prize Pool	Odds (per $1)
6 of 6	Jackpot	74.17% After Deduction of 3-of-6 Prize	1:6,135,756
5 of 6 + Wild Card	$20,041.50	4.305% After Deduction of 3-of-6 Prize	1:1,022,626
5 of 6	$488.50	4.305% After Deduction of 3-of-6 Prize	1:24,942.10
4 of 6 + Wild Card	$195.50	4.305% After Deduction of 3-of-6 Prize	1:9,976.84
4 of 6	$19.50	8.61% After Deduction of 3-of-6 Prize	1:498.84
3 of 6 + Wild Card	$7.00	4.305% After Deduction of 3-of-6 Prize	1:374.13
3 of 6	$1.00 (Fixed)		1:28.78
Overall odds: 1 in 25.274

The game held its last drawing on September 4, 1998. The game, along with Keystone Jackpot, was replaced with Super 6 Lotto (see below for both games).

=== Super 7 (1986–1995) ===
Super 7, a jackpot game similar to keno, was originally introduced on August 14, 1986. The first draw was on August 20, 1986.

The original Super 7 was played by selecting 7 of 80 numbers. Jackpots started at $2 million and increased in increments of $1,000,000 until it was won; each game cost $1. On Wednesday nights, the Lottery drew 11 numbers. If a player matched 7 of the 11 drawn, they won a jackpot that was paid in 26 installments; unlike the 2009-2010 revival of Super 7, there was no cash option. All prizes were parimutuel. The original Super 7's odds were as follows:

Matches on Ticket	Avg. Prize	% of 49% Prize Pool	Odds
7 of 7	Jackpot	70% after deduction of 4-of-7 prize	1: 9,626,413.3
6 of 7	$4,503.00	10% after deduction of 4-of-7 prize	1: 99,652.3
5 of 7	$264.50	20% after deduction of 4-of-7 prize	1: 2,930.9
4 of 7	$7.00 (fixed)		1: 183.7
Overall odds of winning: 1 in 172.591†

†The overall odds when the game first began was 1 in 2,846.367 as the first few drawings did not have a 4/7 prize.

On April 10, 1991, the game's format was changed, with 10 numbers drawn instead of 11 and 74 numbers to choose from instead of 80. Players still selected 7 numbers for each game.

The prize structure from April 10, 1991, to game's end was as follows:

Matches on Ticket	Avg. Prize	% of 49% Prize Pool	Odds
7 of 7	Jackpot	70%	1: 14,996,492.2
6 of 7	$2,479.00	25% after deduction of jackpot & 4-of-7 prize	1: 133,897.3
5 of 7	$196.50	75% after deduction of jackpot & 4-of-7 prize	1: 3,542.3
4 of 7	$15.00 (fixed)		1: 205.7
Overall odds of winning: 1 in 194.108

On July 10, 1993, drawings were moved from Wednesdays to Saturdays.

The Lottery held the last drawing of the original Super 7 on October 28, 1995. This game was replaced by Keystone Jackpot (see below for information on that game)

=== Saturday/Million Dollar Spin (1987–1998) ===
The original Saturday Spin was weekly beginning on March 7, 1987. Each week, five players who had won a "free ticket" prize had their names on a special wheel, the player whose name the wheel stopped on would win $50,000 or $100,000 in cash, or a $1 million annuity. The other 4 finalists left the weekly drawing empty handed.

On May 5, 1990, Saturday Spin was changed to Million Dollar Spin. In the second version of the game, 10 players who had won a "free ticket" prize were selected for the weekly drawing and a second wheel selected a prize of $50,000, $75,000, or $100,000 cash or a $1,000,000 annuity. Each of the other nine finalists received $5,000.

Million Dollar Spin was played until December 26, 1998. On the final drawing, all prize values were doubled.

=== Hearts & Diamonds ===
Hearts & Diamonds began on October 5, 1994.

The game involved selecting 5 of 26 playing cards (from the hearts and diamonds suits only; hence the name). This is the only Pennsylvania Lottery game to date (including raffles) where all ticket selections were by "quick-pick". The game was also Pennsylvania's first to be drawn by random number generator (computer) as opposed to mechanical ball machine(s); this method would later be employed, to draw Midday games.

The prize structure was:

Matches	Avg. Prize	% of Sales	Odds
5 of 5	$20,062.50	30.5%	1:65,780
4 of 5	$72.00	11.5%	1:626.5
3 of 5	$2.50	8.0%	1:31.3
Overall odds: 1 in 29.819

Hearts & Diamonds ended on March 10, 1996.

=== Keystone Jackpot ===
Keystone Jackpot began on October 29, 1995, replacing the original Super 7. Keystone Jackpot was the first single-state game in the U.S. to draw from two number pools; it also is the only U.S. game to date using two number pools drawing a total of seven numbers.

Keystone Jackpot was played by selecting 6 of 33 numbers in the first pool, and a seventh, blue, Key Ball from another field of 33. To win, players needed to match 4 or more white ball numbers drawn with or without the key ball number or, as in Mega Millions or Powerball, automatically winning by matching the Key Ball with 3, 2, 1 or 0 white balls drawn. Jackpots were paid in 26 installments; there was never a cash option (although Pennsylvania's first cash option began during Keystone Jackpot's run). Games cost $1 each.

The prize structure went as follows:

Matches	Avg. Prize	% of Sales	Odds
6 + Key Ball	Jackpot	29.3412%	1:36,549,744
6	$77,793.50	6.811%	1:1,142,179.5
5 + Key Ball	$7,771.50	3.4447%	1:225,615.7
5	$77.00	1.0927%	1:7,050.5
4 + Key Ball	$77.00	1.1074%	1:6,942.0
4	$7.00	3.2291%	1:216.9
3 + Key Ball	$7.00	1.1221%	1:624.8
2 + Key Ball	$1.00	1.47%	1:138.8
1 + Key Ball	$1.00	2.7%	1:75.5
Key Ball only	$1.00	1.65%	1:123.5
Overall odds: 1 in 28.526

Keystone Jackpot underwent no changes during its history; its final drawing was held September 5, 1998, being replaced by Super 6.

=== Super 6 ===
Super 6 began on September 5, 1998, replacing Wild Card Lotto and Keystone Jackpot.

Super 6 was one of the first jackpot games in North America where players received automatic "Quick Picks", instead of being allowed to choose all of their numbers. Players selected 6 numbers from 1 through 69 in each game panel, receiving two "free plays" of automatic Quick-Picks, for a total of 3 plays for $1. Matching all 6 numbers in a game, won a jackpot, paid either in 26 installments or, if selected when playing, in a lump sum. Players won by matching at least 3 numbers in a game panel.

The prize pool was arranged as follows:

Matches	Avg. Prize	% of Sales	Odds ($1 play)
6 of 6	Jackpot	39.52%	1:39,959,157.33
5 of 6	$4,397.50	4.16%	1:105,712.06
4 of 6	$53.00	3.90%	1:1,364.03
3 of 6	$2.00	4.42%	1:50.31
Overall odds: 1 in 48.5

Overall odds: 1 in 48.5

Its drawings were initially held on Wednesdays and Saturdays, later moving to Tuesdays and Fridays shortly after Pennsylvania joined the multi state Powerball game in 2002.

Super 6's final drawing was on January 27, 2004. It was replaced by the current game, Match 6 Lotto.

=== Lucky for Life ===
Lucky for Life (the PA lottery version) began on September 28, 2004; its first drawing was held on September 30.

Lucky for Life was played by picking 6 of 38 numbers; each game cost $2. Players won by matching 3 or more numbers, and/or the game's "instant win" feature. Matching all 6 numbers won an annuity prize of $3,000 per month, with a $1 million guarantee. There was no cash option, which may have led to the game being retired within three years.

The prize structure was as follows:

Matches	Prize	Odds
6 of 6	$3,000/month	1:2,760,681
5 of 6	$2,000	1:14,378.5
4 of 6	$40	1:371.1
3 of 6	$3	1:27.8
Overall odds: 1 in 25.841
Instant win	$10	1:20.0
Overall odds (with Instant Win): 1 in 11.5

The game’s drawings were held on Mondays and Thursdays.

The game ended on January 22, 2007, replaced with Mix & Match, which lasted until May 31, 2010.

Despite Lucky for Life (not related to the current multi-state game of that name) not being a total success, Pennsylvania joined the multi-state Cash4Life on April 7, 2015. Unlike the Pennsylvania LFL, Cash4Life has two lifetime prize tiers; winners of either can choose the lifetime annuity or the cash option.

=== Super 7 (2009–2010) ===
Super 7 was re-introduced on March 11, 2009; the first drawing of the Super 7 revival was two nights later. It was a revival of the game of the same name which ran from 1986 to 1995.

This version of Super 7 was played by selecting seven numbers from a field of 77, with each selection costing $2. Every Tuesday and Friday night during the live evening televised drawings at 6:59 p.m. ET, the Lottery drew 11 numbers from 77 numbered balls. If all 7 numbers on a player's ticket matched any 7 of the 11 balls drawn, the player won a jackpot that is paid either in 30 annual installments, or in lump sum, depending on the player's choice. Unlike in Mega Millions or Powerball, where the jackpot choice is made after winning, Super 7 players were required to make the choice when playing; the payment option could not be changed after winning. Except for the $2 fifth prize, all payouts were parimutuel.

The prize structure was as follows:

Numbers matched	Probability	Payout	Average prize (if known)
7 of 11	1:7,287,298	Varies; 48.16% after deduction of fifth-level ($2) prizes, divided among all 7-of-11 winners.	
6 of 11	1:78,866.9	Varies; 13.42% after deduction of fifth-level ($2) prizes, divided among all 6-of-11 winners.	$10,000
5 of 11	1:2,426.7	Varies; 21.81% after deduction of fifth-level ($2) prizes, divided among all 5-of-11 winners.	$500
4 of 11	1:159.3	Varies; 16.61% after deduction of fifth-level ($2) prizes, divided among all 4-of-11 winners.	$25
3 of 11	1:20.2	Fixed at $2	
Overall odds of winning: 1 in 17.81

The payout percentage in Super 7 is 52.19% (the original Super 7's payout percentage was 49%).

On April 13, 2010, the Pennsylvania Lottery announced that the revival of Super 7, which had begun just over a year earlier, would hold its final drawing on April 27, 2010. The Lottery cited the addition of Mega Millions to its portfolio early in the year; Super 7 was drawn on Tuesday and Friday nights, the same as Mega Millions. The jackpot was not won the final drawing; the jackpot rolled down to those matching at least 4 numbers (those matching 3 numbers won $2). Super 7 was not replaced, although, about a month later, an updated version of Match 6 replaced Mix & Match.

=== Mix & Match ===
Mix & Match involved selecting five numbers from 1 through 19, as well as the order in which they will be drawn. There were two ways to win: A) for matching three or more numbers in any order ("mixing"), and B) for matching at least one number in its correct position ("matching".) The jackpot started at $50,000 (lump sum) and was won by matching all five numbers in the order in which they were drawn. Games cost $2 each. Mix & Match was drawn during the live nighttime televised drawings at 6:58:50 p.m. ET Mondays and Thursdays.

Numbers matched in exact order ("Match")	Probability	Payout
5 of 5	1:1,395,360	Jackpot
4 of 5	1:19,934	$1,000
3 of 5	1:661.3	$100
2 of 5	1:22.75	$4
1 of 5	1:4.77	Free Ticket

Numbers matched in any order ("Mix")	Probability	Payout
5 of 5	1:11,268	$2,000
4 of 5	1:166	$20
3 of 5	1:12.8	$2

Overall odds of winning were 1 in 3.57.

The Lottery had planned to retire Mix & Match on November 3, 2009, replacing it with a new game, Double Play. These plans were put on hold by Lottery officials the previous month, and Double Play ultimately never materialized.

Mix & Match did eventually end, however. It held its final drawing on May 31, 2010, and was replaced by a revival of Match 6.

=== Monopoly Millionaires' Club ===
Pennsylvania was among 23 jurisdictions participating in the launch of the Monopoly Millionaires' Club (MMC) multistate drawing game on October 19, 2014. The game was drawn Fridays beginning October 24. With the December 12 drawing, Texas suspended sales of MMC tickets; the 22 other MMC members participated in two more drawings. (A game show featuring MMC players had episodes taped; they aired beginning March 28, 2015) Pennsylvania's MMC payouts for the final drawing were pari-mutuel, and were much higher than the fixed payouts for each prize tier.

In late March 2015, MMC returned as a scratch-off game; as of April 6, there were nine lotteries offering it. Pennsylvania had committed to offering the $5 instant game; as with the draw game, players of the MMC scratch ticket could win a trip-for-two to Las Vegas to participate in a taping of the MMC television game show, which was hosted by Mike & Molly's Billy Gardell, a native of Pittsburgh.

The MMC scratch game (which varied by state) and TV game show were discontinued in 2016.

== Instant games ==
Besides offering terminal-based games, the Pennsylvania Lottery has many instant games (such tickets are usually referred to as "scratch off tickets"). Approximately 42% of Lottery proceeds are from instant ticket sales. The Lottery website maintains an updated list. Pennsylvania Lottery - Benefits Older Pennsylvanians. Every Day.

The Pennsylvania Lottery uses an animatronic groundhog called "Gus", who claims that he is the "second-most-famous groundhog in Pennsylvania" (after Punxsutawney Phil), as the mascot for instant games in television commercials which appear around the beginning of every month.

Pennsylvania instant games range in price from $1 to $50. Typically, higher-priced tickets offer better odds of winning, higher top prizes (up to $1 million for a $20 game; $2,500,000 cash or a $3 million annuity for a $25 game, $3 million cash for a $30 game, and $5 million cash for a $50 game), and a higher payout percentage. Payouts range from 57% of sales ($1 tickets) to 76.94% ($30 tickets), to over 80% ($50 tickets).

Originally, a winning ticket was denoted by two matching letters in the play area. Later, this was updated to the winning amount being highlighted with parentheses at the top or bottom of the play area, in order, but not necessarily consecutively; for example, a $100 winner would be denoted (1)(0)(0). Still later, three letters were scattered around the play area, spelling out the winning amount; for example, a prize of $100 is denoted H U N; losing tickets are denoted with a combination of: B, J, K, P, Q, and Z. Any prize over $2,500 on newer tickets is denoted with the letters "C L M" for "claim"; tickets released prior to July 2008 used C L M for amounts over $500. Starting with tickets released at the end of November 2010, tickets no longer have validation codes; an area marked "Scratch to Cash" must be scratched off by the player, revealing a bar code. Concurrent with the removal of validation codes, the Pennsylvania lottery also removed benday, a random pattern of squiggly lines used as a security feature.

== Fast Play ==
On February 28, 2017, the Pennsylvania Lottery began offering "Fast Play" games. A Fast Play game is printed from a lottery terminal, however, it is played in a similar manner to the instant games. Typically, the player must match one or more numbers or symbols to the designated winning symbols in order to win. Currently, Fast Play games are offered at price points of $1, $2, $3, $5, $10, $20, and $30.

Certain Fast Play games may offer a progressive jackpot which increases with each ticket sold until a jackpot winning ticket is generated, at which point the jackpot resets to a base amount.

== Political impact ==
A 2016 study of winners of the Pennsylvania Lottery found that its winners had an increased probability of shifting towards the right of the political spectrum. The largest effect was found among winners who were not yet registered to vote. Upon registering, they were 9.6% more likely to register as Republicans than non-winners. This suggests that positive economic shocks have a greater political impact on individuals who are not typically involved in politics or have indistinct political allegiances.

== Lottery offices ==
The Pennsylvania Lottery maintains seven lottery offices, including its headquarters:

- Area 1: Philadelphia
- Area 2: Wilkes-Barre
- Area 3: Middletown (headquarters)
- Area 4: Clearfield
- Area 5: Pittsburgh
- Area 6: Erie
- Area 7: Bethlehem

== Claiming a winning ticket ==
Pennsylvania Lottery retailers can pay prizes up to $2,500. (Until June 30, 2008, the maximum on such tickets was $500.) Claiming a prize of $600 or more requires filling out a standard claim form and sending it to Lottery headquarters. For instant games that make annuity payments, as well as the top prizes in Cash 5, etc. a claim should be filed at an area lottery office. For Mega Millions or Powerball jackpots, or either “life” prize in Cash4Life, a claim must be filed at Lottery headquarters.

== Winnings and taxes ==
When filing a standard claim form, the claimant, the retailer, and the Pennsylvania Lottery each receive a copy (the form is triplicate). The Lottery then reports all winnings to the IRS. For federal income tax purposes, any lottery winnings over $2,500 in a fiscal year are taxable. However, when the winning amount is greater than $5,000, the Pennsylvania Department of Revenue withholds the proper amount of federal income tax before a check is mailed to the claimant. Pennsylvania Lottery winnings by Pennsylvania residents are exempt from state tax; however, winnings may be subject to local taxes for residents of some municipalities (e.g. Philadelphia).

== Triple Six Fix of 1980 - 2027 ==
The host of the Pennsylvania Lottery drawings, Nick Perry, and seven others participated in a plot to "rig" The Daily Number, colloquially known as the "Triple Six Fix." On the night of April 24, 1980, the number 666 was drawn; of the then-record $3.5 million payout, $1.8 million was "paid" to those that were in on the fix. Lottery authorities became suspicious after rumors began that the drawing was fixed. Ticket sales showed a heavy bias towards combinations of only 4s and 6s in that drawing. Perry, in conjunction with Peter and Jack Maragos, Jerry Hammer, and five other men either were convicted or entered plea-bargains for their involvement.

== 1997 special event ==
To celebrate the Lottery's 25th anniversary in 1997, Jonathan Goodson, who at the time produced several other lottery game shows, produced a special event for the Pennsylvania Lottery, similar to Illinois Instant Riches, hosted by Dick Clark (well known to Pennsylvanians as the creator of American Bandstand), with Gigi Gordon as his co-host. Players won up to $365,000 on the show; two of its games were Vortex and Freefall, both from Illinois Instant Riches.

== Drawings ==
All Pennsylvania Lottery physical drawings take place in a studio of the WITF Media Center in Swatara Township, with automated drawings being done by random number generators at lottery headquarters. All drawings are supervised by Harrisburg-based Zelenkofske Axelrod. Previous auditors of the drawings include the firms KPMG Hernwick, Boyer & Ritter, Wooton & Kneisley, the Huber Group, and Akryoyd and Associates. Each drawing is conducted by a lottery security official (wearing a shirt bearing the PA Lottery logo) and is accompanied by a senior citizen witness aged 55 and older. From March 2020 to June 2021, and again from August 2021 to March 2022, due to the COVID-19 Pandemic, the senior citizen witnesses were replaced by WITF's staff observing instead.

The drawings last 90 seconds on weekdays, two minutes on Saturdays and one minute on Sundays. The mid-day drawing lasts 45 seconds.

Like most US lotteries, the Pennsylvania Lottery broadcasts drawings on a network of broadcast television stations: WTAJ-TV (Altoona), WPXI (Pittsburgh), WGAL (Lancaster/Harrisburg), WJET-TV (Erie), WTXF-TV (Philadelphia), and WNEP-TV (Scranton). Portions of the Commonwealth, particularly in the Northern Tier, are unable to see the drawings as the lottery does not affiliate with out-of-state stations, mainly because they are served by television markets in New York (e.g. the Bradford region, which has some stations from Erie, but not WJET) or Ohio (served by stations in Youngstown). Pennsylvania's midday drawings are only viewable online. Because New Jersey does not have a station that airs Mega Millions nor Powerball drawings, WTXF-TV airs the drawings for Central and Southern New Jersey as well.

== See also ==
- Gambling
- Lotteries in the United States
