= List of Mike & Molly episodes =

Mike & Molly is an American television sitcom created by Mark Roberts. Billy Gardell and Melissa McCarthy star as the two title characters, who begin to date after meeting at an Overeaters Anonymous group. The series premiered on CBS on September 20, 2010. Roberts and Chuck Lorre serve as executive producers. On March 12, 2015, CBS renewed Mike & Molly for a sixth and final season, which premiered on January 6, 2016.

During the course of the series, 127 episodes of Mike & Molly aired over six seasons, between September 20, 2010, and May 16, 2016.

== Series overview ==
Season	Episodes	Originally released		Rank	Average viewers (in millions)
Season	Episodes	First released	Last released	Rank	Average viewers (in millions)
1	24	September 20, 2010	May 16, 2011	35	11.14
2	23	September 26, 2011	May 14, 2012	31	11.51
3	23	September 24, 2012	May 30, 2013	37	10.22
4	22	November 4, 2013	May 19, 2014	33	9.58
5	22	December 8, 2014	May 18, 2015	44	9.91
6	13	January 6, 2016	May 16, 2016	51	8.46

== Episodes ==
=== Season 1 (2010–11) ===
No. overall	No. in season	Title	Directed by	Written by	Original release date	Prod. code	U.S. viewers (millions)
1	1	"Pilot"	James Burrows	Mark Roberts	September 20, 2010	296772	12.23
2	2	"First Date"	James Burrows	Mark Roberts & Chuck Lorre	September 27, 2010	2J5852	11.12
3	3	"First Kiss"	James Burrows	Mark Roberts & Al Higgins	October 4, 2010	2J5853	12.21
4	4	"Mike's Not Ready"	James Burrows	Mark Roberts & Chuck Lorre	October 11, 2010	2J5854	10.72
5	5	"Carl Is Jealous"	James Burrows	Mark Roberts & Don Foster	October 18, 2010	2J5855	10.90
6	6	"Mike's Apartment"	James Burrows	Mark Roberts & Julie Bean	October 25, 2010	2J5856	10.81
7	7	"After the Lovin'"	James Burrows	Mark Roberts & Don Foster & Mark Gross	November 1, 2010	2J5857	10.75
8	8	"Mike Snores"	James Burrows	Mark Roberts & Don Foster & Carla Filisha	November 8, 2010	2J5858	10.80
9	9	"Mike's New Boots"	James Burrows	Mark Roberts & Don Foster & Al Higgins	November 15, 2010	2J5859	12.15
10	10	"Molly Gets a Hat"	James Burrows	Mark Roberts & Don Foster & Mark Gross	November 22, 2010	2J5860	12.93
11	11	"Carl Gets a Girl"	James Burrows	Mark Roberts & Chuck Lorre & Don Foster	December 6, 2010	2J5861	11.04
12	12	"First Christmas"	James Burrows	Mark Roberts & Don Foster	December 13, 2010	2J5862	11.96
13	13	"Mike Goes to the Opera"	James Burrows	Story by : Mark Roberts & Chuck Lorre; Teleplay by : Don Foster & Al Higgins	January 3, 2011	2J5863	12.39
14	14	"Molly Makes Soup"	James Burrows	Mark Roberts & Don Foster & Mark Gross	January 17, 2011	2J5864	12.80
15	15	"Jim Won't Eat"	James Burrows	Story by : Mark Roberts & Don Foster; Teleplay by : Al Higgins & Julie Bean	February 7, 2011	2J5865	12.55
16	16	"First Valentine's Day"	James Burrows	Mark Roberts & Chuck Lorre & Don Foster	February 14, 2011	2J5866	12.92
17	17	"Joyce & Vince and Peaches & Herb"	James Burrows	Story by : Mark Roberts & Don Foster; Teleplay by : Mark Gross & Al Higgins	February 21, 2011	2J5867	11.20
18	18	"Mike's Feet"	James Burrows	Story by : Mark Roberts & Don Foster; Teleplay by : Mark Gross & Al Higgins	February 28, 2011	2J5868	11.35
19	19	"Peggy Shaves Her Legs"	James Burrows	Story by : Mark Roberts & Don Foster; Teleplay by : Julie Bean & Carla Filisha	March 21, 2011	2J5869	9.70
20	20	"Opening Day"	James Burrows	Story by : Mark Roberts & Jim Patterson; Teleplay by : Don Foster & Al Higgins	April 11, 2011	2J5870	7.91
21	21	"Samuel Gets Fired"	James Burrows	Story by : Mark Roberts & Don Foster; Teleplay by : Al Higgins & Julie Bean	April 18, 2011	2J5871	9.98
22	22	"Cigar Talk"	James Burrows	Story by : Mark Roberts & Don Foster & Chuck Lorre; Teleplay by : Al Higgins & Mark Gross	May 2, 2011	2J5872	8.19
23	23	"Victoria's Birthday"	James Burrows	Story by : Mark Roberts & Don Foster & Chuck Lorre; Teleplay by : Julie Bean & Carla Filisha & Jim Patterson	May 9, 2011	2J5873	7.63
24	24	"Peggy's New Beau"	James Burrows	Story by : Mark Roberts & Don Foster & Chuck Lorre; Teleplay by : Al Higgins & Mark Gross	May 16, 2011	2J5874	8.64

=== Season 2 (2011–12) ===
No. overall	No. in season	Title	Directed by	Written by	Original release date	Prod. code	U.S. viewers (millions)
25	1	"Goin' Fishin'"	James Burrows	Story by : Chuck Lorre & Mark Roberts; Teleplay by : Julie Bean & Don Foster & Al Higgins	September 26, 2011	2J6501	13.86
26	2	"Dennis's Birthday"	James Burrows	Story by : Chuck Lorre & Mark Roberts; Teleplay by : Don Foster & Mark Gross & Carla Filisha	October 3, 2011	2J6502	13.20
27	3	"Mike in the House"	James Burrows	Story by : Chuck Lorre & Mark Roberts; Teleplay by : Don Foster & Al Higgins & Julie Bean	October 10, 2011	2J6503	11.65
28	4	"'57 Chevy Bel Air"	James Burrows	Story by : Chuck Lorre & Mark Roberts; Teleplay by : Don Foster & Mark Gross & Carla Filisha	October 17, 2011	2J6504	11.51
29	5	"Victoria Runs Away"	James Burrows	Story by : Chuck Lorre & Mark Roberts; Teleplay by : Don Foster & Al Higgins & Julie Bean	October 24, 2011	2J6505	12.19
30	6	"Happy Halloween"	James Burrows	Story by : Chuck Lorre & Mark Roberts; Teleplay by : Don Foster & Al Higgins & Julie Bean	October 31, 2011	2J6507	11.45
31	7	"Carl Meets a Lady"	James Burrows	Story by : Chuck Lorre & Mark Roberts; Teleplay by : Don Foster & Mark Gross & Carla Filisha	November 7, 2011	2J6506	11.93
32	8	"Peggy Gets a Job"	James Burrows	Story by : Chuck Lorre & Mark Roberts; Teleplay by : Don Foster & Mark Gross & Carla Filisha	November 14, 2011	2J6508	12.18
33	9	"Mike Cheats"	James Burrows	Story by : Chuck Lorre & Mark Roberts; Teleplay by : Don Foster & Al Higgins & Julie Bean	November 21, 2011	2J6509	13.05
34	10	"Molly Needs a Number"	James Burrows	Story by : Chuck Lorre & Mark Roberts; Teleplay by : Don Foster & Mark Gross & Carla Filisha	December 5, 2011	2J6510	12.66
35	11	"Christmas Break"	James Burrows	Story by : Chuck Lorre & Mark Roberts; Teleplay by : Don Foster & Al Higgins & Julie Bean	December 12, 2011	2J6511	12.77
36	12	"Carl Has Issues"	James Burrows	Story by : Mark Roberts & Chuck Lorre; Teleplay by : Don Foster & Mark Gross & Carla Filisha	January 2, 2012	2J6512	11.90
37	13	"Victoria Can't Drive"	James Burrows	Story by : Mark Roberts & Chuck Lorre; Teleplay by : Don Foster & Al Higgins & Julie Bean	January 16, 2012	2J6513	11.09
38	14	"Joyce's Choices"	James Burrows	Story by : Mark Roberts & Chuck Lorre; Teleplay by : Don Foster & Mark Gross & Carla Filisha	February 6, 2012	2J6514	10.95
39	15	"Valentine's Piggyback"	James Burrows	Story by : Mark Roberts & Chuck Lorre; Teleplay by : Don Foster & Al Higgins & Julie Bean	February 13, 2012	2J6515	10.91
40	16	"Surprise"	James Burrows	Story by : Mark Roberts & Chuck Lorre; Teleplay by : Don Foster & Mark Gross & Carla Filisha	February 20, 2012	2J6516	11.33
41	17	"Mike Likes Lasagna"	James Burrows	Story by : Mark Roberts & Chuck Lorre; Teleplay by : Don Foster & Al Higgins & Julie Bean	February 27, 2012	2J6517	10.12
42	18	"Peggy Goes to Branson"	James Burrows	Story by : Mark Roberts; Teleplay by : Don Foster & Al Higgins & Mark Gross	March 19, 2012	2J6518	9.71
43	19	"Molly Can't Lie"	James Burrows	Story by : Mark Roberts & Bill Daly; Teleplay by : Don Foster & Al Higgins & Mark Gross	April 9, 2012	2J6519	9.58
44	20	"The Dress"	James Burrows	Story by : Mark Roberts & Chuck Lorre; Teleplay by : Don Foster & Al Higgins	April 16, 2012	2J6520	9.54
45	21	"Bachelor/Bachelorette"	James Burrows	Story by : Mark Roberts & Don Foster; Teleplay by : Al Higgins & Julie Bean	April 30, 2012	2J6521	10.16
46	22	"The Rehearsal"	James Burrows	Story by : Mark Roberts & Don Foster; Teleplay by : Al Higgins & Julie Bean	May 7, 2012	2J6522	10.14
47	23	"The Wedding"	James Burrows	Story by : Mark Roberts & Don Foster; Teleplay by : Mark Gross & Carla Filisha	May 14, 2012	2J6523	11.79

=== Season 3 (2012–13) ===
No. overall	No. in season	Title	Directed by	Written by	Original release date	Prod. code	U.S. viewers (millions)
48	1	"The Honeymoon Is Over"	Mark Roberts	Story by : Mark Roberts & Don Foster; Teleplay by : Al Higgins & Mark Gross	September 24, 2012	2J6751	9.45
49	2	"Vince Takes a Bath"	Jason Alexander	Story by : Mark Roberts & Don Foster; Teleplay by : Al Higgins & Julie Bean	October 1, 2012	2J6752	8.52
50	3	"Mike Likes Cake"	Phill Lewis	Story by : Mark Roberts & Don Foster; Teleplay by : Al Higgins & Carla Filisha	October 8, 2012	2J6753	8.67
51	4	"Molly in the Middle"	Phill Lewis	Story by : Mark Roberts & Don Foster; Teleplay by : Al Higgins & Julie Bean & Carla Filisha	October 15, 2012	2J6754	9.10
52	5	"Mike's Boss"	Phill Lewis	Story by : Mark Roberts & Don Foster; Teleplay by : Al Higgins & Julie Bean	November 5, 2012	2J6755	8.78
53	6	"Yard Sale"	Phill Lewis	Story by : Mark Roberts & Al Higgins; Teleplay by : Don Foster & Carla Filisha & Mark Gross	November 12, 2012	2J6756	9.24
54	7	"Thanksgiving Is Cancelled"	Phill Lewis	Story by : Mark Roberts & Don Foster; Teleplay by : Al Higgins & Mark Gross	November 19, 2012	2J6758	9.25
55	8	"Mike Likes Briefs"	Phill Lewis	Story by : Mark Roberts & Don Foster; Teleplay by : Al Higgins & Julie Bean	November 26, 2012	2J6757	11.29
56	9	"Mike Takes a Test"	Phill Lewis	Story by : Mark Roberts & Don Foster; Teleplay by : Al Higgins & Mark Gross	December 3, 2012	2J6760	10.23
57	10	"Karaoke Christmas"	Phill Lewis	Story by : Mark Roberts & Don Foster; Teleplay by : Al Higgins & Mark Gross & Carla Filisha	December 17, 2012	2J6761	10.79
58	11	"Fish for Breakfast"	Phill Lewis	Story by : Mark Roberts & Don Foster; Teleplay by : Al Higgins & Carla Filisha	January 14, 2013	2J6759	11.46
59	12	"Molly's Birthday"	Mark Roberts	Story by : Mark Roberts & Don Foster; Teleplay by : Al Higgins & Julie Bean	January 21, 2013	2J6762	10.89
60	13	"Carl Gets a Roommate"	Mark Roberts	Story by : Mark Roberts & Don Foster; Teleplay by : Al Higgins & Julie Bean & Carla Filisha	February 4, 2013	2J6763	10.77
61	14	"The Princess and the Troll"	Phill Lewis	Story by : Mark Roberts; Teleplay by : Don Foster & Mark Gross & Brian Keith Etheridge	February 11, 2013	2J6764	10.50
62	15	"Mike the Tease"	Phill Lewis	Story by : Mark Roberts; Teleplay by : Al Higgins & Julie Bean & Carla Filisha	February 18, 2013	2J6765	10.33
63	16	"Molly's New Shoes"	Phill Lewis	Story by : Mark Roberts; Teleplay by : Don Foster & Al Higgins & Mark Gross	February 25, 2013	2J6766	9.79
64	17	"St. Patrick's Day"	Phill Lewis	Story by : Mark Roberts; Teleplay by : Julie Bean & Carla Filisha	March 18, 2013	2J6767	8.38
65	18	"Spring Break"	Phill Lewis	Story by : Mark Roberts; Teleplay by : Don Foster & Al Higgins & Mark Gross	March 25, 2013	2J6768	8.99
66	19	"Party Planners"	Phill Lewis	Story by : Mark Roberts; Teleplay by : Mark Gross & Brian Keith Etheridge	April 15, 2013	2J6769	7.76
67	20	"Mike Can't Read"	Mark Roberts	Story by : Mark Roberts; Teleplay by : Don Foster & Julie Bean & Carla Filisha	April 29, 2013	2J6770	8.14
68	21	"Molly's Out of Town"	Mark Roberts	Story by : Mark Roberts; Teleplay by : Don Foster & Al Higgins & Brian Keith Etheridge	May 6, 2013	2J6772	8.08
69	22	"School Recital"	Mark Roberts	Story by : Mark Roberts; Teleplay by : Don Foster & Al Higgins & Mark Gross	May 13, 2013	2J6771	8.31
70	23	"Windy City"	Mark Roberts	Story by : Mark Roberts; Teleplay by : Don Foster & Mark Roberts	May 30, 2013	2J6773	8.01

=== Season 4 (2013–14) ===
No. overall	No. in season	Title	Directed by	Written by	Original release date	Prod. code	U.S. viewers (millions)
71	1	"Molly Unleashed"	Phill Lewis	Story by : Chuck Lorre & Al Higgins; Teleplay by : Julie Bean & Mark Gross & Carla Filisha	November 4, 2013	2J6851	9.22
72	2	"The First and Last Ride-Along"	Phill Lewis	Story by : Chuck Lorre & Al Higgins; Teleplay by : Bill Daly & Julie Bean & Mark Gross	November 11, 2013	2J6852	8.65
73	3	"Sex and Death"	Phill Lewis	Story by : Chuck Lorre & Al Higgins; Teleplay by : Brian Keith Etheridge & Bill Daly & Julie Bean	November 18, 2013	2J6853	8.08
74	4	"Careful What You Dig For"	Phill Lewis	Story by : Chuck Lorre & Al Higgins; Teleplay by : Mark Gross & Carla Filisha & Brian Keith Etheridge	November 25, 2013	2J6855	8.48
75	5	"Poker in the Front, Looker in the Back"	Phill Lewis	Story by : Chuck Lorre & Al Higgins; Teleplay by : Carla Filisha & Brian Keith Etheridge & Bill Daly	December 2, 2013	2J6854	8.71
76	6	"Shoeless Molly Flynn"	Phill Lewis	Story by : Chuck Lorre & Al Higgins; Teleplay by : Crystal Jenkins & Aaron Vaccaro & Marla DuMont	December 9, 2013	2J6856	7.78
77	7	"They Shoot Asses, Don't They?"	Phill Lewis	Story by : Chuck Lorre & Al Higgins; Teleplay by : Julie Bean & Mark Gross & Carla Filisha	December 16, 2013	2J6857	8.88
78	8	"What Molly Hath Wrought"	Stephen Prime	Story by : Chuck Lorre & Al Higgins; Teleplay by : Brian Keith Etheridge & Bill Daly & Julie Bean	January 13, 2014	2J6859	9.84
79	9	"Mike & Molly's Excellent Adventure"	Phill Lewis	Story by : Chuck Lorre & Al Higgins; Teleplay by : Bill Daly & Julie Bean & Mark Gross	January 20, 2014	2J6858	8.92
80	10	"Weekend at Peggy's"	Phill Lewis	Story by : Chuck Lorre & Al Higgins; Teleplay by : Carla Filisha & Brian Keith Etheridge & Bill Daly	January 27, 2014	2J6860	10.76
81	11	"Dips & Salsa"	Phill Lewis	Story by : Chuck Lorre & Al Higgins; Teleplay by : Mark Gross & Carla Filisha & Brian Keith Etheridge	February 3, 2014	2J6861	10.27
82	12	"Mind Over Molly"	Phill Lewis	Story by : Chuck Lorre & Al Higgins; Teleplay by : Crystal Jenkins & Aaron Vaccaro & Marla DuMont	February 24, 2014	2J6862	8.16
83	13	"Open Mike Night"	Phill Lewis	Story by : Al Higgins; Teleplay by : Julie Bean & Mark Gross & Carla Filisha	March 3, 2014	2J6863	8.91
84	14	"Rich Man, Poor Girl"	David Trainer	Story by : Chuck Lorre & Al Higgins; Teleplay by : Bill Daly & Julie Bean & Mark Gross	March 10, 2014	2J6864	7.67
85	15	"Three Girls and an Urn"	David Trainer	Story by : Al Higgins; Teleplay by : Brian Keith Etheridge & Bill Daly & Julie Bean	March 17, 2014	2J6865	7.70
86	16	"The Dice Lady Cometh"	Victor Gonzalez	Story by : Al Higgins & Crystal Jenkins; Teleplay by : Carla Filisha & Brian Keith Etheridge & Bill Daly	March 24, 2014	2J6866	7.83
87	17	"McMillan and Mom"	Michael McDonald	Story by : Chuck Lorre & Al Higgins; Teleplay by : Mark Gross & Carla Filisha & Brian Keith Etheridge	April 14, 2014	2J6867	7.49
88	18	"Mike's Manifold Destiny"	Steve Prime	Story by : Chuck Lorre & Kevin Lappin & Connor Kilpatrick; Teleplay by : Al Higgins & Julie Bean & Mark Gross	April 21, 2014	2J6872	7.33
89	19	"Who's Afraid of J.C. Small?"	Melissa McCarthy	Story by : Chuck Lorre & Al Higgins; Teleplay by : Crystal Jenkins & Aaron Vaccaro & Marla DuMont	April 28, 2014	2J6869	7.60
90	20	"Sex, Lies and Helicopters"	Victor Gonzalez	Story by : Chuck Lorre & Aaron Vaccaro & Marla DuMont; Teleplay by : Al Higgins & Julie Bean & Mark Gross	May 5, 2014	2J6868	6.54
91	21	"This Old Peggy"	David Trainer	Story by : Chuck Lorre & Al Higgins; Teleplay by : Bill Daly & Carla Filisha & Brian Keith Etheridge	May 12, 2014	2J6870	6.95
92	22	"Eight Is Enough"	David Trainer	Story by : Chuck Lorre & Al Higgins; Teleplay by : Bill Daly & Carla Filisha & Brian Keith Etheridge	May 19, 2014	2J6871	7.05

=== Season 5 (2014–15) ===
No. overall	No. in season	Title	Directed by	Written by	Original release date	Prod. code	U.S. viewers (millions)
93	1	"The Book of Molly"	Michael McDonald	Story by : Chuck Lorre & Al Higgins; Teleplay by : Julie Bean & Mark Gross & Carla Filisha	December 8, 2014	3J5001	8.06
94	2	"To Have and Withhold"	Michael McDonald	Story by : Chuck Lorre & Al Higgins; Teleplay by : Mark Gross & Carla Filisha & Bill Daly	December 15, 2014	3J5002	7.85
95	3	"Tis the Season to Be Molly"	Michael McDonald	Story by : Al Higgins & Brian Keith Etheridge; Teleplay by : Bill Daly & Rob DesHotel & Michael Glouberman	December 22, 2014	3J5014	8.52
96	4	"Gone Cheatin"	Michael McDonald	Story by : Chuck Lorre & Al Higgins; Teleplay by : Carla Filisha & Bill Daly & Rob DesHotel	December 29, 2014	3J5003	8.32
97	5	"Molly's Neverending Story"	David Trainer	Story by : Al Higgins; Teleplay by : Bill Daly & Rob DesHotel & Michael Glouberman	January 5, 2015	3J5005	9.64
98	6	"The Last Temptation of Mike"	David Trainer	Story by : Al Higgins; Teleplay by : Bill Daly & Rob DesHotel & Michael Glouberman	January 12, 2015	3J5004	9.19
99	7	"Support Your Local Samuel"	Carole Lazarus	Story by : Chuck Lorre & Al Higgins; Teleplay by : Brian Etheridge & Crystal Jenkins & Aaron Vaccaro	January 19, 2015	3J5007	9.22
100	8	"Mike Check"	Melissa McCarthy	Story by : Chuck Lorre & Al Higgins; Teleplay by : Julie Bean & Mark Gross & Carla Filisha	February 2, 2015	3J5008	9.87
101	9	"Hack to the Future"	David Trainer	Story by : Chuck Lorre & Al Higgins; Teleplay by : Michael Glouberman & Brian Etheridge & Crystal Jenkins	February 9, 2015	3J5006	9.32
102	10	"Checkpoint Joyce"	Victor Gonzalez	Story by : Al Higgins & Mark Gross; Teleplay by : Julie Bean & Aaron Vaccaro & Marla Dumont	February 16, 2015	3J5009	9.32
103	11	"Immaculate Deception"	Victor Gonzalez	Story by : Chuck Lorre & Al Higgins; Teleplay by : Marla Dumont & Julie Bean & Mark Gross	February 23, 2015	3J5010	8.91
104	12	"The World According to Peggy"	Victor Gonzalez	Story by : Al Higgins & Carla Filisha; Teleplay by : Crystal Jenkins & Aaron Vaccaro & Marla DuMont	March 2, 2015	3J5011	9.65
105	13	"Buy the Book"	Michael McDonald	Story by : Chuck Lorre & Al Higgins; Teleplay by : Mark Gross & Carla Filisha & Bill Daly	March 9, 2015	3J5012	8.80
106	14	"What Ever Happened to Baby Peggy?"	Michael McDonald	Story by : Al Higgins & Michael Glouberman; Teleplay by : Carla Filisha & Bill Daly & Rob Deshotel	March 16, 2015	3J5013	8.57
107	15	"Pie Fight"	Michael McDonald	Story by : Al Higgins & Bill Daly; Teleplay by : Rob DesHotel & Michael Glouberman & Brian Keith Etheridge	March 23, 2015	3J5015	7.77
108	16	"Cocktails and Calamine"	Michael McDonald	Story by : Al Higgins & Rob Deshotel; Teleplay by : Michael Glouberman & Brian Keith Etheridge & Crystal Jenkins	March 30, 2015	3J5016	7.65
109	17	"Mudlick or Bust"	Michael McDonald	Story by : Al Higgins & Marla DuMont; Teleplay by : Brian Keith Etheridge & Crystal Jenkins & Aaron Vaccaro	April 13, 2015	3J5017	7.49
110	18	"No Kay Morale"	Melissa McCarthy	Story by : Al Higgins & Julie Bean; Teleplay by : Crystal Jenkins & Aaron Vaccaro & Marla DuMont	April 20, 2015	3J5018	8.13
111	19	"Mother From Another Mudlick"	Michael McDonald	Story by : Al Higgins & Aaron Vaccaro; Teleplay by : Marla DuMont & Julie Bean & Mark Gross	April 27, 2015	3J5020	7.19
112	20	"Fight to the Finish"	Stephen Prime	Story by : Al Higgins & Connor Kilpatrick & Kevin Lappin; Teleplay by : Bill Daly & Rob DesHotel & Michael Glouberman	May 4, 2015	3J5022	6.79
113	21	"Near Death Do Us Part"	Joel Murray	Story by : Al Higgins & Crystal Jenkins; Teleplay by : Aaron Vaccaro & Marla DuMont & Julie Bean	May 11, 2015	3J5019	7.69
114	22	"The Bitter Man and the Sea"	Victor Gonzalez	Story by : Al Higgins & Jim Patterson; Teleplay by : Julie Bean & Mark Gross & Carla Filisha	May 18, 2015	3J5021	7.75

=== Season 6 (2016) ===
No. overall	No. in season	Title	Directed by	Written by	Original release date	Prod. code	U.S. viewers (millions)
115	1	"Cops on the Rocks"	Michael McDonald	Story by : Al Higgins & Julie Bean; Teleplay by : Mark Gross & Carla Filisha & Bill Daly	January 6, 2016	3J6101	6.73
116	2	"One Small Step for Mike"	Michael McDonald	Story by : Al Higgins & Carla Filisha; Teleplay by : Bill Daly & Brian Keith Etheridge & Rob DesHotel	January 13, 2016	3J6103	7.14
117	3	"Peg O'My Heart Attack"	Michael McDonald	Story by : Al Higgins & Mark Gross; Teleplay by : Carla Filisha & Bill Daly & Brian Keith Etheridge	January 20, 2016	3J6102	7.04
118	4	"Super Cop"	Michael McDonald	Story by : Al Higgins & Bill Daly; Teleplay by : Brian Keith Etheridge & Rob DesHotel & Michael Glouberman	January 27, 2016	3J6104	6.89
119	5	"Joyce's Will Be Done"	Michael McDonald	Story by : Al Higgins & Brian Keith Etheridge; Teleplay by : Rob DesHotel & Michael Glouberman & Steve Joe	February 3, 2016	3J6105	6.84
120	6	"The Good Wife"	Michael McDonald	Story by : Al Higgins & Rob DesHotel; Teleplay by : Michael Glouberman & Steve Joe & Alex Herschlag	February 10, 2016	3J6106	6.63
121	7	"Weekend With Birdie"	Michael McDonald	Story by : Al Higgins & Michael Glouberman; Teleplay by : Steve Joe & Alex Herschlag & Julie Bean	April 25, 2016	3J6107	6.90
122	8	"The Wreck of the Vincent Moranto"	Michael McDonald	Story by : Al Higgins & Steve Joe; Teleplay by : Alex Herschlag & Julie Bean & Mark Gross	May 2, 2016	3J6108	6.94
123	9	"Baby, Please Don't Go"	Michael McDonald	Story by : Al Higgins & Alex Herschlag; Teleplay by : Julie Bean & Mark Gross & Carla Filisha	May 2, 2016	3J6109	7.20
124	10	"Baby Bump"	Michele Azenzer Bear	Story by : Al Higgins; Teleplay by : Brian Keith Etheridge & Bill Daly & Rob DesHotel	May 9, 2016	3J6111	7.73
125	11	"The Adoption Option"	Michael McDonald	Story by : Al Higgins & Chuck Lorre; Teleplay by : Connor Kilpatrick & Kevin Lappin & Dave Pilson	May 9, 2016	3J6110	8.06
126	12	"Curse of the Bambino"	Melissa McCarthy	Story by : Al Higgins; Teleplay by : Michael Glouberman & Steve Joe & Alex Herschlag	May 16, 2016	3J6112	7.87
127	13	"I See Love"	James Burrows	Story by : Al Higgins & Chuck Lorre; Teleplay by : Julie Bean & Mark Gross & Carla Filisha	May 16, 2016	3J6113	8.45
