= Georgia Lottery =

U.S. state government lottery

Georgia Lottery Corporation
- Formation: 1992
- Type: Lottery System
- Headquarters: Atlanta, Georgia, United States
- Website: galottery.com

The Georgia Lottery Corporation, known as the Georgia Lottery, is overseen by the government of Georgia, United States. Headquartered in Atlanta, the lottery takes in over US$1 billion yearly. By law, half of the money goes to prizes, one-third to education, and the remainder to operating and marketing the lottery. The education money funds the HOPE Scholarship, and has acted as a model for other lotteries, including the South Carolina Education Lottery.

== History ==
A government-run lottery was explicitly allowed in a 1992 constitutional amendment to Article I, Section II, Paragraph VIII of the Georgia State Constitution, approved in a referendum. The GLC was created by a separate bill in 1992 by the Georgia General Assembly, and then-governor of Georgia, Zell Miller, in the Lottery for Education Act (OCGA 50-27). Rebecca Paul, who began the Florida Lottery, then ran the Georgia Lottery for its first decade, before leaving to launch Tennessee Lottery in 2004.

The original in-house weekly jackpot game, Lotto Georgia, merged with two similar games in 2001 to become Lotto South, in an attempt to create larger jackpots. In February 2006, Lotto South ended.

In the mid-1990s, Georgia, then offering Powerball for the first time, joined The Big Game (now Mega Millions) when it began in 1996. Several days after Georgia began selling The Big Game tickets, it was forced to leave the Multi-State Lottery Association (MUSL), which continues to administer Powerball. (In October 2009, an agreement was reached between Mega Millions and the Powerball group allowing Mega Millions and Powerball tickets to be available, simultaneously, by each US lottery. Most lotteries, including Georgia's, offered both games beginning January 31, 2010.

== Current draw games ==
=== In-house draw games ===
==== Instant games ====
Instant games are scratch tickets also called "scratch-offs". A player scratches a thin film from the ticket to see if the ticket is a winner. The prizes are smaller than other lottery games, but there are better odds. There are dozens of instant games on sale at any time, and the selection of games changes frequently. They range in price from $1 to $50.

==== Cash 3 ====
Cash 3 is played three times daily. Three machines, each containing balls numbered 0 through 9, are used; one ball is drawn from each machine. Play styles vary: for example, a $1 "straight" bet (a player guesses a three-digit number will be drawn in exact order) pays $500 for a winning ticket. Other options of play include "Box" (any order), "Straight/Box"($.50 for a straight play and $.50 for a boxed play), Front Pair (where you must match the first two numbers drawn in the exact order), and Back Pair (where a player must match the last two numbers drawn in the exact order). Cash 3 began August 10, 1993.

==== Cash 4 ====
Cash 4 also is drawn three times daily; it is played similarly to Cash 3, except with 4 digits, and four ball machines are used. A $1 "straight" wager (see above) wins $5,000 for a winning ticket. Cash 4 began April 6, 1997.

==== Georgia Five ====
Georgia Five is a 5-digit numbers game. Georgia 5 is drawn twice daily; it has a top prize of $10,000. It was introduced on August 1, 2010. Georgia Five is different from most pick-3 and pick-4 games; players do not choose straight, box, or similar wagers. The top prize is won by matching all five numbers in exact order; a player wins by matching at least the first or last digit.

==== Fantasy 5 ====
Fantasy 5 is a once daily game that draws 5 of 42 numbers (originally was 35 and then 39). Games are $1 per play. Jackpots begin at $125,000 and increase if there is no top prize winner. Fantasy 5 also has a Ca$h Match option for an additional $1 per game. Matching the ticket's Fantasy 5 numbers to any of the Ca$h Match numbers within the ticket wins a cash prize. The Ca$h Match option can be won up to five times on each ticket. Fantasy 5 has been played since November 14, 1994.

==== Keno ====
Keno is played every four minutes at many lottery retailers. Twenty numbers from 1 through 80 are selected and displayed on a monitor. Players choose 1 to 10 numbers. Keno has a multiplier option, for an extra $1 per play, that multiplies prizes by 1x, 2x, 3x, 5x or 10x.

=== Multi-jurisdictional games ===
==== Cash4Life ====
Georgia joined Cash4Life on August 29, 2016. (The game is also available in Florida, Indiana, Maryland, New Jersey, New York, Pennsylvania, Tennessee, and Virginia.)

Players choose 5 of 60 numbers in one field, and 1 of 4 green "Cash Ball" numbers in the second field. Live drawings are held on Monday and Thursday evenings at 9 pm Eastern Time on Livestream. The top prize (win or share) $1,000-per-day-for-life. The second prize is $1,000-per-week-for-life. Unlike the former multi-state draw game Win for Life (see below), winners of a "lifetime" prize can choose cash in lieu of the lifetime annuity.

==== Mega Millions ====
In the mid-1990s, Georgia helped launch The Big Game (now Mega Millions) when it began in 1996. (Its drawings usually are held in Atlanta.) Mega Millions players choose six numbers for $5; five "white ball" numbers, 1 through 70, and a sixth (Mega Ball) number, 1 through 24. (The Mega Ball number can be a duplicate of a "white ball" number.) The minimum jackpot is $50 million. Mega Millions replaced The Big Game in 2002. The Megaplier option, initially available only in Texas, was made available to Georgia's players on November 7, 2010, which became built-in following the April 2025 format changes.

==== Powerball ====
In October 2009, an agreement was reached allowing Mega Millions and Powerball tickets to be sold through US lotteries, then with either game. Georgia, which joined Powerball in 1995, and sold The Big Game and Powerball tickets for a few days in 1996 before being forced out of Powerball, rejoined Powerball on January 31, 2010.

Powerball began in 1992; the Power Play option in 2001. In January 2012, the price of a Powerball play increased to $2, or $3 with Power Play.

== Retired draw games ==
=== Monopoly Millionaires' Club ===
Monopoly Millionaires' Club (MMC) began sales on October 19, 2014, in 22 states and the District of Columbia. Due to unexpectedly poor sales, and an unexpected early jackpot win, only 10 MMC drawings were held.

A television game show featuring MMC contestants aired from March 28, 2015, to 2016; later episodes were for contestants who won access to the show via a scratch ticket; the scratch tickets were printed after the draw game ended.

=== Decades of Dollars ===
Decades of Dollars began in 2011; it was launched in Georgia, Kentucky, and Virginia as an alternative game to Win for Life. (Arkansas joined a few months after DoD began.) DoD was replaced by Monopoly Millionaires′ Club in Arkansas, Georgia, and Kentucky; in 2015, Virginia ended sales of DoD.

Winners had the choice of $250,000 per year in 30 installments, or $4,000,000 cash.

=== Win for Life ===
Win for Life replaced Lotto South in 2006. It was offered in Georgia, Kentucky, and Virginia; it was a 6-of-42 game that drew a seventh number (the "Free Ball") for lower-tier prizes. Top prize was $1,000-a-week-for-life; there was never a gamewide "cash option", unlike the current Cash4Life (although Virginia offered it when the game began.) Win for Life ended as a Virginia-only game with a cash option.

=== Lotto South ===
Lotto South was offered in Georgia, Kentucky, and Virginia from 2001 to 2006 (it was a 6-of-49 game, using the same matrix as the Virginia-only game that preceded it.)

=== Change Game ===
This game began in 2002. In this game players got a six character combination from A0000A to Z9999Z for a change amount ranging from 25 cents to 99 cents for a chance to be one of three guaranteed winners every evening. Players had to match all six characters in the exact order to win a prize that depends on how much money they pay for each game played. The Georgia Lottery ended the game in 2004 due to declining sales.

=== 5 Card Cash ===
5 Card Cash was drawn daily and also had an instant win feature. Each 5 Card Cash play costed $2 and only one play printed on a ticket. Each ticket had a quick pick play with five card symbols, no card knowledge or skill is needed to play. Players could win instantly at the time of purchase if the card symbols on their ticket match a specified winning hand from the prize structure. The top prize for the nightly drawing was $150,000. At the nightly drawings, players had to match at least two cards to win a prize. The start and end dates were unknown.

=== All or nothing ===
The Georgia Lottery launched this game on March 2, 2014. The game was played by picking 12 numbers from 24 for a chance to win prizes up to $250,000. Drawings were held 4 times daily. The game’s end date was unknown.

=== Jumbo Bucks Lotto ===
Jumbo Bucks Lotto was a twice-weekly game (Mondays and Thursdays) that draws 6 of 47 numbers. Games are $1 per play. Jackpots begin at $1,000,000 and increase if there's no jackpot winner. Jumbo Bucks Lotto also has a Ca$h Match option for an additional $1 per game. Matching the ticket's Jumbo Bucks Lotto numbers to any of the 'Ca$h Match' numbers within the ticket wins a cash prize. The Ca$h Match option can be won up to five times on each ticket. Additionally, each Ca$h Match purchase includes a Multiplier that automatically prints on the player's ticket. The Multiplier increases the player's Ca$h Match winnings up to 10 times(1X, 2X, 3X, 4X, 5X, or 10X). The Multiplier applies to Ca$h Match winnings only and does not apply to Jumbo Bucks LOTTO draw winnings. Jumbo Bucks Lotto has been played since February 2015. The largest jackpot was $15.2 million which was won by a single ticket holder who won the jackpot in July 2023. "Jumbo Bucks Lotto" got retired after the final drawing on November 14th 2024.
