= Decades of Dollars =

Decades of Dollars (DoD) was an American lottery game that began as a multi-state game in January 2011, though by its end, only the Virginia Lottery offered it. Georgia and Kentucky joined Virginia in launching DoD; Arkansas joined in May 2011. (DoD replaced Win for Life in Kentucky; WFL ended in 2014 as a Virginia-only game.)

DoD became a Virginia-only game in October 2014 when the other three states joined the Monopoly Millionaires' Club drawing game. DoD held its final drawing on April 30, 2015; Virginia replaced it with the multi-state Cash4Life, becoming its fourth member, but non-contiguous with its other three states.

Decades of Dollars was drawn Monday and Thursday nights. DoD winners had a choice of 30 annual payments of $250,000 each (minus withholdings) or a lump sum of $4,000,000.

Each Decades of Dollars game cost $2; players chose 6 numbers from 1 through 47.

DoD prize structure:

- Match 2 of 6: free DoD play or $2 (Kentucky and Virginia players received a DoD play; Arkansas and Georgia winners won $2.)
- Match 3 of 6: $10 cash
- Match 4 of 6: $100 cash
- Match 5 of 6: $10,000 cash
- Match 6 of 6: $250,000 per year in 30 installments or $4,000,000 cash

Unexpectedly, none of the game's first 112 drawings produced a top-prize winner (of either payment option.) Finally, for the March 5, 2012 drawing, a ticket sold in Georgia matched all six numbers.

Arkansas never produced a top prize in DoD.

- Decades of Dollars top-prize winners:
  - 2011 (none)
  - 2012 (7 to date):
    - March 5: Evans, Georgia
    - March 8: Smyrna, Georgia
    - April 12: Norfolk, Virginia
    - April 26: Madisonville, Kentucky
    - May 3: McDonough, Georgia
    - May 10: Waynesboro, Virginia
    - August 16: Florence, Kentucky
  - 2013: (none)
  - 2014:
    - October Atlanta, Georgia

All Decades of Dollars top-prize winners chose the cash option.

Decades of Dollars drawings were conducted by the Georgia Lottery at WSB-TV in Atlanta (which hosts Mega Millions drawings); the ball sets and drawing machines moved to Virginia.

The first drawing game which linked Georgia, Kentucky, and Virginia was Lotto South, which began in 2001 and ended in 2006. That game was replaced by Win for Life; the three states offered WFL into 2011, when Kentucky dropped it as part of the launch of DoD. Georgia pulled out of WFL a few months before Virginia discontinued the game.
