= Lotto South =

Multi-state lottery, 2001–2006

Lotto South was a three-state lottery game in Georgia, Kentucky, and Virginia, which ran from 2001 to 2006. It resulted from the September 2001 merger of three smaller jackpot games, one from each of the three lotteries. This was done in an attempt to create larger jackpots.

Drawings took place at the WTVR-TV studios in Richmond, Virginia, on Wednesdays and Saturdays at 11:00 p.m. ET. Jackpots began at $2 million (annuitized); top-prize winners could choose to be paid either in 30 annual payments, or the cash option. The game was jointly administered by the Georgia Lottery, Kentucky Lottery, and Virginia Lottery.

Sales of the game began on September 9, 2001.

Its record jackpot was $27 million, won on December 31, 2005.

The game had four prize levels; players needed to match at least three numbers to win. All prizes were paid on a parimutuel basis. The jackpot was paid either in cash or 30 annual payments, according to the winners' wishes.

In January 2006, it was announced that the game would be retired; its final drawing took place on February 25, 2006. That jackpot was not won; the lower-tier prizes doubled (instead of rolling down the entire prize pool, which lotteries often do when a jackpot game is retired.) The three lotteries kept the rest of the money. Lotto South′s replacement was Win for Life, which ended in 2011 in Kentucky and winter 2014 in Georgia; Win for Life was retired on September 13, 2014, after which Virginia replaced it with $1,000,000 Moneyball.

Georgia, Kentucky, and Virginia began sales of Decades of Dollars on January 30, 2011. (Arkansas joined on May 3, 2011.) Decades of Dollars became a Virginia-only game in October 2014, as the other three lotteries were part of the launch of Monopoly Millionaires' Club.
