= I See Love =

I See Love may refer to:

- "I See Love" (Mike & Molly), a television episode
- "I See Love" (Jonas Blue song), 2018
- "I See Love", a 1992 song by CeCe Peniston from Finally
- "I See Love", a 2006 song by Keb' Mo' from Suitcase
