= The Werewolf Transformation =

- The Big Bang Theory episode
- Episode no.: Season 5 Episode 18
- Directed by: Mark Cendrowski
- Story by: Chuck Lorre; Todd Craig; Gary Torvinen
- Teleplay by: Bill Prady; Steven Molaro; Jim Reynolds; Maria Ferrari
- Production code: 3X6868
- Original air date: February 23, 2012
- Running time: 21 minutes

Guest appearances
- Peter Onorati as Angelo; Carol Ann Susi as Mrs. Wolowitz; Vernee Watson as Althea

Episode chronology
← Previous "The Rothman Disintegration"	Next → "The Weekend Vortex"
- The Big Bang Theory season 5

"The Werewolf Transformation" is the 18th episode of the fifth season of the U.S. sitcom The Big Bang Theory and the 105th episode of the show overall. It first aired on CBS on February 23, 2012.

In the episode, Sheldon (Jim Parsons) abandons his methodical approach to life after failing to get a haircut from his usual barber, while Howard (Simon Helberg) has a rough time in his astronaut training. The episode was submitted for Parsons' Emmy nomination, but received mixed reactions from critics.

== Plot ==
Sheldon goes to get a haircut; his usual barber Mr. D'Onofrio is in a coma, so the barber's nephew Angelo is there instead. Sheldon is uncomfortable with the situation and runs away. Later, he talks to his friends; Penny offers to cut his hair while Raj and Amy suggest other barbers. He rejects all of their ideas.

Sheldon goes to visit Mr. D'Onofrio in hospital. When the nurse sees him with scissors, expecting to get a haircut, she calls security and he has to leave. He accepts that he is not going to get a haircut, but also abandons all of his meticulous planning (for example, his bowel movement spreadsheet), realizing it has been a waste of time.

Early in the morning, Leonard and Penny wake up to find Sheldon playing a bongo drum, as Richard Feynman played bongos. They try to make him stop but he leaves the apartment, eventually falling asleep on Amy's couch. The next morning, Penny convinces him to let her cut his hair, but she accidentally shaves off part of the back of his hair.

Meanwhile, Howard is summoned for astronaut training by NASA. After his first day of training, he talks to Bernadette via webcam; he vomited while experiencing near-weightlessness. Next, he is forced to go on overnight survival training, where he is spooned by an armadillo during a sandstorm. Bernadette goes to visit Howard in Houston, but finds his mother already there, taking care of him.

== Production ==
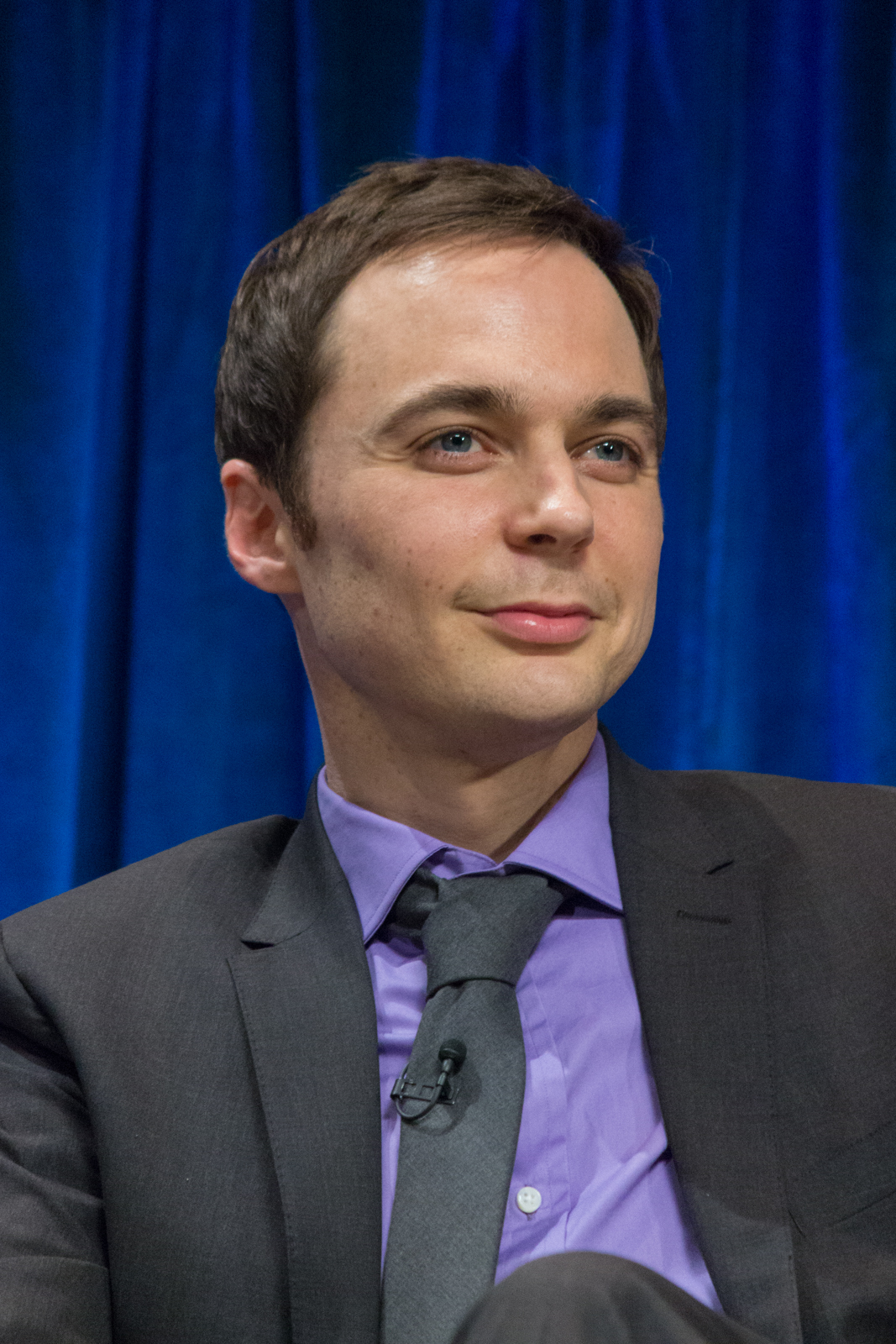
Jim Parsons at PaleyFest in 2013.

At the 64th Primetime Emmy Awards, Jim Parsons received a nomination for Primetime Emmy Award for Outstanding Lead Actor in a Comedy Series. He submitted "The Werewolf Transformation" for consideration. Alan Sepinwall predicted on HitFix that Parsons would win, which would have been the third time in a row Parsons had won the award. However, he lost to Jon Cryer, who played Dr. Alan Harper in Two and a Half Men.

Vernee Watson-Johnson, who has appeared on several episodes of the show including the pilot, appeared briefly in the episode as Mr. D'Onofrio's nurse.

== Reception ==
=== Ratings ===
"The Werewolf Transformation" was first broadcast in the U.S. on CBS on February 23, 2012 at 8 p.m., and was watched by 16.2 million viewers, the highest viewing figure that night, and ranking #5 for the week. It earned a 5.3 rating and a 16 share in the 18-49 demographic. On the same night in Canada, the episode garnered 3.513 million viewers on CTV Total, making it the second-most watched television show that week.

In Australia, the episode aired on the Nine Network on March 12, 2012. It was watched by 1.312 million households and came third in the nightly rank. In the UK on E4, "The Werewolf Transformation" was first broadcast on April 26, 2012; the episode garnered 1.609 million viewers, along with 0.377 million watches on the timeshift channel E4 +1. It was first on the weekly ratings for both channels.

=== Reviews ===
Will Harris from The A.V. Club gave the episode a B+, describing it as "relatively strong" while claiming there were "some imperfections in characterization" of Sheldon and that "Raj had little more than cameo status" in the episode. Harris was "actually moved" when Bernadette arrived at Howard's hotel room in Houston. R. L. Shaffer of IGN gave "The Werewolf Transformation" 6.5 out of 10 and described it as a "good filler episode"; however, the subplot was criticized as viewers never see Howard experiencing hardships in training, and due to the "sour end" where Howard's mother is revealed to be staying with him in the hotel. Shaffer also suggested that episode would have been a good opportunity for Sheldon to have sex with Amy. Jim Garner of TV Fanatic gave the episode 3.8 out of 5 stars, saying that while it "wasn't the most hysterically funny episode of the season, it did explore some fun areas of our favorite geeks". However, Garner criticized the Howard subplot, saying that it had been "lingering" for too long and that "we [should] go ahead and shoot Howard in to space and be done with it".

Robin Pierson of The TV Critic rated the episode 43 out of 100. Pierson had "mixed feelings" about Howard's storyline, but described Sheldon's plot as "tedious". When Sheldon abandoned the systematic organization of his life, "the episode was half over already", so he did not have a chance to "question anything seriously". Jill Mader from Inside Pulse described the episode as "solidly average", commenting that Sheldon's reaction was not surprising given his "strong signs of Autism Spectrum". Howard's subplot was described as "pretty funny", although Mrs. Wolowitz's appearance was described as an "easy joke".
