= Lottery games with a lifetime prize =

Lottery games with "lifetime" prizes, known by names such as Cash4Life, Lucky for Life, and Win for Life, comprise two types of United States lottery games in which the top prize is advertised as a lifetime annuity; unlike annuities with a fixed period (such as 25 years), lifetime annuities often pay (sometimes for decades) until the winner's death.

== Scratch games ==
Most U.S. lotteries offer at least one scratch game with lifetime prizes.

These games vary; some lotteries offer multiple price points for "lifetime" games, with the top prize ranging from $50 daily to $1,000,000 yearly. Play for each game varies.

Increasingly, American lotteries have introduced a cash option for winners of scratch games with such prizes (as they had begun in the 20th century with fixed annuities in almost all games, drawing or scratchcard.)

== Draw games ==
The "Win for Life" game (which replaced "Lotto South") began in 2006 in Georgia, Kentucky, and Virginia. Kentucky dropped out in 2011, and Georgia in 2014, leaving Virginia as its only member. "Win for Life" was retired following the September 13, 2014 drawing; it was replaced by $1,000,000 Moneyball, a Virginia-only game since replaced by Bank a Million.

In Win for Life, players chose six numbers from 1 through 42; seven numbers were drawn, including the "Free Ball". Top prize was $1000-per-week; there was a cash option of $1 million (offered when WFL became a Virginia-only game; when WFL began Virginia offered a $520,000 cash option, but the choice was eliminated the following year as neither Georgia nor Kentucky offered winners a cash option.) Second prize was $52,000 cash.

When Kentucky dropped WFL, Georgia, Kentucky, and Virginia began "Decades of Dollars", which later added Arkansas. On October 19, 2014, Decades of Dollars no longer was available in Arkansas, Georgia, or Kentucky; the three lotteries participated in the launch of "Monopoly Millionaires' Club", whose sales were suspended in December. Decades of Dollars held its final drawing on April 30, 2015; Virginia then joined the multi-state "Cash4Life".

In 2015, Kentucky joined Lucky for Life (which began in 2009 as a Connecticut-only game, "Lucky-4-Life") and Virginia joined the rival "Cash4Life". On August 28, 2016, Georgia joined Cash4Life; both games mentioned here have two lifetime prize tiers; winners of a "lifetime" prize can choose cash in lieu of annuity payments.

As of 2021, Cash4Life has 10 members while Lucky for Life has 25; Missouri has offered both games, although not simultaneously. Missouri ended sales of Lucky for Life on April 8, joining Cash4Life three days later.
