= Vernee Watson-Johnson =

American actress (b. 1949)

- Born: Vernee Christell Watson; September 28, 1949 (age 77); New York City, U.S.
- Education: New York University (Bachelor of Arts)
- Occupations: Actress; author; acting coach
- Years active: 1970–present
- Known for: Vernajean Williams – Welcome Back, Kotter; Dee Dee Skyes – Captain Caveman and the Teen Angels; Viola "Vy" Smith – The Fresh Prince of Bel-Air; Gloria Tyler – Bob Hearts Abishola; Stella Henry – General Hospital
- Spouses: Joe Duckett (m. 1976; div. 1977) Van Johnson (m. 1979; div. 1991)
- Children: 2

Vernee Christell Watson (born September 28, 1949) is an American actress, author, and acting coach. Watson-Johnson is known for her recurring roles as Vernajean Williams on Welcome Back, Kotter (1975–1979), as Viola "Vy" Smith on The Fresh Prince of Bel-Air (1990–1996), playing the mother of Will Smith's character, and head nurse Gloria Tyler on Bob Hearts Abishola (2019–2024). She is often featured in guest or recurring roles as a nurse. Since 2017 she has played Stella Henry on General Hospital.

== Early life ==
Vernee Christell Watson was born in New York City, where she was also raised. She graduated from Cathedral High School and New York University with a major in drama. She began her professional career at age 17 with the Al Fann Theatrical Ensemble in Manhattan and would tour with the group for five years.

== Career ==
Watson-Johnson played Blue's love interest in the 1972 film Trick Baby. She was also a regular cast member of the 1985–1986 situation comedy Foley Square as Denise Willums, the secretary for Alex Harrigan, played by the show's star, Margaret Colin. She played a small role on Sister, Sister as Lisa's (Jackée Harry) best friend Patrice, and as the mayor's secretary, Lucille Banks, on Carter Country. She also had a recurring role as "Birdie" on The Young and the Restless. In 2005, she appeared in the film Christmas with the Kranks. In addition, Watson-Johnson has made appearances in episodes of television shows as The Love Boat, Hill Street Blues, Married... with Children, L.A. Law, Suddenly Susan, Dharma & Greg, The X-Files, ER, Days of Our Lives, Malcolm in the Middle, CSI: Crime Scene Investigation, Desperate Housewives, Ghost Whisperer, Benson, The Big Bang Theory, Good Times, Dexter, Two and a Half Men, Southland, Criminal Minds, A.N.T. Farm, What's Happening!!, Young Sheldon, Jessie, Mike and Molly, and several other series.

Watson-Johnson has additionally appeared in several TV commercials for various national brands, including McDonald's, Polaroid, Kellogg's, Pillsbury, Lysol, Taco Bell, IBM, Procter & Gamble, and Walmart.

As a voice actress, she has been tied to Hanna-Barbera Productions and Warner Bros. Animation with roles in shows such as Captain Caveman and the Teen Angels, Laff-A-Lympics, A Pup Named Scooby-Doo, Animaniacs, Batman: The Animated Series, Superman: The Animated Series and Batman Beyond, as well as the feature film The Ant Bully, and several video games related to these productions. From 1991 to 1992, she lent her voice to the show Baby Talk, where she was the voice of baby Danielle (played by Alicia and Celicia Johnson). In 2006, Watson-Johnson had roles in three films: The Ant Bully, The Celestine Prophecy and Garfield: A Tale of Two Kitties. In 2017, Watson-Johnson was cast as Stella Henry on General Hospital, aunt of Donnell Turner's character Curtis Ashford. She won two Daytime Emmy Award for Outstanding Special Guest Performer in a Drama Series for the role in 2018 and 2019.

She guest starred as Helen on Peacock's dramatic Fresh Prince reimagining Bel-Air in its ninth episode. She plays Gabby’s (Jessica Williams) mother on the Apple TV+ show Shrinking.

== Personal life ==
Watson-Johnson has been married twice. Her first marriage was to Joe Duckett from 1976 until 1977, and she was last married to photographer Van Johnson from 1979 to 1991. Watson-Johnson has a daughter named Sunde Jinia Johnson (b. 1983) and a son named Josh (b. 1987) with Johnson. In 2005, Watson-Johnson was a witness in Michael Jackson's child molestation trial.

== Filmography ==
=== Film ===
Year	Title	Role	Notes	Ref.
1970	Cotton Comes to Harlem	Woman		
1972	Trick Baby	Cleo Howard		
1976	Norman... Is That You?	Melody	Credited as Vernée Watson	
1978	Death Drug	Carolyn Thomas		
1981	All Night Long	Emily	Credited as Vernee Watson	
1987	G.I. Joe: The Movie	Scientist	Voice	
1991	Showdown in Little Tokyo	Nonnie Russell – Coroner		
1993	Batman: Mask of the Phantasm	Additional voices		
2000	Batman Beyond: Return of the Joker	Joyce Carr (voice)	Direct-to-video	
2002	Antwone Fisher	Annette Elkins		
2004	Christmas with the Kranks	Dox		
2005	The Legend of Frosty the Snowman	Mrs. Wader (voice)	Direct-to-video	
2006	The Ant Bully	Head Nurse (voice)		
2006	Garfield: A Tail of Two Kitties	Tourist #2	Credited as Vernée Watson Johnson	
2019	Clemency	Mrs. Collins		
2019	The Mandela Effect	Nadine		
2025	Attack of the Killer Tomatoes: Organic Intelligence			

=== Television ===
Year	Title	Role	Notes	Ref.
1975	That's My Mama!	Thelma	Episode: "That's Earl, Brother"	
1975–1976	Welcome Back, Kotter	Verna Jean Williams	13 episodes	
1977–1978	Scooby's All-Star Laff-A-Lympics	Dee Dee Skyes (voice)	Main role	
1977	What's Happening!!	Judy Crane	Episode: "Nice Guys Finish Last"	
1977	Good Times	Valerie	2 episodes	
1977–1979	Carter Country	Lucille Banks	44 episodes	
1977–1980	Captain Caveman and the Teen Angels	Dee Dee Skyes (voice)	Main role	
1978–1984	The Love Boat	Various	4 episodes	
1979	The World's Greatest Super Friends	University Scientist (voice)	Episode: "Universe of Evil"	
1979–1981	Fantasy Island	Various	3 episodes	
1981	The Jeffersons	Carol	Episode: "I've Still Got It"	
1984	Benson	Elaine	2 episodes	
1985–1986	Foley Square	Denise Willums	14 episodes	
1990–1996	The Fresh Prince of Bel-Air	Viola "Vy" Smith	15 episodes	
1991–1992	Baby Talk	Danielle Craig (voice)	20 episodes	
1991	Hell Hath No Fury	Tyleen	Television film	
1993	Batman: The Animated Series	Dana Blessing, Doctor (voice)	2 episodes	
1993–1994	Grace Under Fire	Vicki Hudson	2 episodes	
1994–1996	Animaniacs	Mrs. Jenny, Robin (voice)	2 episodes	
1996	Superman: The Animated Series	Female Neighbor, Female Worker (voice)	2 episodes	
1996–1997	Sister, Sister	Patrice	5 episodes	
1999	The Young and the Restless	Birdie	Recurring role, 19 episodes	
1999–2000	Batman Beyond	Lorraine Tate (voice)	2 episodes	
2001–2003	Static Shock	Mrs. Watkins (voice)	2 episodes	
2002	The West Wing	Nurse	Episode: "Twenty Five"	
2002	The X-Files	Nurse Whitney Edwards	Episode: "Audrey Pauley"	
2004, 2011, 2012	Two and a Half Men	Nurse	3 episodes	
2005	The Bernie Mac Show	Aunt Sis	Episode: "Who Gives This Bride"	
2006	Dexter	Doakes's Mother	Episode: "Return to Sender"	
2006	Desperate Housewives	ER Doctor	Episode: "Listen to the Rain on the Roof"	
2006	Ghost Whisperer	Traci Cotter	Episode: "Giving up the Ghost"	
2007	Days of Our Lives	Dr. Ella Kraft	9 episodes	
2007–2016	The Big Bang Theory	Nurse Althea	6 episodes	
2009	Criminal Minds	Miss Hightower	Episode: "To Hell... And Back"	
2010	House	Nurse Smits	2 episodes	
2010	Melissa & Joey	Miss Lunt	Episode: "Pilot"	
2011	Good Luck Charlie	Principal Hibbert	Episode: "Teddy's Bear"	
2011	Castle	Mercy	Episode: "Demons"	
2013	Mr. Box Office	Mrs. Owens	Episode: "Holy Matriphony"	
2013	A.N.T Farm	Granny	Episode: "early retiremANT"	
2014	Jessie	Mrs. Harris	Episode: "From the White House to Our House"	
2015	Two and a Half Men	Karen	Episode: "Boompa Loved His Hookers"	
2016	School of Rock	Mrs. Calpakis	2 episodes	
2016	NCIS	Miss Helen Frimkes	Episode: "Being Bad"	
2016	Mike & Molly	Blanche	Episode: "I See Love"	
2017–present	General Hospital	Stella Henry	Recurring role	
2017–2019	Young Sheldon	Nurse Robinson	2 episodes; credited as Vernee Watson	
2018	Superstore	Lilian	Episode: "Delivery Day"	
2018	The Resident	Mary Phillips	Episode: "The Elopement"	
2018	Home by Spring	Mrs. Wilson	Television film	
2019–2024	Bob Hearts Abishola	Gloria Tyler	Main role, credited as Vernee Watson	
2022	Bel-Air	Helen	Episode: "Can't Knock The Hustle"	
2024	Shrinking	Phyllis	Episode: "Honesty Era"	
2024	WondLa	Ol' Crusty (voice)	Episode: "Chapter 3: Bargain"	
2025	Matlock	Celeste Carlisle	season 2 episode 7 "Prior Bad Acts"	
2026	The Four Seasons	Beverly	2 episodes; credited as Vernee Watson	

=== Video games ===
Year	Title	Role
2003	True Crime: Streets of LA	Dispatcher
2004	Grand Theft Auto: San Andreas	Pedestrian
2006	The Ant Bully	Head Nurse
2020	Mafia: Definitive Edition	Additional voices
2026	Grand Theft Auto VI	The Local Population

== Awards and nominations ==
Year	Award	Category	Title	Result	Ref.
2018	Daytime Emmy Award	Outstanding Guest Performer in a Drama Series	General Hospital	Won	
2019	Daytime Emmy Award	Outstanding Supporting Actress in a Drama Series	General Hospital	Won	
