= Monopoly Millionaires' Club (game show) =

- Genre: Game show
- Created by: Kevin Belinkoff; Todd P. Levitt; Steven Saferin; Kyle Rogers
- Based on: Monopoly Millionaires' Club by the Multi-State Lottery Association (under license by Hasbro); Monopoly by Hasbro
- Directed by: Ron de Moraes
- Presented by: Billy Gardell; Todd Newton
- Starring: Paige Collings; Korrina Rico
- Announcer: Joe Cipriano
- Country of origin: United States
- Original language: English
- No. of seasons: 2
- No. of episodes: 25

Production
- Executive producers: Scott St. John; Kevin Belinkoff; Todd P. Levitt; Billy Gardell; Steve Saferin; Stephen Davis
- Producers: Pam Taffar Lee; Kyle Rogers
- Production locations: Rio All-Suite Hotel and Casino, Las Vegas (season 1); Bally's Las Vegas, Las Vegas (season 2)
- Camera setup: Multi-camera
- Running time: 60 minutes (season 1); 30 minutes (season 2)
- Production companies: Entertain the Brutes; Hasbro Studios; Scientific Games

Original release
- Network: Syndication
- Release: March 28, 2015 – April 30, 2016

Monopoly Millionaires' Club is an American lottery game show that debuted in syndication on March 28, 2015. Hosted by stand-up comedian and actor Billy Gardell, best known for his role as police officer Mike Biggs on the sitcom Mike & Molly, it was initially based on an unsuccessful drawing game of the same name that was coordinated by the Multi-State Lottery Association (MUSL), using the Monopoly board game brand under license from Hasbro. The lottery game returned, in scratch-off form, in the spring of 2015.

Each episode culminated with a round called "Go for a Million", a bonus game with the top prize of $1,000,000. The show originated as an hour-long program in its first season, which aired from March 28 to June 13, 2015, consisting of five games per episode. For the second and final season, which aired from September 12, 2015, to April 30, 2016, the show was reduced to a 30-minute format incorporating only three games. In February 2016, the series was canceled after two seasons, with the final episode airing on April 30, 2016.

== Format ==
=== Main game ===
Each episode featured winners of a second chance drawing (through an online website), who were flown to Las Vegas to participate in the show. One contestant at a time was chosen at random and invited to play a game with a top cash prize of $100,000. Every contestant played a different game and kept half of his/her winnings, with the other half split equally among the drawing winners in his/her section. A total of eight different $100,000 games were played over the course of the series, and each contestant was chosen from a different section.

Episodes were originally taped at the Rio All Suite Hotel and Casino and featured five games per hour-long episode. The audience was split into five sections (battleship, boot, cat, dog, and wheelbarrow—all taken from tokens in the classic U.S. version of Monopoly). Later, the taping location was moved to Bally's Events Center in Bally's Las Vegas and the episodes were reduced to 30 minutes featuring three games. The boot and cat audience sections were initially removed, but later restored.

Residents of states that did not sell lottery tickets during the period of the show's production were not eligible to participate in the program.

Additionally, during each episode, co-host Todd Newton chose a contestant to play a short game for up to $10,000. Two games were played per episode in the first season, and one in the second. Contestants in these games kept their winnings for themselves, but were not eligible to play for the $1 million grand prize. A total of three different $10,000 games were played over the course of the series, with slight rule changes to two of them in the second seaosn.

=== Go for a Million ===
At the end of each episode, one contestant would be able to play "Go for a Million", giving up all previous winnings (including the portion shared with the audience section the contestant represented) for a chance to win up to $1,000,000 in cash and additional prizes. The contestant who decided to give up the most money would get to play this round, while all other contestants kept their respective winnings. If no one volunteered, one of the contestants who had won nothing in their games would be chosen at random to play.

The contestant started at GO and attempted to make one full lap of the Monopoly board within five turns. Two dice were rolled on a shaker table referred to as the "Monopoly Rock-and-Roller". The contestant stopped it by pushing a button and moved clockwise according to the total shown, earning an extra roll whenever a double came up. Property spaces awarded varying cash amounts, starting at $2,000 for Baltic Avenue (landing on Mediterranean Avenue was not possible due to being only one space away from GO) and increasing clockwise to $40,000 for Boardwalk. Other spaces awarded prizes or extra rolls, or triggered mini-games that could award cash/prizes/rolls or penalize the contestant.

The game ended immediately if any of the following occurred:

- Landing on the "Go to Jail" space (contestant lost everything)
- Rolling three consecutive doubles (contestant lost everything)
- Flipping a "Go to Jail" card from Chance or Community Chest (contestant lost everything)
- Landing on Luxury Tax (season 2 only; contestant lost half their cash total)

Running out of turns without reaching GO or going to Jail, or landing on Luxury Tax in Season 2, split the final cash total with the contestant's audience section and allowed the contestant to keep all non-cash prizes. Passing GO augmented the cash total to $200,000, split between the contestant and the section. Landing on GO exactly, either by dice roll or flipping an "Advance to GO" card from Chance or Community Chest, augmented the contestant's cash total to $1,000,000 and split an Audience Jackpot among the section. This jackpot was $200,000 for all but two episodes, in which it was $300,000. Winning the top prize also awarded the contestant a shiny, diamond-encrusted Mr. Monopoly top hat.

Four contestants won the top prize throughout the show's run.

== See also ==
- Monopoly - a game show from 1990 also based on Monopoly
- Family Game Night - a game show that aired from 2010 to 2014 that included Monopoly-themed games
