= I See Love (Mike & Molly) =

- Mike & Molly episode
- Episode no.: Season 6 Episode 13
- Directed by: James Burrows
- Story by: Al Higgins; Chuck Lorre
- Teleplay by: Julie Bean; Mark Gross; Carla Filisha
- Original air date: May 16, 2016

Guest appearances
- Cleo King as Rosetta McMillan 'Nana'; David Anthony Higgins as Harry; Vernee Watson as Blanche

Episode chronology
← Previous "Curse of the Bambino"	Next → —
- Mike & Molly season 6

"I See Love" is the series finale of the sitcom Mike & Molly. The series ran for six seasons, and the final episode aired on May 16, 2016, on CBS. This episode marks the 127th episode of the series. In this episode, the couple reflects on their relationship while they wait for their adopted baby.

== Plot ==
Mike & Molly get a call informing them that the mother of their baby was in labor (three weeks earlier than expected). The whole family runs to the hospital, but before Mike, Molly, Joyce, Vince, Victoria, and Carl (who's back with Victoria) head to Peggy's house to take her. Their adoption advocate, Blanche (Vernee Watson), welcomes them to the hospital and gives them a buzzer that will go off when the baby is born.

As everyone waits for the baby (including Samuel, Nana and Harry), Peggy tells Mike that his plan to live at Joyce's is bad and they should move in with her instead; Joyce doesn't like this and snarls at Peggy, leading the two battle-axes to trade increasingly ugly insults that lead them to the verge of a fistfight. When Joyce jumps into Peggy, Mike pulls her away and Molly announces that if they don't stop, she'll lock the baby up and no one will ever see it. Blanche is standing right behind her and asks if everything is okay, and Molly calms her down, but as soon as Blanche begins to walk away, Joyce and Peggy start fighting again.

Mike takes Carl aside and talks about fatherhood before jumping into how thankful he is to have Carl as a partner and best friend, and he would be the godfather. He tells Carl that he loves him, and Carl just says, “I know,” before saying, “Now you know how it feels.” Over in the maternity ward, Molly starts to panic again, but Victoria lets her know that (except for mornings and weekends) she's there for her. Joyce joins them and tells Molly that she's in store for a whole life of worrying because that's what being a mother is.

Mike goes back to Peggy and she engages in her typical self-pity as she bemoans how she'll never get to see her grandchild because Joyce hates her. He tells her that there's nothing that will keep them apart, with the caveat that Peggy needs to not seek out conflict, but their moment is cut short because the baby phone goes off and Mike runs to find Molly. Everyone gathers in the waiting room and waits until Mike and Molly appear with their newborn son, William Michael Biggs. Molly tells them that she has other news for them as well: she hadn't been feeling well and the reason was that she is finally pregnant. The room glows with smiles and tears of joy for Mike and Molly.

In the final scene, Mike wakes up to find Molly looking over the sleeping newborn at 2 a.m. and they share a conversation that they would not have changed anything in their relationship in the past six years. As the baby wakes, Mike and Molly softly sing together "I See Love", the theme song of the show.

== Cast ==
- Billy Gardell as Mike Biggs
- Melissa McCarthy as Molly Flynn
- Reno Wilson as Carl McMillan
- Katy Mixon as Victoria Flynn
- Nyambi Nyambi as Samuel/Babatunde
- Rondi Reed as Peggy Biggs
- Louis Mustillo as Vince Moranto
- Swoosie Kurtz as Joyce Flynn
- Cleo King as Rosetta McMillan 'Nana'
- David Anthony Higgins as Harry
- Vernee Watson as Blanche

== Production ==
After keeping mum amidst statements from the cast that the show has been canceled, CBS confirmed on January 12, 2016, that the comedy's sixth season would be its last. "These decisions are really challenging," CBS Entertainment president Glenn Geller said at TCA. "I have tremendous respect for (executive producers) Chuck Lorre, Al Higgins, (stars) Melissa McCarthy and Billy Gardell and the entire cast."

== Vanity card ==
Chuck Lorre's signature vanity card, shown at the end of the episode, was as follows:

On behalf of cast and crew, thank you for watching Mike & Molly.

The premise was love, the goal was laughter.

== Reception ==
=== Ratings ===
"I See Love" originally aired on May 16, 2016, on CBS. The finale was viewed by 8.45 million viewers and received a 1.7 rating/6% share among adults between the ages of 18 and 49. This means that it was seen by 1.7 percent of all 18- to 49-year-olds, and 6 percent of all 18- to 49-year-olds watching television at the time of the broadcast. It also ranks as the highest rated episode of the season. The episode ranked third in its timeslot, being beaten by the NBC reality show The Voice (2.1/7, 9.52 million viewers), and the ABC reality show Dancing With the Stars (1.7/6, 11.64 million viewers).

=== Critical reception ===
"I See Love" received positive reviews from critics.

Entertainment Weekly wrote, "Ending just the way it should have, Mike and Molly's best moments came from love. Only rivaled by the admiration of pie that brought them together in the first place, it's the love they have for each other that made the finale as special as the series as a whole. And after six seasons of teaching, patrolling, writing, and attempting to conceive, it's fitting that their onscreen journey ends with the two of them together with their new family. Mike and Molly may not be Chuck Lorre's most memorable or celebrated creation, but in the years after the series has ended, the people who come back to watch it will, if anything, see love."

TheWrap said, "This wrap-up hour successfully pulls off the difficult balancing act of keeping things light and clever while avoiding the kind of mawkishness that too often permeates these finales. It supplies just enough sweetness to leave us feeling sated – and not a calorie more."
