= Billy Gardell =

American actor (born 1968)

- Born: William Gardell Jr. August 20, 1969 (age 57); Swissvale, Pennsylvania, U.S.
- Occupations: Actor; comedian
- Years active: 2000–present
- Spouse: Patty Knight (m. 2001)
- Children: 1

William R. Gardell Jr. (born August 20, 1969) is an American actor and stand-up comedian. Gardell played Chicago police officer Mike Biggs on Mike & Molly. He also had a recurring role as Billy Colivida on Yes, Dear, and he appeared in a dozen episodes of My Name Is Earl as a police officer. Gardell voiced Santa in Ice Age: A Mammoth Christmas, as well as starring on Sullivan & Son in the recurring role of Lyle Winkler. From 2019 to 2024, Gardell played Bob Wheeler in the CBS sitcom series Bob Hearts Abishola.

== Early life ==
Gardell's 1987 yearbook photo at Winter Park High School

Born in Swissvale, Pennsylvania, Gardell attended Winter Park High School in Orange County, Florida, during 1985. As a child, he moved to Florida with his mother and younger siblings after his parents divorced. After that, he only visited Pennsylvania in the summers. He has said living in Florida was a positive experience. At the age of 15, he started working at a department store warehouse in the receiving area, where he would unload trucks and stack pallets. In 1987, he started cleaning bathrooms, seating people, and answering phones at a local comedy club, Bonkerz. On December 28, he started performing at the comedy club's open-microphone nights after he made a dare with some co-workers. "If I didn't do an open mic night, I couldn't cover the bet. I was running my mouth that I would do it. They bet me I wouldn't," he explained. He eventually started opening for Dennis Miller and George Carlin.

Gardell was a member of International Thespian Society Troupe 850, whose other notable alumni include Amanda Bearse, who is a fellow graduate of Winter Park High School, and Ben Rock of The Blair Witch Project.

== Career ==
Gardell is known for his comedic roles and is influenced by Jackie Gleason. He has also listed Richard Pryor, George Carlin, John Candy, and John Belushi as his influences. Although Bonkerz helped launch his comedy career, he has credited the support from his grandmother, saying: "She told me when I was 8 years old that I could be a comic". Before Mike & Molly, Gardell revealed that he considered a career in radio after being on the road for his comedy act began to affect his family time. He has performed in several feature films, including Bad Santa (with Billy Bob Thornton) You, Me and Dupree (with Owen Wilson), and Avenging Angelo (with Sylvester Stallone and Anthony Quinn), as well as appearing numerous times in recurring roles in several US television series, including NBC's Heist, The Practice, Yes, Dear, Desperate Housewives, Lucky, Bones, My Name Is Earl, Monk, and The King of Queens. Gardell appeared as himself on the Comedy Central series Make Me Laugh. Subsequently, he appeared on Miller's television program Dennis Miller, telecast on the US financial news network CNBC (conducting "man-on-the-street" interviews). Notably, he created and staged an SNL-style charity performance of a piece called Winter Park Live, the proceeds from which were donated to Comic Relief.

Gardell continues to make weekly appearances on hometown local radio station WDVE, appearing on The DVE Morning Show. Gardell also appeared on Chelsea Lately, as a roundtable participant. Gardell appeared on a special for Comedy Central Presents in 2007 that aired on April 4, 2008. Gardell also played the host of Pizza Talk, an imaginary TV series, in commercials for Round Table Pizza. In 2006, Gardell's first comedy album, Billy Gardell: Throwback, was released.

From September 2010 to May 2016, Gardell starred in Mike & Molly, alongside Melissa McCarthy. In November 2011, he lent his voice to Santa in Ice Age: A Mammoth Christmas. His stand-up special Halftime was released in 2011 and aired on Comedy Central. It was filmed in Pittsburgh and profiles working-class America. As of 2011, he continued to tour as a stand-up comedian in addition to acting. In a 2011 Orlando Sentinel article, Gardell said he would not mind doing movies again.

In 2013, Gardell's comedy special Billy Gardell Presents Road Dogs premiered on Showtime. In 2015, Gardell started the lottery game show Monopoly Millionaires' Club, featuring contestants who bought tickets for the Monopoly Millionaires' Club lottery game; the latter began on October 19, 2014. Gardell earned a Daytime Emmy nomination for Outstanding Game Show Host in 2016, but lost to Craig Ferguson.

Gardell had a recurring role on the CBS spinoff sitcom Young Sheldon as neighbor Herschel Sparks. In October 2018, he was cast as Bob in the CBS pilot of Bob Hearts Abishola, alongside Folake Olowofoyeku. In May 2019, the series was ordered, and it premiered in September 2019.

Gardell began appearing in advertisements for A1C medication Ozempic in 2021. This followed his involvement in the Ozempic reality series “My Type 2 Transformation” two years previous.

== Personal life ==
Gardell has been married to Patty Knight since 2001. They have a son, William III, born in 2003. His parents still live in Florida, where he occasionally visits them.

Gardell is a Pittsburgh Steelers fan and attended games at Heinz Field. His favorite player growing up was Jack Lambert.

Regarding his weight, Gardell explained in 2011 that he "always had a little gut" and weighed 350 pounds (160 kg) at one point. In 2022, during an interview with Entertainment Tonight, he discussed his weight loss and said that he reduced his weight to 212 pounds (96 kg). Gardell managed his weight loss by changing his lifestyle and having bariatric surgery.

== Filmography ==
=== Film ===
Year	Title	Role	Notes
2002	Avenging Angelo	Bruno	
2003	Bad Santa	Milwaukee Security Guard	
2006	Room 6	Taxi Driver	
2006	You, Me and Dupree	Bartender Dave	
2007	D-War	Mr. Belafonte	
2014	Jersey Boys	Our Sons Owner	
2015	Dancer and the Dame	Dancer	
2016	Undrafted	Umpire Haze	
2017	Once Upon a Time in Venice	Office Bill	
2017	Special Unit	Captain Wynn	
2025	The Electric State	Garbage Bot	Voice
2025	The Vortex	Pete Finnegan.	

=== Television ===
Year	Title	Role	Notes
2000	The King of Queens	Billy Kelner	Episode: "Block Buster"
2000	Judging Amy	Lyle Cooper	4 episodes
2001	Cover Me	Mike Dulgari	Episode: "Vegas Mother's Day: Part 2"
2001	It's Like, You Know	Eddie	Episode: "Lust for Life"
2001–2006	Yes, Dear	Billy Colavita	Recurring role, 26 episodes
2003	Lucky	Vincent Sticcarelli	13 episodes
2003	Gary the Rat	Jackson Buford Harrison	Voice; 3 episodes
2003	Monk	Ian Agnew	Episode: "Mr. Monk and the 12th Man"
2004	The Practice	Manny Quinn	4 episodes
2004	Quintuplets	Brad	2 episodes
2005	CSI: Crime Scene Investigation	Charlie Jackson	Episode: "Iced"
2006	Heist	Billy O'Brien	Main role
2006	Las Vegas	Sid Turner	Episode: "Delinda's Box" Pt. 1
2007	Alive 'N Kickin'	Billy	Television film
2007–2009	My Name Is Earl	Officer Jeff Hoyne	Recurring role, 12 episodes
2008	Comedy Central Presents	Himself	Episode: "Billy Gardell"
2008	Desperate Housewives	Roy Harding	Episode: "The Gun Song"
2009	Bones	Bob Sayles	Episode: "The Beautiful Day in the Neighborhood"
2010–2016	Mike & Molly	Mike Biggs	Lead role
2011	Ice Age: A Mammoth Christmas	Santa	Television special; voice role
2012	Family Guy	Mike Biggs (voice)	Episode: "Ratings Guy"
2012–2014	Sullivan & Son	Lyle Winkler	3 episodes
2013	Phineas and Ferb	Mayor Chickenen	Voice; episode: "Love at First Byte"
2015	The Late Late Show with Craig Ferguson	Himself	Guest host
2015–2016	Monopoly Millionaires' Club	Himself	Host
2016	Be Cool, Scooby-Doo!	Warden Bowman, Prisoner 1	Voice; episode: "If You Can't Scooby-Doo the Time, Don't Scooby-Doo the Crime"
2016	Girl Meets World	Coach Bobby Campagnola	Episode: "Girl Meets High School: Part 2"
2016	New Girl	Jason	Episode: "Es Good"
2017	Sun Records	Colonel Tom Parker	Main role
2017	Angie Tribeca	Officer Depot	Episode: "Go Get 'Em, Tiger"
2017	Dice	Frank Rizanski	2 episodes
2017–present	Funny You Should Ask	Himself	over 100 episodes
2018–2019	Young Sheldon	Herschel Sparks	Recurring role, 5 episodes
2019–2024	Bob Hearts Abishola	Robert "Bob" Wheeler	Lead role
2024	Extended Family	Bill	Episode: "The Consequences of Sushi"
2026	Leanne	Dutch	Episode: "Three Degrees of Southern Women"

== Comedy specials ==
Year	Title	Notes
2006	Throwback	CD only
2011	Halftime	Comedy Central special also CD
2013	Billy Gardell Presents Road Dogs	Showtime special
