= Mike & Molly =

2010 American sitcom

- Genre: Sitcom
- Created by: Mark Roberts
- Showrunners: Mark Roberts; Chuck Lorre; Al Higgins
- Starring: Billy Gardell; Melissa McCarthy; Reno Wilson; Katy Mixon; Nyambi Nyambi; Rondi Reed; Cleo King; Louis Mustillo; David Anthony Higgins; Swoosie Kurtz
- Opening theme: "I See Love" by Keb' Mo'
- Composers: Dennis C. Brown; Grant Geissman
- Country of origin: United States
- Original language: English
- No. of seasons: 6
- No. of episodes: 127 (list of episodes)

Production
- Executive producers: Chuck Lorre; Al Higgins; Mark Roberts; Don Foster; James Burrows; Mark Gross
- Camera setup: Multi-camera
- Running time: 18–22 minutes
- Production companies: Chuck Lorre Productions; Bonanza Productions; Warner Bros. Television

Original release
- Network: CBS
- Release: September 20, 2010 – May 16, 2016

Mike & Molly is an American television sitcom created by Mark Roberts for CBS. It aired from September 20, 2010 to May 16, 2016. The series stars Billy Gardell and Melissa McCarthy as the eponymous Mike and Molly, a couple who meet in a Chicago Overeaters Anonymous group and fall in love.

== Premise ==
Chicago Police Officer Mike Biggs and elementary school teacher Molly Flynn meet at an Overeaters Anonymous meeting, starting a casual relationship that becomes more serious throughout the first season. Mike initially lives in a one-bedroom apartment and often visits his cantankerous, divorced mother, Peggy. Molly and her sister, Victoria, live in the Chicago home owned by their widowed mother, Joyce. The Flynn household soon adds Joyce's boyfriend and later husband, Vince. Mike and his best friend Carl, also an officer with the Chicago PD, frequently eat breakfast at Abe's Diner, where they befriend their Senegalese waiter, Samuel. The series follows the various stages of Mike and Molly's relationship, from couplehood to engagement to marriage, all while dealing with their challenging relatives and friends as well as Molly's career changes.

== Cast ==
- Billy Gardell as Officer Michael "Mike" Biggs, a Chicago police officer attempting to lose weight. He doesn't appear to be a deep thinker, but he is good-hearted and humorous. He often caves in to his mother's demands, much to Molly's dismay, but his relationship with Molly has made him much more independent.
- Melissa McCarthy as Molly Flynn, a fourth-grade teacher at Walter Payton Elementary School, also attempting to lose weight. She is cheerful, good-hearted, and quite intelligent. She is the most rational member of her family, but is known to have a quick temper and has built up much debt from lavish shopping and traveling. When she and Mike finally marry, she keeps Flynn as her last name, and they spend much of their time trying to get pregnant. She quits her teaching job in Season 4 to become a writer.
- Reno Wilson as Officer Carlton "Carl" McMillan, a Chicago police officer and Mike's partner and best friend. He tends towards self-pity, owing to his mother abandoning him. He lived with his grandmother for a long time until she made him move into his own apartment. He struggles in relationships with women and is depicted as lonely. He is a big fan of soul and gospel music and openly dislikes bluegrass. In Season 2 he had a steady relationship with Christina (Holly Robinson Peete), a single mother with a young son, but in Season 3 Christina broke up with Carl to try to work things out with James, her famous football player ex-husband and her son's father. He began a relationship with Victoria at the end of Season 4, but by the end of Season 5, it was over until they got back together in the series finale.
- Katy Mixon as Victoria Flynn, Molly's dimwitted, kindhearted, party-girl sister who is often high on marijuana and sleeping around with multiple men. She is employed as a funeral home beautician. At the end of Season 4 she began a relationship with Carl which ended badly in Season 5 but they got back together in the series finale.
- Swoosie Kurtz as Joyce Flynn-Moranto, mother of Molly and Victoria. Widowed when her daughters were young, she began dating Vincent Moranto in Season 1. She is very modern and attempts to stay youthful; she also drinks heavily and has a hair-trigger temper. As of the Season 3 episode "Thanksgiving Is Cancelled", she is married to Vincent.
- Nyambi Nyambi as Babatunde, aka Samuel, a sarcastic waiter at Abe's, the restaurant where Mike and Carl eat. He is also a close friend to Mike, Carl, and eventually Molly. He is from Senegal and often refers to the suffering in his home country, so he cannot easily sympathize with his restaurant patrons' "petty" problems. He and Carl became roommates in Season 3. In Season 5, Samuel's real name is revealed to be Babatunde when he becomes the new owner of Abe's Diner, since renamed Abe's Hot Beef.
- Louis Mustillo as Vincent "Vince" Moranto, Joyce's on/off boyfriend, then fiancé, and later her husband which makes him Molly and Victoria's stepfather. A widower, he tends to be flirty, chauvinistic, and sarcastic. A high-school dropout, he's not the most intelligent, but he cares deeply for Joyce and has shown fatherly care toward Molly and Victoria—despite having met Molly after being set up on a blind date with her, and his constant comments about Victoria's breasts. He once married a much older, very unpleasant woman from whom he fled after borrowing $2,000; he didn't officially end this marriage until the truth came out and Joyce kicked him out of her house until Mike convinced the "wife" to sign divorce papers.
- Rondi Reed as Margaret "Peggy" Biggs, Mike's mother. She is very controlling and traditional, as well as grumpy and cranky. She often refers to her ex-husband Jack leaving her and running away to Florida with a prostitute. Peggy is also very fussy over her dog Jim (a Brussels Griffon mix), whom she treats more like a son than a pet. In Season 2, Peggy began working as a lunch lady at the elementary school where Molly teaches. In Season 3, she dates a police captain who is Mike's supervisor, but Peggy breaks things off during the season finale.
- Cleo King as Rosetta McMillan (regular, seasons 1–3; recurring, seasons 4–5; guest, season 6), Carl's grandmother. She is very traditional and has professed deep love for her grandson, but is outwardly annoyed by Carl's behavior and made him move out in Season 3, saying she still loves him and looks forward to him visiting but wants him to finally become a responsible adult on his own. She has a big heart and treats Mike, who calls her "Nana", like a second grandson. She often gives Mike and Carl advice (mostly regarding relationships with women).
- David Anthony Higgins as Harry (regular, seasons 3–6; recurring, season 2; guest, season 1), a friend of Mike and Molly's who attends the same Overeaters Anonymous meetings. He is nice, but socially awkward and tends to say whatever he is thinking, even thoughts that make him seem pathetic. He was shown to have an almost obsessive crush on Victoria; when she finally kissed him in season 3, he realized that he is gay.
- Suzie Q as Jim, Peggy's dog, it is a Griffon Bruxellois mixed with a Chihuahua.

== Episodes ==
Season	Episodes	Originally released		Rank	Average viewers (in millions)
Season	Episodes	First released	Last released	Rank	Average viewers (in millions)
1	24	September 20, 2010	May 16, 2011	35	11.14
2	23	September 26, 2011	May 14, 2012	31	11.51
3	23	September 24, 2012	May 30, 2013	37	10.22
4	22	November 4, 2013	May 19, 2014	33	9.58
5	22	December 8, 2014	May 18, 2015	44	9.91
6	13	January 6, 2016	May 16, 2016	51	8.46

== Production ==
In December 2009, CBS placed a pilot order for Mike & Molly. Mark Roberts wrote the pilot, which was directed by James Burrows, with both Roberts and Burrows serving as executive producers alongside Chuck Lorre, Don Foster and the production companies Chuck Lorre Productions and Warner Bros. Television.

On May 13, 2010, CBS placed a series order on Mike and Molly. On May 15, 2011, Mike and Molly was renewed for a second season. On March 14, 2012, CBS renewed Mike & Molly for a third season, which premiered on September 24, 2012. CBS pulled the third season finale, titled "Windy City", from its show of May 20, 2013. The episode featured a tornado descending on Chicago, and would have been broadcast the same day as the 2013 Moore tornado. The episode was rescheduled for May 30, 2013.

On March 27, 2013, CBS announced that Mike & Molly would return for a fourth season during the 2013–2014 television season. On May 17, 2013, Mark Roberts stepped down from showrunner duties to focus on other projects. Al Higgins replaced him for Season 4. The series received a 22-episode order from CBS for its 4th season. The show's fourth season premiere took place on November 4, 2013 at 9:00 pm ET/8:00 pm CT, in the time slot vacated by 2 Broke Girls when it moved to 8:30 pm ET/7:30 pm CT, replacing the canceled sitcom, We Are Men. Following the breakout feature film success of McCarthy (Identity Thief, The Heat), Lorre intended for the show to more prominently feature her in season 4. In promos leading up to the season 4 premiere, CBS billed the series as "the new Mike & Molly." Though the cast and setting remains essentially the same, the "new" refers to Molly quitting her teaching job and pursuing a career as a writer.

On March 13, 2014, CBS announced the fifth season renewal of Mike & Molly. CBS did not place the show in a timeslot when it unveiled its initial 2014-15 schedule. The fifth season began airing December 8, 2014.

On March 12, 2015, CBS announced the sixth season renewal of Mike & Molly.

On January 12, 2016, it was announced that the series would end after six seasons. The series finale aired on May 16, 2016.

=== Casting ===
Casting announcements began in February 2010, with Katy Mixon and Reno Wilson being the first actors cast in the series. Mixon portrays the role of Victoria, Molly's sister, while Wilson portrays Carl, Mike's partner. Billy Gardell was the next actor cast in the series, as the titular Mike. Swoosie Kurtz then joined the series as Molly's mother, Joyce. Following Kurtz, Nyambi Nyambi boarded the series as Samuel, a regular waiter at Abe's Hot Beef, where Mike and Carl frequent. Melissa McCarthy completed the cast when she signed on to play the role of Molly.

== Reception ==
=== Ratings ===
Season	Time slot (ET)	Episodes	Premiered		Ended		TV season	Rank	Viewers (in millions)
Season	Time slot (ET)	Episodes	Date	Viewers (in millions)	Date	Viewers (in millions)	TV season	Rank	Viewers (in millions)
1	Monday 9:30 pm	24	September 20, 2010	12.23	May 16, 2011	8.64	2010–11	35th	11.14
2	Monday 9:30 pm	23	September 26, 2011	13.86	May 14, 2012	11.79	2011–12	31st	11.51
3	Monday 9:30 pm	23	September 24, 2012	9.45	May 30, 2013	8.01	2012–13	37th	10.22
4	Monday 9:00 pm	22	November 4, 2013	9.22	May 19, 2014	7.05	2013–14	33rd	9.58
5	Monday 8:30 pm	22	December 8, 2014	8.06	May 18, 2015	7.75	2014–15	44th	9.91
6	Wednesday 8:30 pm (1-6); Monday 8:00 pm (7-13)	13	January 6, 2016	6.73	May 16, 2016	8.45	2015–16	51st	8.46

=== Critical reception ===
Mike & Molly has received moderately positive reviews from critics. On Rotten Tomatoes, the show holds a rating of 69% with an average rating of 5.46/10, based on 29 reviews. The consensus reads: "Mike & Molly is a conventional sitcom that's able to mine some big laughs, thanks to the immensely appealing central performers". On Metacritic it has a score of 62 out of 100 based on 23 reviews, indicating "generally favorable reviews". Critic Randee Dawn gave the show a negative review, stating the cast is likable, but the jokes are old and bland.

=== Accolades ===
Awards
Year	Award	Category	Recipients	Result
2011	People's Choice Awards	Favorite New TV Comedy		Nominated
2011	Primetime Emmy Awards	Outstanding Lead Actress in a Comedy Series	Melissa McCarthy	Won
2011	Primetime Creative Arts Emmy Awards	Outstanding Art Direction For A Multi-Camera Series		Nominated
2011	Satellite Awards	Best Actress – Television Series Musical or Comedy	Melissa McCarthy	Nominated
2012	Primetime Emmy Awards	Outstanding Lead Actress in a Comedy Series	Melissa McCarthy	Nominated
2012	Primetime Creative Arts Emmy Awards	Outstanding Cinematography For A Multi-Camera Series		Nominated
2012	Primetime Creative Arts Emmy Awards	Outstanding Art Direction For A Multi-Camera Series		Nominated
2012	Young Artist Awards	Best Performance in a TV Series – Guest Starring Young Actor 18–21	Ryan Malgarini	Won
2012	1st PAAFTJ Television Awards	Best Actress in a Comedy Series	Melissa McCarthy	Nominated
2013	Primetime Creative Arts Emmy Awards	Outstanding Cinematography For A Multi-Camera Series		Nominated
2014	People's Choice Awards	Favorite Comedic TV Actress	Melissa McCarthy	Nominated
2014	Primetime Emmy Awards	Outstanding Lead Actress in a Comedy Series	Melissa McCarthy	Nominated
2014	Primetime Creative Arts Emmy Awards	Outstanding Cinematography For A Multi-Camera Series		Nominated
2015	People's Choice Awards	Favorite Comedic TV Actress	Melissa McCarthy	Nominated
2015	Primetime Creative Arts Emmy Awards	Outstanding Cinematography For A Multi-Camera Series		Won
2015	Primetime Creative Arts Emmy Awards	Outstanding Multi-Camera Picture Editing For A Comedy Series		Nominated
2016	People's Choice Awards	Favorite Network TV Comedy		Nominated
2016	People's Choice Awards	Favorite Comedic TV Actress	Melissa McCarthy	Won

== Controversies ==
=== Body shaming ===
Controversy arose in 2010 around a Marie Claire blog post written by Maura Kelly, in which she refers to the actors on the show as "fatties", questioned if Mike & Molly was endorsing obesity, and also says she would be repulsed by the sight of overweight actors kissing. Show creator Mark Roberts spoke out regarding Kelly's blog post, calling the comments "very high school". He also stated, "This wasn't about the show, this wasn't about the writing, this wasn't about the acting. This was about someone's hateful response to how these two human beings look." Billy Gardell also addressed the matter when he appeared on the daily talk show The Talk on November 1, 2010. Marie Claire has stood behind the blog. Kelly subsequently stated she "would like to apologize for the insensitive things I've said" and "sorely regret that it upset people so much".

=== Native American dialogue controversy ===
In the season 3 episode "Molly's New Shoes", the character Peggy reacts to her fiancé's plans to retire and move to Arizona with the line "Arizona? Why should I go to Arizona? It's nothing but a furnace full of drunk Indians." This prompted calls by the Native American Journalists Association, among others, for an apology.

== Broadcast ==
The series airs in Canada on CTV, CTV Two, City, and M3 from September 20, 2010. In the United Kingdom and Ireland it aired on Comedy Central UK from October 4, 2010 and reran on Channel 4 from September 10, 2018. From January 14 2026, TLC UK has been the home of Mike & Molly in the UK & Ireland. February 9, 2011 was the premiere for Nine Network in Australia. New Zealand's TV2 started it from April 29, 2011 and since March 2023 it has been airing on TV One at 4.30pm weekdays. In South Africa the show started on M-Net from April 8, 2011.

=== Syndication ===
The off-network rights to Mike & Molly were sold to FX in 2012 and aired from 2014 until 2021. In 2021, the syndication rights to Mike and Molly were sold to Nick at Nite. The block premiered the series on October 5, 2021. It also premiered on sister channels TV Land on October 15, 2021 and CMT that same month, airing until 2025.

The series began airing in off-network syndication on NBC, CBS, ABC, Fox, The CW, MyNetworkTV, and independent stations across the country in the fall of 2014.

== Home media ==
In the United States, the first season of Mike and Molly was released on both DVD and Blu-ray. All subsequent seasons have only received a DVD release. On October 11, 2016, the sixth and final season was released, as well as a complete series collection. In Australia, the first four seasons have been released on DVD, and in the United Kingdom, only seasons one and two have been released.

Mike & Molly home media releases
Title	Episodes	Release date		
Title	Episodes	Region 1	Region 2	Region 4
The Complete First Season	24	September 20, 2011	February 6, 2012	October 5, 2011
The Complete Second Season	23	August 21, 2012	September 24, 2012	October 17, 2012
The Complete Third Season	23	August 20, 2013	TBA	October 23, 2013
The Complete Fourth Season	22	September 30, 2014	TBA	December 3, 2014
The Complete Fifth Season	22	August 18, 2015	TBA	TBA
The Complete Sixth & Final Season	13	October 11, 2016	TBA	TBA
The Complete Series	127	October 11, 2016	TBA	TBA

== See also ==
- Bob Hearts Abishola
