= Monopoly Millionaires' Club =

Series of lottery games

Monopoly Millionaires' Club (MMC) was a U.S. multi-state lottery drawing game coordinated by the Multi-State Lottery Association (MUSL), using the Monopoly board game brand under license from Hasbro. Players of the game could become eligible to be flown to Las Vegas to take part in an episode of the Monopoly Millionaires' Club game show.

The draw game was unsuccessful, and ended after only three months. Ticket sales for the draw game began on October 19, 2014, in 22 states and the District of Columbia, with the first drawing held on October 24. In December, after the Texas Lottery pulled out of the game, the remaining participants voted to suspend Monopoly Millionaires' Club after the December 26 draw. The draw game was plagued by low ticket sales, along with concerns that the game was, with its multiple components, too complicated for players to understand.

The Monopoly Millionaires' Club game show was unaffected by the suspension of the draw game; it premiered in syndication on March 28, 2015; that month, it was announced that the MMC name would be revived as a series of scratchcard games (prizes varied by lottery jurisdiction); 16 lotteries offered a scratch‑off game with the same $5 price point as the draw game. The game show's final episode was shown on April 30, 2016.

== Original draw game ==
Monopoly Millionaires' Club drawings occurred on Friday nights; each play cost $5, with multiple plays printed on separate tickets. To win the jackpot, players had to match five numbers from 1 through 52 in the main field, and a randomly generated sixth number from 1 through 28 that represented a property from the U.S. edition Monopoly game board (22 streets, 4 railroads, and 2 utilities). Jackpots started at $15 million, and were to be capped at $25 million until won. An MMC jackpot winner also received a custom top hat, resembling that worn by Mr. Monopoly.

In addition to the five regular numbers plus the property, each ticket contained a 12-digit "Millionaires' Club Number"; in the event that the jackpot was won, additional $1 million raffle-style prizes were drawn from the Millionaires' Club numbers. A minimum of 10 were to be drawn for a $15 million jackpot; at least two were added per "rollover", so that a capped $25 million jackpot would have at least 16 additional cash millionaires if that jackpot was hit.

Tickets also contained a 25-character alphanumeric code that could be used to add the ticket's property to a virtual game board on the Monopoly Millionaires' Club website. Collecting certain sets of properties, such as Boardwalk and Park Place, awarded players a varying number of entries towards a chance to attend a taping of the Monopoly Millionaires' Club game show.

== Draw game prizes and odds ==
| Matches | Prize | Odds of winning |
|---|---|---|
| 2 numbers; no Property | $5 | 1 in 16.62 |
| Property only | $7 | 1 in 47.44 |
| 1 number plus Property | $10 | 1 in 81.60 |
| 3 numbers; no Property | $20 | 1 in 249.33 |
| 2 numbers plus Property | $25 | 1 in 448.79 |
| 3 numbers plus Property | $250 | 1 in 6,731.81 |
| 4 numbers; no Property | $500 | 1 in 11,469.01 |
| 4 numbers plus Property | $20,000 | 1 in 309,663.32 |
| 5 numbers; no Property | $100,000 | 1 in 2,695,217.78 |
| 5 numbers plus Property | Jackpot | 1 in 72,770,880.00 |
| Millionaires' Club Number† | $1,000,000 | Varies |

† Drawn only if jackpot was won. Ten "Club" numbers were to be drawn if a $15 million jackpot was won; a minimum of 16 were to be chosen with a $25 million (capped) jackpot.

Overall odds of winning any prize were approximately 1 in 10. The only jackpot win occurred during its third drawing (November 7, 2014), in which a player from New Jersey won $21 million. The first $25 million MMC jackpot drawing was the game's seventh, on December 5.

== Draw game participants ==
Twenty-two states and the District of Columbia participated in the launch of Monopoly Millionaires' Club; nine states were to join the draw game in 2015.

- Arizona
- Arkansas
- District of Columbia
- Florida
- Georgia
- Indiana
- Iowa
- Kentucky
- Maine
- Maryland
- Michigan
- Minnesota
- Missouri
- New Hampshire
- New Jersey
- New Mexico
- New York
- North Carolina
- Pennsylvania
- Rhode Island
- South Dakota
- Tennessee
- Texas (suspended sales following the December 12, 2014 drawing)

=== Where to join draw game in 2015 ===
- California
- Idaho
- Kansas
- North Dakota°
- Ohio
- Vermont
- Virginia
- West Virginia (January 10)
- Wisconsin

° North Dakota state law prohibits one-state games and scratch tickets; as such, North Dakota was eligible to join the draw game, but was prohibited from offering the MMC scratchcard.

=== Suspension of draw game ===
On December 11, 2014, the Texas Lottery announced that it would suspend its participation in Monopoly Millionaires' Club after the December 12 draw. Also on December 12, the remaining MMC members followed suit, voting to suspend the game following its December 26 draw; only 10 drawings were held in total. The suspension came in response to low ticket sales for the game: critics felt that the $5 tickets were too expensive, and prior to the first MMC drawing, a writer for The Philadelphia Inquirer expressed concerns that the game was too confusing, citing the "Club" bonus prize system and the property collection for game show entries. Sales of tickets were strongest per capita in Pennsylvania.

== Scratchcard games ==
On March 10, 2015, MUSL announced that the MMC lottery game would be revived for a series of scratchcard games, where players could, as with the failed draw game, win the opportunity to participate in a Monopoly Millionaires' Club game show taping.
