= Alex Hernandez =

Alex Hernandez may refer to:

- Alex Hernández (baseball) (born 1977), Puerto Rican former Major League Baseball player
- Alex Hernández (tennis) (born 1999), Mexican tennis player
- Alex Hernandez (writer) (born 1978), Cuban-American writer of indie webcomics
- Alexander Hernandez (born 1992), American mixed martial artist
- Alex Hernandez (actor) (born 1989), actor in the TV series Hemlock Grove
- Alex Hernandez, Chilean-American death metal drummer with the bands Immolation and Requiem Aeternam
