= Bolden =

- Film poster
- Directed by: Dan Pritzker
- Written by: Daniel Pritzker; David N. Rothschild
- Produced by: Jonathan Cornick; Michele Tayler
- Starring: Gary Carr; Erik LaRay Harvey; Ian McShane; Michael Rooker; Yaya DaCosta; Reno Wilson; Robert Ri'chard; Breon Pugh
- Cinematography: Neal Norton
- Edited by: Thomas J. Nordberg; Chris Steele-Nicholson
- Music by: Wynton Marsalis; Mark Isham; Scott Steiner
- Production company: King Bolden LLC
- Distributed by: Abramorama
- Release date: May 3, 2019
- Running time: 101 minutes
- Country: United States
- Language: English

Bolden is a 2019 American drama film based on the life of cornetist Buddy Bolden (1877–1931). One of the seminal figures in jazz history, Bolden left no surviving recordings, having been committed in 1907 at age 30 to the Louisiana State Insane Asylum, where he spent the rest of his life after a diagnosis of acute alcoholic psychosis.

The musical drama is directed by Daniel Pritzker, and features original music written, arranged and performed by Wynton Marsalis. The film stars Gary Carr as Bolden, and co-stars Erik LaRay Harvey, Reno Wilson, Yaya DaCosta, Ian McShane and Michael Rooker.

The score by Marsalis includes vocalists Catherine Russell, Brianna Thomas, Don Vappie, and instrumentalists including Wycliffe Gordon, Victor Goines, Marcus Printup, and others. The film contains performances by Reno Wilson playing Louis Armstrong (acting and singing).

Bolden was released in theaters on May 3, 2019, by Abramorama.

== Cast ==
- Gary Carr as Charles "Buddy" Bolden
- Erik LaRay Harvey as Bartley
- Ian McShane as Judge Leander Perry
- Michael Rooker as Pat McMurphy
- Yaya DaCosta as Nora Bolden
- Reno Wilson as Louis Armstrong
- Robert Ri'chard as George Baquet
- Karimah Westbrook as Alice Bolden
- Breon Pugh as Willie Warner
- Ser'Darius Blain as Willie Cornish

== Reception ==
On review aggregator website Rotten Tomatoes, the film holds an approval rating of 70% based on 10 reviews, with an average rating of 7.5/10. On Metacritic, the film has a weighted average score of 50 out of 100, based on 10 critics, indicating "mixed or average" reviews.
