= Timothy Renouf =

British actor

- Pronunciation: Ren-oof or Ren-uff
- Born: Jersey
- Other names: Timothy Christopher De Jersey Renouf
- Education: Victoria College
- Alma mater: Exeter University
- Occupation: Actor
- Height: 6 ft 3 in (191 cm)

Timothy Renouf is a British actor, writer and former model, who played John Hammond in the Guinness advertisement titled John Hammond, Intolerant Champion (2015), Charlie in Goldbricks in Bloom (2016), and Freddie in Here Comes Hell (2019). In 2021 he played Peter Combe in A Very British Scandal, Max in Afterlife of the Party, and portrayed Siegfried Sassoon in The Laureate.

== Biography ==
Timothy Renouf was born in Jersey, the second of three brothers. He attended St Georges Preparatory School before being educated at Victoria College, and left to study Drama at Exeter University. Soon after graduating he was scouted outside Covent Garden tube station by Elite Models and began his catwalk career modelling for Alexander McQueen, Burberry, Missoni, Thom Browne, Moncler, and Hackett. His career in acting has included work in television, film and theatre. In 2015, he featured with Lianne La Havas and played John Hammond in the Guinness advertisement titled John Hammond, Intolerant Champion, directed by Jake Nava. He later played Florence Welch's lover in the music video for Ship to Wreck. In 2016 he went on to act in indie feature Goldbricks In Bloom directed by friend and long standing co-creator Danny Sangra. After performing in the 2018 Killer Weekend (FUBAR) opposite Mark Heap, the following year he featured in Here Comes Hell, which premiered at the Arrow Video FrightFest. He played 'Max' in the 2021 Netflix romcom Afterlife of the Party, and in the historical drama A Very British Scandal he performed opposite Claire Foy and Paul Bettany. In the same year he portrayed Siegfried Sassoon in The Laureate.

== Filmography ==
	Title	Role	Notes
2015	John Hammond, Intolerant Champion	John Hammond	
2015	Frankenstein and the Vampyre	Percy Bysshe Shelley	
2015	Set The Thames on Fire	Jimmy Dean	
2015	Florence + The Machine - Ship to Wreck	Lover	
2016	Goldbricks in Bloom	Charlie	
2016	Guilt	Chris	
2018	On The Edge	Jonny	
2018	Killer Weekend (FUBAR)	Myles	
	Genius: Picasso	Andre Beaudin	
2020	Shakespeare & Hathaway: Private Investigators	Rufus Hortensio	
2019	Here Comes Hell	Freddie	
2021	A Very British Scandal	Peter Combe	
2021	Afterlife of the Party	Max	
2021	The Laureate	Siegfried Sassoon	
2023	The Doombusters Near Miss	William Buxton Dave	
2024	Polly Goes Metal	Joe	
2025	Bergerac	Julien Wakefield	
