= Goldbricks in Bloom =

- Film poster
- Directed by: Danny Sangra
- Written by: Danny Sangra
- Produced by: Matt Flanders
- Starring: Waris Ahluwalia; Leo Fitzpatrick; Tavi Gevinson; Jake Hoffman; Adelind Horan; Evan Jonigkeit; Zosia Mamet; Timothy Renouf
- Cinematography: Andrew DeFrancesco
- Edited by: Danny Sangra
- Production companies: Constance Fry Pictures; Control Films; In Your Face Entertainment
- Release date: November 17, 2016
- Running time: 93 minutes
- Country: United States
- Language: English

Goldbricks in Bloom is a 2016 American comedy film written and directed by Danny Sangra and starring Waris Ahluwalia, Leo Fitzpatrick, Tavi Gevinson, Jake Hoffman, Adelind Horan, Evan Jonigkeit, Zosia Mamet and Timothy Renouf. The film premiered on November 17, 2016, in Los Angeles and online through Vimeo.

== Cast ==
- Waris Ahluwalia as Christopher
- Kat Clements as Julia
- Margaret Clunie as Jess
- Peter Davis as Scott
- Leo Fitzpatrick as Otis
- Tavi Gevinson as Calvin's Ex
- Sam Hamill as Calvin
- Jake Hoffman as Miles
- Adelind Horan as Maripol
- Evan Jonigkeit as Joe
- Zosia Mamet as Cleo
- Carson Meyer as Ella
- Timothy Renouf as Charlie
