= High (play) =

2010 American play

- Playbill cover from the 2011 Broadway production
- Original language: English
- Written by: Matthew Lombardo
- Characters: Sister Jamison Connelly; Father Michael Delpapp; Cody Randall
- Subject: Religion, homosexuality, drug use
- Genre: Drama

Premiere
- Date: March 25, 2011
- Place: TheaterWorks, Hartford, Connecticut
- Official website

High is a 2010 American play written by Matthew Lombardo. The story revolves around a nun, Sister Jamison Connelly, who deals with her sordid past and the people around her with her acerbic wit and wisdom. When Sister Jamison agrees to sponsor a gay 19-year-old drug user and hustler in an effort to help him combat his addiction, her own faith is ultimately tested. HIGH explores the universal themes of truth, forgiveness, redemption and human fallibility.

== Production history ==
High had its world premiere in the summer of 2010 at Hartford's TheaterWorks, where director Rob Ruggiero had been a longtime associate artistic director, as well as author Matthew Lombardo, who was born in Hartford and raised in Wethersfield. The show, which had commercial attachments and Broadway ambitions, then traveled to Cincinnati's Playhouse in the Park, followed by a run at the Repertory Theater of St. Louis. Kathleen Turner and Evan Jonigkeit played Sister Jamison and Cody Randall, while Michael Berresse portrayed Father Michael Delpapp. Reviews were mostly positive in the out-of-town tryouts.

High opened in previews on Broadway at the Booth Theatre on March 25, 2011, with an official opening night on April 19, 2011. Turner and Jonigkeit remained in their respective roles, and Stephen Kunken replaced Berresse in the role of Father Michael Delpapp. Despite some critical praise, mainly for Jonigkeit and Turner's performances, it was otherwise critically savaged and, coupled with low advance sales, closed on April 24, 2011, after 28 previews and 8 regular performances (making it the shortest-running production of the 2010-2011 Broadway season).

== Synopsis ==
Sister Jamison Connelly is an acerbic and profanity-inclined nun and drug counselor with a checkered past of her own. She herself is a former drug user and alcoholic whose promiscuity caused her sister's tragic death. Her employer, Father Michael Delpapp, introduces her to Cody Randall, a 19-year-old gay drug user and hustler, hoping that Randall can be reformed. Sister Jamison is left to stop Cody from self-destructing with his crystal meth addiction and to confront her own past. Various plot twists reveal that Father Michael is Cody's uncle and that he has been enabling him financially for years. This support culminated in a cover-up of Cody's murdering his 14-year-old lover. At first resistant, Cody eventually begins to take to Sister Jamison's unconventional approach to religion, but he relapses into drug abuse and a life of crime. Sister Jamison, not knowing what to do, prays with Cody in a back alley and leaves him to die.

== Original Broadway cast ==
- Kathleen Turner as Sister Jamison Connelly
- Stephen Kunken as Father Michael Delpapp
- Evan Jonigkeit as Cody Randall

== Awards and nominations ==
2011 Drama League Award

- Distinguished Performance Award - Kathleen Turner (nominated)

2011 Outer Critics Circle Awards

- Best Supporting Actor in a Play - Evan Jonigkeit (nominated)

2011 Connecticut Critics Circle Awards

- Outstanding Debut - Evan Jonigkeit (won)

2011 Kevin Kline Awards

- Best Supporting Actor in a Play - Evan Jonigkeit (won)

2011 IRNE Awards

- Best Supporting Actor in a Touring Play - Evan Jonigkeit (nominated)
