= Jenny Everywhere =

Open-source comic fictional character

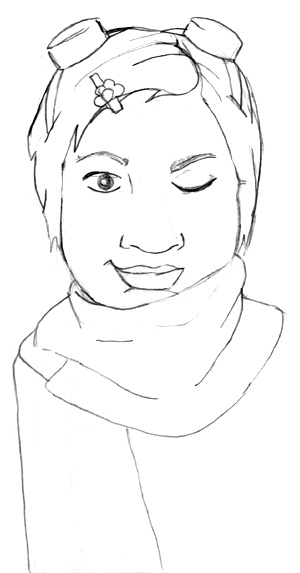
- The original sketched image of "The Shifter", released into the public domain by Steven Wintle.

Publication information
- First appearance: Early 2002
- Created by: Steven Wintle

In-story information
- Notable aliases: The Shifter

Jenny Everywhere, also known as "The Shifter", is an open-source, freely licensed character, created by Canadian comic book artist Steven Wintle. The character was co-developed by members of the Barbelith online community.

Jenny Everywhere was created when her creators could not find any other truly open-source or public domain characters. She is described both as existing in every reality and being able to shift between realities. This gives the character the ability to be inserted into the continuity of any existing or new work, such as various comics and webcomics. The concept may be extended to other media as well.

== Conception ==
On creating the character, Steven Wintle described her by saying:

She has short, dark hair. She usually wears aviation goggles on top of her head and a scarf around her neck. Otherwise, she dresses in comfortable clothes. She is average size and has a good body image. She has loads of confidence and charisma. She appears to be Asian or Native American. She has a ready smile.

He went on to describe her as "if Tintin listened to Le Tigre and joined the Fantastic Four. She's excitable, passionate, attentive, curious, and caring. Like Captain Marvel, she's just a really powerful kid." Jenny's creation was in part inspired by Octobriana.

On occasion, the character is genderswapped in some media, being often (but not always) named Jerry or Johnny Everywhere. In his second appearance, The Death of Jenny Everywhere, he was depicted as a transgender male, but this was not a widely adopted aspect of the character.

=== Licensing ===
The creators of the character insist that any work involving her must include the following text: "The character of Jenny Everywhere is available for use by anyone, with only one condition: This paragraph must be included in any publication involving Jenny Everywhere, that others might use this property as they wish. All rights reversed." This does not mean everything with Jenny Everywhere is free-use and uncopyrighted, and people may still maintain copyrights on their own unique characters and character styling, story, artwork, and title. The "All Rights Reversed" portion refers to the character's name, her characteristics, and the idea of the character is uncopyrightable, as Jenny Everywhere "belongs to everyone".

Being that Jenny Everywhere is a free-culture character with no official site or publication, it has been up to the creators of any story involving The Shifter to decide if they want to link to the continuity of other peoples' work or not. For example; in Alex Hernandez's story Soulless Mate, a prominent character is one of Jenny's boyfriends from the My Bloody Valentine story. In another writer's story, this connection may not have happened.

== Stories and appearances ==
Most of the stories for Jenny Everywhere exist strictly as webcomics, and many had a science fiction or superhero theme. In 2003, Nelson Evergreen and Joe Macaré had made a limited 50-unit self-publication of their stories, Name's Not Down and Damn Fine Hostile Takeover. The character of Jenny Everywhere has not been limited to independent stories, and she has appeared in a number of existing webcomics as cameos and crossovers.

Jenny appeared as a presenter for the 2008 Web Cartoonists' Choice Awards, presenting the category for Outstanding Character Rendering.

Several open source spin-off characters exist in the Jenny Everywhere universe, including:

- Laura Drake, who often has a close relationship with the Jenny of her universe, whether it is as friends, lovers, or even enemies.
- Jenny Nowhere, the "Anti-Shifter", who appears in widely different incarnations but keeps recurring as an antagonist.
- Jenny Somewhere, a clone of Jenny who has an imperfect replica of her powers that leaves her imperiled sometimes.
- Jenny Anywhere, a woman who can shift in dimensions but not time-travel and is a sometimes rival of Jenny Everywhere.
- Jimmy Wherever—also known as the Shiftee—a non-powered Canadian male who is Jenny's boyfriend and can jump realities by holding her hand.
- Jimmy Anytime, a clone of Jimmy Wherever who was created to capture Jenny Anywhere but eventually became her boyfriend.

=== Contests ===
There have been several one-time, single strips as well that have appeared as entries to Strip Fight contests. Strip Fight is a website that hosts bi-monthly contests in which people are invited to create a single comic strip, based on a given theme. Jenny Everywhere has been the subject of two different Strip Fight contests in 2004 and 2007.

In 2008, The Shifter Archive and WAGON Webcomic Battle ran a drawing contest on the subject of Jenny Everywhere. Entrants were to compete for one of three official Jenny Everywhere game cards to be used in the WAGON Webcomic Battle Trading Card Game. Third Place was awarded to Zack Holmes, whose card was placed within the Beta Deck. Second Place was awarded to Jacob Burrows, whose card was placed in the Alpha Deck. First place was awarded to Benj Christensen, whose card was deemed a Rare and Promotional Card. These cards have been put into print in November 2008.

=== Jenny Everywhere Day ===
Artists and storytellers create new works for the annual Jenny Everywhere Day on August 13. Organized by Benj Christensen in 2009, the event presents such standalone art, cameos in other works, and stories as the fan base has created.

Several works have established August 13 as Jenny's in-universe birthday.

== Critical response ==
After several complete webcomics and the original launch of jennyeverywhere.com, The Shifter received much praise in niche online communities. The character was recognized in the September 2003 issue of the Canadian publication of Exclaim!, which described the character as being "born in a colossal explosion of energy like many of her copyrighted cousins, but unlike Superman or the Hulk, she belongs wholly to the people."
