= The Peripheral (TV series) =

2022 American science-fiction television series

- Genre: Science fiction; Thriller
- Created by: Scott B. Smith
- Based on: The Peripheral by William Gibson
- Showrunner: Scott B. Smith
- Starring: Chloë Grace Moretz; Gary Carr; Jack Reynor; JJ Feild; T'Nia Miller; Louis Herthum; Katie Leung; Melinda Page Hamilton; Chris Coy; Alex Hernandez; Julian Moore-Cook; Adelind Horan; Austin Rising; Eli Goree; Charlotte Riley; Alexandra Billings
- Music by: Mark Korven
- Country of origin: United States
- Original language: English
- No. of seasons: 1
- No. of episodes: 8 (List of episodes)

Production
- Executive producers: Jonathan Nolan; Lisa Joy; Scott B. Smith; Vincenzo Natali; Athena Wickham; Greg Plageman; James W. Skotchdopole; Steven Hoban
- Producers: Jamie Chan; Halle Phillips; Noreen O'Toole; Jay Worth; Sara Desmond
- Production locations: London, England; Marshall, North Carolina
- Cinematography: Stuart Howell
- Editors: Andrew Groves; Asher Pink
- Running time: 55–73 minutes
- Production companies: Kilter Films; Copperheart Entertainment; Amazon Studios; Warner Bros. Television

Original release
- Network: Amazon Prime Video
- Release: October 21 – December 2, 2022

The Peripheral is an American science fiction television series created by Scott B. Smith. Produced by Amazon, it is loosely based on the 2014 book written by William Gibson. Westworld creators Jonathan Nolan and Lisa Joy serve as executive producers, along with Athena Wickham, Steve Hoban, and Vincenzo Natali. Set in the years 2032 and 2099, with new technology that has changed society in subtle ways, a gamer is delivered a connection to an alternate reality as well as a dark future of her own.

The series had its world premiere on October 11, 2022, at the Ace Hotel in Los Angeles, before its debut on October 21, 2022, on Amazon Prime Video. In February 2023, the series was renewed for a second season. In August 2023, the series was canceled by Amazon Prime Video due to the extended duration of the 2023 SAG-AFTRA strike and the 2023 Writers Guild of America strike.

== Cast ==
=== Main ===
- Chloë Grace Moretz as Flynne Fisher
- Gary Carr as Wilf Netherton
- Jack Reynor as Burton Fisher
- JJ Feild as Lev Zubov
- T'Nia Miller as Cherise Nuland
- Louis Herthum as Corbell Pickett
- Katie Leung as Ash
- Melinda Page Hamilton as Ella Fisher
- Chris Coy as Jasper Baker
- Alex Hernandez as Tommy Constantine
- Julian Moore-Cook as Ossian
- Adelind Horan as Billy Ann Baker
- Austin Rising as Leon
- Eli Goree as Conner Penske
- Charlotte Riley as Aelita West
- Alexandra Billings as Inspector Ainsley Lowbeer

=== Recurring ===
- David Hoflin as Daniel
- Hannah Arterton as Dee Dee
- India Mullen as Mary Pickett
- Miles Barrow as Macon
- Gavin Dunn as Edward
- Moe Bar-El as Reece
- Chuku Modu as Carlos
- Harrison Gilbertson as Atticus
- Duke Davis Roberts as Cash
- Claire Cooper as Dominika Zubov
- Poppy Corby-Tuech as Mariel Raphael
- Amber Rose Revah as Grace Hogart
- Ned Dennehy as Bob
- Ben Dickey as Sheriff Jackman
- Anjli Mohindra as Beatrice

== Production ==
=== Development ===
In April 2018, a TV series adaptation of William Gibson's novel The Peripheral was announced by Westworld creators Lisa Joy and Jonathan Nolan for Amazon with a script-to-series commitment. It was announced in April 2019 that Joy and Nolan had signed a first look overall deal worth around $20 million a year at Amazon Studios, and the project received a series order in the middle of November 2019, with Joy and Nolan executive producing under their overall deal. Beyond Joy and Nolan, executive producers include Athena Wickham, Steve Hoban, and Vincenzo Natali. The show has hour-long episodes, developed by Kilter Films, through Amazon Studios. Warner Bros. Television is also co-financier and producer, with Scott Smith as writer. Smith created the series, while also serving as showrunner and executive producer. Natali directed the show's pilot. On March 30, 2021, Greg Plageman joined the series as executive producer and replaced Smith as showrunner.

The series' first season had a budget of around $175 million.

In February 2023, Amazon Prime Video renewed the series for a second season. On August 18, 2023, the second season of The Peripheral was scrapped due to the 2023 SAG-AFTRA strike.

=== Casting ===
In October 2020, it was announced that Chloë Grace Moretz was cast in the lead role of Flynne Fisher, with Gary Carr also joining the main cast. In March 2021, Jack Reynor joined the series in a main role. The following month, Eli Goree, Charlotte Riley, JJ Feild, Adelind Horan, T'Nia Miller, and Alex Hernandez were added to the main cast. In June 2021, Louis Herthum, Chris Coy, Melinda Page Hamilton, Katie Leung, and Austin Rising joined the cast in recurring roles. In July 2021, Alexandra Billings joined the cast in a recurring role.

=== Filming ===
Principal photography for the series began on May 3, 2021, in London, England. Filming moved to Marshall, North Carolina on September 24. Production on the series wrapped on November 5, 2021.

== Episodes ==
| No. | Title | Directed by | Written by | Original release date |
|---|---|---|---|---|
| 1 | "Pilot" | Vincenzo Natali | Scott B. Smith | October 21, 2022 |
In 2032, Flynne Fisher, a young woman in North Carolina with a knack for Virtual Reality (VR) games, scrounges for cash to pay for medication for her mother, Ella, whom she helps take care of with her brother, Burton. A mysterious company from Colombia, called Milagros Coldiron, sends a prototype for an advanced headset that takes Flynne to an ultra-realistic SIM world in a body that looks like Burton's. While in the world, Flynne is guided by a voice and is sent to a Research Institute (RI) party to seduce and kidnap a woman named Mariel, who is brought to the woman, Aelita West, who guided Flynne. On Flynne's second visit, she wakes up on an operating table for a procedure to receive one of Mariel's eyes, which they use to access data in a secured building. After Flynne dies in the SIM world, someone from the company contacts her to tell her that her life is in danger. Her brother laughs it off until their drones spot an elite hit squad approaching.
| 2 | "Empathy Bonus" | Vincenzo Natali | Scott B. Smith | October 21, 2022 |
Flynne relies on her brother and his ex-military friends to fend off mercenary bounty hunters that storm her property at night. Flynne learns from Wilfred Netherton that she is not playing a SIM but rather piloting a robot (Peripheral) via quantum tunneling in a version of London 70 years in the future; she now has a Peripheral that matches her body. She asks questions of a powerful man, Lev Zubov, and learns that she lives in a parallel timeline ("stub") that was created when someone from their timeline first contacted her timeline. Zubov asks Flynne to help them find Aelita West, whom they were paying for access to Flynne's stub; Flynne refuses to cooperate until her mom starts to get better. Back in 2032, the local authorities start to investigate, and criminal businessman Corbell gets hired to take down Flynne and her brother.
| 3 | "Haptic Drift" | Alrick Riley | Scott B. Smith | October 28, 2022 |
Flynne spends more time controlling her Peripheral in the future and gets closer to Wilf; they even kiss in front of the police to avoid being detained. Flynne starts experiencing something similar to "haptic drift", something her brother was trained to resist, after his squad was neurologically linked for combat. They search for Aelita, solving a riddle she gave to her mother pertaining to her current whereabouts. When they show up at her hideout, only a couple of defunct Peripherals are left. Daniel shows up with a koid (a bipedal robot), but they lose the fight to Wilf and Flynne.
| 4 | "Jackpot" | Alrick Riley | Story by : Bronwyn Garrity; Teleplay by : Scott B. Smith | November 4, 2022 |
Flynne has a seizure and stays away from using the new headset. Conner goes in her place, but is disconnected. When Flynne returns, polt hackers have to hold the connection while she enters "Explorer mode" and starts to wander. Ash and Wilf lead her to a cemetery where, at the end of the episode, details are revealed about "the Jackpot", an apocalyptic event occurring in the near future of Flynne's time that started with blackouts across North America, then pandemic, then a population collapse from environmental failure, and later, a nuclear explosion in North Carolina.
| 5 | "What About Bob?" | Vincenzo Natali | Jamie Chan | November 11, 2022 |
One year before Aelita's disappearance, she meets with an ex-lover, Dr. Grace Hogart, who shows Aelita some of her company's experiments in a stub. Back in 2032, Bob is introduced as a cold-blooded killer, a retired Irish assassin living in Florida. He is hired by Daniel's bot from the future to take out Flynne and her brother. His first order of business is to punish his old friend that ratted him out. He positions himself on the bridge Flynne must travel, back from her medical appointment. In a showdown with Billy Ann, Flynne, and Burton, Bob is outgunned and gives himself up to local policeman Tommy. However, he does not remain in custody long; a cloaked vehicle crashes into the sheriff's car and absconds with Bob. Flynne goes to the future to complain to Wilf; she visits RI headquarters and dispatches a Peripheral of Cherise Nuland.
| 6 | "Fuck You and Eat Shit" | Vincenzo Natali | Greg Plageman & Scott B. Smith | November 18, 2022 |
In a flashback to Texas 2028 during the war, it is revealed how Conner became a casualty, tying back to the experiment revealed by Dr. Hogart. Sheriff Jackman is corrupt and owned by Pickett. Flynne and Wilf discover Aelita's ties to the Neoprims, who want to entirely destroy the existing world order established after the Jackpot. Ash creates Peripherals for Connor and Burton. Bob wakes up in Pickett's home under his control. Inspector Lowbeer of the Metropolitan Police makes an appearance in London at the Zubov residence and demands to meet the Polts: Flynne, Burton, and Conner.
| 7 | "The Doodad" | Alrick Riley | Jamie Chan & Scott B. Smith | November 25, 2022 |
Ella Fisher becomes blind again and is taken to the hospital. Inspector Lowbeer brings Flynne, Burton, and Conner to the Zoo, a Met testing ground. Burton and Conner are put to various challenges against ever-increasing Koids, and then terminated by Beatrice (a Peripheral) at the end of the challenge. Tommy retrieves Bob's handgun and futuristic weapon from evidence. After killing Mary Pickett and escaping from the Pickett home, Bob goes to the hospital and takes Ella hostage. Lowbeer informs Flynne that the RI impacted Flynne's timeline much sooner than thought, including implementing futuristic haptic technology, and also intentionally accelerating the occurrence of the Jackpot in Flynne's timeline. Cherise meets with Lowbeer to request help retrieving stolen property. Ash confesses to Zubov that Aelita's plan was to download the stolen information into Burton's haptics (and thus his stub), but because Flynne was piloting the Peripheral the headset translated the data into bacterial DNA, which began to colonize her brain; the data was stolen to give to the Neoprims to destroy their world. Burton arrives at the hospital and kills Bob. Tommy meets with Sheriff Jackman and Mr. Pickett, who wants to frame the Fishers as drug dealers. Wanting to protect the Fisher family, Tommy kills Jackman with Bob's handgun and injures Pickett with the futuristic weapon, leaving him in a coma.
| 8 | "The Creation of a Thousand Forests" | Alrick Riley | Story by : Scott B. Smith; Teleplay by : Scott B. Smith & Greg Plageman | December 2, 2022 |
Ash meets with Cherise and tells her the data Aelita stole is in Flynne's brain and asks that Cherise kill Zubov in return. Wilf finds Aelita, who informs him their implants suppressed their memories, including the slaughter of their respective families and millions of others by the Klept. Tommy successfully pins the blame of killing Jackman and injuring Mr. Pickett on Bob. Flynne creates a new stub, and has Conner kill her in her timeline to make it appear Lowbeer had her killed, destroying the data in her brain. Flynne then wakes in her Peripheral in London and plans the next steps with Lowbeer. In an after-credits scene, Zubov encounters some unknown Russian men, who order Zubov to cut all ties to the RI, or else.

== Release ==
The Peripheral had its world premiere on October 11, 2022, at the Ace Hotel in Los Angeles, before its debut on October 21, 2022, on Amazon Prime Video. As with other Amazon shows, the episodes aired at midnight Eastern, so technically the release dates were the day before for the Pacific audience. The first season had 8 episodes and ended with a cliffhanger, with Lisa Joy stating, "I would love to have season 2 and season 3 and all the seasons in the world to explore this amazing, amazing novel."

== Reception ==
The review aggregator website Rotten Tomatoes reported a 78% approval rating with an average rating of 6.7/10, based on 54 critic reviews. The website's critics consensus reads, "Somewhere on the edges of this sci-fi vision is a compelling narrative, but The Peripheral's single-minded focus on its lofty ideas comes at the expense of character or coherence." Metacritic, which uses a weighted average, assigned a score of 57 out of 100 based on 20 critics, indicating "mixed or average reviews".
