= Gary Carr (actor) =

English actor and musician (born 1986)

- Born: 11 December 1986 (age 39); London, England
- Education: National Youth Music Theatre; Arts Educational Schools, London; London Academy of Music and Dramatic Art
- Occupations: Actor; dancer; singer; musician
- Years active: 2009–present

Gary Carr (born 11 December 1986) is an English actor, dancer, singer, and musician known for his works on screen and stage. He has had main character roles in the BBC TV series Death in Paradise (2011–2014) and American TV series The Deuce (2017–2018). He is also known for playing an American jazz singer named Jack Ross in the ITV historical drama Downton Abbey (2014).

== Education ==
Carr began training at the National Youth Music Theatre of Great Britain, then trained at the Arts Educational Schools from 2003 through 2005, and then at the London Academy of Music and Dramatic Art from 2005 to 2008 with a scholarship from the Leverhulme Trust.

== Career ==
Since graduating from LAMDA in July 2008, Carr has appeared in television productions for BBC and ITV, and in the Royal National Theatre production of Dido, Queen of Carthage, written by Christopher Marlowe and directed by James MacDonald.

Carr starred in the first three series of the BBC mystery dramedy Death in Paradise, playing police officer Fidel Best from 2011 to 2014. He played charismatic pimp C. C. in the American TV series The Deuce in 2017 and 2018, with guest appearances in the third and final series in 2019. He is also known for playing American jazz singer Jack Ross in the ITV historical drama Downton Abbey in series 4, which aired in 2013.

His theatrical work includes Yerma and Macbeth. In November 2009, he played the lead role in the Royal National Theatre stage production of the Terry Pratchett novel Nation, adapted by Mark Ravenhill and directed by Melly Still. He appeared in the Amazon Prime Video series The Peripheral.

== Personal life ==
Carr's brother, Daniel, is a professional footballer who has played international football for Trinidad and Tobago.

== Filmography ==
=== Film ===
Year	Title	Role	Notes
2015	Caesar	Decius	
2019	Bolden	Buddy Bolden	
2019	21 Bridges	Hawk	

=== Television ===
Year	Title	Role	Notes
2009	Holby City	Devon Frost	Episode: "Truth and Mercy"
2009	Law & Order: UK	PC Wheeler	Episode: "Community Service"
2010	National Theatre Live	Mau	Episode: "Nation"
2010	Foyle's War	Paul Jennings	Episode: "Killing Time"
2011	Frankenstein's Wedding	Giles	Television film
2011	Planet of the Apemen	Jala	Episode: "Neanderthal"
2011–2014	Death in Paradise	Fidel Best	24 episodes
2012	Silent Witness	Myers, Clerical Worker	4 episodes
2012	Inspector George Gently	Joseph Kenny	Episode: "Gently Northern Soul"
2013	Bluestone 42	Millsy	8 episodes
2013	Downton Abbey	Jack Ross	4 episodes
2017–2018	The Deuce	C.C.	16 episodes
2019	The Good Fight	Himself	2 episodes
2019	Modern Love	Jeff	2 episodes
2020	Trigonometry	Kieran	Miniseries
2022	The Peripheral	Wilf	Main role
2024	Genius	Clyde X	Main role
2026	Nocturne	Nathan	Upcoming series

=== Video games ===
Year	Title	Role	Notes
2017	Mass Effect: Andromeda	Liam Kosta	Video game

== Awards ==
- National Operatic and Dramatic Association Junior Award
- LAMDA Fight Night Competition Winner 2006
- Leverhulme Trust Bursary, Scholarship
- John Collins Millennium Cup for Drama
