= Alex Hernandez (writer) =

Cuban-American science fiction writer

- Born: Alexander Hernandez; September 27, 1978 (age 48); Miami, Florida
- Occupations: Librarian, writer

Alex Hernandez (born 27 September 1978) is a Cuban-American science fiction writer based in South Florida. The first of his extensive Cuban family to be born in the United States, Hernandez writes in a genre of his own making, which he calls Transhuman Mambo (also the title of his 2013 short story collection). According to Hernandez this neologism is based on the popular coupling of a scientific term with a musical form (e.g. space opera), which accurately describes the combination of his love of science fiction with the Cuban culture of his upbringing. Deeply influenced as a child by the work of Isaac Asimov, Hernandez connected in a personal way to this immigrant whose first language was also not English. Discovering the novels of Octavia E. Butler while in college had an equally profound impact on his writing.

Hernandez got his start writing indie webcomics in the early 2000s. He is known for his work on the open source character, Jenny Everywhere. He also has an extensive list of creator-owned work such as Eleggua, Thoth Boy, Kobuta, Children of Mars.

Whilst working as an administrator of the Miami Dade College Library, Hernandez has published a number of short stories in science fiction publications, including “A Thing with Soft Bonds”, which was included in Near Kin: A Collection of Words and Art Inspired by Octavia E. Butler (2014) and which was nominated for a Pushcart Prize. Most recently, his story “Caridad” was included in Latin@ Rising An Anthology of Latin@ Science Fiction and Fantasy, Wings Press, 2017. Hernandez's short stories have also appeared in the popular and long-running Man-Kzin Wars series created by Larry Niven published by Baen Books. Others of his stories have been published at Baen.com, The Colored Lens, and Interstellar Fiction.

Alex Hernandez, along with Matthew David Goodwin and Sarah Rafael Garcia, edited Speculative Fiction for Dreamers, a collection of YA Latinx speculative fiction. The anthology will be published by Ohio State University Press, slated to be released in August 2021.

Hernandez is a third cousin of Orlando Ortega-Medina, the author of Jerusalem Ablaze: Stories of Love and Other Obsessions.

== Novels ==
- Tooth and Talon (2017)

== Short stories ==
- "Bound for the Promised Land," published in Man-Kzin Wars XIII, Baen Books, 2012.
- "At the Gates," published in Man-Kzin Wars XIII, Baen Books, 2012.
- "Beasts on the Shore of Light," The Colored Lens, Issue #3, 2012.
- "Murder of Crows," Baen.com, 2012.
- "Tread Lightly," Interstellar Fiction, 2013.
- "Lions on the Beach," published in Man-Kzin Wars XIV, Baen Books, 2013.
- "A Thing of Soft Bonds," published in Near Kin: A Collection of Words and Art Inspired by Octavia Estelle Butler, Sybaritic Press, 2014.
- "The Properties of Water," Bastion Science Fiction Magazine, Issue #4, 2014.
- "Of Radiation and Reunion," Whiteside Review, 2015.
- "The Jicotea Princess," Three-lobed Burning Eye (3LBE), Issue #28, 2016.
- "Caridad," published in Latin@ Rising: An Anthology of Latin@ Science Fiction and Fantasy, Wings Press, 2017.
- "A Sea-Change," published in MAÑANA: Latinx Comics From the 25th Century, POWER & MAGIC PRESS, 2021.
- "Arzadu and the Sea," published in Upon a Twice Time, Air and Nothingness Press, 2021.

== Poetry ==
- "Cien Mil Soles," published in Multiverse – an international anthology of science fiction poetry, The New Curiosity Shop, 2018.
- "Playground Rule # 5: Play Nicely Together," published in Poeticdiversity (vol. 16 no. 2) , 2019.
- "Emergence," published in Eccentric Orbits: An Anthology Of Science Fiction Poetry, Volume 2, Dimensionfold Publishing, 2021.
