= Reno Wilson =

American actor

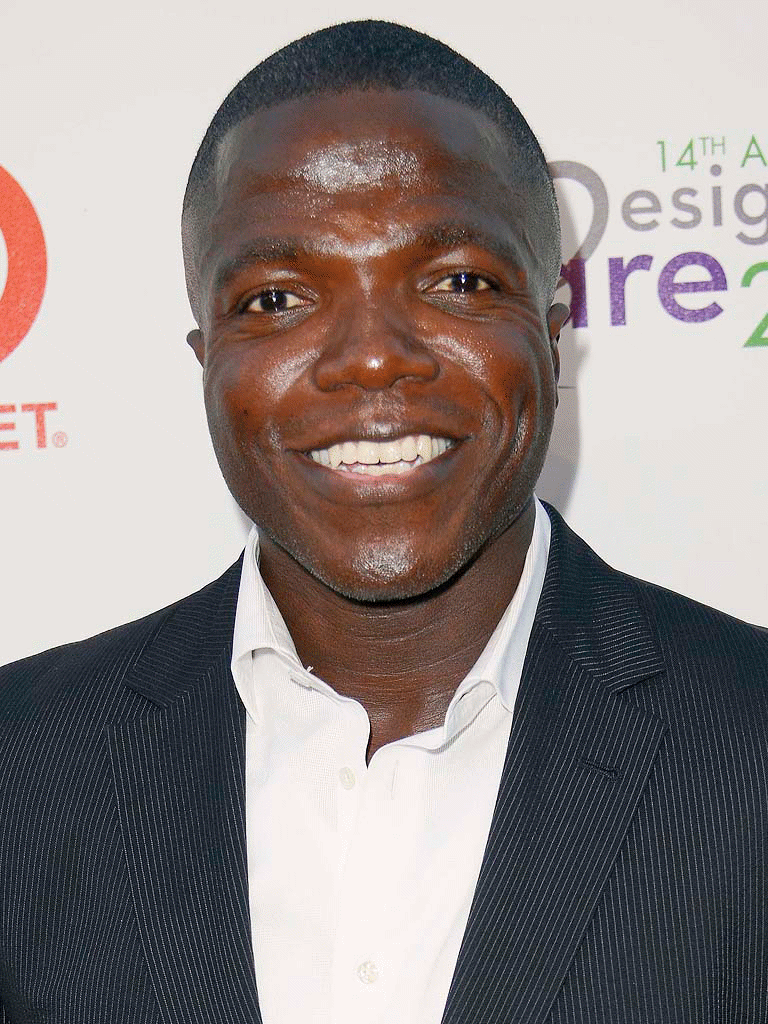
- Wilson in 2010
- Born: Roy Wilson; January 20, 1969 (age 57); Brooklyn, New York, U.S.
- Occupation: Actor
- Years active: 1988–present
- Spouse: Coco Fausone
- Children: 2

Roy "Reno" Wilson (born January 20, 1969) is an American actor. He is best known for his roles as Howard in the sitcom The Cosby Show, Officer Carl McMillan in Mike & Molly, Stan Hill in Good Girls, Wes in The Chronicle (2001–2002), and Detective Tom Selway in Blind Justice (2005). He is also known for providing character voices in the Transformers film series, and portraying Bailey in She Creature (2001) and Louis Armstrong in Bolden (2019).

== Early life ==
Wilson was born Roy Wilson in Brooklyn, New York City.

== Career ==
Wilson has appeared in a number of television programs and films. His first television role was on the NBC's The Cosby Show, where (on a recurring basis) he portrayed Theo Huxtable's college friend Howard during Seasons 5 and 6 of the series. His most recent film roles were that of Orlando in Crank and Crank: High Voltage. He was also a main cast member on the CBS sitcom Mike & Molly (Wilson frequently works with good friend and fellow actor Billy Gardell), and has also acted in Prison Break. Wilson is known as the voices of Frenzy, Mudflap and Brains in the Transformers film series. He is also the voice of Sazh Katzroy in Final Fantasy XIII and its sequels, Final Fantasy XIII-2 and Lightning Returns: Final Fantasy XIII.

== Personal life ==
He currently lives in Los Angeles with his wife Coco and their two children.

== Filmography ==
=== Film ===
Year	Title	Role	Note
1996	The Great White Hype	Roper's Crony #3	
1996	Sgt. Bilko	Radio DJ	
1997	Los Locos	Deacon	
1998	Fallen	Mike	
1998	Mighty Joe Young	Poacher	
1999	Whiteboyz	Mace	
2001	She Creature	Bailey	
2002	R.S.V.P.	Garrett	
2004	Fronterz	Tracy Baker / Lil' Problem	
2006	Crank	Orlando	
2007	Transformers	Frenzy (voice)	
2009	Crank: High Voltage	Orlando	
2009	Transformers: Revenge of the Fallen	Mudflap (voice)	
2010	Kill Speed	Kyle Jackson	Direct-to-video
2011	Transformers: Dark of the Moon	Brains (voice)	
2014	Transformers: Age of Extinction	Brains (voice)	
2015	Tooken	Money Maker	
2017	Transformers: The Last Knight	Mohawk, Sqweeks (voices)	
2019	Bolden	Louis Armstrong	
2019	Grand-Daddy Day Care	Frank Collins	
2021	Born a Champion	Terry Pittman	
2023	A Snowy Day in Oakland	Marquis King	

=== Television ===
Year	Title	Role	Notes
1988–1989	The Cosby Show	Howard	10 episodes
1993–1996	Martin	Sonny	Episodes: "Thanks for Nothing" "Wedding Bell Blues"
1994	The Fresh Prince of Bel-Air	Steve (Will's old friend)	Episode: "The Philadelphia Story"
1994	Coach	Chip	Episode: "It Should Happen to You" "Out of Control"
1995	If Not for You	Bobby Beaumont	7 episodes
1995	Under One Roof	Nate	Episode: "Ronnie's Got a Gun"
1998	NYPD Blue		Episode: "Box of Wendy"
1999	Sliders	James	Episode: "Please Press One"
2001–2002	The Chronicle	Wes Freewald	22 episodes
2003	Las Vegas	Frank Kulchak; Willy Hammond	Episodes: "Semper Spy" "Delinda's Box: Part 1"
2005	Blind Justice	Detective Tom Selway	13 episodes
2006	Heist	Tyrese Evans	Episodes: "Pilot" "Sex, Lies and Vinny Momo" "How Billy Got His Groove Back" "Strife" "Bury the Lead" "Ladies and Gentlemen... Sweaty Dynamite"
2006	American Dad!	Singing Sergeant (voice)	Episode: "With Friends Like Steve's"
2007	Lincoln Heights	Ricky Taylor	Episode: "Manchild"
2007	Friday: The Animated Series	Ezal, Additional voices	4 episodes
2009	The Philanthropist	Haitian	Episode: "Haiti"
2010	Scrubs	Dr. Russell Vaughn	Episode: "Our Dear Leaders"
2010–2016	Mike & Molly	Officer Carl McMillan	Series regular, 127 episodes
2018–2021	Good Girls	Stan Hill	Series regular
2023	Bel-Air	James Lewis	5 episodes
2023	Fatal Attraction	Detective Earl Booker	Miniseries
2024–2025	Dexter: Original Sin	Detective Bobby Watt	Main role

=== Video games ===
Year	Title	Role	Source
2009	MadWorld	The Black Baron, Male Reporter	
2009	Final Fantasy XIII	Sazh Katzroy	
2010	Naruto Shippuden: Ultimate Ninja Storm 2	Killer B	
2011	Final Fantasy XIII-2	Sazh Katzroy	
2011	Operation Flashpoint: Red River	S/Sgt Damien Knox	
2011	Star Wars: The Old Republic	Lieutenant Coria, Private Dromol, Private Ozer	
2014	Lightning Returns: Final Fantasy XIII	Sazh Katzroy	
