= Julian Moore-Cook =

Irish actor

- Born: Sarnia, Ontario, Canada
- Occupation: Actor
- Years active: 2013–present

Julian Moore-Cook is an Irish-Canadian actor. Moore-Cook has had various roles in films, television programmes, and theatre.

== Early life ==
Julian Moore-Cook was born in Sarnia, Ontario, Canada, to an African-American father and an Irish mother. The family relocated to Northern Ireland when he was 12 years old. He trained at the East 15 Acting School in Loughton.

== Career ==
Moore-Cook started his career with a role in the Hollywood blockbuster Mission: Impossible – Rogue Nation in addition to a TV role in the medical drama Casualty. He then had a role in 24: Live Another Day. His first major role was as the role of Callum in the tenth season of the ITV sitcom Benidorm. Moore-Cook had roles in the BBC's historic crime drama Peaky Blinders and Channel 4's teen sitcom Derry Girls. In 2022, he had a major role in the Amazon Studios sci-fi The Peripheral in the role of Ossian. From 2024 to 2025, he played the role of DCI Damien Marshall in the BBC's police drama Blue Lights.

=== Theatre career ===
In 2016, Moore-Cook played the role of Simon in Anton Chekhov's Three Sisters at the Lyric Theatre in Belfast. In 2022, he portrayed the role of Lelio in Pierre de Marivaux's The False Servant at the Orange Tree Theatre in London.

In 2024, Moore-Cook starred in the role of Padraig in Martin McDonagh's The Lieutenant of Inishmore at Everyman Theatre in Liverpool. In 2025, he had roles in Conversations After Sex at the Park Theatre in London and in Martin McDonagh's The Pillowman at the Gate Theatre in Dublin.

== Filmography ==
=== Film ===
Year	Show	Role	Notes
2015	Mission: Impossible – Rogue Nation	Drone Technician	
2021	Blonde. Purple	Wyatt	
2023	Ballywalter	Steve	
2024	Critic		Short film
2024	National Theatre Live: Underdog: The Other Other Brontë		

=== Television ===
Year	Show	Role	Notes
2013	Casualty	Craig Clarke	1 episode
2014	24: Live Another Day	Marine #1	2 episodes
2017	Jade Dragon	Matty	1 episode
2017	Holby City	Nico Finefield	1 episode
2018	Benidorm	Callum	8 episodes
2019–20	Doctors	Adam Higgins, Kyle Chipstead	2 episodes
2019	Shakespeare & Hathaway: Private Investigators	Orlan Rowans	1 episode
2020	The VV Vlog	Boyfriend	
2021	Endeavour	Jack Swift	1 episode
2022	Peaky Blinders	Pat	2 episodes
2022	Derry Girls	Paddy	1 episode
2022	The Peripheral	Ossian	8 episodes
2024–25	Blue Lights	DCI Damien Marshall	3 episodes

=== Stage ===
Year	Title	Role	Location
2016	Three Sisters	Simon	Lyric Theatre
2022	The False Servant	Lelio	Orange Tree Theatre
2024	The Lieutenant of Inishmore	Padraic	Everyman Theatre
2025	Conversations After Sex		Park Theatre
2025	The Pillowman		Gate Theatre
