= Buddy Bolden =

American cornetist and jazz pioneer (1877–1931)

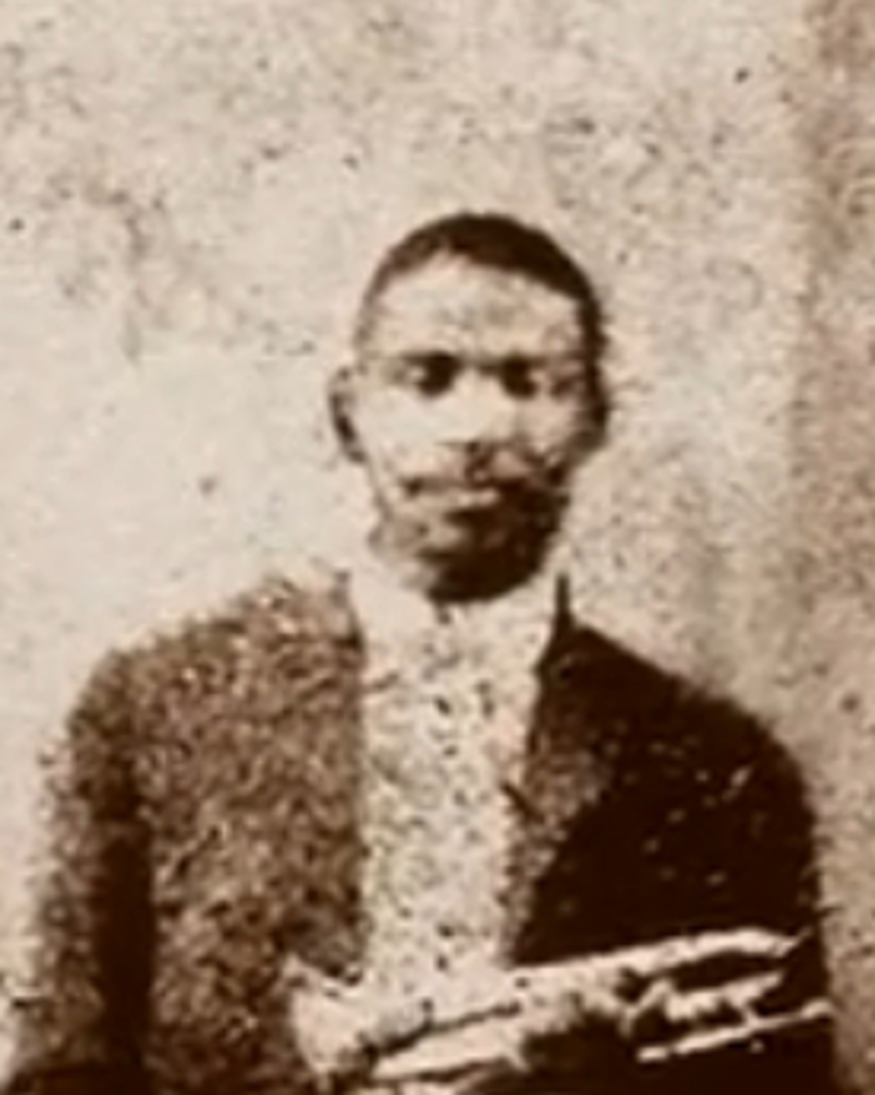
- Bolden c. 1905

Background information
- Born: Charles Joseph Bolden; September 6, 1877; New Orleans, Louisiana, U.S.
- Died: November 4, 1931 (aged 54) Jackson, Louisiana, U.S.
- Genres: Jazz; blues
- Occupation: Musician
- Instrument: Cornet
- Years active: 1890s–1907

Charles Joseph "Buddy" Bolden (September 6, 1877 – November 4, 1931) was an American cornetist who was regarded by contemporaries and later jazz scholars as a key figure in the development of a New Orleans style of ragtime music, or "jass", which later came to be known as jazz.

== Childhood ==
When he was born, Bolden's father, Westmore Bolden, was working as a driver for William Walker, the former enslaver of Buddy's grandfather Gustavus Bolden, who was born in Louisiana in 1806 and died in 1866. Gustavus was most likely born into slavery, although there are no definitive records. His mother, Alice (née Harris), was aged 18 when she married Westmore on August 14, 1873. Westmore Bolden was around 25 at the time, as records show that he was 19 in August 1866. When Buddy was six years old, his father died, after which the boy lived with his mother and other family members. In records of the period the family name is variously spelled Bolen, Bolding, Boldan, and Bolden, thus complicating research. Buddy likely attended Fisk School in New Orleans, though evidence is circumstantial, as early records of this and other local schools are missing.

== Musical career ==
Bolden was known as "King" Bolden (see Jazz royalty), and his band was at its peak in New Orleans from around 1900 to 1907. He was known for his loud sound and improvisational skills, and his style had an impact on younger musicians. Bolden's trombonist Willie Cornish, among others, recalled making phonograph cylinder recordings with the Bolden band, but none are known to survive.

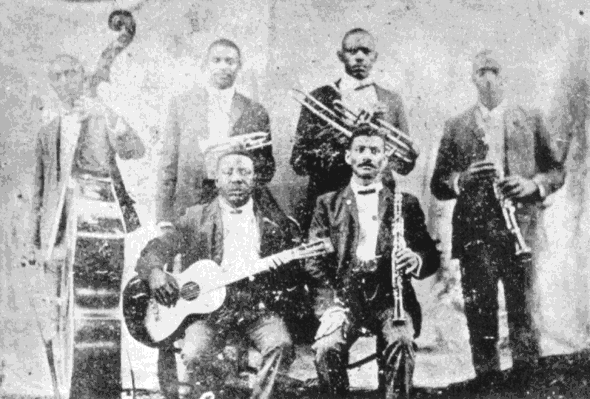
The Bolden band c. 1905 (top: Jimmy Johnson, bass; Bolden, cornet; Willy Cornish, valve trombone; Willy Warner, clarinet; bottom: Brock Mumford, guitar; Frank Lewis, clarinet)

Many early jazz musicians credited Bolden and his bandmates with having originated what came to be known as jazz, though the term was not in common musical use until after Bolden was musically active. Jazz historian Ted Gioia has labelled Bolden the father of jazz, though this is quickly qualified: 'even if he did not invent jazz, he had mastered the recipe for it, which combined the rhythms of ragtime, the bent notes and chord patterns of the blues, and an instrumentation drawn from New Orleans brass bands and string ensembles.' In his A New History of Jazz, Alyn Shipton describes Bolden as having invented 'the music that became jazz.' He is credited with creating a looser, more improvised version of ragtime and adding blues; Bolden's band was said to be the first to have brass instruments play the blues. He was also said to have adapted ideas from gospel music heard in uptown African-American Baptist churches.

Instead of imitating other cornetists, Bolden played the music he heard "by ear" and adapted it to his horn. In doing so, he created a fusion of ragtime, black sacred music, marching-band music, and rural blues. He rearranged the typical New Orleans dance band of the time to better accommodate the blues: string instruments became the rhythm section, and the front-line instruments were clarinets, trombones, and Bolden's cornet. Bolden was known for his powerful, loud, "wide open" playing style. Joe "King" Oliver, Freddie Keppard, Bunk Johnson, and other early New Orleans jazz musicians were directly inspired by his playing.

One of the best known Bolden numbers is "Funky Butt" (later known as "Buddy Bolden's Blues"), which represents one of the earliest references to the concept of funk in popular music. Bolden's "Funky Butt" was, as Danny Barker once put it, a reference to the olfactory effect of an auditorium packed full of sweaty people "dancing close together and belly rubbing." This tune was incendiary in New Orleans at the time: clarinettist Sidney Bechet recalled that 'the police put you in jail if they heard you singing that song.'

Bolden is also credited with the invention of the "Big Four", a key rhythmic innovation on the marching band beat, which gave early jazz more room for individual improvisation. As Wynton Marsalis explains, the big four (below) was the first syncopated bass drum pattern to deviate from the standard on-the-beat march. The second half of the Big Four is the pattern commonly known as the habanera rhythm developed from sub-Saharan African music traditions.

== Physical and mental decline ==
Bolden had an episode of acute alcoholic psychosis in 1907 at age 30. With the full diagnosis of dementia praecox (today called schizophrenia), he was admitted to the Louisiana State Insane Asylum at Jackson, a mental institution, where he spent the rest of his life. Recent research has suggested that Bolden may in fact have had pellagra, a vitamin deficiency common among poor and black groups in the population, which in 1907 swept through the southern United States. In his essay "Jazz and disability", George McKay positions Bolden (alongside disabled European guitarist Django Reinhardt) as a pivotal figure in this new music's inclusive capacity: "Apparently from an edge, the edge of sound mental health or a normal life itself, Buddy Bolden seems to have had a mind that let him hear and create a new music.... [His] tantalizing as well as desperate story, his achievements and influence, which are shrouded in silence, is also one of cognitive impairment at the heart of the jazz tradition." Bolden's death on November 4, 1931, was caused by cerebral arteriosclerosis according to the death certificate.

== Personal life ==
In 1895–1896, Bolden began a relationship with Harriet "Hattie" Oliver, a woman several years his senior who lived in the same neighborhood. Their relationship was brief, and though they never married, she gave birth to their son, Charles Joseph Bolden Jr., on May 2, 1897.

== Further life and legend ==
While there is substantial first-hand oral history about Bolden, facts about his life continue to be lost amidst colorful myth. Stories about his being a barber by trade or that he published a scandal sheet called The Cricket have been repeated in print despite being debunked decades earlier.

== Tributes ==
=== Music ===
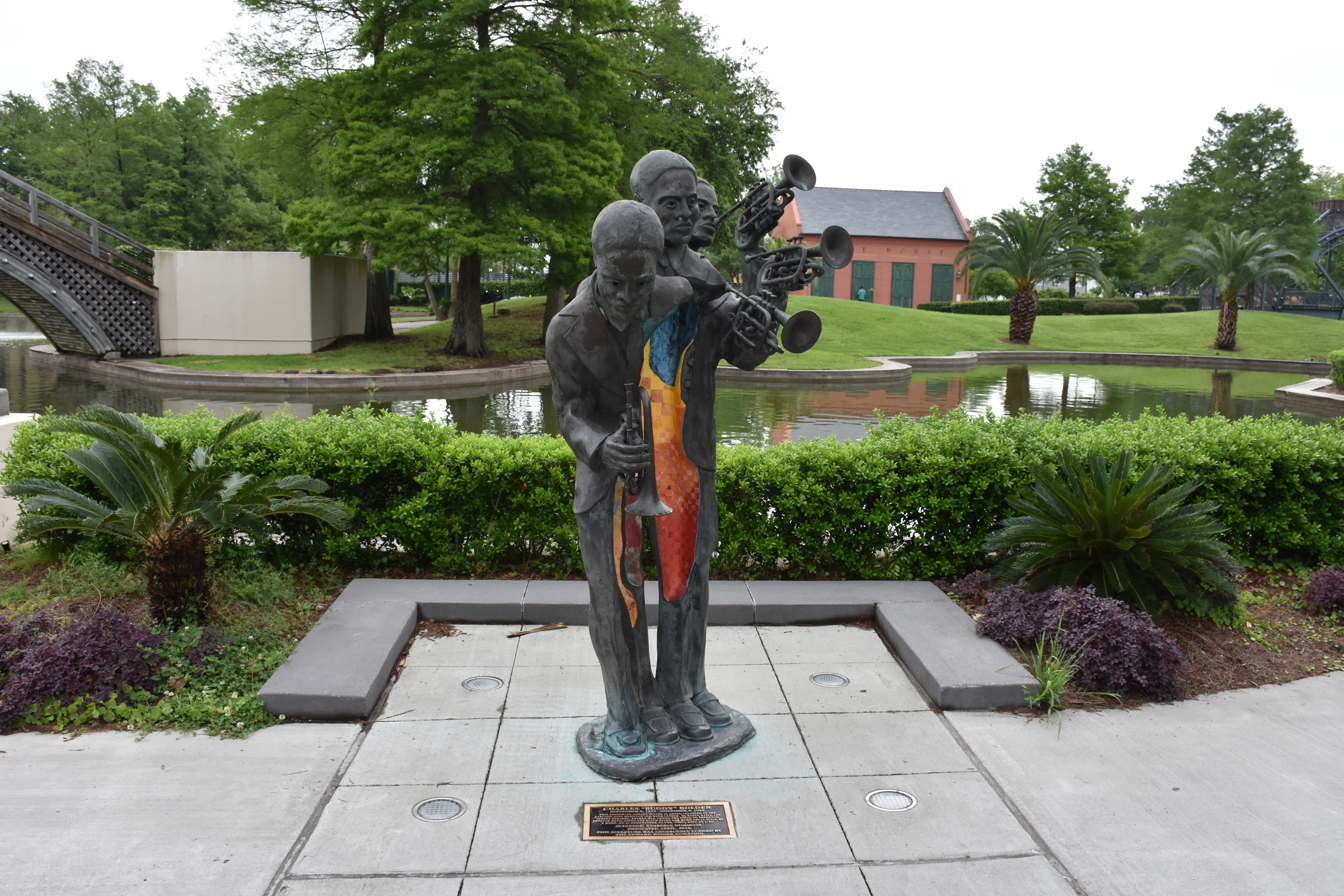
Statue commemorating Bolden in Louis Armstrong Park, New Orleans

- Duke Ellington paid tribute to Bolden in his 1957 suite A Drum Is a Woman. The trumpet part was taken by Clark Terry.
- The Bolden band tune "Funky Butt", better known as "Buddy Bolden's Blues" since it was first recorded under that title by Jelly Roll Morton, alternatively titled "I Thought I Heard Buddy Bolden Say", has been covered by hundreds of artists, including Dr. John, on his 1992 album Goin' Back to New Orleans, and Hugh Laurie, on his 2011 album Let Them Talk.
- "Hey, Buddy Bolden" is a song on the 1962 album Nina Simone Sings Ellington.
- Wynton Marsalis speaks about Bolden in an introduction and performs "Buddy Bolden" on his album Live at the Village Vanguard (1999).
- The Buddyprisen, or Buddy Award, is the prime award honoring Norwegian jazz musicians.
- Hop Along wrote "Buddy in the Parade" as a tribute to Bolden.
- Malachi Thompson recorded Buddy Bolden's Rag in 1995.
- An opera, Buddy Bolden, written by alto sax player Jeff Crompton was staged in Atlanta.
- Bruce Cockburn has included “Buddy Bolden’s Blues” on his 2026 album, “The Blood of Others”.

=== Fiction ===
Bolden has inspired a number of fictional characters with his name.

- The Canadian author Michael Ondaatje wrote the novel Coming Through Slaughter (1976), which features a Buddy Bolden character who in some ways resembles Bolden, but in other ways is deliberately contrary to what is known about him.
- The character of Buddy Bolden helps Samuel Clemens solve a murder in Peter J. Heck's novel A Connecticut Yankee in Criminal Court (1996).
- He is a notable character in Louis Maistros' novel The Sound of Building Coffins, which contains many scenes depicting Bolden playing his cornet.
- Canadian author Christine Welldon wrote the novel Kid Sterling (2021), which centers on the character of Buddy Bolden and his life, based on the author's archival research.
- Nicholas Christopher's historical fiction novel Tiger Rag (2013) centers on the legend and repercussions of a wax cylinder recording by Bolden's band, as well as Bolden's later life.

=== Plays and films ===
- Bolden is featured in August Wilson's 1995 play Seven Guitars. Wilson's drama includes the character King Hedley, whose father named him after King Buddy Bolden. King Hedley constantly sings, "I thought I heard Buddy Bolden say..." and believes that Bolden will come down and bring him money to buy a plantation.
- A biopic about Bolden with mythical elements, titled Bolden!, was released in 2019. It was written and directed by Dan Pritzker. Gary Carr portrays Bolden.
- During the 1980s, an adaptation of Michael Ondaatje's 1976 novel Coming Through Slaughter was staged at Harvard's Hasty Pudding Theater. The music was scored by Steven Provizer and the production was directed by Tim McDonough.
- In 2011, Interact Theater in Minneapolis produced a new work-in-progress musical entitled Hot Jazz at da Funky Butt in which Buddy Bolden was the feature character. The music and lyrics were by Aaron Gabriel and featured New Orleans musicians and collaborators Zena Moses, Eugene Harding and Jeremy Phipps. In 2018, Interact Theater premiered the production renamed Hot Funky Butt Jazz at the Guthrie Theater in Minneapolis, MN. The song "Dat's How Da Music Do Ya" quoted the "Buddy Bolden Blues".
- A three-channel video installation, "Precarity", was created by the British experimental filmmaker John Akomfrah in 2017 as a commissioned piece for the Ogden Museum and the Nasher Museum, exploring themes related to the life of Buddy Bolden.
