= Margaret Clunie =

English actress

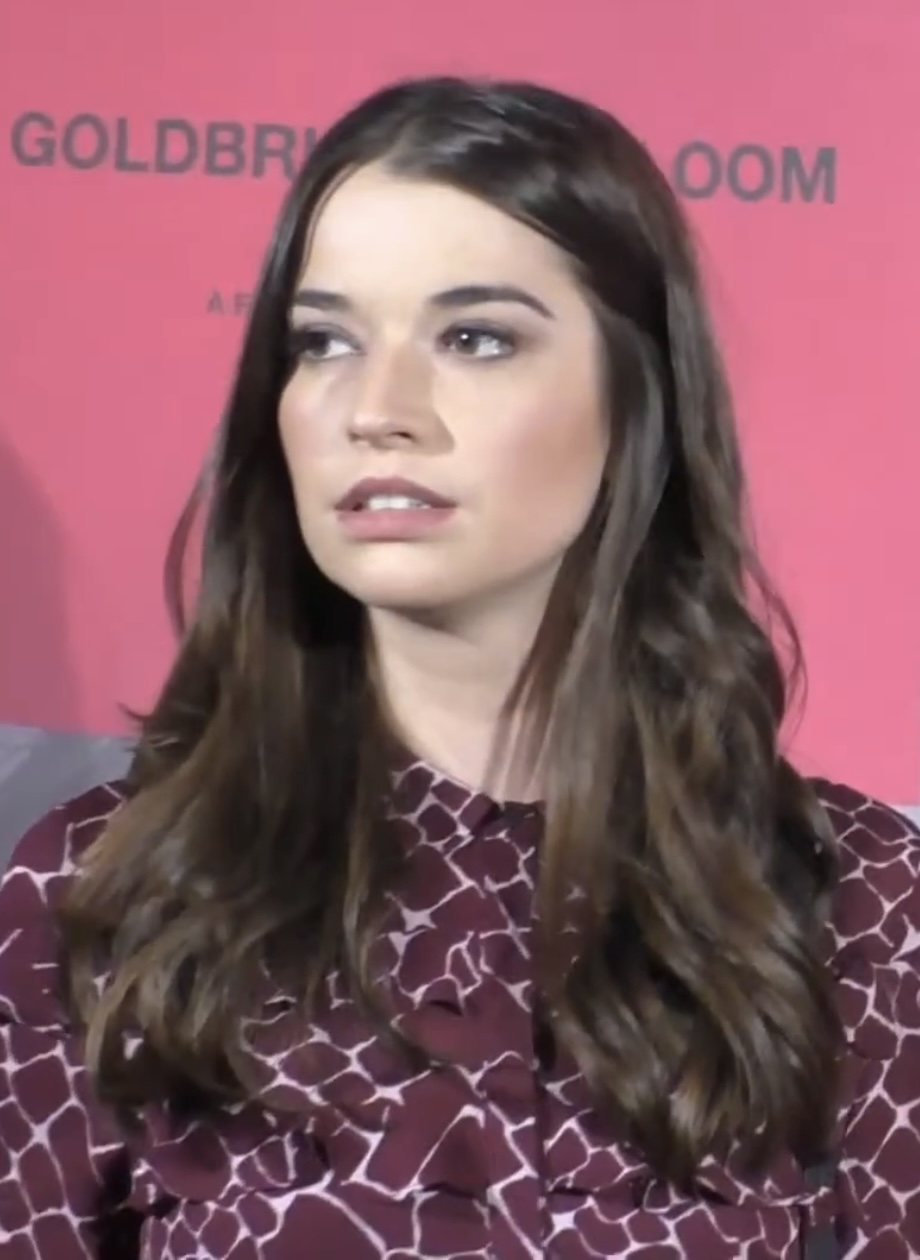
- Clunie at the premiere of Goldbricks in Bloom (2016)
- Born: Margaret Jayne Clunie; 2 October 1987 (age 39)
- Education: Newcastle University; Oxford School of Drama
- Occupations: Actress; model
- Years active: 2008–present
- Spouse: Tom Bull (m. 2016)

Margaret Jayne Clunie (born 2 October 1987) is an English actress and former model. She is known for her role as Harriet, Duchess of Sutherland in the ITV series Victoria (2016–2017).

== Early life ==
Clunie grew up in Rickmansworth, Hertfordshire, the daughter of a business consultant and a medical secretary. She has an elder sister. Clunie initially wanted to be a fashion journalist. She studied English at Newcastle University, where she participated in theatre. She went on to graduate from the Oxford School of Drama in 2010.

== Career ==
Clunie was 14 when she was scouted to be a model on the Tube. She spent her weekends on shoots and later walked at London Fashion Week, but said she found much of it "soul destroying", a "confidence-crushing conveyor belt" with "gorgeous young girls being told they’re not good enough, that they’re fat and look awful".

Clunie made her television debut in a 2012 episode of the BBC One medical soap opera Doctors. The following year, she had a recurring role as Natasha in the second series of the Sky Arts dark comedy A Young Doctor's Notebook with Daniel Radcliffe and Jon Hamm. She made her London stage debut in Hard Feelings at the Finborough Theatre the following year.

In 2016 and 2017, Clunie portrayed Harriet, Duchess of Sutherland in the first two series of the ITV biographical drama Victoria. She also played Jess in Danny Sangra's comedy film Goldbricks in Bloom.

In 2019, Clunie guest starred in an episode of the BBC One crime series Death in Paradise and appeared in the romantic comedy film Last Christmas. This was followed by roles as Ellie in the Greek miniseries Kart postal (or Postcard) in 2021, the Hostess in the Disney+ series Andor in 2022, and Domenica Howarth in the second series of the Channel 5 crime drama Dalgliesh.

Clunie featured in the 2024 John Lewis Christmas advert.

== Personal life ==
In December 2016, Clunie married Tom Bull at St Giles' Church, Camberwell; they had been in a relationship for nearly a decade. As of 2016, the couple resided in Peckham.

== Filmography ==
=== Film ===
Year	Title	Role	Notes
2008	Nobody's Business	Hope	Short film
2010	The Uncatchable Killer	Margaret Clunie	Short film
2011	Starcrossed	Cassy	Short film
2011	Johnny English Reborn	Receptionist 3	
2012	Love Like Hers	Ella	Short film
2013	No F****** Around in Room 427	Polly	Short film
2013	I Know	Jess	Short film
2013	Suspend Belief	Polly	Short film
2014	Groucho Nietzsche		Short film
2014	Sophia Grace & Rosie's Royal Adventure	Princess Abigail	Direct-to-video
2014	Smart TV	Chloe	Short film
2014	Intervention	Amy	Short film
2015	Christmas Eve	Sherry	
2016	The Story of Tobias Medallion	Polly / Jess	Short film
2016	Goldbricks in Bloom	Jess	
2017	Carnage	Model	
2017	The Seedlings	Anabell	Short film
2018	Hands Free	Mrs. Morris / Eleanor Bridges	Short film
2019	Here Comes Hell	Christine	
2019	Last Christmas	Sarah	

=== Television ===
Year	Title	Role	Notes
2012	Doctors	Mary Dixon	1 episode
2013	Pramface	Amy	1 episode
2013	PhoneShop	Emily	1 episode
2013	A Young Doctor's Notebook	Natasha	3 episodes
2014	Babylon	Gina	1 episode
2016	Endeavour	Elva Piper	1 episode
2016	Soul Broken Sky	Sara Robins	Television film
2016–2017	Victoria	Harriet, Duchess of Sutherland	14 episodes
2017	Urban Myths	Marcie	1 episode
2017	Upstart Crow	Contessa Silvia	1 episode
2017	Stella Gets Her Wings	Megan	Miniseries
2018	Patrick Melrose	Helene / Waitress	1 episode
2019	Death in Paradise	Ruth Dacre	Episode: "Frappe Death Day"
2021	Postcard	Ellie	12 episodes
2022	Andor	Hostess	2 episodes
2023	Dalgliesh	Domenica Howarth	2 episodes
2023	Sister Boniface Mysteries	Abigail Usher	1 episode
2024	For Love and Honey	Eva	Television film

== Stage ==
Year	Title	Role	Notes
2012	The Best Years of Your Life	Karen	Rifle Hall, Halesworth
2013	Hard Feelings	Annie	Finborough Theatre, London
