= Here Comes Hell =

- Directed by: Jack McHenry
- Written by: Jack McHenry; Alice Sidgwick
- Produced by: Olivia Loveridge
- Starring: Margaret Clunie; Jessica Webber; Tom Bailey; Timothy Renouf; Charlie Robb; Maureen Bennett
- Cinematography: Rory McHenry
- Edited by: Sheila Wild
- Music by: Ben Pearson
- Production company: Trashouse Films
- Distributed by: Giant Pictures
- Release dates: 1 March 2019 (FrightFest Glasgow); 11 November 2019 (UK)
- Running time: 75 minutes
- Country: United Kingdom
- Language: English

Here Comes Hell is a 2019 British comedy horror film directed by Jack McHenry, starring Margaret Clunie, Jessica Webber, Tom Bailey, Timothy Renouf, Charlie Robb and Maureen Bennett.

== Cast ==
- Margaret Clunie as Christine
- Jessica Webber as Elizabeth
- Tom Bailey as George
- Timothy Renouf as Freddie
- Charlie Robb as Victor
- Maureen Bennett as Madame Bellrose
- Nicholas Le Prevost as Ichabod Quinn
- Jasper Britton as The Host
- Robert Llewellyn as Jeffrey Bank
- Alfred Bradley as Victor's Father

== Release ==
The film premiered at Glasgow FrightFest on 1 March 2019.

== Reception ==
On Rotten Tomatoes, the film has an approval rating of 100% based on 5 reviews. Garry McConnachie of Glasgow Live called the film a "clash of genres that will particularly delight fans of gross-out practical gore and wacky storytelling, all complete with heightened performances from the cast, which make for the perfect blend of horror-comedy."

Rafael Motamayor of /Film gave the film a rating of 8.5/10 and called it "one of the most impressive feature debuts of the year as well as one of the most fun "what-ifs" imaginable".

Film critic Kim Newman called the film an "affectionate, entertaining pastiche".

Anton Bitel of SciFiNow wrote that the film "brings about its own deconstruction, literally collapsing on the ancient foundations that support its knowingly flimsy premise."
