= Man–Kzin Wars =

Series of military SF short story collections

- Cover of Man–Kzin Wars III. Art by Stephen Hickman.
- 1. The Man–Kzin Wars; 2. Man–Kzin Wars II; 3. Man–Kzin Wars III; 4. Man–Kzin Wars IV; 5. Man–Kzin Wars V 6. Man–Kzin Wars VI; 7. Man–Kzin Wars VII; 8. A Darker Geometry: A Man–Kzin Novel; 9. Man–Kzin Wars VIII: Choosing Names; 10. Man–Kzin Wars IX; 11. Man–Kzin Wars X: The Wunder War; 12. Man–Kzin Wars XI; 13. Destiny's Forge: A Man–Kzin Novel; 14. Man–Kzin Wars XII; 15. Man–Kzin Wars XIII; 16. Man–Kzin Wars XIV; 17. Treasure Planet: A Man–Kzin Novel; 18. Man–Kzin Wars XV; 19. Freedom: A Man–Kzin Novel
- Author: Larry Niven; Poul Anderson; Dean Ing; Jerry Pournelle; S. M. Stirling; Donald Kingsbury; Greg Bear; Thomas T. Thomas; Mark O. Martin; Gregory Benford; Hal Colebatch; Paul Chafe; Warren W. James; Jessica Q. Fox; Jane Lindskold; Charles E. Gannon; Alex Hernandez; David Bartell; Matthew Joseph Harrington
- Country: United States
- Language: English
- Genre: Military science fiction
- Publisher: Baen Books
- Published: 1988–2019
- Media type: Print (hardback & paperback)
- No. of books: 17

The Man–Kzin Wars is the name of a series of military science fiction anthologies as well as the name of the first book in the series. The short stories detail the eponymous conflicts between mankind and the Kzinti, set in Larry Niven's Known Space universe. However, Niven himself has written only a small number of the stories; most were written by other science fiction writers, as Niven opened this part of the Known Space to collaboration in the form of a shared universe. The cover art for the books in the series is created by Stephen Hickman.

== Origins ==
The first story set in the Man–Kzin Wars, "The Warriors" (1966), was one of Niven's earliest published stories and one of the first of what would become his Known Space series. Niven did not consider himself qualified to write war stories; therefore, although a number of his later stories referenced the Man–Kzin Wars, he never actually showed them. However, there was a large fan demand for stories covering the conflict, and a number of his author friends had shown interest in writing tales set in the time frame. Niven, therefore, allowed the Man–Kzin Wars to become a shared universe, starting with the 1988 release of The Man–Kzin Wars. Starting with volume three, Niven himself has composed several additional stories in the series, although the majority of content has been written by other authors. The resulting series has also been described as a "franchise".

Initially, there were only plans for two volumes. Niven, along with John Hewitt (one of the main writers for the Ringworld RPG) composed a "Bible" for aspiring writers, including several pages of notes composed between the two of them and photocopied pages of the RPG. The Bible included corrections for some of the inconsistencies in Niven's work. Jerry Pournelle and Poul Anderson were among the first authors approached, and both ended up writing stories.

The series has continued to the current day (volume XV was released in 2019).

== The stories ==
Title	Published	Collected in	Written by
"The Warriors"	1966	Worlds of If; Tales of Known Space; The Man–Kzin Wars; Three Books of Known Space; The Best of All Possible Wars†	Larry Niven
"Iron"	1988	The Man–Kzin Wars; Inconstant Star†	Poul Anderson
"Cathouse"	1988	The Man–Kzin Wars; Cathouse†; The Houses of the Kzinti†	Dean Ing
"Briar Patch"	1989	Man–Kzin Wars II; Cathouse; The Houses of the Kzinti	Dean Ing
"The Children's Hour"	1989	Man–Kzin Wars II; The Children's Hour†; The Houses of the Kzinti	Jerry Pournelle and S. M. Stirling
"Madness Has Its Place"	1990	Man–Kzin Wars III; N-Space; Three Books of Known Space; The Best of All Possible Wars	Larry Niven
"The Asteroid Queen"	1990	Man–Kzin Wars III; The Children's Hour	Jerry Pournelle and S.M. Stirling
"Inconstant Star"	1990	Man–Kzin Wars III; Inconstant Star	Poul Anderson
"The Survivor"	1991	Man–Kzin Wars IV; The Space Opera Renaissance	Donald Kingsbury
"The Man Who Would Be Kzin"	1991	Man–Kzin Wars IV; The Best of All Possible Wars	Greg Bear and S. M. Stirling
"In The Hall of the Mountain King"	1992	Man–Kzin Wars V; The Best of All Possible Wars	Jerry Pournelle and S.M. Stirling
"Hey Diddle Diddle"	1992	Man–Kzin Wars V	Thomas T. Thomas
"The Heroic Myth of Lieutenant Nora Argamentine"	1994	Man–Kzin Wars VI	Donald Kingsbury
"Trojan Cat"	1994	Man–Kzin Wars VI	Mark O. Martin and Gregory Benford
"The Colonel's Tiger"	1995	Man–Kzin Wars VII; Centaurus: the best of Australian science fiction	Hal Colebatch
"A Darker Geometry"	1995	Man–Kzin Wars VII; A Darker Geometry†	Mark O. Martin and Gregory Benford
"Prisoner of War"	1995	Man–Kzin Wars VII	Paul Chafe
"Choosing Names"	1998	Choosing Names: Man–Kzin Wars VIII	Larry Niven
"Telepath's Dance"	1998	Choosing Names: Man–Kzin Wars VIII	Hal Colebatch
"Galley Slave"	1998	Choosing Names: Man–Kzin Wars VIII	Jean Lamb
"Jotok"†	1998	Choosing Names: Man–Kzin Wars VIII	Paul Chafe
"Slowboat Nightmare"	1998	Choosing Names: Man–Kzin Wars VIII	Warren W. James
"Pele"	2002	Man–Kzin Wars IX	Poul Anderson
"His Sergeant's Honor"	2002	Man–Kzin Wars IX	Hal Colebatch
"Windows of the Soul"	2002	Man–Kzin Wars IX	Paul Chafe
"Fly-by-Night"	2002	Man–Kzin Wars IX	Larry Niven
"One War for Wunderland"	2003	Man–Kzin Wars X: The Wunder War	Hal Colebatch
"The Corporal in the Caves"	2003	Man–Kzin Wars X: The Wunder War	Hal Colebatch
"Music Box"	2003	Man–Kzin Wars X: The Wunder War	Hal Colebatch
"Peter Robinson"	2003	Man–Kzin Wars X: The Wunder War	Hal Colebatch
"Three at Table"	2005	Man–Kzin Wars XI	Hal Colebatch
"Grossgeister Swamp"	2005	Man–Kzin Wars XI	Hal Colebatch
"Catspaws"	2005	Man–Kzin Wars XI	Hal Colebatch
"Teacher's Pet"	2005	Man–Kzin Wars XI	Matthew Joseph Harrington
"War and Peace"	2005	Man–Kzin Wars XI	Matthew Joseph Harrington
"The Hunting Park"	2005	Man–Kzin Wars XI	Larry Niven
"Destiny's Forge"	2006	Destiny's Forge†	Paul Chafe
"Echoes of Distant Guns"	2009	Man–Kzin Wars XII	Matthew Joseph Harrington
"AQUILA ADVENIO"	2009	Man–Kzin Wars XII	Hal Colebatch and Matthew Joseph Harrington
"The Trooper and the Triangle"	2009	Man–Kzin Wars XII	Hal Colebatch
"String"	2009	Man–Kzin Wars XII	Hal Colebatch & Matthew Joseph Harrington
"Peace and Freedom"	2009	Man–Kzin Wars XII	Matthew Joseph Harrington
"Independent"	2009	Man–Kzin Wars XII	Paul Chafe
"Misunderstanding"	2012	Man–Kzin Wars XIII	Hal Colebatch and Jessica Q. Fox
"Two Type of Teeth"	2012	Man–Kzin Wars XIII	Jane Lindskold
"Pick of the Litter"	2012	Man–Kzin Wars XIII	Charles E. Gannon
"Tomcat Tactics"	2012	Man–Kzin Wars XIII	Charles E. Gannon
"At the Gates"	2012	Man–Kzin Wars XIII	Alex Hernandez
"Zeno's Roulette"	2012	Man–Kzin Wars XIII	David Bartell
"Bound for the Promised Land"	2012	Man–Kzin Wars XIII	Alex Hernandez
"A Man Named Saul"	2013	Man–Kzin Wars XIV	Hal Colebatch and Jessica Q. Fox
"Heritage"	2013	Man–Kzin Wars XIV	Matthew Joseph Harrington
"The Marmalade Problem"	2013	Man–Kzin Wars XIV	Hal Colebatch
"Leftovers"	2013	Man–Kzin Wars XIV	Matthew Joseph Harrington
"The White Column"	2013	Man–Kzin Wars XIV	Hal Colebatch
"Deadly Knowledge: A Story of the Man–Kzin Wars"	2013	Man–Kzin Wars XIV	Hal Colebatch
"Lions on the Beach"	2013	Man–Kzin Wars XIV	Alex Hernandez
"Treasure Planet"	2014	Treasure Planet†	Hal Colebatch and Jessica Q. Fox
"Sales Pitch"	2019	Man–Kzin Wars XV	Hal Colebatch
"Singer-of-Truth"	2019	Man–Kzin Wars XV	Martin L. Shoemaker
"The Third Kzin"	2019	Man–Kzin Wars XV	Jason Fregeau
"Excitement"	2019	Man–Kzin Wars XV	Hal Colebatch and Jessica Q. Fox
"Justice"	2019	Man–Kzin Wars XV	Jessica Q. Fox
"Saga"	2019	Man–Kzin Wars XV	Brendan DuBois
"Scrith"	2019	Man–Kzin Wars XV	Brad R. Torgersen
"Freedom"	2020	Freedom†	Hal Colebatch and Jessica Q. Fox

† Additional notes:

- "Iron" and "Inconstant Star" were combined as a single collection, Inconstant Star, in 1991.
- "Cathouse" and "Briar Patch" were combined as a single collection, Cathouse, in 1990.
- "The Children's Hour" and "The Asteroid Queen" were combined as a single collection, The Children's Hour, in 1991.
- "A Darker Geometry" was expanded (an extra segment added to the end) and republished as a novel in 1996.
- "The Warriors", "Madness Has its Place", "The Man Who Would Be Kzin", and "In the Hall of the Mountain King" were collected as The Best of All Possible Wars: The Best of the Man–Kzin Wars in 1998.
- "Cathouse", "Briar Patch", and "The Children's Hour" were collected as The Houses of the Kzinti in 2002.
- "Jotok" was originally titled "The Chosen One".
- In 2001, Annals of the Man–Kzin-Wars: An Unofficial Companion Guide was released. Written by Alan Michaud, it includes illustrations, maps, histories of the Kzinti and humans, character biographies, and story descriptions. It covers the first eight volumes.
- Destiny's Forge is a single novel.
- Treasure Planet is a single novel.
- Freedom is a single novel.

=== Original books ===
Title	Published	ISBN	Notes
The Man–Kzin Wars	1988	ISBN 978-0-671-65411-5	
Man–Kzin Wars II	1989	ISBN 978-0-671-69833-1	
Man–Kzin Wars III	1990	ISBN 978-0-671-72008-7	
Man–Kzin Wars IV	1991	ISBN 978-0-671-72079-7	
Man–Kzin Wars V	1992	ISBN 978-0-671-72137-4	
Man–Kzin Wars VI	1994	ISBN 978-0-671-87607-4	
Man–Kzin Wars VII: A Darker Geometry	1995	ISBN 978-0-671-87670-8	
Choosing Names: Man–Kzin Wars VIII	1998	ISBN 978-0-671-87888-7	
Man–Kzin Wars IX	2001	ISBN 978-0-671-31838-3	
Man–Kzin Wars X: The Wunder War	2005	ISBN 978-0-7434-9894-4	
Man–Kzin Wars XI	2005	ISBN 978-1-4165-0906-6	
Destiny's Forge: A Man–Kzin Novel	2007	ISBN 978-1-4165-5507-0	
Man–Kzin Wars XII	2009	ISBN 978-1-4165-9141-2	
Man–Kzin Wars XIII	2012	ISBN 978-1-4516-3816-5	
Man–Kzin Wars XIV	2013	ISBN 978-1-4516-3938-4	
Treasure Planet: A Man–Kzin Novel	2014	ISBN 978-1-4767-3640-2	
Man–Kzin Wars XV	2019	ISBN 978-1-4814-8377-3	
Freedom: A Man–Kzin Novel	2020	ASIN B084MNNF2G	

=== Reprints/Reworks ===
Title	Published	ISBN	Notes
Cathouse: A Man–Kzin Novel	1990	ISBN 978-0-671-69872-0	
Inconstant Star: A Novel of the Man–Kzin Wars	1991	ISBN 978-0-671-72031-5	
The Children's Hour: A Man–Kzin Novel	1991	ISBN 978-0-671-72089-6	
A Darker Geometry: A Man–Kzin Novel	1996	ISBN 978-0-671-87740-8	
The Best of All Possible Wars: The Best of the Man–Kzin Wars	1998	ISBN 978-0-671-87879-5	
The Houses of the Kzinti	2002	ISBN 978-0-7434-3577-2	
The Man–Kzin Wars: 25th Anniversary Edition*	2013	ISBN 978-1-4516-3900-1	

- The Man–Kzin Wars: 25th Anniversary Edition is a reissue of the first volume, The Man–Kzin Wars, with a "Memoir" by Niven about the publishing of the series.

== Plot summary ==
There are a total of four Man–Kzin Wars, as well as major and minor "Kzinti incidents". The First War began circa 2367. By this time, Human space was in the middle of the "Long Peace". ARM, the United Nations security forces, has completely suppressed all "dangerous" technologies, histories, mental illnesses, and media, leading to not only an end of the war and almost all violent crimes, but a change in society so vast that most people have a difficulty even conceptualizing such things.

The U.N.'s reach was limited to Earth, however. There were a number of other colonies in space, the most important being the Asteroid Belt, Wunderland, We Made It, Jinx, and Plateau.

=== First Man–Kzin War ===
The Kzinti, with vast technical superiority (including gravity drives, telepaths, and a large military empire), detected a human colonization ship in deep space, the Angel's Pencil. After the Kzin telepath learned that the humans were unarmed and did not even understand the concept of weapons, they attempted to kill the human crew in a slow, painful manner using an inductive heating weapon hoping to capture their ship intact for intelligence purposes. However, one of the humans used the ship's powerful drive system (which doubled as an interstellar communications laser) as a weapon and destroyed the Kzin ship, beginning the First Man–Kzin War. The crew then warned Earth of the warlike aliens, although the transmissions were initially dismissed as an outbreak of psychosis. Then a similar encounter between another human ship and the Kzin vessel led to the destruction of the more primitive human ship. However, one of the human prisoners, with the aid of a rogue telepath, was able to escape to the Angel's Pencil and warn them of the danger of their increasing penetration into Kzinti space.

In the course of the First Man–Kzin War, the Kzinti invaded and occupied the human colony of Wunderland, in the Alpha Centauri system, as a staging point for an attack on Earth. Human ships attempting to escape back to Earth were shot down, but a single vessel managed to carry some refugees to the sister colony We Made It. The Kzinti fleet moved on to Earth, but in a replay of first contact, the peaceful humans used communications lasers, fusion drives, and mass drivers to cut the first invasion fleet to ribbons. Over the next several decades, three more fleets were launched against Earth, and all were beaten back. However, after near defeat by the fourth fleet, it was becoming clear to Earth's military leaders that the Kzinti were learning to wage war more effectively than their traditional "scream and leap" tactics, and that the Solar System's defenses would quickly succumb to the Kzinti's superior numbers, firepower, and technology, were it only wielded with a modicum of tactical and strategic sense. In order to delay the next attack, a Terran Bussard ramjet starship was utilized to transport and deploy several relativistic kill vehicles in the Wunderland system. Using iron slugs accelerated to 99% of the speed of light, it devastated a portion of the planet, killing humans and Kzinti alike and delaying the launch of yet another Kzin fleet against Earth. A number of specialists traveled aboard this ship, using Slaver stasis fields for lithobraking, and successfully assassinated the Kzin military leader on Wunderland, Chuut-Riit. Despite this setback for the Kzin cause, preparations for a fifth and decisive assault fleet were nearing completion.

At this point, a passing Outsider ship sold the colony of We Made It the manual for a hyperdrive, a technology unknown to the Kzinti. Dimity Carmody, an escapee from Wunderland and a genius who had toyed with FTL drive concepts before the occupation, managed to construct a working prototype drive using the manual. Hyperdrive ships were dispatched to Earth, where the faster-than-light drive was installed on several ships for a preemptive attack on the Fifth Invasion fleet. The attack hit the Kzin amidst internal struggles following the death of their leader. Due to the huge success, Wunderland was quickly liberated, freeing the fleet to attack other Kzinti worlds. The FTL drive allowed the human fleets to coordinate and concentrate their forces beyond anything the Kzinti could manage, even letting them outrun and jam the news of each successive Kzin defeat. The first indication the Kzinti Patriarchy had that much of the Kzin empire was gone and that a significant percentage of all Kzinti had died was when human warships appeared in the skies above their homeworld.

Meanwhile, however, on Wunderland, now liberated by humans, several surviving Kzin, led by Vaemar-Riit, the last surviving kitten of Chuut-Riit, and with the cooperation of Dimity Carmody, Nils Rykermann, Leonie Rykermann, and other humans began to cautiously cooperate with humans and try to learn human ways. Vaemar-Riit even enrolled at a human university and obtained a reserve officer's commission. These became known as the Wunderkzin, and some later proved to be human allies. This slowly growing Man–Kzin cooperation was bitterly opposed both by many other Kzin and by many revanchist humans on Wunderland, while others among the human and kzin communities on Wunderland sought to manipulate the situation for their own ends. There were also ongoing human situations – for example, Nils Rykermann, a Wunderland academic, in love with Dimity Carmody, married Leonie Rykermann, one of his students, during the occupation, believing Dimity to be dead. This situation has not been resolved. There was also a somewhat ambiguous growing relationship between Dimity and Vaemar-Riit; the two are depicted together on the cover of Man–Kzin Wars XI.

The war ends in 2433 with the signing of the MacDonald-Rishaii Peace Treaty. The vast majority of the Man–Kzin Wars stories are set around the First War.

=== "The Peace" ===
Following the end of hostilities, the Human forces use their hyperdrive ships to initiate a blockade of all Kzinti worlds within range of Human space. The Kzinti of both their homeworld and the prominent colony of W'kkai begin researching hyperdrive technology in an attempt to break the blockade, with the High Admiral of W'kkai also hoping to overthrow the Patriarch. Due to the treachery of Ulf Reichstein Markham, the Kzinti of Kzin gain access to hyperdrive designs and an engineer familiar with them in 2438. During this time, the Kdaptist religion spreads among the Kzinti.

On Wunderland, an attempt is made to form a stable, democratic government. On Earth, although no one seriously believes the Kzin will stay away, the ARM returns to its old habits of trying to eliminate all knowledge and technology of war. We Made It continues to create hyperdrives, as the Human military forces attempt to reverse-engineer Kzinti gravity technology. They also attempt to locate and form an anti-Kzin alliance with the Pierin aliens (although according to the Ringworld RPG, the Pierin may already be enslaved at this point).

A troika of unconventional officers – Belter General Lucas Fry, flatlander Major Yankee Clandeboye, and Wunderlander Admiral Blumenhandler – establish a semi-covert training center on Barnard's Starbase. There the troika develops plans for fighting the hyperdrive-equipped Kzinti in a coming second war. The new plans are needed since the (mostly successful) human tactics in the first were restricted by their own ignorance, and by the ARM's structure: the only successful other planetary assaults the liberation of Wunderland, only two, on Down and Hssin.

The group devises two ways to help prepare the rest of the human military: A war game called Trolls and Bridges, and a book, The Heroic Myth of Lieutenant Nora Argamentine. Written by Clandeboye, they are a fictionalized account of the diary of his cousin, Nora Argamentine. She was a U.N. officer caught by Kzinti, who later rebelled against them before being gradually lobotomized. The book becomes extremely popular and helps raise morale, as well as cultivating the belief that the Kzin will attack again.

=== Second Man–Kzin War ===
All information on the second war comes from the Ringworld RPG guidebook. It begins in 2449 when the Kzinti launch "diversionary raids" on Sigma Draconis and Barnard's Star (which can probably be retconned to be due to Barnard's Starbase from The Heroic Myth of Lieutenant Nora Argamentine) and ends in 2475 with the liberation of the Kdatlyno from Kzin rule.

=== Third Man–Kzin War ===
The Third War is mentioned in the Ringworld RPG and The Ringworld Engineers. According to the Known Space novel Juggler of Worlds, it started in 2490.

Towards the start of the war, the Wunderland Treatymaker weapon is used on the Kzinti fortress-world of Warhead, creating a huge, habitable canyon on the otherwise Mars-like world. Warhead is annexed by the humans and renamed Canyon, where Louis Wu lives as of the start of The Ringworld Engineers. This war is chronicled in considerable detail in the novel Destiny's Forge.

=== Fourth Man–Kzin War ===
The war begins on an unknown date, with Kzinti suicide attacks on Epsilon Eridani. During the war, human adventurers engage in similar suicide attacks on Kzinti harems. The war ends in 2505 with the signing of the Covenants of Shasht, named after a Kzinti world which is annexed by Humans and later renamed Fafnir. The Kzinti are disarmed and restricted to police weapons only. This restriction was still in effect as late as 2657, as specified in The Soft Weapon.

=== Aftermath ===
Over the next decades and centuries, some Kzinti dream of another war, and go to great lengths (such as piracy, seeking Slaver stasis boxes, and going to the Ringworld) in an attempt to gain enough of an upper hand to begin one. There is at least one "major incident" after the Fourth War, which some humans describe as another "war" (see Flatlander). However, each Man–Kzin War ends with the death of 2/3 of all Kzin then alive, and the confiscation of two Kzinti worlds. The surviving Kzinti finally face the reality that another all-out war would bring no benefit. At the time of Ringworld, Kzinti numbers are still less than 1/8 of what they were when they first encountered humans.

In the events of Ringworld, Nessus inadvertently reveals to Wu and Speaker-to-Animals that the Man–Kzin Wars were engineered by the Puppeteers. The Puppeteers viewed the Kzin as too dangerous and hoped a series of wars in which successive generations of the most aggressive Kzinti males were selectively killed off by humans would help breed reason into the Kzinti as the preferred alternative over outright extermination. To that end, the Puppeteers used a starseed lure on Procyon to ensure that the Outsiders would equip mankind with hyperdrives, knowing that it would be the tool that would allow victory for humans.

== Recurring characters ==
- Chuut-Riit – Leader of the Kzinti conquest forces occupying Wunderland.
- Buford Early – ARM general known for unorthodox tactics.
- Ulf Reichstein-Markham – Wunderland resistance leader and, eventually, traitor.
- Dimity Carmody – Interpreter of the alien hyperdrive manual.
- Nils Rykermann – Biologist on Wunderland, later resistance leader, later Wunderland politician.
- Rarrgh – Kzin soldier, later protector of Vaemar-Riit, later seneschal of Vaemar-Riit's palace.
- Leonie Rykermann – Wife of Nils Rykermann.
- Vaemar-Riit – Son of Chuut-Riit. Leader of the "Wunderkzin".
- Arthur Guthlac – Originally an Earth museum guard and illegal collector of forbidden militaria, later brigadier on UNSN General Staff.

== Reception ==
The series has been described as one of the better-known works related to the theme of armed conflict in science fiction.

== Canonicity ==
Larry Niven has never specifically addressed whether or not these stories are part of the canon of Known Space stories. He has ruled "A Darker Geometry" as definitely non-canonical, and the story is incompatible with Juggler of Worlds, which is co-authored by Niven and Edward M. Lerner. Conversely, Niven's story "Fly-By-Night" refers directly to, and summarizes, the events of "Telepath's Dance", so it appears he considers that story canonical. The canonicity of other stories in the series is undetermined.

Many of the stories in the series have added details to Known Space and its history, details which may be incompatible with older stories in the canon (in particular, those written by Niven long before the Man–Kzin Wars series was published). The protagonist in Matthew Joseph Harrington's "Teacher's Pet" from Man–Kzin Wars XI, who has become a Protector after landing on Home while fleeing from Kzinti, deduces several things that (at least at first glance) seem to be at odds with accepted canon – for example, that Puppeteers had been manipulating both humanity and the Kzin far more than anyone had previously thought.

In other cases, stories clearly contradict established canon. For example, various MKW stories state that Kzinti did not establish their own interstellar empire nor invent their own spacefaring technology. Instead, primitive Kzinti warriors were hired as mercenaries by the Jotoki, a species of interstellar traders, whom the Kzinti later overthrew and enslaved.

Yet, Niven's "The Soft Weapon" states:

There had been a time, between the discoveries of atomic power and the gravity polarizer, when it seemed the Kzinti species would destroy itself in wars. Now the Kzinti held many worlds, and the danger was past.

However, "Jotok" suggests a possible compromise scenario. In that story, primitive Kzinti clans on the Kzin homeworld are being marginalized by advanced Kzinti who use atomic power and gravity polarizer-driven spacecraft. It is the primitives who are hired by the Jotoki, to use as mercenaries against the more advanced Kzinti.
