= Paul Chafe =

Canadian science fiction author

Paul Chafe was born in Toronto, Ontario in 1965 and grew up in Hamilton, Ontario. He is a Canadian science fiction author who frequently publishes with Baen Books. In addition to his own original work, he has published several stories in Larry Niven's Man-Kzin Wars series, including Destiny's Forge, the first full-length novel in that series. His most recent novels are Genesis (released in November 2007) and Exodus (November 2009) of the Ark Trilogy, which will be completed by Revelations (forthcoming). He is also an infantry officer in the Canadian Army reserves.
