= Evan Jonigkeit =

American actor (born 1983)

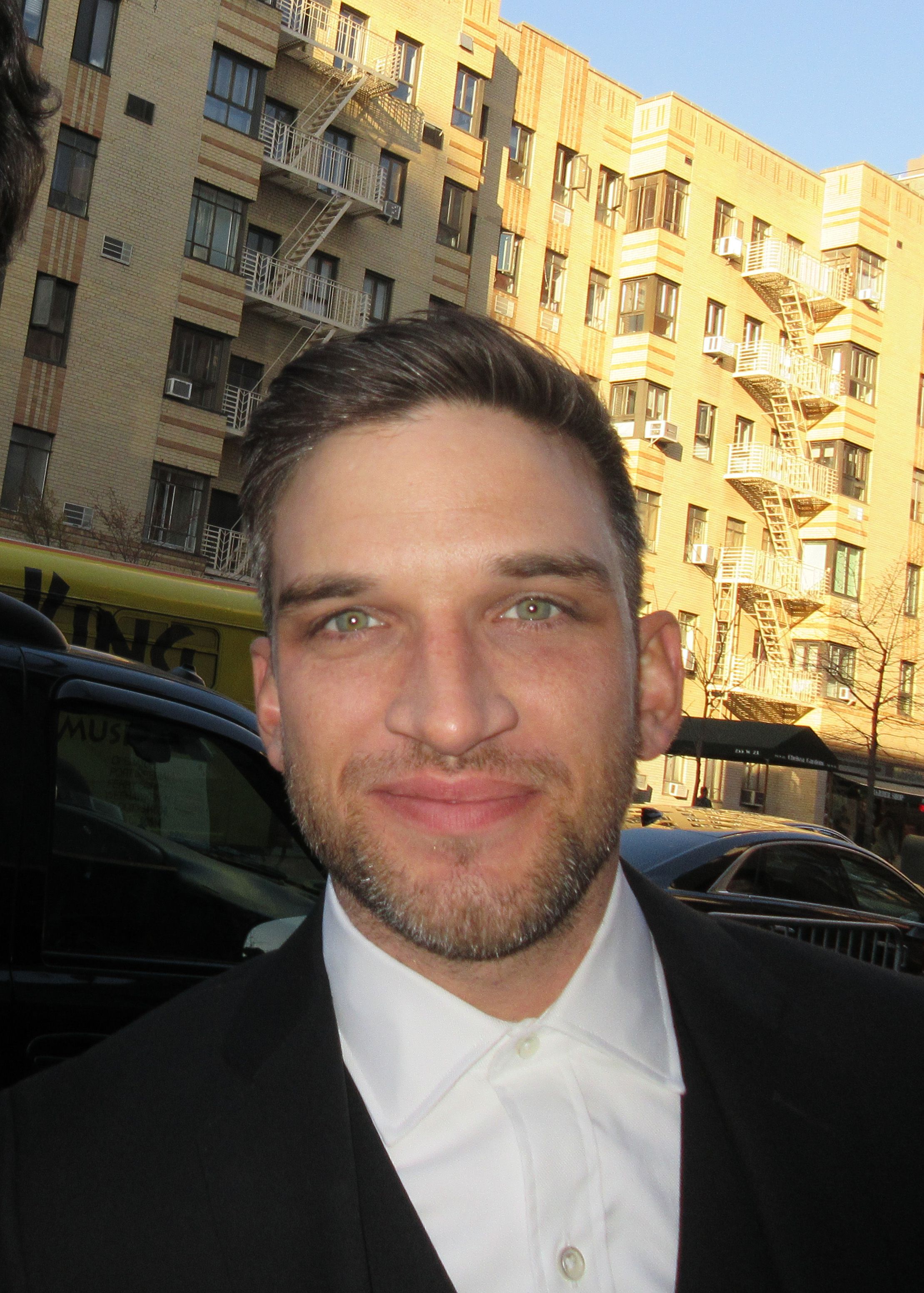
- Born: February 18, 1983 (age 43); Oyster Bay, New York, U.S.
- Occupations: Actor; producer
- Years active: 2007–present
- Spouse: Zosia Mamet (m. 2016)

Evan Jonigkeit (/ˈdʒɒnəkaɪt/; born February 18, 1983) is an American actor known for his roles in X-Men: Days of Future Past, Bone Tomahawk, and Easy.

== Early life and education ==
Jonigkeit was born in Oyster Bay, New York, and raised in Langhorne, Pennsylvania. He graduated from Neshaminy High School in 2001, and got accepted into Temple University with a baseball scholarship but after being sidelined with tendonitis, he started pursuing theater. As a young adult, Jonigkeit was employed doing lawn work. He also lived in Aurora, Illinois.

== Career ==
After working in the theater community in Philadelphia, Jonigkeit was picked up by an agency in New York. He got his break by starring in the 2011 Broadway play High which eventually led him to star in the Broadway play The Snow Geese alongside Mary-Louise Parker in 2013.

In 2014, Jonigkeit made his big-screen debut in X-Men: Days of Future Past as villain Toad.

In 2015, he starred alongside Kurt Russell in western Bone Tomahawk as Deputy Nick. In the same year he was cast to play Captain Chesterfield in Discovery Canada's series Frontier.

Jonigkeit and his production company, Rooster Films, produced their first short, Mildred & The Dying Parlor that starred Steve Buscemi and Jane Krakowski. In 2017, he produced a live event on Facebook called: Stand For Rights: A Benefit for the ACLU with Tom Hanks, for which he earned a Primetime Emmy nomination, and co-produced the ESPYs.

In 2017, Jonigkeit and Girls actress Zosia Mamet partnered with Refinery29 to produce an anthology series titled Fabled.

Jonigkeit starred on the Starz drama Sweetbitter, based on the novel of the same name. He played Will the backwaiter assigned to train Tess, who then becomes her first friend; the series premiered on May 6, 2018, and aired until 2019. In 2020, he had key roles in the horror films The Night House and The Empty Man.

Jonigkeit starred in season 1 of the Netflix series Archive 81 as Samuel Davenport, a major character and one of the main antagonists. Netflix released all eight episodes of season 1 of Archive 81 on Jan. 14, 2022. He recently played Dr. Raphael Clearwater in William Atticus Parker's 2023 film Atrabilious.

== Personal life ==
In 2013, Jonigkeit started dating actress Zosia Mamet. They married on October 2, 2016.. They announced their separation on November 20, 2026 after 10 years of marriage.15.

== Filmography ==
Key
†	Denotes works that have not yet been released

=== Film ===
Year	Title	Role	Notes
2007	Sarah + Dee	Rich Kid	Short
2008	Calendar Girl	Phil	Short
2008	Miles to Go	Kirk	Short
2010	The Gift	Mike	
2014	X-Men: Days of Future Past	Mortimer Toynbee / Toad	
2015	Bone Tomahawk	Deputy Nick	
2016	Whiskey Tango Foxtrot	Lance Corporal Coughlin	
2016	Tallulah	Nico	
2016	The Lennon Report	Dr. David Halleran	
2016	Mildred & The Dying Parlor	Howard	Short
2016	Goldbricks in Bloom	Joe	
2017	Brave New Jersey	Sparky	Phoenix Film Festival Award for Best Ensemble Acting
2018	Kate Can't Swim	Mark	Also co-director
2020	The Night House	Owen	
2020	The Empty Man	Greg	
2021	Together Together	Bryce	
2023	Somebody I Used to Know	Chef Jamie	
2023	Manodrome	Son Brad	
2025	Henry Johnson	Henry Johnson	
2025	Atrabilious	Raphael Clearwater	

=== Television ===
Year	Title	Role	Notes
2007	Mysterious Journeys	Prisoner	Episode: "Prison of Horrors: Eastern State Penitentiary"
2010	As the World Turns	Craig's Bellhop	Episode: "#1.13834"
2014	Girls	Parker	2 episodes
2014	The Good Wife	Gus Pawlicky	Episode: "Trust Issues"
2016	Broad City	Carl Schiff	Episode: "Philadelphia"
2016	Unbreakable Kimmy Schmidt	Bob Thomstein	Episode: "Kimmy Drives a Car!"
2016–2019	Easy	Matt	4 episodes
2016–2017	Frontier	Captain Jonathan Chesterfield	12 episodes
2018–2019	Sweetbitter	Will	14 episodes
2022	Archive 81	Samuel Davenport	Primary character, major role
2022–2023	Welcome to Chippendales	Scott Gariola	2 episodes
2025	The Hunting Wives	Graham O'Neil	Main cast

=== Producer ===
Year	Title	Role	Notes
2016	Mildred & The Dying Parlor	Executive producer	Short
2017	Stand For Rights: A Benefit for the ACLU with Tom Hanks	Executive producer	Live special; Nominated – Primetime Emmy Award for Outstanding Creative Achievement in Interactive Media Within an Unscripted Program
2017	Kate Can't Swim	Executive producer	
2019	Be the Ball	Executive producer	Documentary

=== Theatre ===
Year	Title	Role	Notes
2011	High	Cody Randall	Booth Theatre
2013	The Snow Geese	Duncan Gaesling	Samuel J. Friedman Theatre
2013	Really Really	Jimmy	Lucille Lortel Theater
2019	Witch	Scratch	Geffen Playhouse
