= John Hammond, Intolerant Champion =

Guinness advertisement

John Hammond, Intolerant Champion Original creative idea: Mark Nutley/Pat Hamill
- Client: Guinness
- Language: English
- Running time: 60 seconds
- Release date: 1 February 2016
- Directed by: Jake Nava
- Starring: Timothy Renouf; Lianne La Havas
- Production company: AMV BBDO, Irish International
- Country: UK

John Hammond, Intolerant Champion is a Guinness advertisement, part of the Guinness' 'Made of More' campaign, and produced in 2015 by AMV BBDO and Irish International. It is directed by Jake Nava, and stars Timothy Renouf as John Hammond, featuring alongside Lianne La Havas. The advert is narrated by Danny Glover and appears in black and white. It was released online on 1 February 2016 and on television two days later. The music is based on a remix from Sing, Sing, Sing. The sequence begins with Hammond walking into Claridges Hotel in New York to record at his radio station with his jazz band made up mainly of black musicians in the 1930s; a time they were typically segregated.

Four short supporting documentaries were produced to accompany the film. The first featured Amir Amor, the second Lady Leshurr, the third La Havas, and the fourth and final documentary featured Yannis Philippakis. Articles on the documentaries were led by The Irish Times and related each artists relation to the story of Hammond. The advertisement's intention has been seen to connect the black and white colour of Guinness with Hammond's "refined taste for music and his openness to African Americans for his love for jazz".

== Production and background ==
John Hammond, Intolerant Champion is a Guinness advertisement, produced in 2015 by AMV BBDO and Irish International, directed by Jake Nava, and launched by Diageo in 2016. The short film portrays Timothy Renouf as John Hammond, and also features Lianne La Havas and was voiced-over by Danny Glover.

Part of the Guinness' 'Made of More' campaign, it tells the story of Hammond, known for signing up black and white musicians in the 1930s, and who recruited artists such as Billie Holiday, Count Basie and Aretha Franklin. The title comes from Hammond's self-statement of how he saw himself; "the sometimes intolerant champion of tolerance". It was released online and on Instagram on 1 February 2016 and on television two days later. Four short supporting documentaries were produced to accompany the film. The first featured Amir Amor, the second Lady Leshurr, the third La Havas, and the fourth and final documentary featured Yannis Philippakis.

== Sequence ==
Hammond is depicted walking into a radio station in the 1930s, to record live on air a band consisting of black and white musicians, despite a radio station ban on black musicians being reported in the newspapers. Black people are seen dancing to jazz, and Hammond is shown socialising and laughing with them. The complete sequence lasts 60 seconds. The music is based on a remix from Benny Goodman's Sing, Sing, Sing.

== Response ==
The Irish Times led a series of articles on the supporting documentaries, beginning with how Hammond's story resonated with Amor, who had been a child asylum seeker in London.

The story was promoted on social media by La Havas. She related her own success on being "plucked from the ether" by her manager. Lady Leshurr responded to the film in the opening lines of her supporting documentary, saying that "John Hammond saw music as a force for good" ...and ... "He didn’t really care about what race or culture the music was. He was just passionate about it. That’s the same for me". The advertisement's intention has been seen to connect the black and white colour of Guinness with Hammond's "refined taste for music and his openness to African Americans for his love for jazz".

== See also ==
- Above the line (filmmaking)
