= Hal Colebatch (author) =

Australian lawyer, poet, biographer and science fiction writer

Hal Gibson Pateshall Colebatch
- Born: 7 October 1945; Perth, Western Australia
- Died: 10 September 2019 (aged 73); Perth, Western Australia
- Occupations: Author, poet, lecturer, journalist, editor, and lawyer
- Writing career
- Genres: Science fiction and history

Hal Gibson Pateshall Colebatch (7 October 1945 – 10 September 2019) was a West Australian author, historian, poet, lecturer, journalist, editor, and lawyer.

== Biography ==
Colebatch was the son and biographer of Australian politician Sir Hal Colebatch (1872 – 1953). His mother Marion, Lady Colebatch, was the daughter of long-time Fremantle mayor and parliamentarian Sir Frank Gibson, and had served as an Australian Army nursing sister.

He graduated BA Hons and MA in History/Politics and PhD in Political Science from the University of Western Australia. He later attained degrees in law and jurisprudence.

Colebatch nominated as a candidate in the 1977 and 1993 state elections for the seat of Perth as the Liberal candidate, and although he was not elected to the Legislative Assembly on either occasion, on the second attempt he came within 0.12% of winning the seat from the Australian Labor Party, which had held it since 1968.

Hal G. P. Colebatch is not to be confused with author Dr Hal K. Colebatch who was born in 1944 and has taught political science at several universities.

== Writing ==
Colebatch's work includes eight volumes of poetry (starting with Spectators on the Shore in 1975), and a series of 18 science-fiction stories published in the US in the Larry Niven series The Man-Kzin Wars. Man-Kzin Wars XII, containing three more stories by Colebatch (two written in collaboration with M. J. Harrington) was published in February 2009. He also published works of political, social, legal and economic commentary. He was described in Penguin's "A New Literary History of Australia" published in 1988, as having had "a quiet but steady career" in Australian poetry at that time. He was a regular contributor to publications including Quadrant and his 1999 book Blair's Britain was chosen in The Spectator (London) as a Book of the Year. He also contributed to The American Spectator Online, wrote op-ed articles for The Australian and occasional pieces for other publications including The Australian Financial Review, IPA Review The Salisbury Review and The New Criterion. He also wrote regular book-reviews and other features for The West Australian and The Record in Perth. His Return of the Heroes is a study of heroic fantasy including The Lord of the Rings, Star Wars and Harry Potter, and he contributed several articles to the J. R. R. Tolkien Encyclopaedia; Scholarship and Critical Assessment. He wrote biographies of Sir Victor Garland and the late Sir Stanley Argyle.

Colebatch also edited many books, including Lucky Ross, written by John Ross, an Australian Navy officer who was transferred out of HMAS Sydney 19 days before it was sunk with all hands in November 1941. He wrote commissioned histories of the Parents' and Friends Association and The Victoria League in Western Australia. He had two novels published by Acashic— Counterstrike, set in Western Australia in the near future, and Time Machine Troopers, a sequel to H. G. Wells's The Time Machine, set in 802,719 and featuring Wells himself, Winston Churchill and Lord Robert Baden-Powell as characters. Counterstrike has been described in The American Spectator Online and the Perth Record as a "thriller of ideas, one of the first books to grapple with the problems of false and manufactured counter-knowledge." (9 July 2011) Time Machine Troopers has been described as "better than Wells" and "a subversion of Wells". In 2011 Picaro Press published his small "chapbook" of poetry, The Age of Revolution, No. 113 in its Wagtail Poets series.

Poetry

Many of his poems concern Perth and its suburbs, the Swan River and Rottnest Island, as well as travels in Britain, Asia, the Middle East and elsewhere. His poetry, which has won various prizes, is in both free-verse and highly structured forms including sonnets and sestinas.

His seventh book of poetry, The Light River, with a foreword by Les Murray, was published by Connor Court Publishing in 2007. In the foreword Murray stated that Colebatch's work had been unjustly suppressed by the Australian literary establishment because of his refusal to join poetic cliques. This book contains, among other works, the long narrative poem The San Demetrio, telling of the salvaging of a burning petrol-tanker at sea in World War II, and a poem It, on the return of terrorism. The long poem Red-Head with Phosphorus is a romantic love story. His poems are included in about 25 anthologies. The Light River was awarded the West Australian Premier's literary prize for poetry in 2008.

== Other activities ==
When working as a reporter on The West Australian in the early 1970s, Colebatch made several trips to the Kimberley to report on the construction and filling of the Ord River Dam and associated animal rescues with naturalist Harry Butler, a long-time friend. He was also involved in exploring several kilometres of extensions to Easter Cave in the south-west of Western Australia. Many scenes in Man-Kzin Wars X: The Wunder War, and subsequent volumes, are set in caves and caverns, reflecting his knowledge of the subject.

Hobbies included sailing, war-gaming and underwater photography, especially at the reefs around Rottnest Island. He spent much of 1973, 1983–84 and 1997–98 in Britain, the Middle East and Europe. He also worked for the Australian Institute for Public Policy, the "dry" think-tank established by John Hyde, former MHR for Moore; and engineering tycoon Harold Clough; Debrett's publications (as managing editor) and on the staff of two federal ministers – the Hon. Sir Victor Garland and Senator the Hon. Chris Ellison. He ran his own law practice after completing articles with Stone James in Perth.

Colebatch tutored in creative writing at Curtin University, political science at the University of Western Australia, torts and contract law at Curtin University, and lectured in international law at Edith Cowan University and University of Notre Dame Australia. He was also a co-author of a book on traffic law in Western Australia, published in 2007 with Barrister Patrick Mugliston and former police sergeant Stewart Ainsworth. He had a volume of short stories accepted for publication by Acashic, and wrote a short film, Fiddler's Green.

His book Australia's Secret War won the 2014 Prime Minister's Literary Award for history, attracting significant controversy due to accusations of political bias. Among the judges for the award were Gerard Henderson and Peter Coleman. The book details strikes and purported sabotage by left-wing unions during World War II, although many of his examples were criticised for inaccuracy or for relying on unsubstantiated statements by individual servicemen.

== Death ==
Colebatch died unexpectedly in September 2019 during a stay in a Perth hospital.

== Bibliography ==
=== Novels ===
- Souvenir (Artlook Books, 1981)
- One War for Wunderland in Man-Kzin Wars No. X : The Wunder War (Baen, 2003)
- Aquilo Advenio with Matthew Joseph Harrington, in Man-Kzin Wars No. XII (Baen, 2009)
- Counterstrike (Acashic, 2011)
- Time Machine Troopers (Acashic, 2011)
- Treasure Planet with Jessica Q. Fox (Baen, 2013)
- Freedom : a Man-Kzin Novel with Jessica Q. Fox (Baen, 2020)

=== Short fiction ===
| Title | Year | First published | Length |
|---|---|---|---|
| "The Colonel's Tiger" | 1995 | Man-Kzin Wars VII edited by Larry Niven, Baen | novella |
| "Telepath's Dance" | 1998 | Choosing Names edited by Larry Niven, Baen | novella |
| "His Sergeant's Honor" | 2002 | Man-Kzin Wars IX edited by Larry Niven, Baen | novella |
| "The Corporal in the Caves" | 2003 | Man-Kzin Wars X: The Wunder War by Hal Colebatch, Baen | novelette |
| "Music Box" | 2003 | Man-Kzin Wars X: The Wunder War by Hal Colebatch, Baen | novelette |
| "Peter Robinson" | 2003 | Man-Kzin Wars X: The Wunder War by Hal Colebatch, Baen | novelette |
| "Three at the Table" | 2005 | Man-Kzin Wars XI edited by Larry Niven, Baen | novelette |
| "Grossgeister Swamp" | 2005 | Man-Kzin Wars XI edited by Larry Niven, Baen | novella |
| "Catspaws" | 2005 | Man-Kzin Wars XI edited by Larry Niven, Baen | novella |
| "String" with Matthew Joseph Harrington | 2009 | Man-Kzin Wars XII edited by various, Baen | novella |
| "The Trooper and the Triangle" | 2009 | Man-Kzin Wars XII edited by various, Baen | novelette |
| "Misunderstanding" with Jessica Q. Fox | 2012 | Man-Kzin Wars XIII edited by various, Baen | short story |
| "A Man Named Saul" with Jessica Q. Fox | 2013 | Man-Kzin Wars XIV edited by Larry Niven, Baen | novella |
| "The Marmalade Problem" | 2013 | Man-Kzin Wars XIV edited by Larry Niven, Baen | short story |
| "The White Column" | 2013 | Man-Kzin Wars XIV edited by Larry Niven, Baen | short story |
| "Deadly Knowledge" | 2013 | Man-Kzin Wars XIV edited by Larry Niven, Baen | short story |
| "Sales Pitch" | 2019 | Man-Kzin Wars XV edited by Larry Niven, Baen | short story |
| "Excitement" with Jessica Q. Fox | 2019 | Man-Kzin Wars XV edited by Larry Niven, Baen | short story |

=== Poetry ===
Collections

- Spectators on the Shore (1975)
- In Breaking Waves (1979)
- Outer Charting (1985)
- The Earthquake Lands (1990)
- The Stonehenge Syndrome (1993)
- Primary Loyalties : Poems of Politics and Society (1999)
- The Light River, Connor Court, 2007}
- The Age of Revolution and Other Poems (2011)

Selected list of poems

| Title | Year | First published | Reprinted/collected |
|---|---|---|---|
| Castle in Lebanon | 1996 | Colebatch, Hal (March 1996). "Castle in Lebanon". Quadrant. 40 (3 [324]): 62. | |
| Weekday | 1996 | Colebatch, Hal (March 1996). "Weekday". Quadrant. 40 (3 [324]): 62. | |
| Janice B. | 2018 | Colebatch, Hal G. P. (January–February 2018). "Janice B.". Quadrant. 62 (1–2 [543]): 86. | |

=== Non-fiction ===
- Claude de Bernales: The Magnificent Miner: A Biography, Carlisle, W.A. : Hesperian Press, 1996. ISBN 0-85905-200-1
- Blair's Britain : British Culture Wars and New Labour (1999) was chosen as a Book of the Year by the London Spectator.
- "Reigning cats". Quadrant. 47 (7–8 [398]): 86–87. July–August 2003.
- Return of the Heroes : The Lord of the Rings, Star Wars, Harry Potter, and Social Conflict, Cybereditions Corporation, 2003. ISBN 978-1-877275-57-9
- Steadfast Knight: A Life of Sir Hal Colebatch with a foreword by Geoffrey Blainey. Fremantle, W.A. : Fremantle Arts Centre Press, 2004. ISBN 1-920731-39-3 (biography of his father)
- Caverns of Magic (Cybereditions, 2006), a survey of caves in myth, legend and story, and of the development of speleology, with a foreword by naturalist and conservationist Harry Butler
- Good work and friendship : the Victoria League for Commonwealth Friendship in Western Australia 1909-2009, Victoria League, 2010.
- The Modest Member, the official biography of Bert Kelly MHR, Connor Court Publishing, 2012
- Australia's Secret War: How Unionists Sabotaged Our Troops in World War II, Quadrant Books, 2013. ISBN 978-0-980677-87-4
- Fragile Flame : The Uniqueness and Vulnerability of Scientific and Technological Civilization, Acashic, 2013

=== Selected book reviews ===
| Year | Review article | Work(s) reviewed |
|---|---|---|
| 2018 | Colebatch, Hal G. P. (January–February 2018). "Unreasonable reasoning". Quadrant. 62 (1–2 [543]): 83–85. | Kreeft, Peter (2006). Socrates meets Descartes : the Father of Philosophy analyzes the Father of Modern Philosophy's Discourse on Method. Ignatius Press. |
