= Henry Johnson (film) =

- Directed by: David Mamet
- Written by: David Mamet
- Based on: Henry Johnson by David Mamet
- Produced by: Lije Sarki; Evan Jonigkeit
- Starring: Shia LaBeouf; Evan Jonigkeit
- Cinematography: Sing Howe Yam
- Edited by: Evan "Banner" Gwin
- Music by: Jay Wadley
- Production company: 1993
- Distributed by: 1993
- Release date: May 9, 2025
- Running time: 85 minutes
- Country: United States
- Language: English

Henry Johnson is a 2025 American prison drama film written and directed by David Mamet and starring Shia LaBeouf and Evan Jonigkeit. It is based on Mamet's 2023 play.

== Synopsis ==
The synopsis of the plot appears on RogerEbert.com describing the opening to the film stating that: "The first half hour or so of Mamet’s new film, 'Henry Johnson,' adapted from a recent theatrical work, is the playwright undistilled. Evan Jongkeit, a fine actor who’s incidentally Mamet’s son-in-law (he’s married to actress Zosia Mamet), plays the title role. When we meet him, he’s a besuited, buttoned-up lawyer called in to confer with his boss, Mr. Barnes (Chris Bauer). The conversation seems at first to be about abortion, and one might be bracing for a form of polemic to emerge, but it doesn’t. The topic is actually why Henry is invested in securing top-flight legal representation for a certain party, but the punchline, after reams of crips, elliptical Mamet dialogue, is what lands Henry in a prison cell".

== Cast ==
- Shia LaBeouf as Gene, in prison related to murder charges
- Evan Jonigkeit as Henry Johnson, an attorney asked to represent Gene
- Chris Bauer as Mr. Barnes, managing attorney at Henry's law firm
- Dominic Hoffman as Jerry

== Production ==
In April 2025, it was announced that production on the film wrapped.

== Release ==
The film premiered at the Aero Theatre in Los Angeles on May 9, 2025. It is also currently available to rent via the film's website as of May 9.

== Reception ==
The film holds a 62% rating on Rotten Tomatoes based on 37 reviews, with an average rating of 5.6/10. The website's critics consensus reads, "Henry Johnson exhibits David Mamet's penchant for memorable dialogue, delivering a string of terrifically-acted set pieces that can be as punishing for the audience as they are for Evan Jonigkeit's titular character." On Metacritic, the film holds a weighted average score of 58/100 based on ten critics, indicating "mixed or average" reviews.

Christian Zilko of IndieWire graded the film a C+. Glenn Kenny of RogerEbert.com awarded the film three stars. Julian Roman of MovieWeb awarded the film two stars out of five. Jacob Oller of The A.V. Club graded the film a C. David Robb of Slant Magazine awarded the film one and a half stars out of four.

David Rooney of The Hollywood Reporter gave the film a positive review and wrote as the bottom line, "Mamet's writing can still crackle like wildfire."

Nick Schager of The Daily Beast also gave the film a positive review and wrote that its "staginess is offset by their blistering investigation of morality, manipulation, individual and social responsibility, and masculine power."

Alex Maidy of JoBlo.com also gave the film a positive review and wrote, “Rather than being impressive like a magician performing a trick, it becomes repetitive. Overall, Henry Johnson is an intriguing story worth watching for the phenomenal supporting performances.”

Owen Gleiberman of Variety gave the film a negative review and wrote, "Mamet wants to take us out of our comfort zone. But he's created his own rarefied discomfort zone of self-indulgence posing as importance."
