= Adelind Horan =

American actress

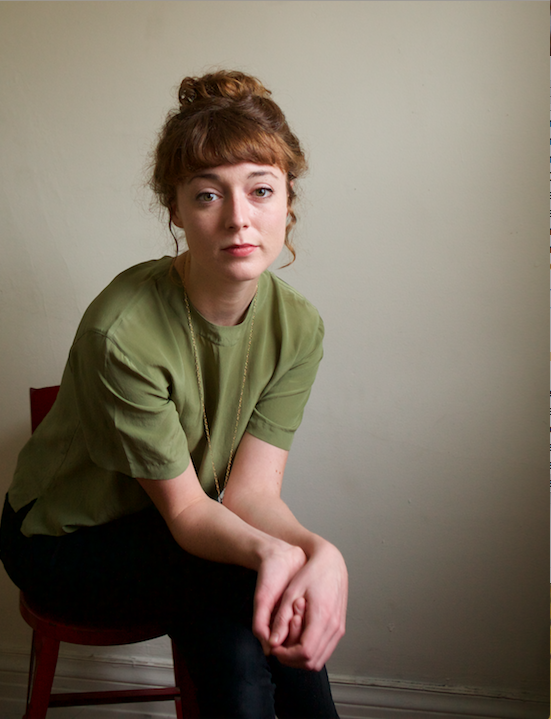
Adelind Horan

Adelind Horan is an American film, theatre, and television actress and writer. She is best known for portraying Billy Ann Baker in the Amazon Prime Video series The Peripheral, and for her documentary solo play about mountaintop removal in Appalachia, Cry of the Mountain.

== Early life ==
Horan grew up outside of Charlottesville, Virginia, acting in local theatre productions. Her parents, Lydia Horan and Michael Horan, are both actors. She attended high school at Tandem Friends School and college at Hampshire College.

== Sources ==
- Collins-Hughes, Laura (14 June 2015). "Review: 'The Old Masters,' Art Found, Artist Lost and Another Adrift". The New York Times.
