= Willie Cornish =

American jazz musician (1875–1942)

- Cornish circa 1905
- Born: August 1. 1875
- Died: January 12, 1942 (aged 66)
- Occupation: Musician
- Known for: Valve trombone player in the Buddy Bolden band

William Cornish (August 1, 1875 – January 12, 1942) was an early jazz musician – known for his being very active on the New Orleans scene playing, leading bands, and teaching music for decades.

== Career ==
He was a member of Buddy Bolden's pioneering New Orleans style band, playing valve trombone, from about the late 1890s until 1903 or 1905, with a short break when he fought in the Spanish–American War. He was also an early member of the Eureka Brass Band. When he had a stroke which paralyzed his left side before the summer of 1931, he contrived a way of holding his trombone in place with a strap so that he could continue playing.
