= Alex Hernandez (actor) =

American actor

- Born: Alex Hernandez
- Occupation: Actor
- Years active: 2013–present

Alex Hernandez is an American actor who is best known for his regular roles on Unreal (2018), The Peripheral (2022) and Sugar (2024) and his voice role and performance capture as Lincoln Clay on Mafia III (2016).

== Filmography ==
=== Film ===
Year	Title	Role	Notes
2013	Fireflies	Gas Station Attendant	
2014	Samuel's Game	Mikey	
2015	Millie and the Lords	Roberto	
2019	Mo	Tudor (voice)	
2020	Bloodshot	Tibbs	
2020	Posthumous	Erel	Short
2026	The Rip	Hialeah Patrolman Warwick	

=== Television ===
Year	Title	Role	Notes
2013	Blue Bloods	Tiny	Episode: "Warriors"
2013	Alpha House	Soldier #1	Episode: "All Weapons Red"
2013	Law & Order: Special Victims Unit	Pablo Desparo	Episode: "Strange Beauty"
2014	Law & Order: Special Victims Unit	Carlos 'O.G.' Hernandez	Recurring Cast: Season 15
2014	Black Box	Manuel	Recurring Cast
2015	Hemlock Grove	Isaac Ochoa	Recurring Cast: Season 3
2016	Blindspot	Mike	Episode: "Cease Forcing Enemy"
2016	Power	Napi	Episode: "Call Me James"
2016	Chicago Med	Javier	Episode: "Win Loss"
2017	Elena of Avalor	Manuel (voice)	Episode: "Royal Rivalry"
2018	Unreal	Owen Boyd	Main Cast: Season 3
2018	Strangers	Javier	Episode: "The Big (Gr)apple"
2019	New Amsterdam	Zuhrah's Father	Episode: "The Forsaken"
2019	The Son	Ulises Gonzales	Recurring Cast: Season 2
2019–20	The Resident	Dr. Ed Torres	Recurring Cast: Season 3
2021	Search Party	Gustave	Recurring Cast: Season 4
2021	Invasion	Chavez	Recurring Cast: Season 1
2022	The Peripheral	Tommy Constantine	Main Cast
2024	Sugar	Kenny	Main Cast: Season 1
2025	Gremlins	Chupacabra (voice)	Episode: "Never Try the Cider"

=== Video games ===
Year	Title	Role	Note
2016	Tom Clancy's The Division	Additional voices	
2016	Mafia III	Lincoln Clay	Voice and likeness
2016	The Walking Dead: A New Frontier	David García	Voice
2017	Batman: The Enemy Within	Eli Knable	Voice
2018	Command and Conquer: Rivals	Additional voices	
2022	Gotham Knights	Additional voices	
2023	Creed: Rise to Glory - Championship Edition	Felix Chavez	Voice
2025	MindsEye	Jacob Diaz	Voice and likeness
