= Jerusalem Ablaze: Stories of Love and Other Obsessions =

2017 collection of short stories by Orlando Ortega-Medina

- Author: Orlando Ortega-Medina
- Cover artist: La Boca
- Language: English
- Subject: Fiction
- Genre: Literary (Short Stories)
- Set in: Various Locales
- Publisher: Cloud Lodge Books
- Publication date: 2017
- Media type: Print
- Pages: 184 pp
- ISBN: 978-0-9954657-0-1
- Website: www.cloudlodgebooks.com

Jerusalem Ablaze: Stories of Love and Other Obsessions is a debut collection of thirteen short stories written by Orlando Ortega-Medina. Ortega-Medina was born in California and his stories originate from his time spent living in the United States, Israel, Japan, and Quebec.

== Reception ==
Jerusalem Ablaze: Stories of Love and Other Obsessions has been reviewed in The Irish News, the Aberdeen Press and Journal, and in Jewish Renaissance. The work has also been reviewed positively by Kirkus Reviews, BookMunch, and Breakaway Reviewers.

== Stories ==
The collection commences with “Torture by Roses. Set in modern Tokyo, “Torture by Roses” tells the story of Ikeda Yataro, a wealthy industrialist and patron of the arts who offers to adopt a talented university student to be the sole heir to his vast fortune. He sets only three conditions on his offer. Violation of any of the conditions is grounds for automatic revocation of the inheritance. The student enthusiastically agrees to the arrangement, but soon finds that the price exacted by Ikeda is more than he can bear.

“After the Storm” tells the story of the fragile wife of a lighthouse keeper deliberately left alone by her husband to tend to the lighthouse during a week-long storm. The storm clears long enough for the woman to spot an unusually large mound of seaweed that draws her out of the lighthouse and onto the shoreline to inspect it. What she finds upon reaching the mound unhinges her.

A young wife suffers nightly beatings at the hands of her alcoholic husband until her debilitating depression and submissiveness converge to give her the strength to take control in “And a Little Child Shall Lead Them.”

In "The Shovelist" an aging ex-serviceman in Magog, Quebec, desperately tries to sell his snow-shovelling services to his sceptical new neighbours, a gay couple recently arrived from Toronto.

An unpublished young writer and a well-known author are the protagonists in “Cactuses”. The young man's scheme to solicit the influence of the famous man are thrown off when the author abruptly reveals that he is dying.

“An Israel State of Mind”, is a story about a young man from Southern California, just graduated from High School, who arrives in Israel to spend a year working on a regimented kibbutz in the hopes of escaping his sexuality.

The collection concludes with "Jerusalem Ablaze", which is set in Jerusalem's Old City and involves a sexual encounter between a young priest and a middle-aged prostitute, with disastrous consequences.

== Contents ==
- Torture by Roses
- Eyesore in the Ginza
- After the Storm
- The Shovelist
- Tiger at Beaufort Point
- Cactuses
- Invitation to the Dominant Culture
- Love at Masada
- And a Little Child Shall Lead Them
- Star Party
- An Israel State of Mind, Part 1
- An Israel State of Mind, Part 2
- Jerusalem Ablaze

== Awards ==
On 31 July 2017, Jerusalem Ablaze: Stories of Love and Other Obsessions was shortlisted for the Polari First Book Prize 2017.

On 7 April 2017, Jerusalem Ablaze: Stories of Love and Other Obsessions won the Independent Publisher Book Awards Bronze Medal for Cover Design - Fiction.
