= Jake Nava =

British director

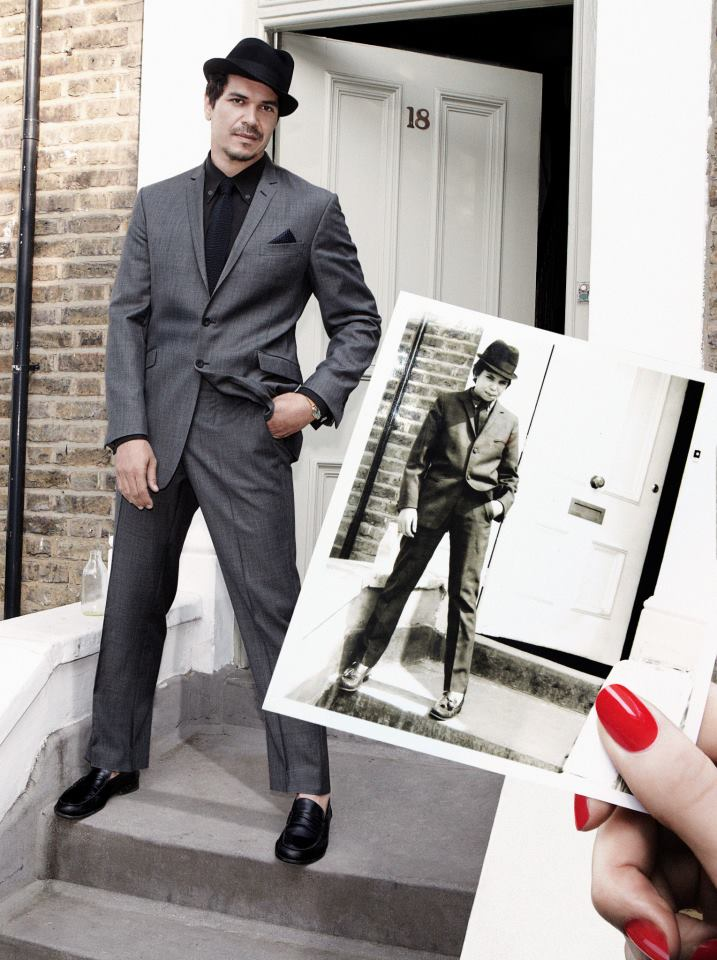
Jake Nava in 2012

Jake Nava is a British director, mostly known for his work in music videos for Beyoncé, Arctic Monkeys, Adele, Britney Spears and The Rolling Stones. He also directs TV commercials, notably for Guinness and Levi Strauss & Co.

He is the older half-brother of fellow director Emil Nava.

== Early life and education ==
Nava described himself to Complex magazine as "kind of mixed in race". He was born and brought up in North London to a father of Afro-Mexican ancestry and a mother of Austrian and Dutch descent. His cousins lived in Los Angeles in the USA and he "felt a genuine bond to that American culture, and I had always loved hip-hop, which, in those days, was American music." He graduated with a degree in film from the University of Westminster.

== Career ==
After college, he began his career directing music videos and films for MTV Sports. Nava has created videos for various artists, including Tina Turner, Spice Girls, Arctic Monkeys, Adele, Britney Spears, Lindsay Lohan, Atomic Kitten, Enrique Iglesias, Usher, Pink, Snow Patrol, Shakira, Kelis, Mariah Carey, Natalie Imbruglia, Natasha Bedingfield, The Cranberries, System of a Down, Leona Lewis, Blaque, Mis-Teeq, Little Boots, Beyoncé, and Rolling Stones. Nava has also directed advertising campaigns for Armani, Puma, Bacardi, and more. In 2013, Nava directed three music videos for Beyoncé's visual album ("Partition", "Grown Woman", and "Flawless").

In 2014, Nava collaborated with Lana Del Rey on "Shades of Cool". In 2015, he directed his first commercial for Guinness, titled Intolerant Champion. In 2016, Nava directed Martini's Play with Time, and a second spot for Guinness, titled We Are Made of Football. In 2017, he directed campaigns for Bacardi, Mastercard, Vauxhall "Pyjama Mamas" for Mother, Levi's "Circles".

Nava continued to collaborate with Beyoncé in 2020 on her film Black Is King and in 2021 directed a short film featuring Usher for Rémy Martin called Team Up for Excellence.

== See also ==
- John Hammond, Intolerant Champion
