= List of American Housewife episodes =

American Housewife is an American sitcom television series that debuted on October 11, 2016, on ABC, starring Katy Mixon, Diedrich Bader, Meg Donnelly, Daniel DiMaggio, Julia Butters (seasons 1–4), Ali Wong, and Carly Hughes (seasons 1–4). Giselle Eisenberg replaces Julia Butters as of season 5. Hughes exited the series after appearing in the season 5 premiere, which was scripted as the season 4 finale. The series is created and written by Sarah Dunn who is co-executive producer with Aaron Kaplan, Kenny Schwartz, Rick Wiener, Ruben Fleischer, and Kapital Entertainment–ABC Studios co-production. On May 10, 2019, ABC renewed the series for a fourth season. In May 2020, the series was renewed for a fifth season, which premiered on October 28, 2020. The series aired its 100th episode on February 24, 2021.

On May 14, 2021, ABC canceled the series after five seasons. The cancellation was somewhat unexpected, as season 5 ended with multiple cliffhangers.

During the course of the series, 103 episodes of American Housewife aired over five seasons, between October 11, 2016, and March 31, 2021.

== Series overview ==
Season	Episodes	Originally released	
Season	Episodes	First released	Last released
1	23	October 11, 2016	May 16, 2017
2	24	September 27, 2017	May 16, 2018
3	23	September 26, 2018	May 21, 2019
4	20	September 27, 2019	May 13, 2020
5	13	October 28, 2020	March 31, 2021

== Episodes ==
=== Season 1 (2016–17) ===
No. overall	No. in season	Title	Directed by	Written by	Original release date	Prod. code	U.S. viewers (millions)
1	1	"Pilot"	Ruben Fleischer	Sarah Dunn	October 11, 2016	101	6.61
After the second-fattest housewife in Westport moves out of the Otto family's neighborhood, Katie tries to ensure that another heavyset woman moves into the home to avoid moving up to the #2 spot herself.
2	2	"The Nap"	John Fortenberry	Sarah Dunn	October 18, 2016	102	5.75
Greg's sickness, Taylor's class schedule, and Oliver's insider trading in his school stock market club conspire to thwart Katie's plans to take a nap for the first time in a long while.
3	3	"Westport Zombies"	Chris Koch	Julie Bean	October 25, 2016	103	5.20
Upset over Taylor spending so much time with new neighbor Viv, Katie tells Viv that she plans to participate in the annual Westport Zombie Run, with the intention of beating Viv and winning her daughter back.
4	4	"Art Show"	Ken Whittingham	Donald Diego	November 1, 2016	105	5.10
When Anna-Kat submits a family drawing for a local children's art fair that portrays her mom as huge and round, Katie goes to great lengths to get it replaced with something else. While she is out, Katie leaves Doris in charge of the kids, and they don't react well to her much stricter parenting style. Meanwhile, Greg has an idea for an article that he thinks will finally earn him tenure, but his writing routine is constantly interrupted by family members.
5	5	"The Snub"	Ryan Case	Rick Wiener & Kenny Schwartz	November 15, 2016	106	5.28
Katie tries to fit in with the other Westport moms in order to get Anna-Kat invited to a popular girl's birthday party. When Anna-Kat still isn't invited, Katie vents to Angela and Doris, and realizes her daughter doesn't need a bunch of friends, just a couple of close ones. Elsewhere, Greg tries to convince Taylor that she can't get by on her athletic ability alone, while Oliver complains about a flawed polo shirt that his mom bought at an outlet store.
6	6	"The Blow-Up"	Eyal Gordin	Vanessa McCarthy	November 22, 2016	104	6.14
Katie's mother Kathryn (Wendie Malick) shows up for Thanksgiving, and typically wants to be the center of attention. Just prior, Katie met with Anna-Kat's teacher, who said Anna-Kat is more anxious than normal, and Katie realizes her own anxiety over her mother is affecting her daughter. Also, an unwanted guest (Viv) crashes the Otto family Thanksgiving.
7	7	"Power Couple"	Ryan Case	Sam Sklaver	November 29, 2016	108	5.59
Katie learns that Dr. Ellie, Anna-Kat's special needs teacher, is in danger of being laid off because budget dollars may be reallocated to new parking lot lights. After she and Doris work to get Greg elected to an open PTA seat, they must then try to line up votes at the next PTA mixer. Meanwhile, Taylor and Oliver deal with the aftermath of watching a scary movie.
8	8	"Westport Cotillion"	Rebecca Asher	Julie Bean	December 6, 2016	109	5.06
As Katie tries to keep better tabs on what her children are doing, Oliver tells Greg that he's secretly taking cotillion classes. With the cotillion dance event coming soon, Oliver asks Dad to keep the secret from Katie, fearing that Mom will show up at the dance and embarrass him.
9	9	"Krampus Katie"	David Grossman	Brian Donavan & Ed Herro	December 13, 2016	107	5.32
When Katie angrily refuses Viv's help in decorating the Otto house for Christmas and is reluctant to help Viv with the school's Christmas show, Anna-Kat sees her mother as Krampus, the demon who punishes misbehaving children during the holidays. Meanwhile, Greg tries to teach Taylor and Oliver about the true meaning of Christmas by forcing them to visit elderly residents at an assisted living facility, but it backfires.
10	10	"The Playdate"	Declan Lowney	Donald Diego	January 3, 2017	111	5.62
The Ottos are surprised when Anna-Kat gets invited to a playdate with the daughter of Chloe Brown Mueller (Jessica St. Clair), a known gossip who posts ratings of her daughter's playdates on social media. The playdate goes surprisingly well, but Katie and Greg later find that Anna-Kat stole a silver candlestick from the Mueller house. Elsewhere, Oliver is always on the phone and Taylor is convinced he has a new girlfriend. She tails him after one of the calls and finds something entirely different going on.
11	11	"The Snowstorm"	Chad Lowe	Stephanie Birkitt	January 10, 2017	110	5.93
The family camping trip Greg has planned is cancelled when a snowstorm knocks out power to the Otto home, so he uses the blackout to set up a "camping at home" experience. Katie takes refuge at Viv's house, which has backup generators. After discovering that Viv is lying about her husband's affection to keep up appearances, Katie also learns how Viv's first marriage ended and realizes she has to share Greg's interests once in a while.
12	12	"Surprise"	Stuart McDonald	Vanessa McCarthy	January 17, 2017	112	5.47
Oliver insists he doesn't want a birthday party with friends because he's embarrassed over the size and amenities in the Otto home, but Katie and Greg throw one anyway with an escape room. Despite some problems, the party winds up working in Oliver's favor. Meanwhile, Taylor starts to get romantic with her classmate and new math tutor, which angers the boy's adoptive mom.
13	13	"Then and Now"	John Fortenberry	Rick Wiener & Kenny Schwartz & Sarah Dunn	February 7, 2017	113	5.40
The Ottos return home to find their house has been put up for sale. As they cannot afford to buy or rent any other home in the Westport area, they are forced to consider moving. This thrills Katie, until she sees how much Greg and the kids want to stay. Katie and Greg learn that the man who wants to sell the house did not get permission to do so from the actual owner (his mother). They track down the owner (Jenny O'Hara), who tells them they can stay and pay their current rent as long as they want.
14	14	"Time for Love"	Declan Lowney	Rick Wiener & Kenny Schwartz	February 14, 2017	116	5.33
Knowing that Greg is preparing his usual over-the-top Valentine's Day surprise for her, Katie tells him she doesn't want anything, but is later disappointed when Greg actually honors her request. At school, Oliver has gotten a gift for his crush Alice only to be shunned, not knowing that Anna-Kat has intervened. Meanwhile, Taylor plays her parents off each other to be able to attend a Valentine's party where there is no adult supervision.
15	15	"The Man Date"	Melissa Kosar	Donald Diego	February 21, 2017	115	5.21
Katie finds it hard to put aside her ongoing feud with Chloe Brown Mueller when Greg becomes good friends with Chloe's husband, Stan (Timothy Omundson). Meanwhile, Taylor learns that Anna-Kat is being bullied at school, but the advice she gives her little sister turns Anna-Kat into the bully.
16	16	"Bag Lady"	John Putch	Vanessa McCarthy & Julie Bean	March 7, 2017	118	5.19
After her family confesses to giving Katie the unflattering nickname "Colonel Beatrix Von Beige Underpants Control Freak", she tries to back off and let them run their own lives for a while. It seems she isn't needed when Oliver helps Anna-Kat sell bunches of panda paintings for charity and Greg helps Taylor find a sporting activity she can do while her ankle heals. But it's not long before all ask for Katie's help again. Meanwhile, Katie goes to war with big box store manager Ian (Larry Joe Campbell) over defective garbage bags.
17	17	"Other People's Marriages"	John Fortenberry	Donald Diego	March 14, 2017	117	4.90
When Viv proclaims her husband Alan (Jay Mohr) has cut off her credit cards, Katie suggests she stand up to him, despite Greg's advice that she stay out of other people's marriages. The result is that Viv leaves Alan and moves in with the Ottos. Meanwhile, Greg tries to find a way to discipline Oliver and Taylor for constantly leaving cupboards and drawers open.
18	18	"The Otto Motto"	Phil Traill	Brian Donovan & Ed Herro	April 4, 2017	119	4.39
Taylor quits synchronized swimming and takes up drama. When she soon wants to quit drama, Greg and Katie remind her of the "Otto Motto" which is "never give up". This backfires on Katie when Greg reminds her of all the things she started and quit, including learning French in advance of their dream vacation to Paris. Meanwhile, Oliver has put together an attainment board with a collage of shirtless male models and also takes up ballet, causing Katie, Doris and Angela to think he might be gay.
19	19	"The Polo Match"	Linda Mendoza	Stephanie Birkitt	April 11, 2017	120	4.31
Katie gets a visit from her childhood friend Billy (Will Sasso), and tries to show him that Westport hasn't changed her. But when she attends a charity polo match at Doris' request, Katie can't help but see that she's started to finally warm up to her surroundings. Meanwhile, Oliver is tired of Billy pranking him every time he visits, and plots to get back at him with Greg's help.
20	20	"The Walk"	Chris Koch	Rick Wiener & Kenny Schwartz	April 18, 2017	121	4.49
Katie and Greg reluctantly agree to let Anna-Kat walk two blocks alone to the library as an 8th birthday present, something they promised her when she was 5. When this gets Katie shunned by other Westport moms for being a bad parent, Oliver's uber-rich friend Cooper (Logan Pepper), whom Katie dislikes, surprisingly steps up to defend her. Meanwhile, Greg is more worried about Taylor's relationship with boyfriend Eyo (Amarr M. Wooten), which is starting to get physical.
21	21	"The Club"	David Bertman	Brian Donovan & Ed Herro	May 2, 2017	114	4.43
Katie wants to take a dip in the country club pool with Anna-Kat, who has become afraid of water after reading a book about a disastrous flood. But Katie has her own fear to overcome: wearing a bathing suit in front of the judgmental Westport moms. Oliver tries to help Greg improve his score on a website where college students rate their professors. Meanwhile, Taylor has to learn to say "no" when Doris repeatedly asks her to babysit her daughter, Marigold (Miya Cech).
22	22	"Dude, Where's My Napkin?"	Melissa Kosar	Julie Bean & Vanessa McCarthy	May 9, 2017	122	4.29
Angela's ex-wife Celeste (Tiffani Thiessen), an editor, helps Greg land his first book deal, leading to them and Katie going out on the town. Angela is mad over Katie socializing with her ex, and accuses Katie of being a bad friend. During the drunken night out, Greg misplaces the napkin that contained the "perfect opening statement" for his book. Meanwhile, the Otto kids realize they can use their mom's blurred memories to convince her that she agreed to buy them a trampoline, but the selfish Anna-Kat usurps them by saying it was a puppy her mom agreed to.
23	23	"Can't Hide it Anymore"	John Putch	Sarah Dunn	May 16, 2017	123	4.39
Katie borrows a sympathy belly from Angela to appear pregnant, allowing her to get out of fulfilling her remaining parent volunteer hours at the school. Anna-Kat rebels against being Katie's favorite, after she learns how much it annoys her brother and sister. Greg and Katie discover that Taylor has two Instagram accounts: one that her parents can see, and a second on which she posts racier photos of herself. Oliver continues to pursue ballet as a way to get into Harvard, but his first performance reveals just how much of a "beginners" class he's in.

=== Season 2 (2017–18) ===
No. overall	No. in season	Title	Directed by	Written by	Original release date	Prod. code	U.S. viewers (millions)
24	1	"Back to School"	Chris Koch	Rick Wiener & Kenny Schwartz	September 27, 2017	201	5.66
In order to show her kids she will share the commitment to effort that she expects from them, Katie volunteers for perhaps the most stressful assignment at the school — chairing the annual Spring Gala. Meanwhile, Oliver is being singled out and treated with disdain by his ballet teacher, causing Katie to confront the woman.
25	2	"Boar-Dain"	Rebecca Asher	Brian Donovan & Ed Herro	October 4, 2017	202	4.96
Having to make a presentation on the Spring Gala theme in front of dozens of parents, Katie feels like she can just wing it. However, when her initial idea for a beach party theme meets with resistance, she instead uses Oliver's idea of a Bollywood theme, which will be much harder to pull off. Greg makes an impulsive purchase of a special grill that he plans to use for roasting a pig, but his first attempt does not go well and he keeps the pig as a pet. Greg also pushes Eyo to convince Taylor to go to college, but Taylor instead inspires Eyo to follow his dream of being a manga cartoonist, upsetting his mother, Tara, greatly.
26	3	"The Uprising"	John Putch	Donald Diego	October 11, 2017	203	5.02
Oliver has an embarrassing incident in ballet class, which has Greg recounting some of his most embarrassing moments. When this fails to console Oliver, Katie causes public embarrassment for Greg while he does a reading from his upcoming book. Meanwhile, Tara tries to get revenge on Katie by turning Anna-Kat into a vegan.
27	4	"The Lice Storm"	Ken Whittingham	Bill Callahan	October 18, 2017	204	5.11
The Ottos get a letter saying a sweet innocent student at the school has lice and soon realize it's Anna-Kat. Greg and Katie also become concerned when Oliver befriends neighbor Spencer Blitz (George Hamilton), a one-time billionaire investor who has just returned home after being out on house arrest after spending 20 years in Federal prison. Meanwhile, Katie wonders where the time went when she learns Taylor will be driving soon, and tries to force her oldest child to spend time with her.
28	5	"Boo-Who?"	Melissa Kosar	Kat Likkel & John Hoberg	October 25, 2017	205	4.75
Having given up on the possibility that her family will ever be "booed" (where a neighbor places a ghost placard on someone's door and leaves a gift basket), Katie is shocked when she is booed by Chloe Brown Mueller. Meanwhile, Oliver enlists Anna-Kat's help to cure him of his girlish scream, so that he won't embarrass himself at an upcoming haunted house party.
29	6	"The Pig Whisperer"	Rebecca Asher	Sarah Dunn	November 1, 2017	207	4.53
When Katie insists that Greg get rid of Hans Gruber, Greg tries to show her the pig can become more well-behaved by hiring Dirk the Pig Whisperer (Derek Theler). Meanwhile, Oliver faces competition for Spencer's attention (and money) when Viv sees the rich old man as a way back to her old social status. Also, Taylor considers dating a senior behind Eyo's back.
30	7	"Family Secrets"	Melissa Kosar	Rick Wiener & Kenny Schwartz	November 15, 2017	209	4.89
Greg tries to put up a proper front for his visiting father (Barry Bostwick) and mother (Julia Duffy) on Thanksgiving, but the surprise arrival of Katie's mother and Spencer, plus a video Anna-Kat makes for school, exposes some family secrets. Meanwhile, Taylor ponders how to respond to Eyo's "I love you" text, and Oliver starts to see Spencer as more than just a man with money.
31	8	"Gala Auction"	John Putch	Kat Likkel & John Hoberg	November 29, 2017	206	4.51
Katie brags about how well she is doing getting prize donations for the Spring Gala, but Oliver and his friend Cooper Bradford insist that the prizes are lame and not something the highbrow parents in Westport will appreciate. Katie then tries to get some of the wealthy parents to donate private jet rides and trips to vacation homes, but Tara tells her such prizes are quid pro quo and Katie has nothing to offer in return. Oliver steps in with an idea that just might work, but it goes against everything Katie believes. Elsewhere, Greg takes Taylor and Anna-Kat to a Revolutionary War battle reenactment, but Taylor rebels after learning that women are only allowed to be nurses.
32	9	"The Couple"	John Putch	Taylor Hamra	December 6, 2017	208	4.52
Greg and Katie befriend childless couple Zach (Ryan Hansen) and Courtney (Fiona Gubelmann), and try to keep up a ruse that they don't have kids either, for fear of losing them. At home, Anna-Kat coerces Taylor and Oliver into helping her with a storytelling project.
33	10	"Blue Christmas"	Ken Whittingham	Lindsey Stoddart	December 13, 2017	210	4.79
The Otto family Christmas traditions are put on hold when Doris goes into labor and requests Katie's presence at the hospital. Unwilling to wait for Katie to open their presents, the kids and Greg take Christmas to the hospital. While helping Oliver figure out a way to woo Gina, a girl in his ballet group, Taylor wonders if she made a mistake breaking up with Eyo.
34	11	"Blondetourage"	Melissa Kosar	Donald Diego	January 3, 2018	211	4.74
Taylor wants to ditch Ellen (Bebe Wood), the first friend she ever made in Westport, to go out with a cooler group that Katie calls "The Blondetourage". Wanting to make some money for high-priced sneakers that Cooper Bradford owns, Oliver comes up with a scheme with Cooper that helps Taylor and her new friends throw off the tracking devices in their phones – for a fee, of course. Meanwhile, Anna-Kat no longer wants her mom to walk her to the school building, so Katie plays on her daughter's fear of natural disasters to win her back.
35	12	"Selling Out"	Helen Hunt	Brian Donovan & Ed Herro	January 10, 2018	212	4.52
With his John Stuart Mill book coming out, Greg is worried about his future and the family's finances if the book flops and he doesn't get tenure. Katie badly wants Greg to spring for car repairs, so she has Doris and Angela write glowing reviews of the book to boost Greg's confidence. At the same time, Oliver has to write his school paper about someone important to him, and he chooses Spencer. To the surprise of all, Greg's book sells out, which causes him to get a big head and buy a brand new car. However, Katie later discovers that Spencer bought all 10,000 copies of Greg's book so that Oliver would see his dad as someone important.
36	13	"The Anniversary"	David Bertman	Bill Callahan	January 17, 2018	213	5.00
Katie doesn't want one of Greg's over-the-top romantic gestures for their 18th anniversary, but such a gesture is just what Oliver needs when he screws up his first date with Gina by taking advice from Spencer. Frustrated with not getting anything on the school's candy-gram day, Anna-Kat scares the other students into giving their candy-grams to her. Meanwhile, Greg and Katie are convinced that Taylor is dating new fling Trip just to get under their skin, and plot to break up the two.
37	14	"Midlife Crisis"	Rebecca Asher	Sarah Dunn	January 24, 2018	214	5.32
While arguing with Chloe Brown Mueller, who wants to put her campaign signs on Katie's lawn, Katie learns that Chloe's successful husband Stan had a midlife crisis and is somewhere in Tibet. With Oliver showing signs of heading toward the same kind of life as Stan, Katie decides to get her son's midlife crisis over now, involving him in a revenge prank against Chloe. Meanwhile, Greg has lost his only male friend with Stan gone, so Anna-Kat tries to set him up with some dads at the playground.
38	15	"The Mom Switch"	Melissa Kosar	Anthony Lombardo	January 24, 2018	215	4.16
With all three kids demanding her time and attention, Katie decides to take a day for herself and hang out at her favorite big box store. She leaves the kids in the care of Viv, who says she is thinking about having a child and wants to know if she'd make a good mother. This serves its purpose, with the kids realizing how much they lean on Katie. As events unfold, Viv confirms her suspicions that she is pregnant.
39	16	"Field Day"	Chris Koch	Taylor Hamra	February 28, 2018	217	4.09
It's the school's annual field day, and Katie's team makes her the "anchor" for the tug-of-war. When Chloe Brown Mueller suggests that's the only thing a woman Katie's size is good for, Katie vows to get her revenge by winning the mother-daughter three-legged race with Anna-Kat. Meanwhile, Oliver has decided he no longer wants to help his father with the chili cook-off contest, so Greg gets help from Taylor's boyfriend Trip instead. This angers Taylor when Trip shuns her to spend all his time preparing the chili with Greg.
40	17	"All Coupled Up"	John Putch	Donald Diego	March 7, 2018	216	4.20
To continue dating Gina, Oliver decides he can't reveal his materialism, causing him to blow off his rich friend Cooper when he wants to hang out with them. Though initially hurt, Cooper later asks Katie to help him become less of a spoiled brat. Greg is becoming annoyed with the constant PDA between Taylor and Trip, especially because they only engage in it when Katie leaves the room. Meanwhile, Anna-Kat realizes she is the only Otto not in a relationship, so she starts treating her oblivious playmate Franklin like a boyfriend.
41	18	"The Venue"	Lea Thompson	Stephanie Birkitt	March 14, 2018	218	3.71
Still without a venue for the Spring Gala, Katie hears from Greg that the perfect place is available, only to learn that she has to go through Chloe Brown Mueller to book it. An attempt to have Anna-Kat butter up Chloe fails, causing Katie to try and get the forceful Angela to help. Angela succeeds in having sex with a lonely Chloe, but then can't get rid of her. Katie eventually consoles a tearful Chloe, who claims she has no husband and no friends, and does lock up the venue. Meanwhile, Greg substitutes for Crossing Guard Sandy, and turns out to be very good at it. But the Otto kids are embarrassed to see their dad in this capacity, and plot to get him fired.
42	19	"It's Hard to Say Goodbye"	John Putch	Rick Wiener & Kenny Schwartz	March 21, 2018	219	4.45
Oliver excitedly tells the family that Spencer no longer has to wear an ankle monitor, and is taking him golfing the next day. Following golf, Spencer says he's taking Oliver yacht shopping in the morning. At home, Taylor says she wants to ditch family game night to hang with the Blondetourage, but comes home earlier than expected. Katie coaxes an upset Taylor until she admits the Blondetourage kicked her out. Meanwhile, Greg and Katie tell Anna-Kat they can no longer care for Hans Gruber, and make arrangements to take the pig to a farm animal sanctuary. At the end of the episode, Katie goes to confront Spencer about how he may be corrupting Oliver, only to find Spencer dead in his lawn chair.
43	20	"The Inheritance"	Helen Hunt	Lindsey Stoddart & Anthony Lombardo	April 4, 2018	220	4.72
In the wake of Spencer's death, the family prepares in different ways for the news that they might be inheriting money. As Oliver is at Spencer's house arranging things, Grandma Kathryn (Katie's mom) shows up at the door in a trench coat and lingerie. The family learns she's been visiting Spencer for sex ever since they met at Thanksgiving. As Katie and Greg are coming around to the idea that they may soon be rich, Greg intentionally blows his interview with the tenure board, thinking it no longer matters. Kathryn is being exceptionally nice and helpful, in hopes of gaining favor with her daughter. Oliver tries to figure out the best place for Spencer's ashes. The day comes for Spencer's lawyer to share his video will. In it, Spencer first says he's leaving everything to the Ottos. But moments later in the tape, he says he's changed his mind because he knows that Oliver will be successful and doesn't want to rob him of the sense of accomplishment. Everyone is let down except Greg, who learns that the tenure board actually liked his cavalier attitude, saying it's just what the school needs.
44	21	"It's Not You, It's Me"	Chris Koch	Brian Donovan & Ed Herro	April 11, 2018	221	3.99
Both Katie and Greg get a little too heavily involved in their kids' lives. Katie pushes Anna-Kat to expand her friend circle beyond Franklin, but that backfires. Katie also insists that Taylor get a job if she wants to use the car more, which comes back to bite her when Taylor becomes a waitress at the diner where Katie hangs out with Doris and Angela. Meanwhile, Oliver has to write a persuasive paper for school. Greg thinks recycling would be a great topic, but Oliver turns it around by writing a paper on how recycling is futile because it actually uses more resources than it saves. When Oliver gets an 'A' on the paper, an angry Greg confronts his teacher (Mary Pat Gleason).
45	22	"Sliding Sweaters"	Helen Hunt	Donald Diego	May 2, 2018	223	3.70
As Katie prepares to meet Ashley Clark (Mary Holland), a woman she once mentored who then took her job after Katie had children, she can't decide which sweater to buy for the occasion. Her day is shown going two different ways, depending on whether she wears a blue sweater or a pink sweater. Meanwhile, Greg finds that tenure isn't all he hoped it would be, as he deals with a tiny, makeshift office and his annoying new assistant, Grant (Ravi Patel).
46	23	"Finding Fillion"	David Bertman	Bill Callahan & Rick Wiener & Kenny Schwartz	May 9, 2018	222	4.12
Katie is giving an update to the Spring Gala board, proud of all she's accomplished and hoping to rub it in Tara Summers' face. Her attitude changes when a board member reminds Katie she promised to have Nathan Fillion riding in on an elephant. As fate would have it, Angela learns that Fillion will be at a sci-fi convention in New York City the same day Taylor wants to go there to get a prom dress at half price. Meanwhile, Greg starts to bond with Trip and thinks he may be a good guy for Taylor after all, until he finds a printout for a prom night hotel reservation in Trip's backpack. An angry Greg calls Katie just as she's located Fillion at the convention. Katie confronts Taylor, who says she made the reservation, not Trip.
47	24	"The Spring Gala"	John Putch	Sarah Dunn	May 16, 2018	224	4.15
Just when it seems the Spring Gala will go off without a hitch, Katie learns that someone cancelled the food, beverages, dancers, decorations and tents, while PETA won't allow an elephant to be ridden by Nathan Fillion. With the gala only eight hours away, Katie enlists the help of her family, Angela, Doris, Maria, Greg's assistant Grant, Oliver's dance troupe, and the farm where they sent Hans Gruber to still pull off a spectacular event. The gala becomes so successful it even draws praise from Chloe Brown Mueller. As an added bonus, Katie gets last year's shunned gala chairperson Stacy Clouser (Kathleen Rose Perkins) to show up and attack Tara Summers, whom they believe has sabotaged their galas when in reality it is Suzanne.

=== Season 3 (2018–19) ===
No. overall	No. in season	Title	Directed by	Written by	Original release date	Prod. code	U.S. viewers (millions)
48	1	"Mom Guilt"	Ken Whittingham	Donald Diego	September 26, 2018	301	4.43
Following the success of the spring gala, Katie goes back to work as a party planner, only to learn that her first client is Nancy Granville. Katie reluctantly leaves Greg to deal with Anna-Kat's increasing OCD behavior, blaming it on her absence from the home. She also promises to pay for Oliver to go see his new favorite motivational speaker if he will help "parent" his sister Taylor.
49	2	"Here We Go Again"	Helen Hunt	Rick Wiener & Kenny Schwartz	October 3, 2018	302	4.48
Katie is invited to meet her company's CEO in New York City, but is reluctant to go because of problems at home. Anna-Kat will no longer use the restroom at school, Oliver lies about the family's summer vacation in a school presentation, and Taylor is becoming the typical football girlfriend with Trip, making Katie fear she is losing her own identity.
50	3	"Cheaters Sometimes Win"	Michael McDonald	Brian Donovan & Ed Herro	October 10, 2018	303	4.27
Katie's mother Kathryn arrives and immediately causes a stir when she tells Taylor it's okay to not attend college, and instead become a flight attendant like herself. Oliver gets suspended for turning in a store-bought bird feeder for wood shop class, which he fears will now ruin his chances of getting into Harvard. Katie worries that both Oliver and Anna-Kat may have learned from her that it's okay to cheat sometimes.
51	4	"Enemies: An Otto Story"	Melissa Kosar	Jonathan Fener	October 17, 2018	304	4.17
The rivalry between Katie and Chloe Brown Mueller comes to a head when Anna-Kat and Chloe's daughter are running for the same student council position. Oliver wants to continue his ballet at an exclusive prep school, but Katie and Greg are strongly against it. Meanwhile, Greg suspects that Taylor's new musical theater partner, Pierce, is trying to come between her and Trip.
52	5	"Trust Me"	Paul Murphy	Taylor Hamra	October 24, 2018	306	4.23
After Taylor lies about adult supervision at a Halloween party she wants to attend, Katie wants to make her stay home but Greg says they should trust her and see where it goes. Oliver and Cooper attend a party with Gina and Gina's cousin, and both are a little apprehensive when the girls promise a make-out session in a closet. This happens to be a party Katie has planned, and the boys are let off the hook when pregnant Viv arrives and Katie is forced to deliver her baby in front of several horrified teens. At home, Anna-Kat thinks she is too grown up for Halloween, but later regrets her decision while handing out candy.
53	6	"Body Image"	Ken Whittingham	Rick Wiener & Kenny Schwartz & Sarah Dunn	October 31, 2018	305	4.14
Now that the formerly fattest housewife in Westport has had gastric bypass surgery, Chloe Brown Mueller can't wait to flaunt the woman in front of Katie. Convinced that Chloe has had work done, Katie enlists Doris and Angela to help her dig up an unflattering photo of Chloe from a high school yearbook. At the same time, Katie worries about her children becoming too body conscious. Taylor tries to do something about the thin lips she inherited from Grandma Kathryn, Oliver becomes obsessed with developing well-defined calves like the new guy in his ballet class, and Anna-Kat is curious about her teacher's new boob job.
54	7	"The Code"	Chris Koch	Anthony Lombardo	November 7, 2018	307	4.46
When Katie presses Greg on why they have used the code 4673 for just about everything since they met, he reluctantly tells her that on a keypad it spells "Hope" -- the name of his college girlfriend that he dated for two years. Meanwhile, Gina gets selected for the private ballet school scholarship and Oliver does not. Despite the pact they made that they would only go together, Gina says the opportunity is too good to pass up and she is going. At the same time, Taylor breaks up with Trip when he gets jealous over all the time she is spending with her theater partner, Pierce. Also, Grandma Kathryn tries to bond with Anna-Kat.
55	8	"Trophy Wife"	John Putch	Lindsey Stoddart	November 28, 2018	308	4.39
When Katie learns that a hot young trophy wife (Victoria Justice) has a stepdaughter in Anna-Kat's class, she convinces the woman to become a room parent for the sole purpose of annoying and worrying the older judgmental moms in town. This backfires when it causes Anna-Kat's choice for Friday movie to get nixed by the new room parent. Meanwhile, Greg enlists the help of Oliver and Taylor to get Grandma Kathryn to talk about something other than herself, but it proves to be difficult.
56	9	"Highs and Lows"	Ken Whittingham	Lauren Caltagirone	December 5, 2018	310	3.95
Concerned over how routine and predictable their lives have become, Katie decides to pick a fight with Greg for the purpose of resolving it with makeup sex. Taylor asks Kathryn for advice on how to choose from the many suitors she has since breaking up with Trip. Meanwhile, Anna-Kat worries about whom to sit with at lunch while Franklin is out with the chicken pox.
57	10	"Saving Christmas"	Jennifer Arnold	Jeremy Hall	December 12, 2018	311	4.57
Katie's father Marty (Patrick Duffy) arrives unexpectedly for the holidays, not knowing that his ex-wife Kathryn is living there. Despite Katie's attempts to keep the two apart, they end up in bed together. Meanwhile, Anna-Kat tries to help Trip win back Taylor, and Oliver has a humbling experience during his ballet troupe's holiday performance.
58	11	"The Things You Do"	Rebecca Asher	Taylor Hamra	February 5, 2019	314	4.54
Katie and Greg get into a war of words when they start venting the irritating things the other does in their marriage. Meanwhile, Anna-Kat and Oliver try to identify a mysterious sound they hear on the radio and aim to be the twentieth caller with the hope of winning $500. Elsewhere, when Pierce's true intentions come to light, the whole family rallies together to help Taylor woo Trip back.
59	12	"Disconnected"	Melissa Kosar	Jonathan Fener	February 12, 2019	312	4.23
While Katy goes boot shopping with Taylor to try and reconnect with her, Greg agrees to take Oliver to see motivational speaker Johnny Diamond in hopes of bonding better with his son. This leaves Anna-Kat feeling like her status as the favorite child is in jeopardy.
60	13	"Mo' Money, Mo' Problems"	Anya Adams	Donald Diego	February 19, 2019	309	4.33
Greg and Katie decide to get frivolous with Katie's bonus check and go to a fancy Westport hotel, which leaves Taylor in charge of the house. Trying to prove he can be a "bad boy", Oliver takes his parents' other car without permission to drive Cooper and himself to a party.
61	14	"Baby Crazy"	David Bertman	Brian Donovan & Ed Herro	February 26, 2019	313	4.41
Overwhelmed as a single parent, Viv drops off her baby with the Ottos which has Greg thinking he would like another child. When Viv's ex-husband returns, insisting he's a changed man, Katy has to convince the exhausted Viv that she is still better off without him. Meanwhile, Taylor schemes to get Oliver's help in retrieving an expensive earring that the dog ate.
62	15	"American Idol"	John Putch	Jordan Roter	March 19, 2019	315	3.84
When Taylor expresses her desire not to go to college and to become a professional singer instead, Katy and her daughter have a big fight and Taylor runs away from home to pursue her career, Katie determines to get her back home and give her the biggest grounding ever. At home, Oliver and Anna-Kat help Greg create a viral message to promote membership in his historical society. Meanwhile, Katy is hired to plan a party for a Westport businesswomen's association, only to learn it is all her frienemies pretending to be important.
63	16	"Insta-Friends"	Chris Koch	Lindsey Stoddart & Anthony Lombardo	March 26, 2019	316	3.82
Katie is initially pleased when Greg becomes friends with Dane (Tim Baltz), a member of his Historical Society, as it gives her some much desired alone time at home. But she actually starts to miss her husband when he makes plans with Dane night after night. Meanwhile, Oliver feels like Cooper is intentionally ditching him after lying about having no plans then posting a photo of himself on a yacht. It turns out that Cooper was ditched by his own family and posted a photo from last summer.
64	17	"Liar Liar, Room on Fire"	Betsy Thomas	Donald Diego	April 9, 2019	317	3.60
Not wanting to admit she forgot Greg's birthday, Katie promises him the adult dinner party he's always wanted. With only the current day to plan, she is able to round up Doris and her husband, Angela and her current girlfriend, and no one else. At the party, Katie is forced to admit she's lied to both her friends and Greg on various occasions. Meanwhile, the Otto children have a series of mishaps in Taylor's bedroom, but try to fix the problems themselves because Katie forbade them from interrupting the adult party.
65	18	"Phone Free Day"	Nirvana Adams	Taylor Hamra	April 16, 2019	321	3.87
With Anna-Kat obsessing over using Taylor's phone and Taylor constantly complaining about it, Katie proposes to give up her own phone for a day and give Taylor a new phone if she can do the same. But the plan backfires on Katie multiple times. Meanwhile, Oliver overhears two businessmen discussing something that would greatly affect their company stock. Wanting to take advantage of the situation but not able to purchase stock at his age, Oliver seeks advice from a pile of VHS tapes that Spencer left for him.
66	19	"Grandma's Way"	Paul Murphy	Lauren Caltagirone & Jeremy Hall	April 23, 2019	319	4.02
After complaining about Katie's parenting, Taylor is forced to be somewhat of a parent when Katie falls ill and takes some questionable medication that Grandma Kathryn provided. Meanwhile, Kathryn is left to manage Anna-Kat's playdate and try to keep Oliver from seeing Gina, who is back and wanting forgiveness after failing in the ballet academy. Anna-Kat's playdate goes off plan but is a success, and Oliver does see Gina but makes the correct decision to stay with his current girlfriend, Brie. Also, Greg tries to be supportive and accompany his assistant Grant to his first comedy performance, only to find that most of Grant's jokes are at his expense.
67	20	"Field Trippin'"	John Putch	Jonathan Fener	April 30, 2019	320	4.28
Upon realizing that work has kept her from spending quality time with Anna-Kat, Katie decides to chaperone Anna-Kat's class field trip, only to find that her daughter doesn't want her there. Meanwhile, Taylor and Oliver jointly fake being sick so they can play hooky with Trip and Cooper, respectively. But Greg has some fun spoiling their day upon figuring out the lie.
68	21	"Locked in the Basement"	Chris Koch	Brian Donovan & Ed Herro	May 7, 2019	323	3.96
Because of their own differences, Katie and Chloe Brown Mueller insist that their daughters only be "school friends" and not "home friends". But Anna-Kat has other ideas, locking the moms in the basement until they learn to get along. Meanwhile, Greg encourages Oliver to be honest and reveal his interest in ballet to Brie, but Greg then reveals to Oliver a secret interest he's hidden from Katie all these years.
69	22	"The Dance"	Melissa Kosar	Rick Wiener & Kenny Schwartz & Sarah Dunn	May 14, 2019	322	3.67
As the school dance approaches, Franklin asks Greg for permission to take his daughter. With all their children having dates for the dance, Greg and Katie look forward to a rare romantic night alone. But Franklin surprises everyone by asking Taylor to the dance instead of Anna-Kat, stating Anna-Kat is merely his best friend. Anna-Kat then asks Trip to the dance to make Franklin jealous, and Taylor encourages Trip to accept so they can at least be at the dance together. Meanwhile, Oliver and Brie see a psychic, who tells them a "romantic evening will end in disaster", making Oliver fearful to attend the dance. In the end, it is Katie and Greg's romantic evening that is ruined, as they rush to the dance to head off Brie's mother, who says her daughter is not allowed to date yet and went behind her back.
70	23	"A Mom's Parade"	Paul Murphy	Story by : Rick Weiner & Kenny Schwartz; Teleplay by : Kat Likkel & John Hoberg	May 21, 2019	318	3.64
In a musical episode, Katie is feeling underappreciated, and thus orders her children to give her the "Westport Mom" treatment. But while trying to help mom with the laundry, Taylor destroys an artifact from the Westport Historical Society that Greg had brought home.

=== Season 4 (2019–20) ===
No. overall	No. in season	Title	Directed by	Written by	Original release date	Prod. code	U.S. viewers (millions)
71	1	"The Minivan"	Paul Murphy	Jonathan Fener	September 27, 2019	401	3.34
With the kids growing older, Katie and Greg decide to sell the old minivan, hoping to usher in a new era in their lives. However, their excitement is short lived when Anna-Kat is released from her special education class, Taylor's lack of basic life skills causes an issue, and a torn ACL puts Oliver's dance career in jeopardy.
72	2	"Bed, Bath & Beyond Our Means"	Natalia Anderson	Lindsey Stoddart	October 4, 2019	405	3.29
When Katie's boss Whitney (Kelly Ripa) comes to town, Katie contemplates quitting her job. Meanwhile, Greg suffers a mid-life crisis after a fellow tenured professor passes away. Also, Anna-Kat and Franklin take it upon themselves to cheer up Taylor and Oliver, who are depressed over their futures.
73	3	"Bigger Kids, Bigger Problems"	Paul Murphy	Sherry Bilsing-Graham & Ellen Plummer	October 11, 2019	403	3.36
After discovering birth control in Taylor's room, Katie struggles with how to parent her now 18-year-old daughter. Complicating matters, Taylor goes to Angela for help instead of her mother. Meanwhile, Anna-Kat, Franklin, and Greg seek the help of Greg's friends (Ryan Stiles and Drew Carey) to battle the lunch lady (Kathy Kinney), who refuses to switch from disposable plastic plates to washable plates. Also, Oliver prepares to deliver scripted responses for a teen helpline with the purpose of gaining community service experience for his Harvard application, but inadvertently discovers real empathy. NOTE: This episode reunites the cast of The Drew Carey Show.
74	4	"Lasagna"	John Putch	Lauren Caltagirone	October 18, 2019	404	3.27
As Katie tries to decide on a new career path, Stan returns to town following a stroke and reconnects with Chloe. When Chloe won't let Stan eat any carbs, he secretly sneaks to the Otto house to eat Katie's lasagna, making Chloe think the two are having an affair. Meanwhile, Oliver is desperate to get hired by the teen helpline, so he pretends that Angela and Doris are his lesbian parents when he goes for his interview. Also, Taylor takes Anna-Kat to get her ears pierced without consulting Katie.
75	5	"The Maze"	Melissa Kosar	Anthony Lombardo	October 25, 2019	406	3.31
Trying to reconnect with Anna-Kat, Katie decides her daughter is old enough to go through the town's haunted maze with her. Oliver is in a bind, as he's afraid to go through the maze but even more afraid that Brie will see him as a chicken. Meanwhile, after dropping off Trip, Taylor is followed by a mysterious vehicle.
76	6	"Girls' Night Out"	Melissa Kosar	Michael Hobert	November 1, 2019	402	3.68
When Richard announces that he is leaving Doris, the ladies orchestrate a girls' night out to help Doris score a revenge hookup. With her 40th birthday approaching, Katie begins to feel uncomfortable with her appearance, prompting Greg to tell her to leave her wedding ring at home to prove she is still desirable. Meanwhile, Greg and the kids attempt to recreate a photo that they gave Katie for her 30th birthday.
77	7	"Flavor of Westport"	Alisa Statman	Jeremy Hall	November 15, 2019	407	3.34
Katie enlists Oliver's business savvy after realizing how little profit she is turning with her lasagna sales. Oliver convinces her to sell the lasagnas at the Flavor of Westport festival, only to learn that the festival is restricting entries to "healthy choices". Nevertheless, Oliver and Katie find a way to get around the rules. Meanwhile, Taylor has her first babysitting job when Franklin's parents go away for the weekend, but she, Trip and Anna-Kat lose Franklin during a game of hide-and-seek.
78	8	"Women in Business"	Nirvana Adams	Donald Diego	November 22, 2019	408	3.31
Following an incident on Career Day at the kids' school, Chloe Brown Mueller starts posting "anonymous" negative Yelp reviews about Katie's lasagna, which leads Katie to get back at her rival by hiring away Maria for her business. At the same time, Anna-Kat gives romantic advice to Principal Ablin, who wants to ask out Maria, in exchange for Ablin putting Franklin back in Anna-Kat's lunch hour. At home, Taylor wants to spend some quality time with Dad, but it's really a ruse to get Greg to provide answers she needs for her college application.
79	9	"Hip to Be Square"	David L. Bertman	Henning Fog & Nick Roth	November 29, 2019	410	2.86
After hearing how Doris and her estranged husband Richard grew apart, Katie worries that she and Greg have nothing in common anymore and resolves to do something about it. Similarly, Anna-Kat wants to indulge Franklin's passion for square dancing, even though she hates it. Elsewhere, Cooper tells Oliver he wants to say "I love you" to girlfriend Charlotte, which makes Oliver worry that Brie will expect the same thing because she and Charlotte are so close. Also, Trip keeps interrupting the musical audition Taylor is making for Carnegie Mellon, and she later realizes it's sabotage because Trip doesn't want her to move away.
80	10	"The Bromance Before Christmas"	Chris Koch	Jonathan Fener	December 13, 2019	409	3.30
As Katie plans to share a family holiday tradition with Taylor, her mother shows up as an unwanted surprise from Greg. Greg then learns Katie surprised him by inviting his English half-brother (Ed Weeks), also named Greg, to town for the holidays. Meanwhile, Oliver and Anna-Kat break a Christmas plate that was handed down from Katie's grandmother, but Oliver insists he can repair it.
81	11	"One Step Forward, Three Steps Back"	Paul Murphy	Sherry Bilsing-Graham & Ellen Plummer	January 17, 2020	411	3.40
When Anna-Kat begins exhibiting old signs of her OCD, Katie and Greg fear that their bickering is at the forefront of the issue. They try to fight less in front of her, but this becomes extremely difficult with annoying internet sensation Lonnie Spears always at the house while Greg is writing his biography. Meanwhile, Oliver receives an unexpected call while working at Teen Help Line, and Taylor and Trip simulate a long-distance relationship to see what it will be like when Taylor goes off to college.
82	12	"Wildflower Girls"	Chris Koch	Patrick Sheehan	January 24, 2020	412	3.37
After Anna-Kat joins the Wildflower Girls, a troop led by Westport moms and former nemeses, Katie decides to instill upon the girls a sense of integrity and work ethic. Meanwhile, Oliver and Cooper try and befriend a social outcast whom they believe called Teen Help Line, and Taylor interviews with a Carnegie Mellon recruiter (Ian Gomez).
83	13	"The Great Cookie Challenge"	Eric Dean Seaton	Michael Hobert	January 31, 2020	413	3.19
With a coveted trip to Hollywood, CA as top prize, Katie vows to help Anna-Kat sell the most cookies for her Wildflower Girls troop. Taylor and Trip agonize over a letter from Carnegie Mellon that Taylor received in the mail. Greg challenges Lonnie to do a selfless deed. Meanwhile, Oliver receives a return call from a troubled classmate while volunteering at Teen Help Line, but accidentally lets it slip that he knows who the guy is.
84	14	"A Very English Scandal"	Ken Whittingham	Anthony Lombardo	March 18, 2020	414	3.16
Hoping to help Viv find her own Greg Otto, Katie sets her neighbor up with Greg's half-brother, Greg. However, when the two begin spending a lot of time together, Katie and Greg conspire to break them up. Meanwhile, the school population wrongfully thinks Oliver is gay, and rather than fight it, he takes advantage of the situation. Elsewhere, wanting to catch-up to her maturing peers, Anna-Kat throws away her plastic horses under Taylor's direction.
85	15	"In My Room"	Randall Winston	Jeremy Hall	March 25, 2020	417	2.84
After Anna-Kat finds an old chair in the basement, Katie is reminded of the first apartment she and Greg had and decides to recreate the living quarters in her youngest daughter's bedroom. Meanwhile, Taylor explains the importance of covering for one's siblings to Anna-Kat, a depressed Doris agrees to take Oliver driving, and Greg continues to endure Lonnie's impractical jokes. Ultimately, Greg is pleased to discover that appearing in Lonnie's videos has greatly impacted the size of his college class and made him popular among his students.
86	16	"The Battle for Second Breakfast"	Alisa Statman	Lauren Caltagirone	April 1, 2020	416	3.12
When Angela and Doris begin dating a pair of siblings and skip second breakfast one day, Katie feels left out and invites Maria and Principal Ablin to their hangout. Meanwhile, Greg is eager to help Anna-Kat with her school project, but she is not enthused and decides to complete it on her own. Also, Oliver and Taylor do not like how they look when the Google Maps vehicle comes by the house as they work in the yard, so they pull out all the stops to get the photo retaken.
87	17	"All is Fair in Love and War Reenactment"	Melissa Kosar	Michael Hobart & Anthony Lombardo	April 15, 2020	418	3.12
After Taylor wears one of Anna-Kat's shirts to school, Anna-Kat goads Katie to punish Taylor. Katie tells Anna-Kat that she needs to learn how to stick-up for herself, which works with Taylor, but also leads to Anna-Kat rebelling against authority figures at school, prompting a meeting between Principal Ablin and Katie. At second breakfast, Doris encourages Katie to discipline Anna-Kat by embarrassing her at school. Meanwhile, knowing that Oliver always makes fun of his interests, Greg invites Lonnie, Trip and Franklin to join in his local American Revolution reenactment. Jealous and upset, Oliver retaliates by joining the opposing British forces. Franklin and Trip are cast as brothers in the reenactment, causing Franklin to treat Trip like a real brother and irritate him with persistent questions. Unbeknownst to Trip, Franklin has chosen him as his "hero" for a school assignment.
88	18	"Senior Prank"	Chris Koch	Donald Diego	April 22, 2020	415	3.00
Feeling that Taylor deserves to break the rules a little after working so hard to graduate, Katie goads her and Trip to cover the school minuteman statue with silly string and shaving cream. However, the group accidentally breaks the musket off the statue, and worse, Principal Ablin enlists Greg to help him find the culprits. Meanwhile, Anna-Kat is invited to her first "cool kid" party and wants to bring Franklin. She asks Oliver and Cooper to prepare Franklin with new clothes and a cool story to tell, which backfires, but Franklin is able to impress the group by just being himself.
89	19	"Vacation!"	Chris Koch	Jonathan Fener	May 6, 2020	419	2.80
The Ottos take the trip to California that Anna-Kat won with Wildflower Girls, which coincides with Katie's 40th birthday. Taking advice from Doris and Angela, Katie plans to spend time doing just what she wants, leaving the kids on their own. While Greg and Katie take a pot-laden Uber trip to nowhere, Taylor loses all her money to a shell game scam artist on Hollywood Boulevard, though Anna-Kat manages to earn it back. Meanwhile, Cooper has flown in on his private jet to confront Oliver about a fight they had before Oliver left. Oliver makes plans to show Cooper what it's like to vacation on a lower income, but realizes Cooper envies something that Oliver has. As the group all reunites for dinner, Katie meets her favorite reality star Lisa Vanderpump, who turns out to be Cooper's godmother. Back at the hotel, Katie opens the photo Greg and the kids made (Ep. 4.6), then enjoys an even bigger surprise: Doris and Angela have arrived to party with her.
90	20	"Prom"	Melissa Kosar	Donald Diego	May 13, 2020	420	3.05
As she prepares for prom with Trip, Taylor remembers she has one item left on her life skills list: teaching Greg to shoot a 3-point basket in order to learn how to stick with a difficult task. This proves trying, as Greg has to confront an embarrassing incident on the basketball court from his past. Meanwhile, Oliver and Cooper decide to have a "Crom" on Cooper's yacht in lieu of prom. However, Oliver gets a call on teen helpline from a girl who's despondent that she's not going to prom because of her looks. They make a connection, and Oliver agrees to go to prom with her, giving her his address. When the girl, named Lindsey, shows up and is gorgeous, she explains that boys are apparently too intimidated by her looks to ask her, and she thanks Oliver for being her date. Also, Katie deals with Anna-Kat possibly being bullied at school, only to learn that Anna-Kat is the bully.

=== Season 5 (2020–21) ===
No. overall	No. in season	Title	Directed by	Written by	Original release date	Prod. code	U.S. viewers (millions)
91	1	"Graduation"	Melissa Kosar	Rick Wiener & Kenny Schwartz & Sarah Dunn	October 28, 2020	421	3.45
Katie finds out that Taylor cannot graduate because Katie forgot to return a library book for Taylor four years ago, and to void the fee, she must plan Principal Ablin and Maria’s wedding on a very limited budget. Greg finishes ghostwriting Lonnie’s book, but is baffled when Lonnie tries to delay the ending. Meanwhile, Trip and Taylor get into a fight about failing a couples’ compatibility quiz, Anna-Kat and Franklin argue about Anna-Kat’s decision to go to sleep away camp, while Oliver is saddened to learn that Cooper’s family is moving out of Westport. Katie decides to use the graduation ceremony itself as the wedding venue, and Trip makes up with Taylor during his speech as the minister. Anna-Kat finds out the reason Franklin was so against her going to camp is because he didn’t want her to have her first kiss with someone else, and they reconcile. Greg and Lonnie decide to go on a book tour, and he and Katie work out an agreement with Cooper’s family to let him stay with them until he finishes high school. Note 1: This episode was originally written as the preceding season’s finale, but aired as the season premiere because of production shutdown due to the impact of COVID-19. Note 2: This is the last appearance of Angela (Carly Hughes), due to Hughes deciding to leave the series.
92	2	"Psych"	Chris Koch	Rick Wiener & Kenny Schwartz & Sarah Dunn	November 4, 2020	501	3.14
Having quit her lasagna business, Katie finds she has nothing to do except meddle in everyone's affairs. This includes Greg, who gets upset when Katie ruins his pitch to the city council to cancel a development project on a piece of historic land. Katie later encourages Greg to run for city council himself. Having started college, Taylor starts to put herself on a pedestal, irritating Trip and others. Anna-Kat is upset when Franklin doesn't have her back like a boyfriend should, leading to Franklin picking a fight with an eighth grader to defend Anna-Kat's honor. Elsewhere, Oliver is excited to have an internship opportunity with one of Cooper's contacts, mainly to pad his Harvard application. However, after learning everything he's done so far is the same as hundreds of Harvard applicants, Oliver decides to get involved with a fellow student's business idea.
93	3	"Coupling"	Alisa Statman	Rick Wiener & Kenny Schwartz	November 18, 2020	502	2.90
Katie is angry upon learning that Trip slept overnight in Taylor's room, and further learns they did more than sleep. Taylor says that's what college girls do: have their boyfriend in their room. Doris tells Katie that she and Greg must suck it up and let the kids do what they will do, or in the future, Taylor won't bring her kids over for Thanksgiving. Katie and Greg later become so weird about making sure Taylor and Trip enjoy their coupling time, the kids no longer want to do it in the house. Meanwhile, Anna-Kat and Franklin contract mono, making the parents think they are now kissing. In reality, they caught it from sharing a metal straw that the environmentally-conscious Greg made them use. Also, Oliver and Cooper start behaving like a married couple, with Cooper complaining Oliver is always out working on their fellow student's business project.
94	4	"Homeschool Sweet Homeschool"	Chris Koch	Jonathan Fener	November 25, 2020	503	3.13
With Anna-Kat and Franklin stuck home with mono, Katie is forced to homeschool them and uses the opportunity to launch her mommy vlog. But after trying to be someone she's not on the vlog, Katie lets loose on the kids and neglects to delete the recording. The result is something mom audiences eat up and praise. Meanwhile, Taylor gets an 'A' on her first college paper which makes Greg question her young TA's intentions, but the TA later says Taylor's story has one of the most original takes he's seen. Also, Oliver and Cooper decide to move to the basement, leading to Cooper hiring contractors to remodel it. While Katie likes the new look, she questions whether Cooper will get anywhere in life constantly relying on his parents' money.
95	5	"Kids These Days"	Randall Winston	Anthony Lombardo	December 2, 2020	504	3.15
Katie tries to get Anna-Kat and Franklin to be more active for her mommy vlog, but the kids are obsessed with being ultra-safe and are afraid to just play. Oliver asks his parents for a prescription for an ADHD drug, saying he needs it to be extra alert for his midterms that will be crucial for his Harvard dreams. Both parents refuse, but Oliver is able to obtain a couple pills from his classmate. Greg takes a pill that Oliver hid in a B-12 bottle, causing side effects to kick in during his city council debate. Elsewhere, Taylor is invited to an art exhibit by her TA, Andre, who clumsily insists it's not a date after Taylor asks to bring her boyfriend. Taylor is disappointed when Trip doesn't seem to "get" art the way she does, but he later makes a gesture that reminds her of all his good qualities that she fell in love with.
96	6	"Mother's Little Helper"	Eric Dean Seaton	Stephanie Birkitt	January 13, 2021	506	3.13
While Anna-Kat is boycotting Katie's mommy vlog because mom brings up too many embarrassing stories, Katie is excited that her old pal Tami (Holly Robinson Peete) is moving to Westport, and she uses her friend as a guest on the vlog. Katie holds Tami in high esteem as a mother, and Tami does help her handle an issue with Oliver and Cooper when Katie discovers their hidden bar in the basement. But it appears Tami no longer has the stamina to handle her youngest child, Grace, and actually needs Katie's help. Meanwhile, Taylor discovers Greg playing bass guitar in a history-themed band at the mall, something no one else in the family knows about.
97	7	"Under Pressure"	Chris Koch	Michael Hobert	January 27, 2021	505	2.79
After repeatedly declining Maria's request for a couples dinner, Katie eventually caves when Greg says that Maria's husband, Principal Ablin, can greatly help his city council campaign by endorsing him on the school's message board. However, the dinner only inspires Ablin to run for city council himself. Anna-Kat unwittingly becomes the "queen bee" of her friend group, which greatly pleases Katie but causes Anna-Kat stress when her friends begin to copy her every move. Meanwhile, Oliver's stress over his SAT test has him reluctantly trying the relaxation techniques that Taylor is learning in her psychology class, but nothing seems to work. Oliver then gets a call on teen helpline from a girl who is worried about a big tennis match, and he gives her sound advice. Taylor then presents Oliver with his own advice, admitting she called teen helpline using an app to disguise her voice.
98	8	"Encourage, Discourage"	Randall Winston	Sherry Bilsing-Graham & Ellen Kreamer	February 3, 2021	507	2.71
J.D., a recently divorced gay man, overhears Katie and Tami talking at second breakfast and praises them for being the only people in the place having a "real" conversation. Later, Katie and Tami discuss needing some masculinity in their group (which Greg overhears and misunderstands), and they decide to invite J.D. to their next second breakfast. J.D. mentions wanting to be a father, causing Katie and Tami to try all they can to convince him of the pitfalls of parenthood. While the women meant well, J.D. is disappointed that they think he can't handle a child. Meanwhile, Cooper continues to deal with becoming "Otto poor" while also admitting he's never learned to ride a bicycle. Also, Taylor starts to realize she may be drifting apart from Trip as she gets closer to Andre, her Philosophy TA.
99	9	"The Heist"	Chris Koch	Donald Diego	February 10, 2021	508	2.64
J.D. is torn between two egg donors and wants to meet them in person, but the fertility clinic says that information is confidential. J.D. then conspires with Katie and Tami to break into the clinic at night and steal the women's addresses. Meanwhile, Taylor gets in trouble with her ne'er-do-well friends, the Joshes, and is arrested. Greg tries to make a deal with the local newspaper publisher's son to keep Taylor out of the police blotter, worried that it might harm his election campaign. He is successful, only to have Katie get arrested at the fertility clinic and end up in the blotter. Also, Cooper becomes depressed over the thought that, without money, he has nothing to contribute to Oliver's business or family. That changes after he makes a gourmet lunch for Oliver, Anna-Kat and Franklin.
100	10	"Getting Frank with the Ottos"	Melissa Kosar	Story by : Sarah Dunn; Teleplay by : Rick Wiener & Kenny Schwartz	February 24, 2021	509	3.15
For his 100th "Getting Frank with Franklin" podcast (a nod to the 100th episode of American Housewife), Franklin decides to interview the entire Otto household. His interview questions dig deep, as he explores Greg's tendency to be a pushover, Cooper and Oliver's "lapdog-and-owner" relationship, Taylor hiding her affection for Andre from Trip, and Katie's tendency to discourage Anna-Kat from trying things that might lead to failure. This causes Greg to hire Lonnie Spears to help him fight back against Ablin's misleading campaign ads, while Cooper becomes brutally honest about following Oliver to Harvard and Katie confronts her mother about treating her like she's treating Anna-Kat. Meanwhile, Taylor accepts a lunch date with Andre and sees Trip walk in with another girl.
101	11	"The Guardian"	Randall Winston	Jeremy Hall	March 3, 2021	510	2.73
With Oliver and Taylor beginning to take care of themselves, Greg tries to determine who would be Anna-Kat's guardian should something happen to both him and Katie. Katie's mother Kathryn is the only nearby relative, but Greg has major reservations about her caretaking abilities. However, after Oliver and Taylor work through a quarrel and start getting along, Greg and Katie start to see them as possible guardians. Oliver runs into Lindsey while out with Taylor, and gets visibly upset when Lindsey shuns him. Meanwhile, J.D. tries to meet with his potential egg donors without them finding out why. After dismissing one woman, he makes a connection with the second, but soon fears the woman may be under the impression that they are dating.
102	12	"How Oliver Got His Groove Back"	Melissa Kosar	Feraz Ozel	March 24, 2021	511	2.72
With Oliver reluctant to get over Lindsey's disinterest and move on, Katie and her pals decide to impersonate him on Instagram to woo his classmate, Audra. Greg finds a way to entrap a political opponent who has been overheard saying negative things about Westport. With Lonnie's help, Greg manages to do so, but then decides not to use it. The opponent soon drops out of the race anyway. Meanwhile, Taylor and Andre go on a real date, but Taylor avoids his kiss at the end of it and can't figure out why. She runs into Trip and explains that while she enjoyed the attention paid by her college TA, she's really in love with Trip and wants to try again. After saying he needs time to think about it, Trip agrees within a few seconds. Also, Anna-Kat makes Franklin his favorite cake for their third anniversary of sharing gum. She is put off by his gift of an apparently unrelated poem, until Franklin explains its meaning.
103	13	"The Election"	Chris Koch	Nick Roth & Henning Fog	March 31, 2021	512	2.72
In the series finale, Cooper's father Doyle (Joel McHale) arrives for a visit, and Katie learns that Cooper hasn't told him about going to culinary school. Cooper says he just planned to attend culinary school while his father thinks he's at Harvard and urges Katie to butt out, but she can't help herself. Oliver has major test anxiety and blows his SAT, but good news from his business partner Trevor has him rethinking his college plans, anyway. After Anna-Kat realizes that she and Franklin have been spending most of their time together has been watching the movie Soapdish, Franklin has realized that he has become lazy in his relationship with Anna-Kat, Franklin gives her a whistle ring and proposes to marry her in 15 years. This inspires Trip to propose to Taylor for real, and she accepts. The City Council election ends with Greg and Ablin in a tie. Because the city's last tie was in 1792 and the charter's provision for ties hasn't been amended since then, Greg and Ablin are forced to have a duel. The city official agrees that the duel can be done with paintball guns. After Ablin cheats, Greg shoots him and wins. As the series ends, Katie reveals she is pregnant.

== Ratings ==
=== Overview ===
American Housewife : U.S. viewers per episode (millions)

Season	Episode number																							
Season	1	2	3	4	5	6	7	8	9	10	11	12	13	14	15	16	17	18	19	20	21	22	23	24
1	6.61	5.75	5.20	5.10	5.28	6.14	5.59	5.06	5.32	5.62	5.93	5.47	5.40	5.33	5.21	5.19	4.90	4.39	4.31	4.49	4.43	4.29	4.39	–
2	5.66	4.96	5.02	5.11	4.75	4.53	4.89	4.51	4.52	4.79	4.74	4.52	5.00	5.32	4.16	4.09	4.20	3.71	4.45	4.72	3.99	3.70	4.12	4.15
3	4.43	4.48	4.27	4.17	4.23	4.14	4.46	4.39	3.95	4.57	4.54	4.23	4.33	4.41	3.84	3.82	3.60	3.87	4.02	4.28	3.96	3.67	3.64	–
4	3.34	3.29	3.36	3.27	3.31	3.68	3.34	3.31	2.86	3.30	3.40	3.37	3.19	3.16	2.84	3.12	3.12	3.00	2.80	3.05	–			
5	3.45	3.14	2.90	3.13	3.15	3.13	2.79	2.71	2.64	3.15	2.73	2.72	2.72	–										

Audience measurement performed by Nielsen Media Research

=== Season 1 ===
Viewership and ratings per episode of List of American Housewife episodes
No.	Title	Air date	Rating/share (18–49)	Viewers (millions)	DVR (18–49)	Total (18–49)
1	"Pilot"	October 11, 2016	1.9/7	6.61	0.9	2.8
2	"The Nap"	October 18, 2016	1.7/6	5.75	0.8	2.5
3	"Westport Zombies"	October 25, 2016	1.6/6	5.20	0.8	2.4
4	"Art Show"	November 1, 2016	1.5/5	5.10	0.7	2.2
5	"The Snub"	November 15, 2016	1.6/5	5.28	0.7	2.3
6	"The Blow-Up"	November 22, 2016	1.5/5	6.14	0.6	2.1
7	"Power Couple"	November 29, 2016	1.5/5	5.59	0.7	2.2
8	"Westport Cotillion"	December 6, 2016	1.4/5	5.06	0.6	2.0
9	"Krampus Katie"	December 13, 2016	1.5/5	5.32	0.8	2.3
10	"The Playdate"	January 3, 2017	1.6/5	5.62	0.7	2.3
11	"The Snowstorm"	January 10, 2017	1.5/5	5.93	0.7	2.2
12	"Surprise"	January 17, 2017	1.5/5	5.47	0.8	2.3
13	"Then and Now"	February 7, 2017	1.5/5	5.40	0.7	2.2
14	"Time for Love"	February 14, 2017	1.5/5	5.33	—N/a	—N/a
15	"The Man Date"	February 21, 2017	1.4/5	5.21	0.7	2.1
16	"Bag Lady"	March 7, 2017	1.4/5	5.19	0.7	2.1
17	"Other People's Marriages"	March 14, 2017	1.4/5	4.90	0.6	2.0
18	"The Otto Motto"	April 4, 2017	1.2/5	4.39	0.7	1.9
19	"The Polo Match"	April 11, 2017	1.1/4	4.31	0.6	1.7
20	"The Walk"	April 18, 2017	1.2/5	4.49	0.7	1.9
21	"The Club"	May 2, 2017	1.2/5	4.43	0.6	1.8
22	"Dude, Where's My Napkin?"	May 9, 2017	1.2/5	4.29	0.6	1.8
23	"Can't Hide it Anymore"	May 16, 2017	1.2/5	4.39	—N/a	—N/a

=== Season 2 ===
Viewership and ratings per episode of List of American Housewife episodes
No.	Title	Air date	Rating/share (18–49)	Viewers (millions)	DVR (18–49)	Total (18–49)
1	"Back to School"	September 27, 2017	1.6/6	5.66	0.9	2.5
2	"Boar-Dain"	October 4, 2017	1.4/5	4.96	0.8	2.2
3	"The Uprising"	October 11, 2017	1.4/5	5.02	0.8	2.2
4	"The Lice Storm"	October 18, 2017	1.4/5	5.11	0.8	2.2
5	"Boo-Who?"	October 25, 2017	1.3/5	4.75	0.8	2.1
6	"The Pig Whisperer"	November 1, 2017	1.2/4	4.53	0.7	1.9
7	"Family Secrets"	November 15, 2017	1.3/5	4.89	0.8	2.1
8	"Gala Auction"	November 29, 2017	1.0/4	4.51	0.8	1.8
9	"The Couple"	December 6, 2017	1.2/5	4.52	0.7	1.9
10	"Blue Christmas"	December 13, 2017	1.3/5	4.79	TBD	TBD
11	"Blondetourage"	January 3, 2018	1.3/5	4.74	0.6	1.9^{1}
12	"Selling Out"	January 10, 2018	1.2/5	4.52	0.7	1.9
13	"The Anniversary"	January 17, 2018	1.3/5	5.00	0.7	2.0
14	"Midlife Crisis"	January 24, 2018	1.4/5	5.32	—N/a	—N/a
15	"The Mom Switch"	January 24, 2018	1.1/4	4.16	0.7	1.8
16	"Field Day"	February 28, 2018	1.0/4	4.09	—N/a	—N/a
17	"All Coupled Up"	March 7, 2018	1.1/4	4.20	TBD	TBD
18	"The Venue"	March 14, 2018	1.0/4	3.71	TBD	TBD
19	"It's Hard to Say Goodbye"	March 21, 2018	1.3/5	4.45	0.6	1.9
20	"The Inheritance"	April 4, 2018	1.2/5	4.72	0.7	1.9
21	"It's Not You, It's Me"	April 11, 2018	1.1/4	3.99	0.7	1.7
22	"Sliding Sweaters"	May 2, 2018	0.9/4	3.70	0.7	1.6
23	"Finding Fillion"	May 9, 2018	1.1/4	4.12	0.6	1.7
24	"The Spring Gala"	May 16, 2018	1.1/4	4.15	0.6	1.7

^1 Live +7 ratings were not available, so Live +3 ratings have been used instead.

=== Season 3 ===
Viewership and ratings per episode of List of American Housewife episodes
No.	Title	Air date	Rating/share (18–49)	Viewers (millions)	DVR (18–49)	Total (18–49)
1	"Mom Guilt"	September 26, 2018	1.2/6	4.43	0.6	1.8
2	"Here We Go Again"	October 3, 2018	1.1/5	4.48	—N/a	—N/a
3	"Cheaters Sometimes Win"	October 10, 2018	1.0/4	4.27	0.5	1.5
4	"Enemies: An Otto Story"	October 17, 2018	1.0/4	4.17	0.5	1.5
5	"Trust Me"	October 24, 2018	1.1/5	4.23	0.5	1.6
6	"Body Image"	October 31, 2018	0.9/4	4.14	0.5	1.4
7	"The Code"	November 7, 2018	1.1/5	4.46	0.5	1.6
8	"Trophy Wife"	November 28, 2018	1.0/5	4.39	0.6	1.6
9	"Highs and Lows"	December 5, 2018	0.9/4	3.95	TBD	TBD
10	"Saving Christmas"	December 12, 2018	1.0/4	4.57	TBD	TBD
11	"The Things You Do"	February 5, 2019	0.8/4	4.54	TBD	TBD
12	"Disconnected"	February 12, 2019	0.9/4	4.23	TBD	TBD
13	"Mo' Money, Mo' Problems"	February 19, 2019	0.9/4	4.33	TBD	TBD
14	"Baby Crazy"	February 26, 2019	1.0/5	4.41	TBD	TBD
15	"American Idol"	March 19, 2019	0.8/4	3.84	TBD	TBD
16	"Insta-Friends"	March 26, 2019	0.8/4	3.82	TBD	TBD
17	"Liar Liar, Room on Fire"	April 9, 2019	0.7/3	3.60	TBD	TBD
18	"Phone Free Day"	April 16, 2019	0.8/4	3.87	0.4	1.2
19	"Grandma's Way"	April 23, 2019	0.8/4	4.02	0.4	1.2
20	"Field Trippin"	April 30, 2019	0.9/4	4.28	TBD	TBD
21	"Locked in the Basement"	May 7, 2019	0.8/4	3.96	TBD	TBD
22	"The Dance"	May 14, 2019	0.8/4	3.67	TBD	TBD
23	"A Mom's Parade"	May 21, 2019	0.7/4	3.64	TBD	TBD

=== Season 4 ===
Viewership and ratings per episode of List of American Housewife episodes
No.	Title	Air date	Rating/share (18–49)	Viewers (millions)	DVR (18–49)	Total (18–49)
1	"The Minivan"	September 27, 2019	0.7/5	3.34	0.5	1.2
2	"Bed, Bath & Beyond Our Means"	October 4, 2019	0.5/3	3.29	0.5	1.0
3	"Bigger Kids, Bigger Problems"	October 11, 2019	0.5/3	3.36	0.4	0.9
4	"Lasagna"	October 18, 2019	0.6/3	3.27	0.4	1.0
5	"The Maze"	October 25, 2019	0.6/4	3.31	0.4	1.0
6	"Girls' Night Out"	November 1, 2019	0.7/4	3.68	0.4	1.1
7	"Flavor of Westport"	November 15, 2019	0.6/4	3.34	0.5	1.1
8	"Women in Business"	November 22, 2019	0.6/4	3.31	0.4	1.0
9	"Hip to Be Square"	November 29, 2019	0.5/3	2.86	0.5	1.0
10	"The Bromance Before Christmas"	December 13, 2019	0.5/3	3.30	0.5	1.0
11	"One Step Forward, Three Steps Back"	January 17, 2020	0.5/3	3.40	TBD	TBD
12	"Wildflower Girls"	January 24, 2020	0.6/4	3.37	TBD	TBD
13	"The Great Cookie Challenge"	January 31, 2020	0.5	3.19	TBD	TBD
14	"A Very English Scandal"	March 18, 2020	0.6	3.16	0.5	1.1
15	"In My Room"	March 25, 2020	0.6	2.84	TBD	TBD
16	"The Battle for Second Breakfast"	April 1, 2020	0.7	3.12	TBD	TBD
17	"All is Fair in Love and War Reenactment"	April 15, 2020	0.6	3.12	TBD	TBD
18	"Senior Prank"	April 22, 2020	0.6	3.00	TBD	TBD
19	"Vacation"	May 6, 2020	0.5	2.80	TBD	TBD
20	"Prom"	May 13, 2020	0.6	3.05	TBD	TBD

=== Season 5 ===
Viewership and ratings per episode of List of American Housewife episodes
No.	Title	Air date	Rating (18–49)	Viewers (millions)	DVR (18–49)	Total (18–49)
1	"Graduation"	October 28, 2020	0.6	3.45	TBD	TBD
2	"Psych"	November 4, 2020	0.6	3.14	TBD	TBD
3	"Coupling"	November 18, 2020	0.6	2.90	TBD	TBD
4	"Homeschool Sweet Homeschool"	November 25, 2020	0.6	3.13	TBD	TBD
5	"Kids These Days"	December 2, 2020	0.6	3.15	TBD	TBD
6	"Mother's Little Helper"	January 13, 2021	0.6	3.13	TBD	TBD
7	"Under Pressure"	January 27, 2021	0.5	2.79	TBD	TBD
8	"Encourage, Discourage"	February 3, 2021	0.5	2.71	TBD	TBD
9	"The Heist"	February 10, 2021	0.5	2.64	TBD	TBD
10	"Getting Frank with the Ottos"	February 24, 2021	0.6	3.15	TBD	TBD
11	"The Guardian"	March 3, 2021	0.5	2.73	TBD	TBD
12	"How Oliver Got His Groove Back"	March 24, 2021	0.5	2.72	TBD	TBD
13	"The Election"	March 31, 2021	0.5	2.72	TBD	TBD
