= Curfew (1989 film) =

1989 film by Gary Winick

- Theatrical release poster
- Directed by: Gary Winick
- Written by: Kevin Kennedy
- Produced by: Julie Phillips
- Starring: Kyle Richards; Wendell Wellman; John Putch
- Cinematography: Makoto Watanabe
- Edited by: Carole Kravetz
- Music by: Cengiz Yaltkaya
- Production company: York Image Productions
- Distributed by: New World Pictures
- Release date: April 25, 1989
- Running time: 85 minutes
- Country: United States
- Language: English

Curfew is a 1989 American horror film directed by Gary Winick, in his directorial debut, and starring Kyle Richards, Wendell Wellman, John Putch, Christopher Knight, and Frank A. Miller. Its plot follows two demented brothers who, after escaping from prison, invade the home of the district attorney who prosecuted them, terrorizing him, his wife, and their teenage daughter.

Curfew, as well as Winick's second film Out of the Rain (1991), were described by Keith Bailey of Unknown Movies as "little-seen thrillers, the former so violent that it suffered censorship and certification problems" in the United Kingdom.

The film was rejected for video by the British Board of Film Classification in 1988. It was finally released fully uncut in 2002.

== Plot ==
Teenager Stephanie Davenport spends a night out with her friends and boyfriend, John, while her parents, Walter and Megan, prepare to depart for a weekend vacation from their small California town. Meanwhile, brothers Ray and Bob Perkins—both inmates on death row, the latter developmentally disabled—escape from prison and descend upon the town, seeking revenge against Stephanie's father, the district attorney who sentenced them to death for a brutal murder. Ray and Bob first terrorize and murder a psychologist who analyzed them prior to their trial, before murdering a man they hitch a ride with and stealing his car. The two then break into the home of Judge Collins and his wife and bludgeon them to death with a gavel.

Later that night, Stephanie quickly returns home to make her 10:00 p.m. curfew, and sees Mrs. Alva, the babysitter Stephanie's parents have hired to oversee her, lying in the guest bedroom. Stephanie assumes Mrs. Alva is sleeping, unaware that she is in fact dead. Upstairs, Stephanie is confronted by Ray and Bob, who attack her. She flees to the neighboring Collins' home and finds their corpses before hitching a ride with an elderly man. Ray and Bob force the man's car off the road, and beat him unconscious when he exits the car. Stephanie manages to flee in the vehicle, driving to a nearby diner, where she begs for help. Sam, a young police officer, escorts Stephanie back home, where they are greeted unexpectedly by Stephanie's mother. Sam presumes Stephanie to be playing a prank, and releases her to the assumed safety of her home, unaware that both Ray and Bob have been holding her parents hostage inside all evening.

Ray and Bob proceed to subject the Davenports to a night of humiliation and torture: First, they force Walter at gunpoint to walk on broken glass before shooting at him, causing him to collapse on the broken shards. Ray subsequently taunts Megan, making her garishly apply makeup to her face before forcing her into a bathtub. Meanwhile, Walter and Stephanie are barricaded in the basement where Bob stands watch. Stephanie manages to leverage Bob's attraction to her in her favor, persuading him to let her see her mother. When Bob frees her, Walter incapacitates him, and the two rush upstairs to find Ray holding Megan at gunpoint before all three are forced back into the basement.

Meanwhile, a drunken John arrives with his friends Pete and Monica at the Davenport house to see Stephanie, John intent on having sex with her. The trio sneak inside, assuming Stephanie to be the only person in the house. Pete finds Mrs. Alva's corpse before he is stabbed to death by Ray. Meanwhile, John and Monica enter an empty bedroom upstairs and have sex but are soon interrupted by Ray, who murders them. Meanwhile, Sam comes across the elderly man Ray and Bob assaulted on the road. When the old man describes his attackers, Sam realizes their features match those of Ray and Bob, now subjects of an all-points bulletin. As Ray prepares to kill Stephanie, Walter, and Megan via makeshift electric chairs, Sam arrives at the Davenport home. Stephanie pleads with Bob, offering herself to him sexually in an attempt to cause a rift between the brothers. Her attempt proves effective, as the brothers begin to fight, culminating in Ray murdering Bob with an electric drill. Sam descends into the basement, only to be shot and injured by Ray. Ray follows the injured Sam upstairs and steals his gun, while Stephanie manages to free herself from the makeshift electric chair. When Ray returns to the basement, Stephanie emerges from the shadows and shoots him to death.

Some time later, Stephanie has a nightmare in which she leaves her home and gets into John's car, only to find Bob seated in the driver's seat.

== Cast ==
- Kyle Richards as Stephanie Davenport
- Wendell Wellman as Richard "Ray" Perkins
- John Putch as Bob Perkins
- Frank A. Miller as Walter Davenport
- Jean Brooks as Megan Davenport
- Peter Nelson as John
- Niels Mueller as Pete
- Nori Morgan as Monica
- Peggy Rae as Mrs. Mary Cox
- Christopher Knight as Sam
- Robert Romanus as Jack
- Guy Remsen as Dr. Franklin
- Peggy Pope as Mrs. Alva
- Douglas Robinson as Judge Collins
- Marla Rix as Mrs. Collins

== Release ==
The film was released by New World Pictures direct-to-video on April 25, 1989.

=== Critical response ===
TV Guide gave the movie a tepid review, granting 1 out of 4 stars in its rating and noting that it "has a few interesting ideas that seem to get lost in all of the cheap gore and shock effects. Among the actors, Wellman is actually pretty good, and Richards has a strong screen presence, but they are stuck in a muddled and cheaply made film, badly directed by Gary Winick... The players all act at a fever pitch and the generally brutal murder sequences are ham-handedly accompanied by noisy music or sound effects. The underlying theme--of Stephanie's sexual awakening and her punishment as a result--is glossed over to concentrate solely on the torture and murder of other characters.

== Soundtrack ==
=== Track listing ===
1. "Calendar" by The Dig
2. "Feel Alive" by The Dig
3. "Barbararay" by The Dig
4. "Foreign Girl" by The Dig
5. "Calm or a Storm" by The Dig
6. "The Cure" by Ru Ready
7. "Wear Me Out" by The Dig
8. "The Unknown" by The Dig
