= Heather McGowan =

American writer

- Education: Brown University
- Occupation: Author
- Notable work: Duchess of Nothing; Schooling

Heather McGowan is an American writer. She is the author of the novels Friends of the Museum, Schooling, and Duchess of Nothing. Schooling was named a Best Book of the Year by Newsweek, Detroit Free Press and The Hartford Courant.

== Education ==
McGowan has a master in fine arts from Brown University.

== Career ==
McGowan’s original screenplay Tadpole, about a 15 year old boy's relationships with much older women, was made into a film directed by Gary Winick and starring Sigourney Weaver. The film won Best Director at Sundance Film Festival in 2002 and was subsequently released by Miramax.

In 2006, McGowan and British visual artist Liam Gillick collaborated to produce the limited edition book, Le Montrachet, published by Rocky Point Press in 2006.

McGowan won the Rome Prize in Literature in 2011. She was awarded the 2012 Mary Ellen von der Heyden Berlin Prize Fellowship for Fiction at the American Academy in Berlin.

== Selected publications ==
- Schooling, Doubleday/Faber UK, ISBN 978-0-385-50138-5
- Duchess of Nothing, Bloomsbury/Faber UK, ISBN 978-1-59691-066-9
- Friends of the Museum, Washington Square Press, ISBN 978-1-668-03127-8

== Personal life ==
She lives in Provincetown, Massachusetts.
