= Tadpole (film) =

2002 film by Gary Winick

- Theatrical release poster
- Directed by: Gary Winick
- Written by: Heather McGowan; Niels Mueller
- Produced by: Gary Winick; Alexis Alexanian; Dolly Hall
- Starring: Aaron Stanford; Bebe Neuwirth; Sigourney Weaver; John Ritter; Robert Iler; Kate Mara
- Cinematography: Hubert Taczanowski
- Edited by: Susan Littenberg
- Music by: Renaud Pion
- Distributed by: Miramax Films
- Release dates: January 11, 2002 (Sundance); August 2, 2002 (United States limited)
- Running time: 78 minutes
- Country: United States
- Languages: English; French
- Budget: $150,000
- Box office: $3.2 million

Tadpole is a 2002 American romantic comedy film directed by Gary Winick, written by Heather McGowan and Niels Mueller, and starring Sigourney Weaver, Bebe Neuwirth, Aaron Stanford, John Ritter, Robert Iler, and Kate Mara.

A low-budget production, Tadpole premiered at the 2002 Sundance Film Festival where it won rave reviews and was awarded the Dramatic Directing Award for Winick. Miramax acquired the film for distribution and gave it a limited theatrical release on August 2, 2002.

== Plot ==
Oscar Grubman is a precocious 15-year-old boy traveling home from school for Thanksgiving. He speaks fluent French, quotes Voltaire and finds girls of his own age to be too shallow and superficial, as well as too immature and inexperienced in life. When Miranda Spear, an attractive girl from school, shows interest in Oscar, he politely brushes her off. Oscar confides in his friend Charlie that he is in love with a mature woman and plans to win her heart during Thanksgiving break.

Oscar arrives at his family’s apartment, Columbia University history professor and author, Stanley Grubman and stepmother, the passionate cardiologist, Eve. That evening, the Grubmans hold a party where Stanley introduces him to a girl of his age, but Oscar rebuffs her as well while staring at the object of his affection: his stepmother.

Oscar tries to open up to her, but the unsuspecting Eve doesn't notice that he is making advances. Stanley tells him to walk the girl home, but he hails her a cab. Depressed from his failure with the older woman, Oscar goes to a bar with a fake ID and gets drunk. He bumps into Eve's best friend, chiropractor Diane Lodder, who offers to take him to her own apartment seeing his current condition. Once there, Diane begins to massage him and they end up having sex. Oscar wakes the next morning and has an awkward encounter with Diane's boyfriend, Phil.

Back at home, Oscar plans a surprise lunch for Eve, but first Stanley inquires about where Oscar spent the night. Oscar makes up a story about meeting Miranda Spear from school. He brings lunch to Eve at her lab, where he opens up to her once more, pondering the use of the heart as a symbol for affection. Together, they decide that the liver should be the new symbol for love.

Their conversation is interrupted by a phone call from Stanley, who mentions that Diane will be joining them for dinner. Worried that Diane will tell Eve about their tryst, Oscar finds Diane at a tea room with several of her friends. All act as though they know about the previous evening, and most of the women twice his age flirt with him. Oscar makes Diane promise to keep last night a secret from Stanley and especially Eve.

At dinner, Diane drinks and behaves coyly. She plays footsie with Oscar and flirts with him in French. After she excuses herself from the table, Oscar follows to confront her. She kisses him while not being totally out of Stanley's view, after which Diane admits to Stanley and Eve that she and Oscar are lovers.

The next day, Diane explains to Eve that she found Oscar a charming young man. Eve condemns her for seducing a mere 15-year-old, but Diane says many women would have done the same, including perhaps Eve. Later that day, Eve and Oscar play a tense round of tennis, lobbing insults at each other, ending up with Oscar getting hit in the head with a ball. Oscar explains to Eve that he only did what he did with Diane because he was drunk, and she was wearing Eve's scarf. Eve immediately understands that he is in love with her. They share a passionate kiss, but Eve eventually breaks away.

At the end of Thanksgiving break, Eve and Stanley take Oscar to the train. Eve asks Oscar how his liver feels, and he replies that it hurts, but is not broken. She also tells him how much she loves his father. On the train, Oscar meets up with Charlie, and runs into Miranda. Miranda quotes Voltaire, "If we do not find something pleasant at least we will find something new" and looks longingly at Oscar. Charlie notices this, and Oscar tells Charlie that Miranda smells nice. Charlie asks about Eve, and Oscar states that his obsession with Eve was not as important as it seemed. Charlie doesn't understand his friend, but Oscar smiles as the train rolls on.

== Cast ==
- Aaron Stanford as Oscar Grubman
- Sigourney Weaver as Eve Grubman
- John Ritter as Stanley Grubman
- Bebe Neuwirth as Diane Lodder
- Robert Iler as Charlie
- Adam LeFevre as Phil
- Peter Appel as Jimmy the Doorman
- Alicia Van Couvering as Daphe Tisch
- Kate Mara as Miranda Spear
- Ron Rifkin as Professor Tisch
- Paul Bulter as Professor Sherman
- Hope Chernov as Samantha Steadman
- Debbon Ayer as Jean
- John Feltch as Bob Spear

== Production ==
The film was shot on digital video cameras in just two weeks on an estimated budget of $150,000.

== Reception ==
=== Release ===
The film premiered at the 2002 Sundance Film Festival, where it was acquired by Miramax for $5 million.

The film made $3,200,241 worldwide; from $2,891,288 in North America and $308,953 in other territories. The film opened with $80,682 in its opening weekend (7/19-21) and raised 34% ($273,373) in the second weekend.

=== Critical response ===
On review aggregation website Rotten Tomatoes, 77% of critics, based on 108 collected reviews, gave the film a positive review. The site's consensus states, "Presenting a sexual awakening with surprising candor, Tadpole is a spiky coming of age tale that benefits from a deeply felt performance by Aaron Stanford and a script that is unafraid to wade into morally choppy waters." Metacritic, which uses a weighted average, assigned the film a score of 71 out of 100, based on 31 critics, indicating "generally favorable" reviews.

Though some critics cited the film's modest filming methods as drawbacks, multiple reviews praised the performances. Stephen Holden of The New York Times wrote, "Were it not for the charm of Mr. Stanford...Oscar might have emerged as an insufferably pretentious hothouse flower. But the actor (23 when the movie was made) flawlessly captures his character's aching, doe-eyed sincerity and yearning goodness." Holden added "At its most endearing, the film conveys the same intense identification with Oscar's thoughts and mood swings that Mr. Salinger brought to his legendary character, and its adolescent-eyed view of Manhattan's Upper East Side as a glowing, mysterious wonderland is deeply Salinger-esque."

Lisa Schwarzbaum of Entertainment Weekly concurred, stating "The best instinct of director Gary Winick (The Tic Code) and screenwriters Heather McGowan and Niels Mueller is to emphasize old-fashioned courtliness in this likable comedy – good manners that go a long way toward convincing viewers the movie's got something fresh to say even while it's set in familiar territory."

Roger Ebert gave a more mixed review where he voiced his discomfort with the film's premise, writing "Too much has happened in the arena of sexual politics since 'The Graduate' and I kept thinking that since Oscar was 15 and his stepmother and her friend were about 40, this plot would have been unthinkable if the genders had been reversed." He also critiqued the film's level of plausibility and its development of characters, but praised Bebe Neuwirth's performance. Ebert concluded, "A longer movie (this one is barely feature length at 77 minutes) might have made the relationships more nuanced and convincing."

== Awards and nominations ==
Tadpole won the following awards:

- Sundance Film Festival Directing Award (Gary Winick)
- Seattle Film Critics Society Award for Best Supporting Actress (Bebe Neuwirth)
- National Board of Review Award for Special Recognition for Excellence in Filmmaking

It received the following nominations:

- Sundance Film Film Festival Grand Jury Prize (Winick)
- Satellite Award for Best Actor in a Motion Picture, Comedy or Musical (Aaron Stanford) and Best Actress in a Supporting Role, Comedy or Musical (Neuwirth)
- Chlotrudis Award for Best Supporting Actress (Neuwirth)

== Soundtrack ==
The following songs can be heard in the film.

- Charles Trenet – "Ménilmontant"
- John M. Davis – "The Revenger's Waltz"
- Adam Cohen – "She"
- Micheline Van Hautem (nl:Mich Van Hautem) – "Deux fois"
- Naresh Solal – "Moonlit Temple"
- King Lear Jet – "Ammo"
- The Creatures of the Golden Dawn – "Hemlock Row"
- John M. Davis – "Waltz in C-sharp minor, Op. 64, No. 2 (Chopin)"
- John M. Davis – "Waltz in A minor, Op. 34, No. 2"
- John M. Davis – "Nocturne in E-flat major, Op. 9, No. 2"
- Everything but the Girl – "The Only Living Boy in New York"
- David Bowie – "Changes"
- Adam Cohen – "Couche-moi sur tes lèvres"

== See also ==
- Roger Dodger (film)
