= Pensacola School of Liberal Arts =

Secondary school in Florida, United States

- 301 E Gadsden St; Pensacola, Florida 32501; United States

Information
- Type: Private secondary
- Established: 1969; 57 years ago
- Founder: William J. Holston
- Grades: 7-12
- Colors: Royal blue & white
- Tuition: US$6,525 (2023-2024)
- Website: www.pensacolasola.org

The Pensacola Private School Of Liberal Arts (SOLA) is a non-sectarian private secondary school in Pensacola, Florida. It was established in 1969 by William J. Holston as an alternative to public schools. The school serves students in grades 7 through 12 and emphasizes small class sizes, reportedly limited to fewer than 18 students per class. According to GreatSchools, enrollment was reported as 44 students for the 2023-24 school year.

== History ==
Holston was the band director at Pensacola High School and principal of Woodham High School for the 1968-1969 School Year before establishing SOLA. He left Woodham High and the public school district for various reasons, the chief being the commotion sparked by the rezoning of schools.

SOLA was initially located in Pensacola's Sacred Heart Hospital on 12th Avenue. In the early 1980s Holston moved SOLA to his once private residence located on 13th Avenue. SOLA remained at that location until 2013, when the school downsized and returned to Sacred Heart Hospital.
