= John Putch =

American actor and filmmaker (born 1961)

- Born: July 27, 1961 (age 65); Chambersburg, Pennsylvania, United States
- Occupations: Actor, film director, screenwriter
- Years active: 1973–present
- Parents: William H. Putch; Jean Stapleton

John Putch (born July 27, 1961) is an American actor and filmmaker. He is best known for his recurring role as Bob Morton on the 1970s sitcom One Day at a Time and as Sean Brody in the film Jaws 3-D.

== Life and career ==
Putch was born in Chambersburg, Pennsylvania. He began his career as an actor at the age of five in summer theater company, The Totem Pole Playhouse, run by his father William H. Putch (1924–1983). He is also the son of actress Jean Stapleton (1923–2013), who met William Putch while performing at the Playhouse. His parents married soon after.

After guest starring on his mother's series All in the Family (playing a Boy Scout in 1973 episode "Archie Is Branded"), he was remembered by producer Norman Lear who cast him in a recurring role as Bob Morton on the sitcom One Day at a Time, appearing in 14 episodes from 1976 to 1983. Putch's next notable role was in the film Jaws 3-D (1983) co-starring as Sean Brody the son of Roy Scheider's character, Martin Brody. His other film credits include appearances in The Sure Thing (1985), Welcome to 18 (1986), Men at Work (1990), Skeeter (1993), and the horror film Curfew (1989), opposite Kyle Richards.

For much of the 1980s into the 1990s he guest starred in a number of notable television series namely, Family Ties, The Fall Guy, The Love Boat, Hill Street Blues, Newhart, Star Trek: The Next Generation, 21 Jump Street, Seinfeld, Home Improvement, Wings as well as a starring role in the sitcom Room for Two and a major role in The Wave (1981).

In 1985, Putch made his directorial debut with the short film Waiting to Act starring Ed Begley, Jr., Helen Hunt and Lance Guest. He began focusing more on directing in the mid-1990s, directing independent films and episodic television. His television directing credits include Big Bad Beetleborgs, Son of the Beach, Grounded for Life, Scrubs, Ugly Betty, My Name Is Earl, Tycus, Rush Hour, APB, Cougar Town, and American Housewife. Some of Putch's film directing credits include Bachelor Man starring David DeLuise, The Poseidon Adventure, American Pie Presents: The Book of Love, Murder 101: College Can Be Murder starring Dick Van Dyke and Mojave Phone Booth starring Annabeth Gish and Steve Guttenberg, which won numerous independent film awards.

In 2007 Putch began making a trilogy of comedies surrounding US Route 30 in his home state of Pennsylvania. Route 30, Route 30, Too! and Route 30, Three! respectively take place in south central Pennsylvania in Franklin and Adams counties.

== Partial filmography ==
- All in the Family (1973) - Boy Scout
- Family Ties (1982, 1984) - Pete, Neil
- Jaws 3-D (1983) - Sean Brody
- The Sure Thing (1985) - Mastin
- Vision Quest (1985) - Uncredited
- Waiting to Act (1985) - Tom's Director
- Impure Thoughts (1986) - Danny Stubbs
- Welcome to 18 (1986) - Cory
- Star Trek: The Next Generation (1988, 1989) - Mordock, Mendon
- Curfew (1989) - Bob Perkins
- Men at Work (1990) - Mike
- Seinfeld (1991) “The Stranded” - Roy
- Skeeter (1993) - Hamilton
- Clear and Present Danger (1994) - Blackhawk Co-Pilot
- Camp Nowhere (1994) - Neil Garbus
- Star Trek Generations (1994) - Journalist #2
- Same River Twice (1996) - Skinner
- Spoiler (1998) - Doctor
- Freedom Strike (1998) - Stanley Shaw
- City of Angels (1998) - Man in Car
- The Souler Opposite (1998) - Lester
- Chain of Command (2000) - Agent Joe Lambert
- Mach 2 (2000) - Tim Mandell
- Crash Point Zero (2001) - George
- The Confidence Man (2001) - Strip Club MC
