= American Housewife =

American television sitcom (2016–2021)

- Genre: Sitcom
- Created by: Sarah Dunn
- Starring: Katy Mixon; Diedrich Bader; Meg Donnelly; Daniel DiMaggio; Julia Butters; Ali Wong; Carly Hughes; Giselle Eisenberg
- Narrated by: Katy Mixon
- Composers: Erica Weis; Orr Rebhun; Jonathan Sadoff
- Country of origin: United States
- Original language: English
- No. of seasons: 5
- No. of episodes: 103 (list of episodes)

Production
- Executive producers: Sarah Dunn; Aaron Kaplan; Kenny Schwartz; Rick Wiener; Katy Mixon (season 4–5); Randall Winston (season 5); Jonathan Fener (season 5); Ruben Fleischer (pilot)
- Producer: Katy Mixon (season 1–3)
- Editor: David L. Bertman
- Camera setup: Single-camera
- Running time: 22 minutes
- Production companies: Eight Sisters Productions; Wiener & Schwartz Productions; Kapital Entertainment; ABC Signature (Note: Credited as ABC Studios through season 4)

Original release
- Network: ABC
- Release: October 11, 2016 – March 31, 2021

American Housewife is an American television sitcom created and written by Sarah Dunn and executive produced with Aaron Kaplan, Kenny Schwartz, Rick Wiener, and, for the pilot only, Ruben Fleischer. The show, which premiered on ABC on October 11, 2016, is a Kapital Entertainment–ABC Signature co-production.

In May 2021, ABC canceled the series after five seasons and 103 episodes, leaving multiple cliffhangers.

== Premise ==
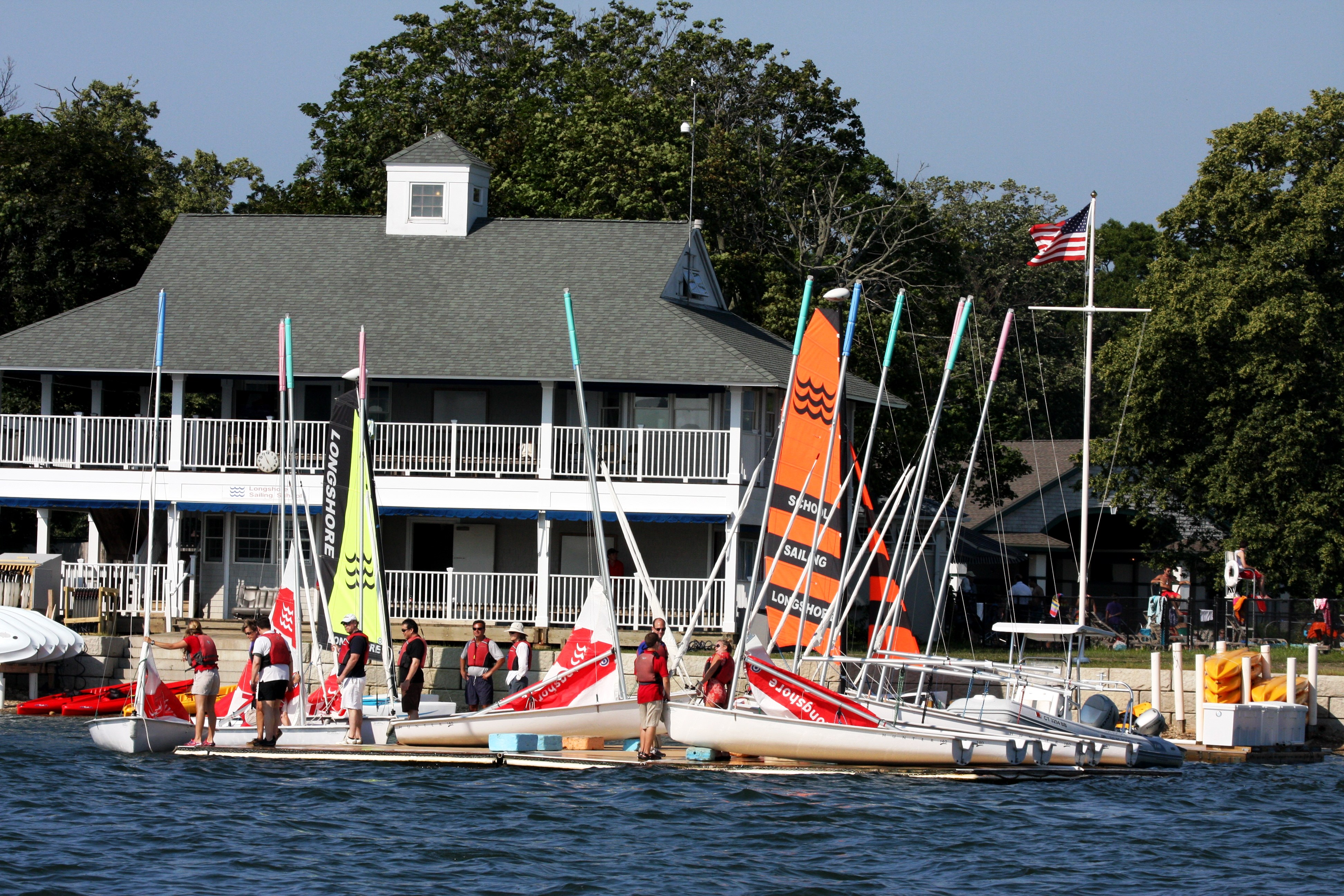
Westport, Connecticut

The series chronicles the daily life of Katie Otto, a wife and mother who tries to maintain her sense of self and family while dealing with the wealthy, pretentious, arrogant housewives and their privileged children in her new hometown of Westport, Connecticut. Compared to the other residents who own big houses, Kate and her family are renters of a more modest home. She lives with Greg, her level-headed husband who is a university professor of history, and the father of their three children. Taylor is their athletic, headstrong, but somewhat dimwitted eldest daughter who wants to fit in with her peers; Oliver is their savvy, ambitious, and snarky middle child; and Anna-Kat, sweet but obsessive-compulsive, is the youngest and Katie's obvious favorite. Katie frequently vents her frustration to and seeks advice from her two closest friends: Doris, whose strict parenting style sharply contrasts with Katie's, and Angela, a divorced lesbian mother and lawyer with a relaxed parenting style.

== Episodes ==
Season	Episodes	Originally released	
Season	Episodes	First released	Last released
1	23	October 11, 2016	May 16, 2017
2	24	September 27, 2017	May 16, 2018
3	23	September 26, 2018	May 21, 2019
4	20	September 27, 2019	May 13, 2020
5	13	October 28, 2020	March 31, 2021

== Cast ==
=== Main cast ===
- Katy Mixon as Kate "Katie" Otto, a housewife who is desperate to not make her children spoiled Westport people who only value money and looks. She returns to work and becomes a professional party planner in seasons 3-4, which she later quits and sets up a lasagna business which she sells by season 5.
- Diedrich Bader as Greg Otto, Katie's husband, a history lecturer known for his awkward but caring manner.
- Johnny Sequoyah (pilot) and Meg Donnelly (since episode 2) as Taylor Otto, Katie's and Greg's teenage daughter who loves sports and singing but is not great with academics
- Daniel DiMaggio as Oliver Otto, Katie's and Greg's teenage son and middle child who is obsessed with making money and being successful. He is a ballet dancer and later develops business ideas.
- Julia Butters (seasons 1–4) and Giselle Eisenberg (season 5) as Anna-Kat Otto, Katie's and Greg's youngest daughter, who has OCD. The family moved to Westport so Anna-Kat could attend the Special Education Program to help with her OCD.
- Ali Wong as Doris (seasons 1–season 5 episode 7), one of Katie's best friends, who is a rich and spoiled housewife; she is strict with her four children, hates her husband, and enjoys tormenting Oliver.
- Carly Hughes as Angela (seasons 1–4, guest season 5), one of Katie's best friends, who is a lawyer known for her serial rotation of girlfriends. She is a chronic commitment-phobe and loves yoga and spirituality.

=== Recurring cast ===
- Leslie Bibb as Viv (seasons 1–4), the Ottos' wealthy and insensitive but also endearing neighbor.
- Jessica St. Clair as Chloe Brown Mueller, Katie's nemesis who owns a shop in town and is a momfluencer; she is obsessed with money and appearance
- Wendie Malick as Kathryn, Katie's self-centered mother
- Logan Pepper as Cooper Bradford, Oliver's wealthy best friend, whose emotionally distant parents are the wealthiest in Westport and are almost always out of town. This causes Cooper to see Katie and Greg as surrogate parents, even going so far as to call them Mom and Dad. He moves in with the Ottos in season 5 and pursues the culinary arts.
- Amarr M. Wooten as Eyo (seasons 1–2, 5), Taylor's first boyfriend, whose mother is Tara Summers
- Evan O'Toole as Franklin, Anna-Kat's best friend and later boyfriend
- Carly Craig as Tara Summers, Katie's nemesis
- Sara Rue as Nancy Granville, a Southport wife whose husband is gay
- Jeannette Sousa as Suzanne, a Southport wife
- Barret Swatek as Sage, a Southport wife
- Jerry Lambert as Principal Michael Ablin
- Peyton Meyer as Trip Windsor (seasons 2–5), Taylor's boyfriend and later fiancé; he struggles academically, but is very caring, kind, and loving, forming strong bonds with all the Ottos, especially Anna-Kat
- George Hamilton as Spencer Blitz (seasons 2–3), neighbor and one-time billionaire investor who has just returned home, having been released to house arrest after spending 20 years in federal prison who befriends Oliver and becomes a mentor/grandfather figure
- Nikki Hahn as Gina Tuscadero (seasons 2–3), Oliver's first girlfriend and fellow ballet dancer
- Bruno Amato as Louie Tuscadero (seasons 2–3), Gina's uncle and owner of Tuscadero's Pizza, where Oliver later works
- Ravi Patel as Grant (seasons 2–3), Greg's incompetent assistant who is obsessively attached to him
- Julie Meyer as Maria, Chloe Brown Mueller's employee, later Principal Ablin's wife
- Jason Dolley as Kevin (seasons 3–4), Katie's co-worker at the party planning agency
- Milo Manheim as Pierce (season 3), Taylor's manipulative love interest during her brief breakup from Trip
- Reylynn Caster as Brie (seasons 3–4), Oliver's second girlfriend
- Matt Shively as Lonnie Spears (season 4–5), a famous YouTuber prankster who hires Greg to ghostwrite his autobiography; he later helps Greg with his City Council campaign
- Jim Rash as Walker Montgomery (season 5), a waiter at Katie's "second breakfast" cafe; he is from a wealthy family but forced to wait tables as punishment
- Holly Robinson Peete as Tami Gaines (season 5), Katie's close friend from before her move to Westport
- Kyrie McAlpin as Grace Gaines (season 5), Tami's youngest and most troublesome child
- Chibuikem Uche as Andre (season 5), a teaching assistant in Taylor's college philosophy class, with whom she starts to bond
- Jake Choi as J.D. (season 5), a luxury hotel manager and aspiring father recently divorced from his husband, who becomes Katie's and Tami's friend
- Tenzing Norgay Trainor as Trevor (seasons 4–5), Oliver's classmate with whom he develops a business idea

=== Guest cast ===
- Kate Flannery as Crossing Guard Sandy, Katie's nemesis
- Jenny O'Hara as Mrs. Smith, the Ottos' landlord
- Timothy Omundson as Stan Lawton, Chloe's ex-husband who runs the historical guild and befriends Greg
- Jay Mohr as Alan, Viv's selfish ex-husband
- Will Sasso as Billy, Katie's college best friend
- Tiffani Thiessen as Celeste, Angela's ex-wife and Greg's friend
- Barry Bostwick as Thomas Otto, Greg's neglectful and selfish father
- Julia Duffy as Amanda Otto, Greg's mother
- Mallory Jansen as Nina, Oliver's tough ballet teacher
- Bebe Wood as Ellen, Taylor's friend
- Nathan Fillion as himself; Katie convinces him to come to the Spring dance.
- Victoria Justice as Harper, a new young housewife
- Patrick Duffy as Marty, Katie's father
- Cheyenne Jackson as Johnny Diamond
- Ryan Seacrest as himself
- Katy Perry as herself
- Luke Bryan as himself
- Lionel Richie as himself
- Thomas Lennon as Simon
- Vanessa Lachey as Crissy
- Alessandra Ambrosio as herself
- Alex Landi as himself
- Kelly Ripa as Whitney
- Drew Carey as Mr. Green
- Ryan Stiles as Bill Doty
- Kathy Kinney as Lunch Lady
- Ed Weeks as British Greg Otto, Greg's half-brother
- Ian Gomez as Brecken Phillips
- Lisa Vanderpump as herself
- Madison Thompson as Lindsey Coolidge
- Jessica Walter as Margaret
- Joel McHale as Doyle Bradford, Cooper's father

== Production ==
=== Development ===
On January 28, 2016, it was announced that ABC had given the production a pilot order as The Second Fattest Housewife In Westport. The episode was written by Sarah Dunn who was expected to executive produce alongside Aaron Kaplan, Kenny Schwartz and Rick Wiener. Production companies involved with the pilot include Eight Sisters Productions, Weiner & Schwartz Productions, Kapital Entertainment, and ABC Studios. On May 12, 2016, ABC officially ordered the pilot to series. A few days later, it was announced that the series, now titled American Housewife, would premiere on October 11, 2016, and aired on Tuesdays at 8:30 P.M. On November 4, 2016, ABC picked up the series for a full season of 22 episodes and on December 13, an additional episode was ordered. On May 11, 2017, ABC renewed the series for a second season, which premiered on September 27, 2017. On May 11, 2018, ABC renewed the series for a third season of 23 episodes, which premiered on September 26, 2018. On May 10, 2019, ABC renewed the series for a fourth season; the first 15 episodes began to premiere on September 27, 2019, and on November 7, 2019, a back order of six episodes was announced.

On March 14, 2020, production on the fourth season was shut down following the impact of COVID-19, reducing season four from 21 episodes to 20. On May 21, 2020, ABC renewed the series for a fifth season, which premiered on October 28, 2020. On May 14, 2021, ABC canceled the series after five seasons. The cancellation was somewhat unexpected, as season 5 ended with multiple cliffhangers.

=== Casting ===
On February 17, 2016, it was announced that Katy Mixon had been cast in the pilot's lead role. In March 2016, it was reported that Carly Hughes, Ali Wong and Diedrich Bader had also joined the pilot's main cast. On June 27, 2016, it was announced that Meg Donnelly had been cast to replace Johnny Sequoyah in the pilot role of Taylor, the eldest daughter of the Katie and Greg characters.

On September 11, 2020, it was reported that Julia Butters was leaving the series ahead of its fifth season, reportedly to pursue other opportunities; the role of Anna-Kat was recast with Giselle Eisenberg. In November, Carly Hughes announced she had also left ahead of the fifth season, due to a toxic work environment. She appeared in the fifth-season premiere, the majority of which was filmed before production shut down in March. Following Hughes' departure, Holly Robinson Peete was cast in a recurring role meant to fill the void.

== Syndication ==
CMT aired reruns of American Housewife from 2020 until 2023. As of September 12, 2022, the series aired in local market syndication, covering roughly 85% of the United States.

== Reception ==
=== Critical response ===
American Housewife has received mixed reviews from television critics, with Katy Mixon's performance being praised as the show's highlight. The review aggregator website Rotten Tomatoes reported an approval rating of 58% for the show's first season, with an average rating of 6.14/10 and based on 38 reviews. The site's critical consensus reads, "American Housewife is boosted by a strong and enjoyable lead performance by Katy Mixon, yet her performance alone strains to sustain an excessively quirky show that relies too heavily on stereotypes." Metacritic, which uses a weighted average assigned the season a score of 60 out of 100, based on 25 critics, indicating "mixed or average reviews".

=== Ratings ===
Viewership and ratings per season of American Housewife
Season	Timeslot (ET)	Episodes	First aired		Last aired		TV season	Viewership rank	Avg. viewers (millions)	18–49 rank	Avg. 18–49 rating
Season	Timeslot (ET)	Episodes	Date	Viewers (millions)	Date	Viewers (millions)	TV season	Viewership rank	Avg. viewers (millions)	18–49 rank	Avg. 18–49 rating
1	Tuesday 8:30 pm	23	October 11, 2016	6.61	May 16, 2017	4.39	2016–17	65	6.21	43	1.8
2	Wednesday 9:30 pm	24	September 27, 2017	5.66	May 16, 2018	4.15	2017–18	84	5.58	52	1.6
3	Wednesday 8:30 pm (1–10); Tuesday 8:00 pm (11–23)	23	September 26, 2018	4.43	May 21, 2019	3.64	2018–19	87	5.10	60	1.3
4	Friday 8:00 pm (1–13); Wednesday 9:30 pm (14–16); Wednesday 9:00 pm (17–20)	20	September 27, 2019	3.34	May 13, 2020	3.04	2019–20	76	4.48	61	1.0
5	Wednesday 8:30 pm	13	October 28, 2020	3.45	March 31, 2021	2.72	2020–21	74	4.02	41	0.9

=== Accolades ===
Year	Award	Category	Recipient(s)	Result	Ref.
2017	People's Choice Awards	Favorite New TV Comedy	American Housewife	Nominated	

== Controversies ==
In November 2017, the episode "Boo-Who?" featured character Taylor Otto dressed up as a "pregnant Norwalk prom girl", poking fun at the city of Norwalk, Connecticut, which borders the show's location of Westport. Before this incident, there were various other episodes in which Norwalk was mocked: The characters refused to swim in a Norwalk swimming pool, acting like the pool water was diseased because of Norwalk people; one of the children took bets on how many of the girlfriends of Norwalk's basketball team would be pregnant post season; and Oliver Otto used a neighbor's Hispanic housekeeper to alter flawed Polo shirts and sell them to Norwalk students, believing that no Westport resident would buy them; Oliver ended up earning a significant amount of money. This brought condemnation from residents, school officials, and politicians of Norwalk. After a petition calling for the producers to stop "bullying" Norwalk garnered over 500 signatures and received media coverage, a Disney spokesperson released a statement saying "As a comedy, American Housewife isn't intended to offend anyone. We’ve heard the concerns of the people of Norwalk and have made the decision to omit any mentions of the city from future episodes".

In November 2020, Carly Hughes revealed her departure from the series resulted from a toxic work environment. In a statement, Hughes said, "I made the decision to leave to protect myself from that type of discrimination. As a Black woman in entertainment, I feel the responsibility to stand up for what I deserve, what we all deserve—to be treated equally." Allegations from Hughes and other crew members caused ABC to launch an investigation. Their findings resulted in creator Sarah Dunn no longer having an active producing role, Mark J. Greenberg stepping down as line producer, and showrunners Rick Wiener and Kenny Schwartz undergoing sensitivity training.
