= Gary Winick =

American filmmaker (1961–2011)

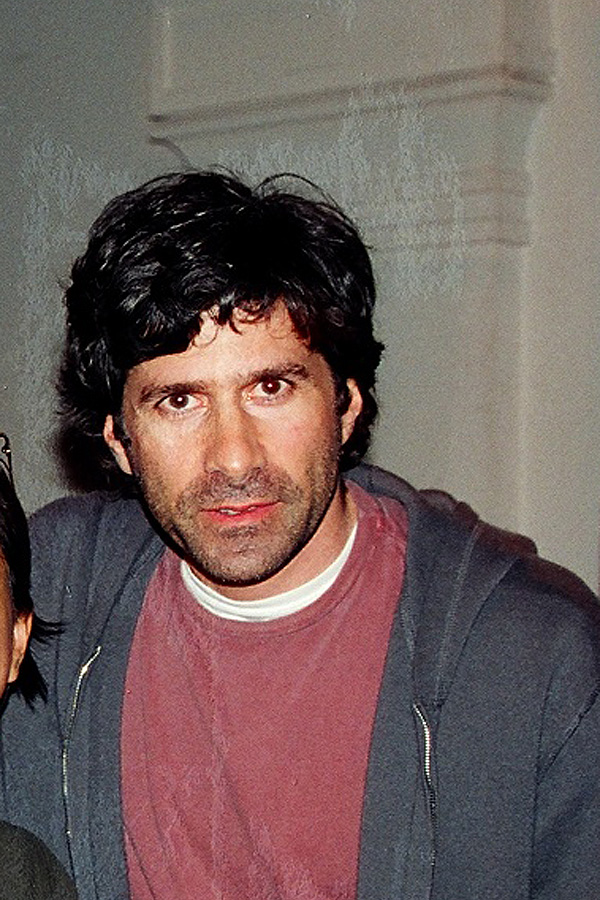
- Winick at a Tadpole screening at the Seattle International Film Festival in 2002
- Born: Gary Scott Winick; March 31, 1961; Manhattan, New York, U.S.
- Died: February 27, 2011 (aged 49); Manhattan, New York, U.S.
- Education: AFI Conservatory
- Occupation: Filmmaker
- Years active: 1979–2010

Gary Scott Winick (March 31, 1961 – February 27, 2011) was an American filmmaker whose films as a director include Tadpole (2002) and 13 Going on 30 (2004), and who also produced such films as Pieces of April (2003) and November (2004) through his New York City-based independent film production company InDigEnt.

== Biography ==
Born in Manhattan, New York City, Gary Winick attended Columbia Grammar and Preparatory School in that borough, graduating in 1979. A 1984 graduate of Tufts University, he later earned Master of Fine Arts degrees from both the University of Texas at Austin and the AFI Conservatory.

Winick directed Out of the Rain (1991), Tadpole (2002), 13 Going on 30 (2004), and the live-action remake of Charlotte's Web (2006). His final films were Bride Wars and Letters to Juliet. He produced films such as Pieces of April (2003) and November (2004) through his New York City-based independent film production company InDigEnt, founded in 1999.

== Death ==
Winick died in Manhattan on February 27, 2011, following a years-long battle with brain cancer. He was 49 years old.

== Filmography ==
Year	Title	Director	Producer	Writer
1989	Curfew	Yes	No	No
1991	Out of the Rain	Yes	No	No
1995	Sweet Nothing	Yes	Yes	No
1998	The Tic Code	Yes	No	No
2001	Sam the Man	Yes	Yes	No
2002	Tadpole	Yes	Yes	Story
2004	13 Going on 30	Yes	No	No
2006	Charlotte's Web	Yes	No	No
2009	Bride Wars	Yes	No	No
2010	Letters to Juliet	Yes	No	No

== Awards ==
- 2002 Independent Spirit John Cassavetes Award for producing Personal Velocity
