= Daniel DiMaggio =

American actor (born 2003)

- Born: July 30, 2003 (age 23)
- Education: Providence High School
- Occupation: Actor
- Years active: 2010–present
- Known for: American Housewife
- Father: Lou DiMaggio

Daniel DiMaggio (born July 30, 2003) is an American actor. He is best known for playing Oliver Otto on the ABC sitcom American Housewife.

== Early life ==
DiMaggio was born to actor and writer Lou DiMaggio, and actress Loretta Fox. In his personal time, he enjoys skateboarding, running marathons and baseball.

DiMaggio graduated magna cum laude from Providence High School in Burbank, California in 2021. He also attended Los Feliz Charter School For The Arts in Los Angeles for primary school, and Thomas Starr Middle School in Silver Lake.

Daniel participates in Disney's Magic of Storytelling campaign aimed to encourage children to read.

== Career ==
DiMaggio first started acting in commercials at the age of eight. His first production role was in the short film Geisho in 2010. He guest starred on Burn Notice as a young Michael Westen. He was also featured as a young Superman in the series Supergirl in 2016. In 2017, he had a role in Daddy's Home 2 as Young Dusty.

In 2016, DiMaggio was cast as Oliver Otto, the middle child on the ABC family sitcom American Housewife. The show debuted on October 11, 2016, and ran for five seasons. He has listed "The Maze" as his favorite episode. As part of his role as Oliver Otto, DiMaggio has been studying ballet since the show debuted. With no previous training, he took several classes a week to build his ability to perform on the show.

In 2019, DiMaggio appeared on an episode of Celebrity Family Feud, with his American Housewife co-stars, taking on the cast of Descendants 3.

== Filmography ==
=== Film ===
Year	Title	Role	Notes
2014	A Tiger's Tail	Tom Murphy	
2015	Tales of Halloween	Mikey	
2017	Daddy's Home 2	Young Dusty Mayron	

=== Television ===
Year	Title	Role	Notes
2013	Burn Notice	Young Michael Westen	Episode: "Psychological Warfare"
2014	Where the Bears Are	Trick or Treater #2	Episode: "Halloween Special"
2014	The Haunted Hathaways	Corky	Episode: "Haunted Secret"
2014	Divide & Conquer	Kyle Ball	Television film
2014–2016	Clarence	Brady	4 episodes
2016	Supergirl	Kal-El	Episode: "For the Girl Who Has Everything"
2016–2021	American Housewife	Oliver Otto	Main role
2016, 2018	The Loud House	Artie	2 episodes
2017–2018	Vampirina	Various voices	2 episodes
2022	NCIS	Noah Richter	Episode: "The Brat Pack"
2023	The Neighborhood	Kiefer	Episode: "Welcome to the Next Big Thing"
