= Sarah Dunn (author) =

American author and television writer

- Born: 1970 (age 55–56)
- Education: University of Pennsylvania
- Occupations: Author; television writer
- Spouse: Peter Stevenson (m. 2007)

Sarah Dunn (born 1970) is an American author and television writer. She is known for her novels The Big Love and Secrets to Happiness, and the ABC sitcom American Housewife, starring Katy Mixon.

== Life and career ==
After graduating from the University of Pennsylvania, Dunn spent several years working service jobs in Philadelphia, Pennsylvania, the experience of which informed her first book, The Official Slacker Handbook. Shortly afterward, she moved to Los Angeles, California, where she wrote for television series including Murphy Brown, Veronica's Closet, Spin City, and Bunheads. With Spin City co-creator Bill Lawrence, Dunn penned Michael J. Fox's final episode of the series.

Dunn is also a novelist whose works include The Big Love (2005), Secrets to Happiness (2009), and The Arrangement (2017). Her books have been translated into 19 different languages.

Dunn is a member of the all-female television writers group “The Ladies Room”, which also includes Vanessa McCarthy, Stephanie Birkitt, and Julie Bean. The group was founded in July 2016.

In November 2020, it was announced that, after an "extensive" HR investigation that took place between the fourth and fifth seasons of American Housewife following allegations of a toxic workplace made by Carly Hughes, Dunn would no longer have an active producing role in the series.

== Family ==
Dunn is married to former New York Observer executive editor Peter Stevenson. They married in 2007.

== Selected works ==
- The Official Slacker Handbook, 1994.
- The Big Love, 2005.
- Secrets to Happiness, 2009.
- The Arrangement, 2017
