= Carly Hughes =

American actress

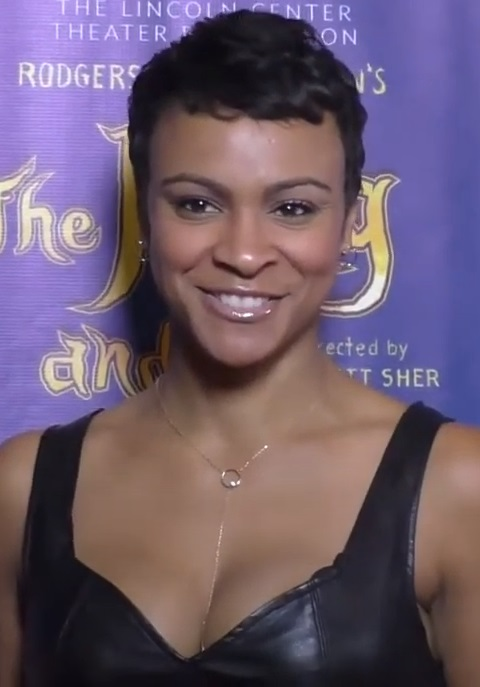
- Hughes in 2016
- Born: October 1, 1982 (age 44); St. Louis, Missouri, U.S.
- Occupation: Actress
- Years active: 2007–present

Carly Hughes (born October 1, 1982) is an American actress and singer, known for her role in the ABC comedy series, American Housewife (2016–2020).

== Early life ==
Hughes was born in St. Louis, Missouri and raised in Columbia, Maryland. Her first stage role was playing Robin Hood in Clemens Crossing Elementary School in fifth grade. She went on to Wilde Lake High School, and graduated from Pennsylvania State University in 2004 with a degree in musical theater.

== Career ==
She began her career appearing on Broadway shows, including Dr. Seuss' How the Grinch Stole Christmas!, Ragtime, Ghost The Musical, Pippin, Beautiful: The Carole King Musical, Cabin in the Sky, and Chicago.

In 2016, Hughes made her television debut with a series-regular role in the ABC comedy series American Housewife, playing, alongside Ali Wong, one of the title character's best friends. Hughes left the series after four seasons, saying in a November 2020 press statement, "I was no longer able to work in the toxic environment that was created on 'American Housewife.' I made the decision to leave to protect myself from that type of discrimination." An investigation by productions company ABC Signature led to "positive changes to the workplace and improvements to the culture", the company said in a statement in response, with series creator Sarah Dunn and line producer Mark J. Greenberg exiting the series. After leaving the series, Hughes was cast in her first leading role, in the Lifetime Christmas television movie The Christmas Edition.

== Filmography ==
=== Film ===
Year	Title	Role	Notes
2018	Brampton's Own	Allyson	
2019	Blind Sight	Talon	Short film
2020	Malibu Rescue: The Next Wave	Miss Eldred	

=== Television ===
Year	Title	Role	Notes
2016–2020	American Housewife	Angela	Series regular, 91 episodes
2017	Curb Your Enthusiasm	Wife #1	Episode: "Fatwa!"
2018	Insatiable	Etta Mae Barnard	Episodes: "Pilot" and "WMBS"
2018	Hell's Kitchen	Herself	Blue guest diner; Episode: "A Fish Out of Water"
2020	The Christmas Edition	Jackie	Television film
2020	It's Pony	Baggage Handler / Carol Singer / Donation Person	2 episodes; voice role
2022	Baby Shark's Big Show!	Jozi/Moms	Episode: "Operation Happy Mommies"; voice role
2022	Dynasty	Geneva Abbott	2 episodes
2023	SuperKitties	Amara	Recurring role (voice)
2023	General Hospital	Elise Vance	2 episodes
2024	NCIS	Vicky Meyer	Episode: "Left Unsaid"
