= Out of the Rain =

- Directed by: Gary Winick
- Starring: Bridget Fonda; Michael O'Keefe; Mary Mara
- Music by: Cengiz Yaltkaya
- Release date: May 23, 1991
- Running time: 95 minutes
- Country: United States
- Language: English

Out of the Rain is a 1991 American drama film directed by Gary Winick. The film starred Bridget Fonda and Michael O'Keefe.

== Plot ==
In upstate New York Jimmy Reade is thought to have committed suicide with a shotgun. His older brother Frank comes home to attend the funeral. The older brother moves into the deceased brother's trailer home. He then begins to learn about his deceased brother's involvement in narcotics.

== Production ==
The film was directed and produced by Gary Winick. The screenplay was written by Shem Bitterman. The film stars Bridget Fonda and Michael O'Keefe. It was filmed in upstate New York.

== Reception ==
In a 1990 review, TV Guide said that the film, "offers only superficial cynicism, small-time film noir with nothing to say. Characters and performances alike are one-note downers."
