= Two and a Half Men season 6 =

Two and a Half Men
- Season 6
- DVD cover art
- Showrunner: Lee Aronsohn
- Starring: Charlie Sheen; Jon Cryer; Angus T. Jones; Marin Hinkle; Conchata Ferrell; Holland Taylor
- No. of episodes: 24

Release
- Original network: CBS
- Original release: September 22, 2008 – May 18, 2009

Season chronology
- ← Previous; Season 5 Next → Season 7

The sixth season of the American television sitcom Two and a Half Men aired on CBS from September 22, 2008 to May 18, 2009.

== Cast ==
=== Main ===
- Charlie Sheen as Charlie Harper
- Jon Cryer as Alan Harper
- Angus T. Jones as Jake Harper
- Marin Hinkle as Judith Harper-Melnick
- Conchata Ferrell as Berta
- Holland Taylor as Evelyn Harper

=== Recurring ===
- Jennifer Taylor as Chelsea (Note: Prior to appearing as the main character Chelsea from season 6 onwards, Taylor had appeared briefly in three previous episodes as three different minor characters: as Suzanne in the series' pilot, as Tina in "Last Chance to See Those Tattoos", and as Nina in "Our Leather Gear is in the Guest Room".)
- Ryan Stiles as Herb Melnick
- Kelly Stables as Melissa
- Melanie Lynskey as Rose

=== Guest ===
- Martin Mull as Russell
- Rena Sofer as Chrissy
- Alicia Witt as Dolores Pasternak
- Michael Clarke Duncan as Jerome Burnett
- Tinashe Kachingwe as Celeste Burnett
- Bellamy Young as Diane
- Jon Polito as Mr. Sharipa
- Emilio Estevez as Andy
- James Earl Jones as himself
- Carol Kane as Shelly
- Iqbal Theba as Don
- Jane Lynch as Dr. Linda Freeman
- Diora Baird as Wanda
- J.D. Walsh as Gordon
- Meagen Fay as Martha
- Joel Murray as Petey
- Emmanuelle Vaugier as Mia

== Episodes ==
No. overall	No. in season	Title	Directed by	Written by	Original release date	Prod. code	U.S. viewers (millions)
116	1	"Taterhead is Our Love Child"	James Widdoes	Story by : Chuck Lorre & Lee Aronsohn; Teleplay by : Mark Roberts & Don Foster & Jim Patterson	September 22, 2008	3T7401	14.88
Charlie runs into an ex-girlfriend, Chrissy (Rena Sofer), who has a son named Chuck who looks, dresses, and acts disturbingly like Charlie. Alan takes great pleasure making fun of the situation. Charlie learns that condoms are only 98% effective and, thinking that Chuck is his son, he pays Chrissy a large lump sum and promises to send her a check every month for Chuck's maintenance. Just after Charlie leaves Chrissy's apartment, it is revealed that she is only Chuck's babysitter, his name is actually Jeremy, and her plan to extort money from Charlie has succeeded. Title quotation from: Charlie, to Alan, satirizing a remark by Alan, by whose logic Jake might be their son.
117	2	"Pie Hole, Herb"	James Widdoes	Story by : Chuck Lorre & Lee Aronsohn; Teleplay by : Eddie Gorodetsky & Susan Beavers	September 29, 2008	3T7402	13.58
Alan lends Charlie $38, which Charlie has no interest in repaying. Alan seeks revenge to get the money back, and pumps out gas from Charlie's Mercedes to his own, but still claims Charlie owes him $24.78 as there wasn't enough petrol in the tank to amortize the full $38. Charlie accuses Alan of being cheap, ends up angrily throwing him out of the house, so Alan and Jake temporarily stay with a friendly Herb and angry Judith. But after Herb bonds with Charlie and Alan crosses a line with Judith, she takes measures to reset the situation, forcing Alan to apologize to Charlie and forcing Charlie to take him back. However, after she and Herb leave, Charlie locks Alan out of the house. Meanwhile, Evelyn offers Jake his first job. Title quotation from: Judith, to Herb, when he asks Alan where he'll be staying after Charlie kicks him out.
118	3	"Damn You, Eggs Benedict"	Jean Sagal	Story by : Mark Roberts & Don Foster; Teleplay by : Chuck Lorre & Lee Aronsohn	October 6, 2008	3T7403	14.07
Charlie seeks to broaden his horizons and improve his sex life by taking up cooking, but his focus on egg recipes has an unexpected result. Alan and Jake try to emulate Charlie's lifestyle: Alan by dating two women at once, and Jake by getting drunk, but they find out the hard way that Charlie's way of life is not for them. Jake ends up vomiting violently with Charlie at his side. Alan's first date finds out he has another woman, because of his inability to lie convincingly, and when he tries the "honesty is the best policy" approach with the other woman, he ends up getting Tasered. Title quotation from: Charlie, once he realizes he's made a mistake in his egg recipe.
119	4	"The Flavin' and the Mavin'"	James Widdoes	Story by : Chuck Lorre & Lee Aronsohn; Teleplay by : Eddie Gorodetsky & Jim Patterson	October 13, 2008	3T7404	14.72
While Alan's car is in the shop, Charlie grudgingly drives Alan to work, but he cheers up when he meets Alan's receptionist Melissa (Kelly Stables). Alan begs Charlie not to make a move on her, because she is very good at her job and for a low wage, and Alan is convinced that it would end badly for himself. Of course, that merely spurs Charlie on. Alan's misgivings prove correct when Charlie breaks up with Melissa after they have spent a long weekend together, mostly in Charlie's bed. Melissa is so angry, and so dangerous, as she drives them to work, that Alan feels he has to give into her demands for a raise, health insurance, and a paid vacation. First appearance of: Melissa Title quotation from: Alan, quoting Jerry Lewis to Charlie while they're in Charlie's car on the way to Alan's workplace.
120	5	"A Jock Strap in Hell"	Jean Sagal	Story by : Chuck Lorre & Lee Aronsohn; Teleplay by : Don Foster & Eddie Gorodetsky & Susan Beavers	October 20, 2008	3T7405	14.63
The guys bump into Jake's former teacher Delores Pasternak (now played by Alicia Witt, before played by Missi Pyle) who tells them that the way Charlie dumped her caused her to have a nervous breakdown, lose her job as a teacher and become a stripper. Guilt-stricken, Charlie tries to help her with a room at his house and a job tutoring her ex-student Jake, but later he finds out she has also become strictly religious. Charlie's solution is the same as the first time. Title quotation from: Jake asks if the eternally damned have to wear those and Charlie responds "Yes, but not your own."
121	6	"It's Always Nazi Week"	James Widdoes	Story by : Chuck Lorre & Lee Aronsohn; Teleplay by : Mark Roberts & Jim Patterson	November 3, 2008	3T7406	12.76
Herb tells Charlie and Alan that he and Judith have been having marital problems. Charlie offers Herb advice on how to stand up for himself, resulting in Judith kicking Herb out of the house. Alan, overjoyed by the situation, goes to Judith's house pretending that he has to pick up Jake's book, and confronts her crying. He hugs her and calms her down, resulting in the two of them having sex. Meanwhile, Jake has been sent to Charlie's for three months, and Herb bonds with Charlie. Title quotation from: Alan, moaning about a TV show that Charlie watches.
122	7	"Best H.O. Money Can Buy"	James Widdoes	Story by : Chuck Lorre & Lee Aronsohn; Teleplay by : Mark Roberts & Don Foster & Eddie Gorodetsky	November 10, 2008	3T7407	14.50
Alan tries to escape Judith's grasp as Charlie and Herb go on the prowl to pick up women. They later end up going back to Herb's hotel room with two prostitutes, where Herb declares his love for Judith and races over to win her back. Alan and Judith begin arguing and decide to end their "relationship" when Herb turns up. Later on in the episode, Jake reveals that Judith has become pregnant - leaving Alan completely shocked; Charlie explains this to Jake that Alan's doing math in his head. Meanwhile, to cover up Alan's escapade with Judith, Charlie screws with Jake by leading him to believe he's being sent to military school. Title quotation from: Herb to Charlie and two prostitutes, about his train set when they arrive back at his hotel room.
123	8	"Pinocchio's Mouth"	Jeff Melman	Story by : Chuck Lorre & Mark Roberts; Teleplay by : Don Foster & Jim Patterson	November 17, 2008	3T7408	15.18
Charlie's new girlfriend Chelsea (Jennifer Taylor) asks him to spend the night at her place, which puts Charlie well outside of his comfort zone. During the night, he finds a lot of problems and cannot sleep. He gets up to leave but steps on Chelsea's cat which screams loudly, waking Chelsea up and causing her to angrily kicking Charlie out. Charlie talks her into giving him another chance, but when Charlie makes too many adjustments she decides she'll happily spend nights at his place from now on. Meanwhile, a pregnant Judith has grounded Jake for mooning a bunch of girls in school and Alan has difficulty keeping Jake obeying the rules of his punishment. First appearance of: Chelsea Title quotation from: Charlie, describing the discomfort of a wooden toilet seat at Chelsea's apartment.
124	9	"The Mooch at the Boo"	Jeff Melman	Story by : Chuck Lorre & Lee Aronsohn; Teleplay by : Eddie Gorodetsky & Susan Beavers	November 24, 2008	3T7409	14.95
Jake disappears with Celeste (Tinashe Kachingwe), the daughter of Charlie's new neighbor Jerome, a former NFL player (Michael Clarke Duncan), and Charlie is left to cover his back. Charlie talks to Jerome and tells him not to be so overprotective of his daughter, and the two become friends. Meanwhile, Alan scores a hot date (Bellamy Young) with the help of Charlie's Mercedes. He takes her back to Evelyn's house as Evelyn is away on holiday, and ends up being tricked into wearing one of her dresses as the woman steals Alan's wallet and Charlie's car. Worse, Alan is put on hold when he tries to phone the police. Even worse, Evelyn returns from vacation and sees Alan in her dress. Title quotation from: Alan, to his date, referring to Charlie's address when he calls.
125	10	"He Smelled the Ham, He Got Excited"	Jeff Melman	Story by : Mark Roberts; Teleplay by : Don Foster & Susan Beavers	December 8, 2008	3T7410	15.59
When Evelyn offers to pay for Jake's college education, Alan becomes listless since he no longer feels the need to work or do anything productive with his life. Charlie later comes up with the idea of Alan paying him rent, which he agrees to, but then declines the bigger number that would give Alan a say in what goes on in the house. Jake discovers a hidden talent in the culinary arts that might open up a career path as a chef, but it ends badly when Jake sets fire to Evelyn's kitchen and the fire brigade has to be called. Title quotation from: Alan, when Charlie tells him that Jake bit into his own fingers while eating a sandwich.
126	11	"The Devil's Lube"	Jeff Melman	Story by : Chuck Lorre & Lee Aronsohn & Mark Roberts; Teleplay by : Don Foster & Eddie Gorodetsky, Susan Beavers & Jim Patterson	December 15, 2008	3T7411	17.92
One of Charlie's old partners in crime, Andy (Emilio Estevez), dies while visiting Charlie, leaving him to reevaluate his own reckless lifestyle and tell everyone in his life (except Alan) how much he cares about them. At the funeral, Charlie begins to worry about his own life and Alan tells him there has always been one person in his life on whom he can depend on: Alan! Just kidding, it's Rose, who Charlie almost proposes to before finding out he's physically fine and returning to his old ways. Berta reveals to Alan that Charlie revised his will to leave her everything if he dies, and tells a horrified Alan that she'll be nice and give him extra time to leave the house before she'll have him evicted then. Title quotation from: Andy, to Charlie, about spitshining the Devil's pitchfork.
127	12	"Thank God for Scoliosis"	Jeff Melman	Story by : Eddie Gorodetsky & Jim Patterson; Teleplay by : Chuck Lorre & Mark Roberts	January 12, 2009	3T7412	17.10
Temptation is the theme of this episode as Charlie and Jake fight for the affections of a waitress, Janine (Emily Rose), while Alan and his receptionist Melissa (Kelly Stables), who has recovered from her disastrous fling with Charlie, fight to suppress their mutual attraction and have to deal with Melissa's loopy mother (Carol Kane). Title quotation from: Alan to Melissa, just before he learns he has no patients for another 30 minutes.
128	13	"I Think You Offended Don"	Jeff Melman	Story by : Chuck Lorre & Mark Roberts; Teleplay by : Lee Aronsohn & Don Foster & Jim Patterson	January 19, 2009	3T7413	16.09
Judith is pregnant with a baby girl and Alan is convinced that he is the father; he helps Herb paint the baby's room, but gets thrown out after he upsets Judith once too often. Jake is in a bad mood because of girl problems and Charlie offers his advice. Title quotation from: A drunken Charlie, when Alan upsets his cab driver.
129	14	"David Copperfield Slipped Me a Roofie"	Jeff Melman	Story by : Mark Roberts; Teleplay by : Don Foster & Jim Patterson	February 2, 2009	3T7414	16.55
Convinced that Alan's family doesn't fully appreciate him after they throw him a pathetic 40th birthday party, Melissa invites Alan to live with her and her mom, whose disturbing hobbies quickly send Alan back to whence he came. Title quotation from: Berta, about the magician at Alan's birthday party.
130	15	"I'd Like to Start with the Cat"	Jeff Melman	Story by : Chuck Lorre; Teleplay by : Mark Roberts & Don Foster & Susan Beavers	February 9, 2009	3T7415	15.00
Charlie has a relationship problem with Chelsea, who thinks he is still his old self. Charlie panics and suggests couples counseling with Dr. Freeman, which she accepts, while Alan plays their problems to his benefit. Jake is tired of Charlie stealing his dessert and decides to mark what's his. Title quotation from: Charlie to Chelsea, after she claims he doesn't know her very well.
131	16	"She'll Still Be Dead at Halftime"	Jeff Melman	Story by : Mark Roberts; Teleplay by : Don Foster & Eddie Gorodetsky	March 2, 2009	3T7416	15.47
Charlie must remove a half-naked woman named Wanda (Diora Baird) from his bedroom before Chelsea returns from her ex-mother-in-law's funeral; Jake seems to recognize Wanda but doesn't realize that she is a pin-up girl on one of his posters. Meanwhile, Alan won't let Jake drive the car. Title quotation from: Charlie to Chelsea, when she interrupts the basketball game they are watching.
132	17	"The 'Ocu' or the 'Pado'?"	James Widdoes	Story by : Susan Beavers & Jim Patterson; Teleplay by : Mark Roberts & Don Foster	March 9, 2009	3T7417	13.44
Charlie, to his own surprise, tells Chelsea he loves her, but he doesn't get the response he wanted. After a visit to Dr. Freeman fails to help, Charlie decides he must take drastic measures to restore the 'balance of power'. Title quotation from: Alan, asking Charlie what part of the word "ocupado" he doesn't understand after he barges in on Alan in the bathroom.
133	18	"My Son's Enormous Head"	James Widdoes	Story by : Lee Aronsohn & Jim Patterson; Teleplay by : Susan Beavers & Eddie Gorodetsky	March 16, 2009	3T7418	14.12
Chelsea becomes ill and Charlie must look after her. He is not thrilled about it but he does try, and ends up taking advice and help from Alan. Title quotation from: Alan, to Charlie, about Jake's birth.
134	19	"The Two Finger Rule"	James Widdoes	Story by : Chuck Lorre & Lee Aronsohn; Teleplay by : Susan Beavers & Eddie Gorodetsky & Jim Patterson	March 30, 2009	3T7419	14.56
Charlie, Alan, Gordon, Herb, and Jerome (Michael Clarke Duncan) reminisce about sexual experiences after Chelsea finds some photos on Charlie's phone; Alan's receptionist Melissa is still punishing him for having sex with her mother, and Charlie resolves to fix things with Chelsea because he doesn't want to end up like any of these guys. Meanwhile, Jake goes out with Jerome's daughter Celeste again. Title quotation from: Herb, referencing Judith's eyebrow policy; Charlie notes that Chelsea had a different "two-finger rule."
135	20	"Hello, I am Alan Cousteau"	James Widdoes	Story by : Chuck Lorre & Mark Roberts; Teleplay by : Lee Aronsohn & Susan Beavers & Eddie Gorodetsky	April 13, 2009	3T7420	15.03
Charlie's desperate to make sure Chelsea and Evelyn don't befriend each other following their first meeting; Evelyn bribes Alan with a waterproof Rolex and Jake with a pizza so they can't help Charlie turn Chelsea against her; Charlie ultimately turns the tables and gets his revenge by befriending Chelsea's not-very-tolerant mother Martha (Meagen Fay). Title quotation from: Alan, pretending to be Jacques Cousteau while he is testing out his waterproof Rolex in a jug full of water.
136	21	"Above Exalted Cyclops"	James Widdoes	Story by : Chuck Lorre & Lee Aronsohn; Teleplay by : Don Foster & Eddie Gorodetsky	April 27, 2009	3T7421	14.16
Alan lets Chelsea fix him up on a blind date with one of her friends. The friend turns about to be Rose, shocking both Alan and Charlie. Things actually go well, but Rose, still smitten about Charlie, reverts to her old stalker self and Alan ends up with one of his model cars glued to his testicles. Title quotation from: Rose to Charlie, about rankings in the Ku Klux Klan while describing Chelsea's mother.
137	22	"Sir Lancelot's Litter Box"	Jon Cryer	Story by : Chuck Lorre & Lee Aronsohn & Don Foster; Teleplay by : Susan Beavers & Eddie Gorodetsky & Jim Patterson	May 4, 2009	3T7422	14.17
Charlie and Alan both face lifestyle changes when Chelsea moves into the house: Charlie is annoyed with Chelsea changing things, and Alan is annoyed at having her spare stuff in his room. Title quotation from: Chelsea, to Charlie, when he spots the litter box near his shower.
138	23	"Good Morning, Mrs. Butterworth"	Mark Roberts	Story by : Don Foster & Sid Youngers; Teleplay by : Mark Roberts & Eddie Gorodetsky	May 11, 2009	3T7424	13.11
Charlie takes advantage of Alan and Chelsea's fast friendship by having Alan do all of the activities that Chelsea likes and Charlie hates; Alan takes up ventriloquism and pushes Charlie to his limit when he "text-blocks" Charlie while he is in bed with Chelsea, causing Charlie and Chelsea to have an argument. Title quotation from: Charlie, to Alan, when he is cooking.
139	24	"Baseball Was Better with Steroids"	Lee Aronsohn	Story by : Mark Roberts & Susan Beavers; Teleplay by : Chuck Lorre & Lee Aronsohn	May 18, 2009	3T7423	16.18
The return of Mia (Emmanuelle Vaugier) finds Charlie questioning his devotion to Chelsea; the guys rush a laboring Judith to the hospital; Alan reunites with Melissa (Kelly Stables), who now works as a hospital clerk, and struggles in his attempt to write a screenplay; Judith gives birth to Jake's baby sister, but the parentage is still unknown; Herb breaks his leg shortly after Judith breaks her water; Charlie runs into Mia in the coffee shop, resulting in a cliff-hanger season finale. Title quotation from: Charlie to Chelsea, while watching baseball in bed.

== Ratings ==
=== US Nielsen ratings ===
No.	Episode	Rating	Share	Rating/Share (18-49)	Rank (18-49)	Viewers (millions)	Rank (Viewers)	Ref
1	"Taterhead Is Our Love Child"	9.1	13	5.3/12	4	14.88	11	
2	"Pie Hole, Herb"	8.4	12	4.7/11	4	13.58	11	
3	"Damn You, Eggs Benedict"	8.8	13	5.1/12	6	14.07	10	
4	"The Flavin' and the Mavin"	9.0	13	5.3/12	3	14.72	8	
5	"A Jock Strap in Hell"	8.9	13	5.1/12	5	14.63	10	
6	"It's Always Nazi Week"	8.0	11	4.6/10	7	12.76	11	
7	"Best H.O. Money Can Buy"	8.9	13	4.9/11	8	14.50	12	
8	"Pinocchio's Mouth"	9.3	13	5.3/12	4	15.18	9	
9	"The Mooch at the Boo"	9.0	13	5.3/12		14.95		
10	"He Smelled the Ham, He Got Excited"	9.5	14	5.2/13	4	15.59	4	
11	"The Devil's Lube"	10.6	16	5.6/13		17.92		
12	"Thank God for Scoliosis"	10.2	15	5.6/13	5	17.10	7	
13	"I Think You Offended Don"	9.8	14	5.4/12	5	16.09	4	
14	"David Copperfield Slipped Me a Roofie"	10.0	15	5.5/12	6	16.55	5	
15	"I'd Like to Start with the Cat"	9.2	13	4.8/11	7	15.00	7	
16	"She'll Still Be Dead at Halftime"	9.2	13	4.9/11	7	15.47	7	
17	"The "Ocu" or the "Pado"?"	8.1	12	4.8/12	6	13.44	12	
18	"My Son's Enormous Head"	8.5	13	4.8/12	7	14.12	9	
19	"The Two Finger Rule"	8.5	13	5.2/13	4	14.56	9	
20	"Hello, I am Alan Cousteau"	8.8	13	5.3/13	3	15.03	6	
21	"Above Exalted Cyclops"	8.7	13	4.9/12	4	14.16	8	
22	"Sir Lancelot's Litter Box"	8.6	13	5.0/12	4	14.17	9	
23	"Good Morning, Mrs. Butterworth"	8.2	12	4.5/12	7	13.11	13	
24	"Baseball Was Better with Steroids"	9.9	15	5.3/14	3	16.18	7	

=== Canadian ratings ===
Order	Episode	Viewers (100'00s)	Rank
1	"Taterhead is Our Love Child"	9.96	#19
2	"Pie Hole, Herb"	8.09	#30
3	"Damn You, Eggs Benedict"	8.51	#27
4	"The Flavin' and the Mavin'"	10.47	#22
5	"A Jock Strap in Hell"	9.89	#22
6	"It's Always Nazi Week"	11.13	#21
7	"Best H.O. Money Can Buy"	10.55	#26
8	"Pinochhio's Mouth"	10.19	#25
9	"The Mooch at the Boo"	10.14	#22
11	"The Devil's Lube"	11.41	#11
12	"Thank God for Scoliosis"	16.17	#12
13	"I Think You Offended Don"	15.78	#10
14	"David Copperfield Slipped Me a Roofie"	18.37	#6
15	"I'd Like to Start With the Cat"	14.56	#12
16	"She'll Still Be Dead at Halftime"	16.21	#10
17	"The 'Ocu' or the 'Pado?'"	14.34	#14
18	"My Son's Enormous Head"	17.24	#11
19	"The Two Finger Rule"	17.50	#8
20	"Hello, I am Alan Cousteau"	20.84	#5
21	"Above Exalted Cyclops"	15.39	#14
22	"Sir Lancelot's Litter Box"	14.87	#15
23	"Good Morning, Mrs. Butterworth"	15.30	#10
24	"Baseball Was Better with Steroids"	16.14	#6
