= Two and a Half Men season 3 =

Two and a Half Men
- Season 3
- DVD cover art
- Showrunner: Lee Aronsohn
- Starring: Charlie Sheen; Jon Cryer; Angus T. Jones; Marin Hinkle; Conchata Ferrell; Holland Taylor
- No. of episodes: 24

Release
- Original network: CBS
- Original release: September 19, 2005 – May 22, 2006

Season chronology
- ← Previous; Season 2 Next → Season 4

The third season of the American television sitcom Two and a Half Men aired on CBS from September 19, 2005 to May 22, 2006.

== Production ==
The executive producers of the show for this season were the show's creators Chuck Lorre and Lee Aronsohn. The show's production companies were Chuck Lorre Productions, The Tannenbaum Company and Warner Bros. Television. The head writers for this season were Chuck Lorre and Lee Aronsohn. Other writers in this season were: Susan Beavers, Eddie Gorodetsky, Don Foster, Mark Roberts, Jeff Abugov and Jim Patterson. Gary Halvorson, Asaad Kelada, Rob Schiller, Jerry Zaks, Lee Aronsohn and James Widdoes were the directors for this season.

== Cast ==
=== Main ===
- Charlie Sheen as Charlie Harper
- Jon Cryer as Alan Harper
- Angus T. Jones as Jake Harper
- Marin Hinkle as Judith Harper
- Conchata Ferrell as Berta
- Holland Taylor as Evelyn Harper

=== Recurring ===
- April Bowlby as Kandi
- Melanie Lynskey as Rose
- Emmanuelle Vaugier as Mia

=== Guest ===
- Sandra Purpuro as Mona
- Stephanie Erb as Mrs. Mindy Schmidt
- Natalie Zea as Colleen
- Jodi Lyn O'Keefe as Isabella
- Martin Sheen as Harvey
- June Squibb as Margaret
- Cloris Leachman as Norma
- Josie Davis as Sandy
- Jane Lynch as Dr. Linda Freeman
- J.D. Walsh as Gordon
- Jon Lovitz as Archie Baldwin
- Gail O'Grady as Mandi
- Kevin Sorbo as Andy
- Julia Campbell as Francine

== Awards and nominations ==
This season of the series received seven Primetime Emmy Award nominations and received its first nomination for Outstanding Comedy Series, but lost to The Office. Charlie Sheen received his first Emmy nomination for Outstanding Lead Actor in a Comedy Series, while Jon Cryer received his first Emmy nomination for Outstanding Supporting Actor in a Comedy Series. Martin Sheen received a nomination for Outstanding Guest Actor in a Comedy Series for playing Rose's father, Harvey. Charlie Sheen also received a Golden Globe Award nomination for Best Performance by an Actor in a Television Series - Musical or Comedy. The show also received a nomination for the Producers Guild of America Award for Best Comedy Series. Angus T. Jones won a Young Artist Award for Best Performance in a TV Series (Comedy) - Supporting Actor.

== Episodes ==
No. overall	No. in season	Title	Directed by	Written by	Original release date	Prod. code	U.S. viewers (millions)
49	1	"Weekend in Bangkok with Two Olympic Gymnasts"	Gary Halvorson	Chuck Lorre & Lee Aronsohn	September 19, 2005	2T6501	15.04
The satellite dish in Charlie's house is not working and Alan offers to climb up on the roof and fix it. He manages to do so, but falls off the roof and badly injures himself. He tells Charlie to ring Judith and tell her not to bring Jake over as Alan is unable to look after him, but Charlie offers to do so. Jake then talks Charlie into taking him out to dinner and then to the video store - pushing Charlie more and more to his limits with his rudeness and persuading behavior. After Jake ruins Charlie's chances of hooking up with a woman in the video store, Charlie tries to drop him back at Judith's, only to find her unavailable. Jake then laughs and Charlie chases him. Title quotation from: Charlie, after Alan asks him if his injuries spell "weekend dad".
50	2	"Principal Gallagher's Lesbian Lover"	Gary Halvorson	Story by : Susan Beavers & Eddie Gorodetsky; Teleplay by : Chuck Lorre & Lee Aronsohn	September 26, 2005	2T6503	14.37
Jake gets suspended from school after drawing an offensive picture of a girl in his class that has large breasts. Alan has to have a meeting with the school about this, and asks Charlie to look after his office that day. While at the office, Charlie mistakenly hires a masseuse who later turns out to be a prostitute. This brings in more and more customers and the business turns into a brothel. Meanwhile, at the school, Alan meets the mother of the girl that Jake insulted, and manages to insult her and Jake's principal and embarrass himself. Title quotation from: Alan, naming a female who may come round to kick his ass later that night.
51	3	"Carpet Burns and a Bite Mark"	Gary Halvorson	Story by : Chuck Lorre; Teleplay by : Lee Aronsohn & Don Foster	October 3, 2005	2T6505	14.21
Alan has been dating a lot, and Charlie soon finds out that it has been one woman - his ex-wife, Judith. He tries to stop Alan, and even brings Rose, Evelyn and Berta to interfere - but Alan ignores them all. After having sex with Judith and getting into yet another argument with her (this time about their dull sex life while married) Alan decides not to see her anymore. Jake almost walks in on the two on numerous occasions, causing Alan to leap out of Judith's window and return to Charlie's home in his underwear. Title quotation from: Charlie, to Alan, explaining that a dinner can end well.
52	4	"Your Dismissive Attitude Toward Boobs"	Gary Halvorson	Story by : Chuck Lorre & Lee Aronsohn; Teleplay by : Eddie Gorodetsky & Mark Roberts	October 10, 2005	2T6502	15.24
Berta wants to move into the house for a few days as her brother is staying at her place and Alan says she can. Charlie isn't happy about the fact that Alan didn't ask his permission, causing a rift between the two. Berta encourages the two to argue, and Alan angrily moves out and goes apartment hunting with Evelyn. But the apartment he moves into is terrible, and he begs Charlie to let him remain at the beach house. It is later revealed that Berta doesn't even have a brother. Title quotation from: Charlie, when Jake doesn't want to see an R-rated movie.
53	5	"We Called It Mr. Pinky"	Gary Halvorson	Story by : Mark Roberts & Susan Beavers; Teleplay by : Chuck Lorre & Lee Aronsohn	October 17, 2005	2T6504	15.56
A woman that Charlie has been dating tells him she loves him. Charlie responds with "thank you," and the woman takes umbrage to this. She says that Charlie has unresolved mother issues and Rose says the same during a talk the two later have. Charlie later confronts his mother about these issues. Meanwhile, Jake asks Charlie and Alan for advice about a girl at school because she gives him a cupcake. Jake later realizes that he doesn't need a girl as he can cook his own cupcakes, which actually taste good. Title quotation from: Evelyn, to Charlie, saying the nickname for his penis.
54	6	"Hi, Mr. Horned One"	Gary Halvorson	Story by : Eddie Gorodetsky & Mark Roberts; Teleplay by : Chuck Lorre & Lee Aronsohn	October 24, 2005	2T6506	16.77
Charlie begins dating a strange, spiritual darker woman named Isabella (Jodi Lyn O'Keefe). Alan tries to talk him out of it because he dislikes her and finds her creepy. When Isabella finds out that Alan thinks she's a bad influence on Jake, she seemingly puts a "spell" on him, causing him to have an angry looking stye on his eye. Isabella takes Charlie to a party and she and her friends drug him and try to convince him to sell his soul to the devil. Later, it turns out that Isabella knows Evelyn, and she tells Isabella to leave Charlie alone, while he, Alan and Jake accompany Evelyn to a fancy-dress party. Title quotation from: Jake, during a seance with Isabella.
55	7	"Sleep Tight, Puddin' Pop"	Gary Halvorson	Story by : Eddie Gorodetsky & Don Foster; Teleplay by : Chuck Lorre & Lee Aronsohn	November 7, 2005	2T6507	16.19
Rose arranges for Charlie and Alan to host a small party for Rose's birthday, and after a night of much drinking, Charlie wakes up to find Rose in his bed. Her father, Harvey (Martin Sheen), later comes to ask Charlie what his intentions are towards Rose. When Evelyn shows up, Harvey takes a liking to her and while she enjoys his attentions for a while, he then shows behaviour that is much like his daughter with Charlie. Title quotation from: Harvey, spying on Evelyn as she's going to bed at Charlie's home.
56	8	"That Voodoo That I Do Do"	Gary Halvorson	Story by : Chuck Lorre & Lee Aronsohn; Teleplay by : Eddie Gorodetsky & Mark Roberts	November 14, 2005	2T6508	15.17
Charlie sees an attractive ballet teacher named Mia (Emmanuelle Vaugier) at a coffee shop, but she isn't interested in him, causing him to go head over heels to win her. Desperate to woo her, Charlie bribes and tricks Jake into taking ballet lessons so he can get closer to her. The problem is that Jake gets a crush on her as well. In the end, Charlie manages to get closer to her, much to Jake's anger and dismay. First appearance of: Mia Title quotation from: Charlie, about making his move on Mia.
57	9	"Madame and Her Special Friend"	Asaad Kelada	Story by : Jeff Abugov & Susan Beavers; Teleplay by : Chuck Lorre & Lee Aronsohn	November 21, 2005	2T6509	15.75
While Charlie's having a shower with his latest girl, Kimber (April Bowlby), Charlie's elderly neighbour, Norma (Cloris Leachman), arrives at Charlie's and requests to have Kimber's car moved, but she then takes a liking to Alan. Later on, she bribes Alan with a platinum Rolex and a Beverly Hills company for him if he sleeps with her which proves to have fatal consequences. Meanwhile, Charlie tries to stop Jake from sending money to a TV priest. First appearance of: April Bowlby, as Kimber. Bowlby would reappear in Episode 13 as Kandi. Title quotation from: Bobby the waiter, while making the order for Norma and Alan.
58	10	"Something Salted and Twisted"	Rob Schiller	Story by : Eddie Gorodetsky & Mark Roberts; Teleplay by : Chuck Lorre & Lee Aronsohn	November 28, 2005	2T6510	16.53
After another snide comment from his mother, Alan vows to stop seeking the approval of women. He goes to Charlie, who offers his help by taking him to a bar to get a girl and get drunk, which ends badly. Title quotation from: Charlie, after the bar waitress offers him some pretzels.
59	11	"Santa's Village of the Damned"	Rob Schiller	Story by : Chuck Lorre & Lee Aronsohn; Teleplay by : Don Foster & Susan Beavers	December 19, 2005	2T6512	17.71
Alan starts dating Sandy (Josie Davis), his cooking instructor and a woman with a Martha Stewart complex. She stays for weeks after Charlie and Alan start liking her food and getting fat, and she disrupts their home with her obsessive compulsive nature. Alan is further horrified when he finds out that Sandy still believes in Santa Claus. Title quotation from: Charlie, after seeing his own house decorated by Alan's girlfriend.
60	12	"That Special Tug"	Rob Schiller	Story by : Don Foster & Susan Beavers; Teleplay by : Chuck Lorre & Lee Aronsohn	January 9, 2006	2T6513	17.20
While out with Charlie, Alan has an emotional breakdown - in a bookstore, in the cinema, and finally in Charlie's car (where Charlie has a breakdown and kicks him out from the car). This drives Charlie to see his therapist and explain the problems of Alan. Title quotation from: Charlie, while talking to two women about his "depression".
61	13	"Humiliation is a Visual Medium"	Rob Schiller	Story by : Chuck Lorre & Lee Aronsohn; Teleplay by : Mark Roberts & Eddie Gorodetsky	January 23, 2006	2T6511	17.07
Charlie finds himself in a relationship that is not based on sex. After he suggests to Mia that since they're not having sex, he should have sex with someone else to satisfy himself, Mia instantly breaks up with him. Charlie sinks into a mild depression, and after Jake fails to make him feel better, Alan decides to help Charlie win Mia back. After this again fails, Charlie decides to woo Kandi (April Bowlby). After Mia catches him, Charlie breaks it off with Kandi and he and Mia finally start a committed relationship. Title quotation from: Alan, while explaining to Charlie how to get Mia to forgive him.
62	14	"Love Isn't Blind, It's Retarded"	Gary Halvorson	Story by : Chuck Lorre & Lee Aronsohn & Jeff Abugov; Teleplay by : Don Foster & Susan Beavers	February 6, 2006	2T6514	16.33
Mia tells Charlie that since Kandi has been calling him for a while, he should let her know he's in a committed relationship, which Charlie only pretends to do when Alan runs off with her, causing Mia to leave in anger. After apologizing to Mia and briefly meeting her parents, Charlie takes Mia to an expensive hotel so they may finally have sex, but the evening doesn't start off too great. Meanwhile, Alan spends the night with Kandi and then asks her out again the next morning with Charlie's permission. Kandi says yes. Title quotation from: Charlie, as he talks to Alan about his consummation.
63	15	"My Tongue is Meat"	Gary Halvorson	Story by : Eddie Gorodetsky & Mark Roberts; Teleplay by : Chuck Lorre & Lee Aronsohn	February 27, 2006	2T6515	17.04
Charlie has trouble keeping up with Mia's healthy lifestyle, which includes morning runs, protein shakes and no fast food, cigars or alcohol. Charlie eventually begins drinking, smoking and even smuggling hamburgers with the help of Rose behind Mia's back. She eventually finds out while she and Charlie are out eating dinner, where Charlie finally lets out his anger causing Mia to break up with him permanently. Charlie then disappears to Vegas for a few days to get over this. Meanwhile, Jake's repeated talks of topics such as the Death Penalty begin to irritate Alan. Title quotation from: Charlie, after Mia kisses him and notices his breath smells of meat.
64	16	"Ergo, the Booty Call"	Gary Halvorson	Story by : Chuck Lorre & Lee Aronsohn; Teleplay by : Don Foster & Susan Beavers	March 6, 2006	2T6516	17.06
Alan has trouble deciding if he should bring Kandi to Jake's birthday party to meet his mom, ex-wife, brother's housekeeper and the stalker (Rose). In the end, he brings Kandi after all. Meanwhile, Rose tries to get her new boyfriend, Gordon (J.D. Walsh), to act more like Charlie. Also, Jake takes Viagra (mistaking it as vitamins) with coffee and unknowingly stays in his bathroom after taking it. Title quotation from: Alan, fudging an explanation to Jake about what a booty call is.
65	17	"The Unfortunate Little Schnauzer"	Gary Halvorson	Story by : Chuck Lorre & Lee Aronsohn; Teleplay by : Mark Roberts & Eddie Gorodetsky	March 13, 2006	2T6517	17.37
Charlie's jingle is nominated for an advertising award, but he decides to boycott it because his arch nemesis (Jon Lovitz) always wins. The rest of his family tries to trick him into going, where his nemesis wins again, and even ends up sleeping with Evelyn. Rose is having relationship problems with Gordon and seeks help from Charlie. Title quotation from: Charlie, to Evelyn, when he says he won't go on a blind date with one of her real estate client's daughters.
66	18	"The Spit-Covered Cobbler"	Gary Halvorson	Story by : Eddie Gorodetsky & Mark Roberts; Teleplay by : Chuck Lorre & Lee Aronsohn	March 20, 2006	2T6518	16.72
Alan starts to have financial problems when he starts paying for Kandi's bills, so Charlie tries to get him to break up with her. Meanwhile, Judith is after Alan because he is late in paying his alimony check. Title quotation from: Charlie, to Jake, describing Alan and Judith by using a metaphor.
67	19	"Golly Moses, She's a Muffin"	Gary Halvorson	Story by : Chuck Lorre & Lee Aronsohn; Teleplay by : Mark Roberts & Eddie Gorodetsky	April 10, 2006	2T6519	14.05
Charlie is surprised to find out that Kandi has been living with them for the last three weeks. Alan is having a tough time helping Kandi earn a living. Charlie has lost his sense because of the dry-spell he is going through. Title quotation from: Berta, describing Kandi's physique.
68	20	"Always a Bridesmaid, Never a Burro"	Gary Halvorson	Story by : Lee Aronsohn & Chuck Lorre; Teleplay by : Susan Beavers & Don Foster	April 24, 2006	2T6520	14.47
Alan tries to win Kandi back. Meanwhile, Charlie starts to sleep with Kandi's mom, Mandi (Gail O'Grady), and Judith gets set up with Kandi's father, Andy (Kevin Sorbo), and Kandi moves with Judith. Eventually, Alan and Kandi reconcile in Judith's jacuzzi, where they end up with Judith and Andy. Title quotation from: Charlie, to Alan, about a show, while in bed with Mandi.
69	21	"And the Plot Moistens"	Jerry Zaks	Story by : Eddie Gorodetsky & Jim Patterson; Teleplay by : Chuck Lorre & Lee Aronsohn & Mark Roberts	May 1, 2006	2T6521	14.31
Jake's teacher, Francine (Julia Campbell), has a meeting with Alan and Judith to discuss the lack of interest Jake has at school. They all suggest that Jake should audition for a part in the upcoming school musical. Alan starts to spend time and bond with Francine, particularly over their love for theater plays, the board game Scrabble and overall intellectual conversations - something Alan doesn't receive from Kandi. Because of this, Francine offers Jake a lead in the school play. At the musical, Kandi accidentally lets slip to Francine that she and Alan are sleeping together, terminating Alan and Francine's relationship. Title quotation from: Charlie, after he makes an excuse on behalf of Alan.
70	22	"Just Once with Aunt Sophie"	Lee Aronsohn	Lee Aronsohn & Chuck Lorre	May 8, 2006	2T6524	14.87
A girl from Jake's school named Wendy-Cho invites him to his first boy-girl party. Jake is nervous at first, but Alan and Charlie convince him to go. They also take him out to get a new change of clothes and a haircut. Jake finds Charlie's advice more helpful than Alan's, and Alan becomes upset that Charlie never helped him when he was younger - especially when Charlie receives a call from Jake saying that the party "is going well". Alan is worried that Jake will turn out to be like Charlie, until Jake later expresses his idea to marry Wendy-Cho, which leaves Charlie to explain that Jake is actually just like Alan. Title quotation from: Alan, about the first (and only one) time he "copped a feel".
71	23	"Arguments for the Quickie"	James Widdoes	Story by : Susan Beavers & Don Foster; Teleplay by : Chuck Lorre & Lee Aronsohn	May 15, 2006	2T6522	11.04
Mia comes back to town with her dance troupe and invites Charlie to her performance. He decides not to go and tries to convince Alan that he no longer has feelings for her. He goes to see the performance after all and Mia explains that she wants to talk to him privately. She later reveals that she wants Charlie's sperm in case she would ever want a child. Charlie declines, but responds by asking Mia to marry him. Title quotation from: Charlie, before Mia explains that she wants Charlie's sperm.
72	24	"That Pistol-Packin' Hermaphrodite"	James Widdoes	Story by : Chuck Lorre & Lee Aronsohn; Teleplay by : Susan Beavers & Don Foster	May 22, 2006	2T6523	15.51
Charlie and Mia start making their wedding arrangements with the help of Alan. Things begin to fall apart when their two families meet each other at a meal and the meal becomes a disaster in a snap. Following a heated argument, Charlie and Mia eventually decide on a small ceremony in Las Vegas, but Charlie calls it off at the last second because Mia announces that she wants Alan to move out to make room for a nursery. Alan then spontaneously proposes to Kandi, and after she says yes, Alan announces that he will be moving out of Charlie's house anyway, causing Charlie to get drunk. Title quotation from: Charlie, describing Mia's police officer sister.
