= List of Two and a Half Men characters =

American television sitcom series, 2003–2015

The main cast of Two and a Half Men (season 2), from left to right: Melanie Lynskey as Rose, Conchata Ferrell as Berta, Charlie Sheen as Charlie Harper, Holland Taylor as Evelyn Harper, Angus T. Jones as Jake Harper, Jon Cryer as Alan Harper, and Marin Hinkle as Judith Harper-Melnick

The American sitcom Two and a Half Men, created by Chuck Lorre and Lee Aronsohn, premiered on CBS September 22, 2003. Lorre and Aronsohn are also its executive producers. The show initially centers on seven characters: the brothers Charlie and Alan Harper; Jake Harper (the son of Alan and Judith, his first ex-wife), Judith Harper-Melnick, Alan's first ex-wife, Jake and Milly's mother; Rose, one of Charlie's previous one-night stands who continuously stalks him; Evelyn Harper, Charlie and Alan's wealthy, five-time widowed, bisexual mother, and Jake's grandmother; and finally Berta, Charlie's sharp-tongued housekeeper, who later joins the main cast starting with season 2 after playing a major recurring role throughout the first season. In season 9, the show is revamped when Charlie is struck and killed by a moving train. Walden Schmidt replaces him as the new owner of the beach house. He is a recently divorced internet billionaire. In season eleven, Jake moves to Japan and leaves the series. To replace "the half-man", Charlie's long-lost-daughter moves into the beach house after looking for her late father.

Over time, several supporting characters have been promoted to starring roles: Berta (recurring in season 1, regular in seasons 2–12), Charlie and Alan's (and later Walden's) sharp-tongued housekeeper; Kandi (recurring in season 3, regular in season 4; guest in seasons 10 and 12), one of Charlie's former one-night stands and later on, Alan's second ex-wife; Chelsea (recurring in season 6, regular in season 7, guest in season 9), Charlie's second most notable love interest (after Rose), and ex-fiancée; Walden Schmidt (seasons 9–12), an internet billionaire who buys Charlie's beach house after his death; Jenny (seasons 11–12), Charlie's illegitimate daughter from a one-night stand twenty years before; finally, Louis (season 12), the 6-year-old boy that Walden decides to adopt. The show also features numerous supporting characters, each of whom plays a prominent role in a small group of episodes.

== Overview ==
Legend
= Main cast (credited)
= Recurring cast (actor appears in three or more episodes that season)
= Guest cast (actor appears in two or fewer episodes that season)

Character	Portrayed by	Seasons											
Character	Portrayed by	1	2	3	4	5	6	7	8	9	10	11	12
Lead characters
Charlie Harper	Charlie Sheen (Note: Kathy Bates appeared as Charlie Harper in a single episode in season 9, and an uncredited actor appeared as the same character in the last episode of the series.)	Main	Main	Main	Main	Main	Main	Main	Main	Guest			Stand-in
Alan Harper	Jon Cryer	Main	Main	Main	Main	Main	Main	Main	Main	Main	Main	Main	Main
Jake Harper	Angus T. Jones	Main	Main	Main	Main	Main	Main	Main	Main	Main	Main		Guest
Walden Schmidt	Ashton Kutcher									Main	Main	Main	Main
Main characters
Judith Harper-Melnick	Marin Hinkle	Main (Note: Hinkle only appears in one episode of season 10, 11, 12, although credited as a main cast member.)	Main	Main	Main	Main	Main	Main	Main	Main	Main	Main	Main
Rose	Melanie Lynskey	Main	Main	Recurring	Recurring	Recurring	Recurring	Guest	Rec.	Guest	Rec.	Guest	Rec.
Evelyn Harper	Holland Taylor	Main (Note: Taylor only appears in one episode of season 10, although credited as a main cast member.)	Main	Main	Main	Main	Main	Main	Main	Main	Main	Main	Main
Berta	Conchata Ferrell	Rec.	Main	Main	Main	Main	Main	Main	Main	Main	Main	Main	Main
Kandi Harper	April Bowlby			Rec.	Main						Guest		Guest
Chelsea Melini (Note: Bini Taylor also appeared as different guest characters in seasons 1, 2, and 5.)	Jennifer Bini Taylor						Rec.	Main		Guest			Guest
Jenny Harper	Amber Tamblyn											Main	Rec.
Louis Schmidt	Edan Alexander												Main

== Lead characters ==
=== Charlie Harper ===
Charles Francis "Charlie" Harper (Charlie Sheen, Seasons 1–8; Kathy Bates, Season 9) is the series' original central character. He is a womanizing bachelor who tends to abuse his younger brother Alan (whom he loves dearly, although he would never admit it) and usually takes pleasure in any misfortune or trouble he runs into. Charlie is a jingle writer and a children's music performer under the name Charlie Waffles. He spends his days partying, sleeping, gambling, drinking alcohol, womanizing, and wearing bowling shirts. He has had many serious romantic relationships. Some of these are with his stalker Rose, a ballerina and dance teacher named Mia, and Chelsea. He is the opposite of Alan: wealthy, confident, and charismatic. He gives his nephew Jake advice (much of which is age-inappropriate). But the two increasingly trade barbs as well.

Charlie is killed sometime between seasons 8 and 9 when he is hit by a train. It is revealed that he had proposed marriage to Rose before his death. While Alan is in the hospital, Charlie's ghost appears to him (it is implied that this is due to a hallucinogenic reaction caused by the medication Alan was on). He explains that his spirit now lives on in Hell, forced to live eternally in a woman's body (Kathy Bates) as punishment for his womanizing behavior during his lifetime. He acts as his brother's spirit guide, though he later confesses that he really could not care less about what he does. Before returning to the afterlife, Charlie tries to reveal himself to Jake but fails. As a result of retroactive continuity, the series finale reveals that Charlie never dies but is held captive by Rose in a basement pit under her house in Sherman Oaks. He escapes, collects $2.5 million in royalty money from his children's songs, and sends Alan, Evelyn and Walden (who Rose has told him about) texts and emails promising revenge while also sending large checks to his former romantic interests, Jenny, and Jake. However, as he is about to enter the beach house, a grand piano being transported to the house by helicopter falls on him. This kills him and, thus, ends the show.

=== Alan Harper ===
Dr. Alan Jerome Harper (Jon Cryer, Seasons 1–12), is Charlie Harper's younger brother by two years. He is well-meaning, but continuously makes poor choices and mistakes, while being bullied by Charlie, housekeeper Berta, and ex-wife Judith. Alan and Judith are Jake's parents. Alan is also possibly the biological father of Judith's second child, daughter Millie Melnick.

Alan moves in with Charlie after losing his house to Judith in their divorce settlement. He is generally a pleasant and supportive man, but he seems to have an attraction to women who treat him poorly. This may have stemmed from his relationship with his non-nurturing mother Evelyn. In the season 4 episode "Repeated Blows to His Unformed Head", it is revealed that Alan has a pregnancy fetish. He says this is due to Judith, varying from her sexless marriage policy only while being pregnant with Jake. Also, in the Season 6 episode "She'll Still Be Dead at Halftime", he confesses that he likes feet (see foot fetish).

In the season 3 finale, Alan marries 22-year-old dumbbell Kandi, one of Charlie's former girlfriends. After Charlie cancels his wedding with Mia, Alan and Kandi get married instead. However, in the season 4 premiere, four months into the marriage, Kandi throws Alan out of her condo and divorces him. This now leaves him paying alimony to two ex-wives.

In season 6, Alan starts his first serious relationship since his second divorce. Alan begins dating his receptionist, Melissa. The relationship gets serious when she has him move in with her and her mother, but their happiness is short-lived. Melissa walks in after her mother gets Alan high on brownies and seduces him. But Alan is too high to explain what happened. Melissa breaks up with him and kicks him out. In the season 6 finale, while Judith is giving birth to what is probably Alan's daughter, Alan and Melissa meet up and have sex in a closet, ultimately getting back together.

Their relationship goes into season 7, when Melissa wants to move into the beach house with Alan, Charlie, and Chelsea. At first, Alan is happy to live with Melissa. Eventually, Melissa and Chelsea take over the house, resulting in Alan and Charlie staying at a hotel. Alan and Charlie call Evelyn to fix everything. Evelyn tells Chelsea about Melissa's short-lived romance, resulting in the girls getting into a fight and Melissa moving out.

Alan and Melissa are now forced to have sex in their car, since she will not let Alan see her mother at her house and does not want to see Chelsea at Alan's house. Melissa tells Alan to get his own house. So, Alan steals keys to a house Evelyn is selling, and tells Melissa he owns it. When Alan and Melissa get caught at the property, they sneak out of a window. However, the cops find Alan in nothing but his briefs. When he tries to explain what happened, he turns to Melissa only to find she is gone.

Toward the end of season seven, Alan starts dating Lyndsey McElroy, the mother of Jake's friend Eldridge, and Judith's neighbor. Alan and Lyndsey date for the last three episodes of the seventh season, and their relationship goes into season 8. Lyndsey and Alan get serious, and she has him move in with her. After moving in, Alan goes to the liquor store, where he runs into his ex-girlfriend Melissa, and the two begin an affair. However, the affair is short-lived, and Alan decides to move on from Melissa, and continue his relationship with Lyndsey.

At Lyndsey's house, Alan smokes a pipe which Lyndsey finds sexy. She takes him upstairs to have sex. But Alan does not realize he has put the pipe down while it is still lit. This results in him burning down Lyndsey's house. She stays mad at him for most of the next episode. But when she finally forgives him, her ex-husband Chris steps in and makes up with her. This leaves Alan brokenhearted and alone again. Several episodes later, Lyndsey breaks up with her ex-husband when she realizes she has lost feelings for him. Alan and Lyndsey get back together and date for rest of the eighth season.

Walden Schmidt purchases the beach house and lets Alan temporarily stay after Alan helps him accept the end of his marriage to Bridget. Walden later insists that Alan stay with him permanently when Alan, with Bridget's help, saves him from Courtney (Jenny McCarthy), a femme fatale who previously had a relationship with Charlie and was out to get Walden's money. Alan and Walden became best friends after that. This friendship eventually earns Alan a position as a board member of Walden's company and his name on the deed of the beach house. Walden also renames his company "Walden Loves Alan Enterprises" in honor of his best friend. Alan continues his romance with Lyndsey during season 9, only for her to break up with him again after she finds out about all of his lies.

While Walden is dating Zoey, Zoey sees right through Alan and knows that he is sponging off Walden. Walden and Zoey go on a date one night and reluctantly take Alan with them. At dinner, Alan sees his ex-girlfriend, Lyndsey. The two reconcile at the end of the episode. Alan dates Lyndsey throughout the rest of season 9. He reveals to Jake that Lyndsey and he have no intention of getting married.

In season 10, Walden starts to grow tired of Alan living with him, but nevertheless allows him to sponge off of him for money. Alan and Lyndsey continue their relationship. But she starts to fantasize about other people when seeing Alan. In "Something My Gynecologist Said", Lyndsey asks Alan for a commitment since her gynecologist has asked her out. Alan is reluctant, resulting in Lyndsey breaking up with him again. That night, Alan goes over to Lyndsey's house and proposes to her. Alan tells her that as soon as he has enough money, he will put a deposit down on a ring.

Not too long after getting engaged, Alan gets an email from his second ex-wife Kandi, who's in town and wants to get coffee. Kandi tries getting back together with Alan. But he refuses due to his relationship with Lyndsey. Towards the end of season 10, Lyndsey breaks up with Alan after she concludes that all the spark in their relationship is gone.

In the final episode, Alan tries to take the $2.5 million in back royalties from Charlie and ends up fleeing from a very angry dungeon escapee (Charlie). He is back, as always, living at the beach house since Lyndsey doesn't appear to be marrying him. Lyndsey is seen getting a pawn shop evaluation of the ring received from Alan.

=== Jake Harper ===
Jacob David "Jake" Harper (born March 14, 1993) (Angus T. Jones; main in Seasons 1–10, guest in Season 12; E. G. Daily provided the singing voice for Jake in the opening and closing theme songs of seasons 1–8 and the first two episodes of season 9) is the dimwitted, slacker son of Alan and Judith. He spends most of his free time playing video games, watching movies and television, eating, playing the electric guitar, and sleeping. He is also an excellent player of card games, notably poker, and but is very naïve and absent-minded. This coupled with his flatulence problem is a frequent theme of jokes about him. Despite his apparent lack of intelligence, he is sometimes very observant—and good at blackmailing Charlie and sometimes Alan. He is friendly, laid-back, and clearly loves his father and uncle. However, he blames his parents' divorce on Alan for many years and is unafraid of rebelling against him, showing favoritism towards Charlie in such matters. But it is only after he enlists that he realizes that Judith had more to do with the divorce than he had originally thought. Jake's style, personality, and attitude changes as the series progresses—from a more cute, little-boy charm in the first season to a sardonic teenager in later seasons. After Charlie's death, Jake at first does not show any emotion. But it is later revealed that like Alan, he painfully misses him and still grieves his death (though not as bad as Alan). He proceeds to tell his father that the most important thing Charlie taught him was that when he is his uncle's age he wants to be married and have a family, because Charlie seemed very lonely and unhappy. Despite his young age, he has proven himself to be charming enough to get sex from older women (as evidenced in seasons 9 and 10). Jake and Eldridge decide to join the Army following their high school graduation. Jake forms a friendship with Walden, who buys the beach house. This has such an impact on his life that he tells Walden that he would name his child with his then girlfriend Tammy, Walden Harper. At the end of the tenth season he announces to the household that he is being shipped to Japan China for a year. He and Alan go on a father–son bonding trip together (one that he wants Walden to come on) before he leaves.

Though mentioned often, Jake is absent throughout all of season 11. He is also featured (via archive footage) in a montage paying tribute to him in the fifth episode of season 12. He is mentioned in Season 12, as his grandmother nearly forgets about him when meeting Charlie's daughter and she temporarily disowns him, as it was made clear that she did love him. Jenny also sought to meet him.

Angus T. Jones makes a cameo appearance reprising his role in the second half of the series finale in season 12, "Of Course He's Dead". Las Vegas Jake is passing through town and pays a visit to Alan and Walden. He informs them that he is no longer in the army, has married a Japanese dancer, and is the stepfather to her two children. He also mentions that he became wealthy thanks to his wife and his uncle Charlie (who is revealed to be still alive) sent him a check for $250,000 along with a note that simply states "I'm alive". After a brief updating, including breaking the fourth wall to address the studio audience, Jake bids Alan, Walden, and Berta goodbye as he leaves the beach house to return to his Japanese family. Both his entrance and exit are followed by a long studio applause.

=== Walden Schmidt ===
Walden Schmidt (Ashton Kutcher, Seasons 9–12) is a billionaire internet entrepreneur. He has recently been divorced and is suicidal when Alan first meets him. When Charlie supposedly dies and leaves the house to Alan, Alan puts the house on the market because he is unable to make payments on the three mortgages. Guest stars John Stamos, Jenna Elfman, and Thomas Gibson see the house but do not buy it. While Alan is speaking to Charlie's ashes and trying to decide where to spread them, Walden appears from nowhere on the back deck. This scares Alan and causes him to drop the ashes across the living room floor. Once inside, he reveals that he was trying to drown himself in the ocean, having been recently divorced from his wife Bridget (portrayed by Judy Greer). Alan and he bond at Pavlov's bar, where he tells Alan that he made his $1.3 billion fortune by selling his website to Microsoft. After picking up two women and bringing them back to the house, where he sleeps with them, he decides to buy the house.

Walden is presented as a pleasant and generally perceptive personality, in marked contrast to some of the other leading characters. Frequent references are made throughout the series to his good looks but his estranged wife describes him as shy and emotionally immature. So, with Alan's help, he returns to his mansion to confront his wife in the hope of reconciling. However, he is sent away after being treated for an electric shock that he receives while climbing the front gates of the mansion. Walden gets a second chance when Bridget later decides that she had been too harsh and that he deserves a chance to prove he is not as childish as he was. This chance is quickly ruined by a food fight between Walden and a little girl in the middle of Soup Plantation. Walden eventually invites Alan and Jake to continue living at the house they have been living in for 8 years with him as Walden wants someone around he can trust. They become best friends. Despite his frequent shyness, Walden walks around the house naked and is often barefoot. He drives a Fisker Karma and asks Evelyn to remodel the house using solar power and wind power.

Walden starts dating a British woman named Zoey (Sophie Winkleman), whom he met at the supermarket. Bridget later comes wanting Walden back but he declines her, wanting Zoey instead. She is later seen stalking him, where she runs into Rose, who says she can help make Walden suffer. Bridget reluctantly goes with her. Walden is introduced with a beard and long, greasy hair. But when he starts to get serious with Zoey, he decides to cut his hair and shave. Walden has also matured a great deal by spending time with Alan and dating Zoey. Though he still considers Alan his best friend, he eventually becomes aware that Alan is a freeloader and now understands what Charlie had to put up with. In season 10, Walden proposes to Zoey. But she turns him down and leaves him for another man. He starts dating Charlie's former stalker Rose. But Zoey tries to reconcile with Walden, telling him she made a mistake. When Walden tells Rose that they are going to have to break up, Rose at first acts like she is okay with it. But after leaving, she sends two ferrets to attack Walden; Rose then goes to Zoey's apartment wearing a pregnancy harness and tells Zoey that Walden got her pregnant. Zoey breaks up with Walden for good once more without letting him explain himself.

Later in the season, Walden takes the alias of Sam Wilson and pretends to be a regular, average guy so he can find someone who is not after his money. Walden meets Kate (Brooke D'Orsay) and tells her that he lives with the billionaire Alan Harper. Kate invites Walden to be her roommate, and they ultimately start dating. Walden keeps the lie going for several episodes until he wants to help Kate set up a fashion line of clothes she has designed. Walden puts US$100,000 in Alan's bank account so he can invest in Kate's business. After Kate goes to New York, Walden decides to confess who he really is. Walden meets Kate in New York and tells her the truth. Kate breaks up with Walden, but forgives him when she realizes he helped make her dream of being a fashion designer come true. Kate and Walden do not get back together due to Kate staying in New York. On Valentine's Day, Walden and Kate meet up and sleep together. When they realize they cannot get back together due to conflicting schedules, the couple agree to see other people.

Alan and Walden get married so that Walden can adopt a child and not live alone. The adoption goes through. So, Alan and Walden divorce, and Walden ends up dating their adoption social worker. After the scare from a threatening Charlie Harper, friends Alan and Walden continue to live together in Walden's beach house.

== Main characters ==
=== Jenny Harper ===
Jenny Harper (Amber Tamblyn, main in Season 11, recurring in season 12) is the long-lost, illegitimate daughter of Charlie Harper. An aspiring actress, Jenny first appears in the premiere episode of season 11. Here, she comes to Malibu hoping to reconnect with her dad, though Walden and her uncle Alan tell her he is dead.

It is later revealed that she is a lesbian. Some episodes of the eleventh season emphasize this to the point of comedically portraying Jenny as a stereotypical lesbian who is uninterested in serious relationships and is content to have sex with any woman she meets, to the extent that she is able to seduce (or "recruit") straight women (at one point, Walden claims that he did not know that one of Jenny's one-night-stands, who is his friend, was a lesbian. Jenny responds "Neither did she until last week", insinuating that the woman was straight but Jenny made her lesbian), among them Walden's own mother. A brief running gag is Walden and Alan trying to keep their dates from meeting Jenny for this reason. Later in the series, she abandons her promiscuous lifestyle and tries to find a steady lover.

After warming up to her, Walden and Alan invite her to move in after she reveals she has nowhere to go. Though she exhibits many of Charlie's personality traits (particularly his sarcasm, alcoholism, and womanizing), Jenny is considerably much nicer and down-to-earth than he was. Thus far, she has formed good relationships with her surviving relatives, Walden, Berta and Walden's friend Barry (Clark Duke). She and Jake have never met thus far. But she does know he exists and would like to meet him. In "Welcome Home, Jake", she meets Barry for the first time, mistaking him for Jake. She happily gives him a hug only to be disgusted when she discovers the truth. She eventually takes a liking to Barry, and the two become the best of friends. Though it is apparent that Walden is attracted to her, he believes she has no drive or ambition. Fearing she may turn into "another Alan", he tries to be a positive role model for her. Jenny considers Walden the greatest father figure she has ever had. She had moved from her home in New York City to find her dad in Malibu. She apparently has a poor relationship with her mother (like her father did), and the only reason she became an actress was "to piss her mother off," as she wanted her to become a doctor. In the twelfth season, Jenny uses her experience in the LGBT community to help Walden and Alan pose as a gay couple so that they can adopt Louis. She moves out of the beach house so Louis can stay in Jake's room. She makes a brief appearance in the final episode, where she receives a large check and an apology letter from Charlie, who survived his accident in Paris. She also appears to have gone back to her promiscuous ways, given that she is apparently having a threesome with two women and forgets they are in her bedroom.

Despite being introduced as the new "half man" in the eleventh season, she was replaced in that capacity by another character, Louis, for the twelfth and final season. Tamblyn's billing was also demoted to below Conchata Ferrell's because the role was now recurring rather than regular.

=== Louis Schmidt ===
Louis Schmidt (Edan Alexander, Season 12) is the child whom Walden and Alan foster. Louis and Alan bond almost instantly, whereas he and Walden initially do not. But they eventually find a common ground and form a strong father–son relationship. He also takes a liking to Berta and Evelyn as well. Louis' favorite snacks are Cheez-Its, cereal, and pancakes. He is officially adopted by Walden in the third-to-last episode. Notably, Louis is the only main character physically absent in the series finale, "Of Course He's Dead". This absence is not explained, although a picture of him is shown.

=== Berta ===
Berta (Conchata Ferrell, recurring in Season 1, regular in Seasons 2–12) is the family housekeeper. She is 63 years old in the first season and about 74 and a half in the last. Although she may be viewed as sarcastic, rude, and sometimes outright disrespectful, Alan and Charlie treat her with enormous respect, partly out of fear. It is also clear that the household cannot function properly without her. Berta has tried her best not to allow the overwhelming stress of her job to get to her head: When the very tidy Alan moves in, she quits. Charlie is so upset that Alan had to personally beg her to return, promising that Alan would do his own cleaning. However, the facts that Jake's bedroom could be confused with a dump (including at various times dead fish in the closet, food left-overs in his toy box, and nasal mucus under the bed), his toilet seat is frequently sprayed with urine, and his underwear is filthy often leads to anger on her part. Her favorite line after a mini-disaster occurs in the house is, "I ain't cleaning that up." Her role on screen was increased during the Kutcher years of the show. Season 11 was the first time she appeared in every episode of a season.

Berta has a sister named Daisy (Camryn Manheim), with whom she does not get along. She also has three daughters and several granddaughters, whom she admits are "sleazy and easy" and sometimes brings along to work. A notable example is her teenage granddaughter Prudence (Megan Fox). Berta has two ex-husbands: her first marriage lasted 15 years, and her second was a drunken Las Vegas escapade she refers to as "one hell of a weekend", which ended when she divorced him in Reno. She has served time in prison and worked as a prison barber. She uses, and makes references to, drugs (legal and otherwise). It is hinted that she has enjoyed many a joint during work hours and can produce a perfect one given the opportunity. She takes anxiolytics (especially Valium) in her coffee to reduce her violent tendencies. She was a groupie with the Grateful Dead and has implied that she had a lesbian experience during that time. It is hinted several times before Charlie's death that he has changed his will so she would inherit the beach house instead of Alan. However, that turns out to be untrue, although Berta is set to move out because the house has mortgages attached that Alan has no chance of paying.

Berta often calls Alan "Zippy". She and Alan are portrayed as the only people saddened over Charlie's death. She considers him to be the best boss she ever had. After Walden buys the house, he asks her to remain there as a live-in housekeeper. She agrees, mainly because she is extremely attracted to Walden and would often make discreet advances at him. This living arrangement is short-lived when she finds out that Alan will be moving back in, only this becomes more likely when Walden sees Berta invite a piggish houseguest over. She never thought she could work for anyone besides Charlie, but admits to Walden that he is instead the greatest boss she ever had, making Charlie second-best. Berta hardly shows any signs of attraction to Walden after season 9. Despite her displeasure of Jake's presence in the house when he originally moved in, she is far more friendly and welcoming to Louis when he moves in because he is cute and his background is similar to hers.

In 2014, Ferrell revealed that Berta was originally intended to be an ethnic minority, but producers liked the way Ferrell performed the role. She also revealed that Berta was intended to be only in a two-episode arc of the first season and was to leave due to Alan and his kid moving into the beach house, but producers extended the role and eventually made her a main cast member from season 2 onwards. In the final episode, Berta gets a large check from Charlie and seems to retire to Walden's beach house.

=== Evelyn Harper ===
Evelyn Pepper (previously Harper, Gorsky, Thomas, King, and Leopold; Holland Taylor, regular in seasons 1–9, recurring in seasons 10–12) is Charlie and Alan's mother and Jake and Jenny's grandmother. In the first season, she is 58 years old. Out of vanity, she changes the year of her birth as she ages. She expresses a superficial fondness for her sons and grandson. But she rarely lives up to her self-perceived notion of being a devoted and misunderstood matriarch. Her sons and grandson generally return the favor and go out of their way to avoid interacting with her on most occasions. Her wide-ranging sex life is a recurring gag throughout the series as she is attracted to both men and women. In addition to Teddy, who is not actually "Courtney's" father, Evelyn has been sexually involved with several parents of her sons' lovers and friends, including Rose's father, Gloria's mother, Gloria's presumed father, Gloria's likely biological father (i.e., the boys' father, Frank Harper), Walden's mother (with whom Charlie's daughter Jenny had already had sex), and Lyndsey's mother. She also bedded Charlie's ex-girlfriend Jill (who had become Bill) and Walden. Evelyn has been divorced once and widowed five times, her sixth marriage being the shortest as he died an hour after saying their vows.

The family frequently refers to her as "the devil" (or, as Charlie puts it, "unholy mother of us"). Charlie has her number on speed-dial in his cell phone as "666". Once, she showed up at the door in a black cloak while carrying a scythe. When Alan asked who it was, Charlie responded "It's Death," to which Alan replied, "Hi, mom!" It has been implied on one occasion that she is literally a witch who is dreaded and feared by other witches—one of Charlie's girls was a worshipper of the Devil and was scared away by Evelyn. Wealthy, with a luxurious house in Beverly Hills, she sells real estate in Beverly Hills and Malibu, having sold Charlie his house. Surprisingly, she is distraught over Charlie's death. However, at his funeral, she continuously mentions her intention to sell his house while Alan is giving his eulogy. Her relationship with Alan improves somewhat after Charlie's death, because she acknowledges that he is not just her second-born son, he is now the only son she has left, as well. When Alan almost dies from a heart attack, she fears for his life, because not only does she not want to lose another child, her "good son" is already deceased.

Two years after Charlie's death, she finally meets her long-lost granddaughter Jenny. Surprisingly, Evelyn embraces her newfound grandchild and temporarily forgets about Jake. She had previously expressed sadness by him going to the army and said she would have enjoyed a relationship with Jake, but "got to him" too late for proper bonding. She also makes Jenny heir to her estate, knowing if Alan had been the heir, he would've killed her for the inheritance. In the eleventh season, she marries for the seventh time, this time to her much older lover Marty Pepper.

She rarely appeared during season 9, but was prominent in the last few episodes of the season. Despite still being credited and billed as a main character, Evelyn made only one appearance in the tenth season and several appearances in the eleventh. In the final season, she shows up at Alan and Walden's wedding. This is followed by her sleeping with "Michael Bolton" and Walden's mother Robin. She then has sex with a fake Santa Claus. In the last episode, she appears when Alan needs Charlie's death certificate and when she gets a threatening message from Charlie.

=== Judith Harper-Melnick ===
Judith Harper-Melnick (Marin Hinkle; regular in seasons 1–9, guest in seasons 10–12) is Alan's cheating, vindictive, cold-hearted, self-absorbed, and humorless first wife. She seems to despise Alan and takes all chances to humiliate him. She is the first woman Alan has slept with and a video shows her dancing with erotic abandon at their wedding. But their marriage was cold: according to her, the only time she was happy being sexual was when she was pregnant with Jake. In the pilot, she lies to him about realizing she is homosexual as an excuse to end the marriage. In a subsequent episode, he catches her picking up multiple men. She makes no secret of living luxuriously with Alan's alimony, seeing she has not held a job since she divorced him. She later marries Dr. Herbert "Herb" Melnick (Ryan Stiles), Jake's pediatrician, a union that brings joy to Alan because it means he no longer has to pay alimony. Judith also considers Charlie to be a bad role model for Jake.

In season 6, she throws Herb out of the house and briefly reunites with Alan before reconciling with Herb. It is later revealed she is pregnant with a daughter, whom she eventually names Millie. Alan hopes he is the father. But Judith says she would kill him if he reveals that he slept with her. After she gives birth in the sixth-season finale, the child's parentage remains uncertain, because Judith was with both Herb and Alan around the time Millie was conceived. Jake and Berta describe Millie as looking nothing like Judith or Herb but more like a girl version of Alan, implying Alan is the probable biological father.

Judith makes very few appearances in seasons 7 and 9, but is featured in almost every episode in season 8. Unlike her relationship with Charlie—who she considered to be a misogynistic bad example for Jake—Judith gets along with Walden just fine—mostly due to her initial interest in him. She is not seen after the season 9 finale until towards the end of season 10, being mentioned only briefly for most of the season. Judith's absence is finally explained in the episode "Run, Steven Staven! Run!" when Herb mentions that Judith moved out when he cheated on her with his receptionist (yet in season 11, she is shown to still be living there). However, in the 19th episode of season 10, she reappears after a long absence when Herb starts to go crazy. Walden and Alan call her to go to Herb's hotel room and take him back.

She plays a major role in the season 11 episode "Cab Fare and a Bottle of Penicillin," when Alan shows up at her house just to talk about old times and they end up engaged after a night of drinking. However, in the end, Judith ends the engagement after Walden explains to her that Alan had proposed to Lindsey the same night he had proposed to her (however, he does not explain that she had not accepted Alan's proposal as she is now engaged to Larry). Angered by this, she kicks Alan in the groin. It is unknown if she and Herb have officially divorced or are just separated. In the final episode, Alan calls Judith thinking that Charlie is going to kill him. He tells her that she is his only true love. Having just received a generous check from their newly wealthy son Jake, she tells Alan she has another call and hangs up on him.

=== Rose ===
Rose (Melanie Lynskey; regular in seasons 1–2; recurring in seasons 3–6, 8–10 and 12; guest in seasons 7 and 11) is the Harpers' wealthy neighbor and Charlie's stalker. After his death, she finds new love and a stalker victim in Walden. The character has been described as a sociopath although she has a warm and friendly exterior.

Although she is somewhat mentally unhinged and obsessed with Charlie, Rose expresses that she "has an undergraduate degree from Princeton University (which she completed in two years) and a master's degree in behavioral psychology from Stanford University." Throughout the series, Rose applies her knowledge of interpersonal communication in the various situations that arise. Her family is involved in banking and oil, making them (and implicitly her) extremely wealthy. Martin Sheen, who is Charlie Sheen's real-life father, makes a guest-appearance on the show as Rose's equally-disturbed father, Harvey, who similarly obsessed over Evelyn after sleeping with her once. Rose's paternal grandparents were first cousins. Her grandmother attributes Rose's and Harvey's mental issues to this. Rose also has five ferrets, all named "Charlie," as had been revealed in Season 2's "The Salmon Under My Sweater."

She was one of Charlie's one-night stands. She would not allow him to forget about her as he does all his other sexual conquests. Rose acknowledges that she is "boundary challenged", while Charlie and Alan refer to her as Charlie's stalker. In the pilot, she tells Alan that she sneaks into Charlie's room while he is asleep and tries on his underwear. Usually uninvited, she enters and exits Charlie's house by climbing onto the backyard deck, rather than using the front door. She is caught by Charlie and Alan on several occasions watching them while sleeping. While credited among the main cast in CBS press releases in season 3–4, she was listed as a recurring star in on-screen credits. After season 4, she leaves for London and appears on the show only rarely. She later returns to Malibu in season 5, though no longer living next door to Charlie and therefore, appearing less frequently. She claims she was sent away from England after "an incident at Buckingham Palace". In Season 6, she becomes friends with Charlie's fiancée Chelsea and goes on a blind date with Alan. The two begin dating before Rose evinces the same jealousy and possessiveness toward Alan that she had applied toward Charlie, right down to gluing things to his genitals.

Her only appearance in season 7 is in "Gumby with a Pokey" when Charlie begins to hallucinate (after taking medicinal marijuana). Women in his past interrogate why he mistreated them. Then, he goes out to the deck to discover Rose. Unlike the other women, Rose is really there. She makes multiple appearances in season 8, after staging her wedding, which makes Charlie realize he probably loves her. In the last episode of season 8, Charlie leaves for Paris with her. In season 9, Rose reveals that she and Charlie got engaged in Paris. It is implied she may have had something to do with Charlie's death after she returned to their Paris hotel to find him showering with another woman. She reappears again at the end of "What a Lovely Landing Strip" catching Walden's ex-wife Bridget spying on Walden and his new girlfriend. She then tells her that she can help her make Walden suffer. She makes a brief cameo through archive footage in a flashback montage in the episode "Oh Look! Al-Qaeda!". She returns in Season 10's "That's Not What They Call It in Amsterdam", now dating Walden, much to Alan's dismay. The relationship gets serious but is short lived when Walden reconciles with Zoey. However, Rose gets revenge by telling Zoey that she is pregnant with Walden's baby. Walden ends up without Zoey or Rose. Rose continues to stalk Walden as well as the Harpers, despite Charlie's death. Rose returns in "Advantage: Fat, Flying Baby" at the end, where it is discovered that Rose is Walden's girlfriend's new investor for her fashion line.

In the series finale "Of Course He's Dead," it is revealed that Rose lied about Charlie's death. She married Charlie in Paris but soon caught him cheating with a French maid, a mime and a goat. Upon returning with the captive Charlie to Los Angeles she keeps him as a love slave imprisoned in her basement. After four years Charlie escapes using a rope made from his trademark bowling shirts. He subsequently uses the royalties from his children's songs to compensate some of the people he wronged, while sending threats to Evelyn, Alan, and Walden. Rose reveals the truth to them before departing the Malibu house to escape whatever vengeance Charlie has planned for her.

=== Kandi Harper ===
Kandi Harper (April Bowlby; recurring in season 3, main in season 4, guest in seasons 10 and 12) is Alan's second ex-wife. She was credited among the main cast during the fourth season. Initially she is Charlie's gorgeous but dim-witted (though sexually and theatrically smart) girlfriend until Charlie breaks it off with her so he could date Mia. When Judith (who later becomes Kandi's confidante) initially tries to end Kandi's relationship with Alan, Kandi's mother Mandi (Gail O'Grady), who also has a brief fling with Charlie during that time, makes sure the couple are dating again. During this time, Judith briefly dates Kandi's father Andi (Kevin Sorbo). This leads to an interesting joke Jake tells his father about the possibility Kandi could be his stepmother, stepsister, and stepcousin all at once. Kandi and Alan have a superficial relationship based mostly on sex. But they eventually wed in Las Vegas, where they also win half a million dollars. After only four months of marriage and spending nearly all of their winnings, Kandi kicks Alan out of their condominium. This is later revealed to be because Alan does not want to have another child with her. With Judith's help, Kandi acquires (and seduces) Judith's lawyer from her divorce and, despite only being married to him four months, manages to claim alimony payments from Alan, making him all the poorer and dependent on Charlie. Kandi is soon offered a role as a forensics expert on a CSI-type television series, entitled Stiffs. At the same time, Alan sees that Jake is practically grown up and returns to Kandi to agree to have a baby with her. However, moments before they try to conceive, Kandi finally signs the divorce papers to ensure that Alan will not have any claim on her new-found television lucre, and disappears from Alan's life. In the tenth season, Kandi resurfaces as a television star and tries to win Alan back. But despite his temptations, Alan ultimately rejects her as he is in a relationship with Lyndsey McElroy. After a paparazzo acquires altered photographs of them together, Kandi goes to explain the situation to Lyndsey, and for unknown reasons they end up having sex.

In the final episode, Kandi has become a celebrity and is seen being mobbed by photographers. Fearing the wrath of a very-alive Charlie, Alan telephones her to tell her she is the love of his life. She is the only one of Alan's lovers to be genuinely touched by his words, indicating that she may have been the only woman to actually love Alan.

Prior to playing Kandi, Bowlby had appeared as another character named Kimber.

=== Chelsea Melini ===
Chelsea Christine Melini (Jennifer Bini Taylor; recurring in season 6; regular in season 7, guest in seasons 9 and 12) is Charlie's girlfriend for most of season 6. She moves into his house by the season's end. Formerly a one-night stand, Chelsea seems to be one of the few women out of Charlie's countless relationships who has induced him to try to make positive changes in his degenerate lifestyle. She becomes close friends with Alan, something Charlie enjoys because Alan could take her to museums and foreign films (activities that Charlie cannot stand). In the seventh season premiere, Charlie finally decides to let go of Mia and commit to Chelsea. However, as the season progresses, Chelsea unintentionally begins to bring out Charlie's evil side, as he starts treating Alan and Jake cruelly if they accidentally inconvenience her. Eventually they plan to marry. But Chelsea postpones the wedding after she becomes attracted to Alan's lawyer Brad and Charlie vomits on a baby. This results in a rift, during which Charlie vents his anger on Alan by forcing him to sleep on the couch so he can sleep in Alan's room. Charlie and Chelsea make several attempts to reconcile, most recently following her breakup with Brad. Chelsea tries to reunite with Charlie, but is thwarted due to her best friend Gail (Tricia Helfer) sleeping with him. Jake later gives Chelsea a necklace that Charlie got her for her birthday and she goes outside to see him. But when she gets there, Charlie is in trouble with the police for rear ending a police car, with a suspended license. Jake is driving at the beginning of this episode. But when the police pursue them, Jake and Charlie switch seats, causing Charlie to lose his license. While being credited among the main cast as Jennifer Taylor during the seventh season, CBS press releases billed her as a recurring character. At Charlie's funeral, she announces that he gave her chlamydia. She appears in the finale with a huge check from Charlie and an apology letter for shooting her while they were dating.

Bini Taylor previously appeared in the pilot episode as a woman in the grocery store aisle complimenting Charlie and Jake, and again in season 2 as Tina, one of the women Charlie apologizes to as he tries to find out who set up the 'Charlie Harper Sucks' website.

== Recurring characters ==
Legend
= Recurring cast (actor appears in three or more episodes that season)
= Guest cast (actor appears in two or fewer episodes that season)

Character	Portrayed by	Seasons											
Character	Portrayed by	1	2	3	4	5	6	7	8	9	10	11	12
Dr. Linda Freeman	Jane Lynch	R		R	R	R	R	R	R	R		G	
Herb Melnick	Ryan Stiles		G		R	G	R	R	R	R	R		G
Mia	Emmanuelle Vaugier			R		G	G	G		G			G
Gordon	J. D. Walsh			R	G		R	R	R				
Teddy Leopold/ Nathan Krunk	Robert Wagner				R	R							
Courtney Leopold/ Sylvia Fishman	Jenny McCarthy					R			R	R			
Judge Linda Harris	Ming-Na Wen					R							
Melissa	Kelly Stables						R	R	R				
Celeste Burnett	Tinashe Kachingwe						R	R					
Lyndsey McElroy	Courtney Thorne-Smith							R	R	R	R	R	R
Eldridge McElroy	Graham Patrick Martin							R	R	R			
Marty Pepper	Carl Reiner							G	G			R	
Megan	Macey Cruthird								G	R			
Bridget Schmidt	Judy Greer									R	R		G
Zoey Hyde-Tottingham-Pierce	Sophie Winkleman									R	R		G
Ava Pierce	Talyan Wright									R	R		
Robin Schmidt	Mimi Rogers									R	R	G	G
Billy Stanhope	Patton Oswalt									R	R		
Kate	Brooke D'Orsay										R	R	
Michael Bolton	Himself										G		R
Brooke	Aly Michalka											R	
Larry Martin	D. B. Sweeney											R	G
Barry Foster	Clark Duke											R	G
Gretchen Martin	Kimberly Williams-Paisley											R	
Ms. McMartin	Maggie Lawson												R

=== Ava Pierce ===
Ava Pierce (Talyan Wright; seasons 9–10) portrays Zoey's young daughter from her marriage to Nigel. Well mannered and intelligent, Ava adores Walden, and is 108th in line to the throne. Ava invites Walden to her birthday during season 10, despite her mother having broken up with him.

=== Billy Stanhope ===
Billy Stanhope (Patton Oswalt, seasons 9–10), Walden's business partner and frenemy. Walden and Billy have a love-and-hate relationship. Even though they do not realize it, they are probably best friends. In season 9, after years of not speaking to each other, Walden and Billy start their business back up again and work together on a project they call the "electronic suitcase." In Billy's next appearance, he reveals that he has been seeing Walden's ex-wife, Bridget. Walden and Billy sell the electronic suitcase in season 10 for $1.2 billion. In mid-season 10, Bridget breaks up with Billy. This results in Walden, Alan, Billy, and Herb having a guys' night out, drinking and complaining about women. He is never seen or mentioned after this episode.

=== Bridget Schmidt ===
Bridget Schmidt (Judy Greer; seasons 9–10, season 12), the ex-wife of Walden Schmidt. She initiates the divorce proceedings because she feels Walden would never become a mature adult. But after the divorce is ready to be finalized, she decides she loves him anew and wants him back. Unfortunately, Walden decides to sign the divorce papers and continue his nascent relationship with Zoey. This causes Bridget to become violently unhinged and fall into the orbit of a returned-from-Paris Rose. This is later proven to be a one-off gag for that particular episode as Bridget later starts dating Walden's business partner Billy at the end of season 9. But she leaves him in "Run, Steven Staven! Run!". Bridget makes an appearance in the series finale "Of Course He's Dead." There, she talks to Walden on the phone while in bed with actor John Stamos, who had appeared earlier in "Nice to Meet You, Walden Schmidt" (Walden's debut episode).

In season 4, Greer portrays the role of Myra Melnick, the sister of Herb Melnick (Judith's fiancé/husband) in the episodes "Smooth as a Ken Doll" and "Aunt Myra Doesn't Pee a Lot." During this she has a brief swing with Charlie before she returns home to her fiancé, whose existence comes as a shock to Charlie.

=== Celeste Burnett ===
Celeste Burnett (Tinashe Kachingwe; seasons 6–7), Jake's ex-girlfriend, and main love interest of seasons 6 and 7. Jake first meets Celeste when her dad, Jerome, and she move in next door to Charlie. Jake and Celeste secretly date at first because her father is overprotective. But he eventually gives the couple his blessing. Celeste is shown to be controlling over Jake. But he does not seem to notice. In season 7, Celeste spends Christmas with her mother. So, Charlie convinces Jake to cheat on Celeste. Celeste stops by Charlie's house to give Jake his Christmas present. But when she sees that he is cheating on her, she breaks up with him. Jake tries to get Celeste back in the following episode, but has no luck.

=== Courtney Leopold/Sylvia Fishman ===
Courtney Leopold/Sylvia Fishman (Jenny McCarthy; seasons 5, 8–9), Charlie's girlfriend for a multi-episode thread. Charlie falls for "Courtney", whom he believes is the daughter of Evelyn's fiancé. He lends her a substantial amount of money and proposes shortly before they are to become step-siblings. She also forces Charlie to buy a car from her so that the secret of their relationship would not get out to Evelyn or her father. Charlie is heart-broken to learn that she is actually a con artist named Sylvia Fishman. But he retains feelings for her, telling her that he will "wait" for her (to get out of prison). She reappears in season 8's "Ow, Ow, Don't Stop" after being released from prison. Charlie immediately falls for her again, even professing his love for her. The two break up two episodes later in "Chocolate Diddlers or My Puppy's Dead" when they realize they have simply lost their feelings for one another. In an extremely rare case for Charlie, they part mutually and on good terms. In the episode "Nine Magic Fingers" of season 9, Courtney starts dating Walden. But their relationship is short-lived as Alan and Bridget successfully convince Walden that Courtney is a con artist.

=== Dr. Linda Freeman ===
Dr. Linda Freeman (Jane Lynch; seasons 1, 3–9, 11), initially as Jake's—then as Charlie's, and occasionally Alan's (and Walden's)—adept, incisive but money-hungry psychiatrist. Often when Charlie or Alan are just getting to the root of their problem, Dr. Freeman notes that the area is interesting, "but, unfortunately, we're out of time". She prides herself as a guesser and is quite sarcastic, especially with Charlie. A recurring gag is her frequent over-billing. Once she charges Charlie a full hour's fee ($200) for five minutes of consultation. On another occasion, while treating Alan for insomnia, she bills him for an entire hour after he slept for 40 minutes of the session, pointing out that she was awake. In one episode, she tells Charlie to open up and not hold anything back as her hourly fee comes to "$7 a minute". During her sessions with Jake, Dr. Freeman displays a rather quirky demeanor and is noted for her use of a cow hand puppet. She later has a session with Walden in season 9. It is implied that she (like her actress) is bisexual, as after Walden hugs her, she remarks "Hmph. Maybe I'm not gay."

=== Barry Foster ===
Barry Foster (Clark Duke; seasons 11–12), is the working partner of Walden's love interest at the time (Nicole). He is a full grown man. But he is often mistaken to be a kid due to his youthful looks, childish personality, and short stature. After Nicole leaves Malibu to work for Google in San Francisco, Barry is left homeless and without a job. He moves in with Walden temporarily, until Walden decides he's had enough of people moving into his house. So he finds Barry an apartment. Barry idolizes Walden to the point where it is borderline obsession. Nevertheless, Walden takes a liking to Barry, and the two become good friends. Despite having his own place, Barry tends to spend most of his time at the beach house hanging out with Jenny (the two become best friends of sorts and are seen as a sort of a double act—similar to Jake and Eldridge) or eating their food. Jenny, Alan, and Berta mistakes him for Jake upon meeting him for the first time. Barry's role gradually becomes more significant after his first appearance on the show. He makes only one appearance in season 12. He is there when the birth mother of Walden and Alan's supposed child goes into labor and stays to be there with them. He is never seen or mentioned again after this episode.

=== Eldridge McElroy ===
Eldridge McElroy (Graham Patrick Martin; seasons 7–9), Jake's best friend. His mother Lyndsey (Courtney Thorne-Smith) dates Alan. Eldridge is a very dim-witted drummer and somewhat of a troublemaker. In his first appearance at the end of season 7, he and Jake get into trouble after sneaking off to the beach with "a few" beers. Jake and Eldridge are often portrayed reinforcing one another's stupidity. They become chronic stoners by season 9. While Jake and Eldridge are friends, the relationship between their parents briefly causes some friction. But their friendship survives, and they decide to join the Army following their high school graduation. Eldridge is never seen or mentioned by name after season 10 (where Jake mentions (while talking to Alan) regarding them talking about Lyndsey and his relationship), though in season 12, a drunk Lyndsey does refer to both Alan and she having screwed-up kids.

=== Ms. McMartin ===
Ms. McMartin (Maggie Lawson; season 12), is the social worker who places Louis into Walden and Alan's care in the final season (when they get married) as it is simpler for a couple to adopt. Walden has an attraction to her, which he finds hard to hide to appear gay in order to successfully adopt. Eventually, Alan and Ms. McMartin have sex. But when Alan reunites with Lyndsey, Walden and Ms. McMartin sleep together. Though they initially decide to go their separate ways as they believe the romance was just in the heat of the moment and that they are not truly a thing, Walden decides he does not want to be alone forever and that he truly loves Ms. McMartin. He then goes to ask for another chance. She accepts after he serenades her with Michael Bolton. When Alan once asks Ms. McMartin what her first name is, her response is not shown to the audience. To show respect in Louis' presence, Alan and Walden continue to refer to her as Ms. McMartin (one of the show producers is named Susan McMartin).

=== Gordon ===
Gordon (J.D. Walsh; seasons 1–4, 6–8), a pizza delivery driver who idolizes Charlie. During the third season, he has a brief relationship with Rose. She forces him to dress like Charlie and yell the latter's name during sex. After their break-up, he disappears from the show. But he returns in season six, again delivering pizzas. He reveals how he had become a millionaire on the stock market, got married and subsequently divorced, and then lost all his money to his ex-wife, forcing him to return to pizza delivery. He looks up to Charlie, often calling him a genius and always addressing him as "Mr. Harper" rather than the more familiar "Charlie". Charlie invariably orders pizza from Gordon's pizzeria for him to deliver irrespective of the distance, including when subletting his own live-in girlfriend Chelsea's old apartment in the San Fernando Valley, and when camped out with Alan et al. in Lyndsey's burned-out house twenty miles from the beach. Gordon is unaware that Alan briefly dated Rose after his own relationship with her. Since he never appears after Season 8, it will remain unknown if he knows that Charlie has gone missing.

=== Herb Melnick ===
Dr. Herbert "Herb" Melnick (Ryan Stiles; season 2, 4–10, 12) portrays Judith's goofy, train-hobbyist, pediatrician second husband and Jake's stepfather. He first appears as Judith's date in season 2's "Enjoy Those Garlic Balls". But, due to an inconsistency in the storyline, he is initially referred to as "Greg Melnick." Not particularly happily married to the uptight Judith, he is laid-back and gets along with the Harper brothers. He appears to envy their lifestyles at times—such as Charlie's partying and the fact that Alan had been married to Kandi and later dates the neighborhood MILF (and former soft-core porn actress) Lyndsey McElroy. He finally achieves his dream of dating Lyndsey in the twelfth season. He and the other men in Judith's neighborhood similarly idolize Lyndsey's ex-husband Chris for repeatedly seducing the babysitter. He states that he likes spending time with the Harpers and calls Charlie "a little loosie-goosie with the liquor and the ladies, but all-in-all a good fella" (which does not impress Judith). In the season 6 finale, Judith gives birth to their daughter, whom they name Millie Melnick. However, Herb does not know that Judith had had a brief affair with Alan around the time Millie was conceived, and remains in the dark about the fact that Alan could possibly be Millie's biological father.

A widower prior to marrying Judith, Herb's hobbies center on gardening, his large model train layout, and "accidentally" bumping into Lyndsey every morning. Sexually, he is particularly adept at cunnilingus. In season 10, Herb has an affair with his receptionist and Judith leaves him. He keeps the house (Alan's former house). After she leaves him, Alan lives with him briefly after he and Walden have a fight. He tries to convince Alan to stay to avoid his loneliness without Judith. He begins to party out of control to get over Judith. So, Walden and Alan call Judith to try and calm him down (a rare moment of Alan and Judith working together). Herb and Judith then reluctantly get back together and Herb returns to normalcy.

Herb does not appear in season 11. In the episode "Cab Fare and a Bottle of Penicillin," it is implied that he and Judith have separated for a third time and have possibly divorced, as he is nowhere to be seen at Judith and his house. He returns in season 12 when Walden invites Barry, Larry, and he over to celebrate because Alan and he would be adopting a child. He is there with Walden and Alan when the birth mother goes into labor and decides to stay with them because he wants to be there to support them. Notably, Herb does not appear in the series finale, nor is there any further mention of his whereabouts.

=== Judge Linda Harris ===
Judge Linda Harris (Ming-Na Wen; season 5), Charlie's main love interest in the fifth season. Charlie and Linda meet through Alan, and his girlfriend Donna. Charlie and Linda's first date does not go as planned. But Charlie gets himself arrested to see Linda at court. Linda agrees to give Charlie another chance. Linda and Charlie start to get serious. But their relationship gets into trouble when Charlie starts to see Rose's face on every woman he comes across. Charlie flies to London to see Rose. But when he learns that Rose is ready to start a family, Charlie flees London and continues his relationship with Linda. Charlie learns that he is good with kids when he meets Linda's son, Brandon. Charlie makes Brandon a mix tape of kid's songs. When Linda's ex-husband hears them, he offers Charlie a job as a kids' singer. When Linda is awarded as "Judge of the Year," she takes Charlie to a function that celebrates her. Evelyn accidentally gives Charlie the wrong pill that instead of calming him down, makes him act crazy. After being humiliated at the function, Linda breaks up with Charlie.

=== Kate ===
Kate (Brooke D'Orsay; season 10–11), Walden's ex-girlfriend and main love interest in season 10. Walden decides he wants to come up with a new persona so he can meet a girl who is not after his money. Walden pretends to be the make-believe Sam Wilson. Walden and Kate meet at the department store where she works. Walden (as "Sam") and Kate go on a few dates, and Kate meets Alan, "Sam's" landlord, and she hates him. Kate tells Walden that he can move in with her, and he agrees. They also spend Christmas together. Walden has Alan invest in Kate's fashion line with Walden's money, and Kate goes to New York to host her fashion show. Walden feels depressed with Kate gone and gains a lot of weight. Alan helps Walden lose it, and they fly to New York so Walden can tell Kate who he is. Kate gets furious and breaks up with him. But later, she realizes that Walden helped her get her fashion show and so, forgives him. But they remain broken up since Kate has to stay in New York. Kate returns three episodes later, and Walden spends Valentine's Day with her. They are forced to break up due to their busy schedules. It is revealed to the audience that Rose is Kate's new fashion line investor (Walden and Alan are ignorant of Rose's involvement, and Kate is unaware of Rose's connection to them or of her psychosis). She returns in the season 11 episode "West Side Story" inviting Walden to her boutique opening. They then have dinner in the restaurant where they had had their first date, agreeing not to have sex afterwards. But they end up in bed, and right when they are about to have sex, they both get food poisoning from the fish they had eaten at the restaurant. In the following episode "Lan Mao Shi Zai Wuding Shang," Kate goes to San Francisco for a few days. Walden is planning to propose to her when she gets back. He then meets a woman named Vivian and falls for her. He tells Kate when she gets back, and they break up for good. She is never seen or mentioned after this episode.

=== Larry Martin ===
Larry Martin (D. B. Sweeney; seasons 11–12), is Lyndsey's boyfriend after Alan and she break up. However, Lyndsey begins cheating on Larry with Alan because he is apparently bad in bed. Alan thinks that Lyndsey and he will get back together. But Lyndsey says she likes all the qualities Larry has that Alan does not and therefore, wants the relationship with Alan to be only sexual. To find out more about Larry, Alan creates a pseudonym "Jeff Strongman". Larry and "Jeff" hit it off and eventually become best friends. Larry attends a gym and helps out with charities. But he is very naïve and later on, develops into an "idiot" character. He has a sister, Gretchen (Kimberly Williams-Paisley), whom he sets up with Jeff. He proposes to Lyndsey halfway through the season just as Alan is about to. Lyndsey says yes to Larry. He asks Jeff to be his best man, much to the chagrin of Lyndsey, who is irritated by Alan's close friendship with Larry. Larry seems to have no shame as he does not mind listening to Jeff and his sister having sex in the next room. It can be argued that he is the most important recurring character in the eleventh season, as the overarching storyline for the season revolves around his relationships with Alan and Lyndsey. When Alan reveals who he truly is to Larry, he initially struggles to understand. When the realization hits him, Larry cancels his wedding with Lyndsey. He attends Alan and Gretchen's wedding, making it clear that he blames Lyndsey not Alan. However, when Walden accidentally reveals to him that Alan was cheating with Lyndsey, Larry goes to confront Alan, only for Walden to push Larry off of the deck of the beach house. He returns in the season 12 episode "Thirty-Eight, Sixty-Two, Thirty-Eight." Surprisingly, he is still good friends with Alan and Walden. Walden calls Herb, Barry, and he over to celebrate the fact that Alan and he would be receiving a child. However, he believes and is confused by the fact that one of the two men would be having the baby. He is there with them when the birth mother goes into labor because he wants to, saying "to raise a child, it takes the Village People." He is never seen or mentioned after this episode.

=== Lyndsey McElroy ===
Lyndsey McElroy (Courtney Thorne-Smith; season 7–12), Alan's on-again/off-again girlfriend in the later seasons, the mother of Jake's best friend Eldridge (Graham Patrick Martin), and—to her extreme consternation—the daughter of Evelyn's lover Jean (Georgia Engel). Years ago, she was featured in a soft-core porn movie Cinnamon's Buns. She and Eldridge live in the San Fernando Valley, across the street from Judith, Herb, Jake, and Millie. She divorces her husband Chris after discovering his affair with their babysitter. Alan begins dating Lyndsey at the end of season 7. Their relationship is initially kept a secret from their sons. They have since had several breakups and reunions. In the season 9 episode "One False Move, Zimbabwe!", Alan says Lyndsey is dating someone else. This is confirmed later when he meets her very young (and rich, and handsome) boyfriend and is misled into thinking he could reunite with her. However, Lyndsey later breaks up with the boyfriend and tells Alan she wants to resume dating him. He is initially happy. But he is somewhat downcast when she explains that she had to work too hard to look sexy and cover up her bodily functions to keep the young guy and that she can forget about all that with Alan because he's not going to find anyone else. Alan later tells Jake that Lyndsey and he are dating but have absolutely no intention of getting married. They however get engaged in the season 10 episode "Something My Gynecologist Said". This does not deter Lyndsey from having sex with Alan's ex-wife Kandi when Kandi attempts to reconcile with Alan. Later, in season 10, Lyndsey breaks up with Alan again and begins dating a man named Nick. Nick is unseen, though Alan spies on him and Lyndsey, and hears them having loud sex. As season 11 begins, it is unknown what happens to Nick. But Lyndsey reveals she is dating another man who turns out to be Larry Martin. She still keeps Alan around only for sex, revealing that Larry is lousy in bed but that she likes all his other qualities. Larry eventually proposes to Lyndsey, and she accepts. But the wedding is cancelled when Larry learns of Alan's true identity and that Lyndsey had cheated. Lyndsey returns early in season 12 after 60 days in alcohol rehab, only to find out that Alan has married Walden. She immediately gets drunk and goes to Alan. She suggests that they resume their sex-only relationship. In the last few episodes, she is planning on moving away until she gets back together with Alan and accepts his marriage proposal after seeing the huge engagement ring that Walden had purchased for Alan to give her. In the final episode, Alan telephones Lyndsey to inform her that should anything happen to him, she is the love of his life (since he currently fears the wrath of a very-alive Charlie). Though she tells him she loves him, she is in a pawn shop selling Alan's engagement ring behind his back.

=== Megan ===
Megan (Macey Cruthird; seasons 8–9), Jake's math tutor and brief girlfriend. Jake develops a crush on Megan in season 8. But she does not reciprocate the feelings. In season 9, Megan falls for Walden. This makes Jake jealous. After realizing she has no chance with Walden, she settles for Jake, and they start dating. When Alan is sent to a mental hospital, he has a nightmare that Jake gets Megan pregnant. But in reality, Jake reveals that Megan and he never had sex but that he plans to that evening. It is assumed they break up as Jake has sex with an older woman in "Not In My Mouth!"

=== Melissa ===
Melissa (Kelly Stables; seasons 6–8), Alan's receptionist who briefly dates Charlie before starting a relationship with Alan. She breaks off the relationship after discovering Alan in bed with her mother (Alan is under the influence of marijuana provided by Melissa's mother). The two reconcile and begin dating again. But Alan's cheapness and lack of a private area for them to make love causes a second breakup. She reappears in Alan's life in the second episode of season 8 ("A Bottle of Wine and a Jackhammer"). This complicates Alan's relationship with Lyndsey. Alan and she has a bad breakup, and she violently forces Charlie to reveal Alan's location with Lyndsey. But she never shows up there, is not a factor in Alan and Lyndsey's breakup at the time, and is not seen ever after. She is mentioned in "A Giant Cat Holding a Churro" when Alan is sharing his secrets with Lyndsey, saying he "cheated on her with an old girlfriend."

=== Mia ===
Mia (Emmanuelle Vaugier; recurring in season 3, seasons 5–7, 9, 12), a ballet dancer/teacher with whom Charlie Harper falls in love during the third season. She gets him to clean up his act by not drinking or smoking as much, not wearing bowling shirts, as well as not eating meat. However, he breaks up with her after he becomes fed up with the way she is trying to control his behavior. She then takes a job in New York City. She returns toward the end of the third season when her dancing group comes to town. She asks Charlie for his sperm so she can have a baby. He attempts but fails. He then proposes marriage to her, to which she accepts. Initially, Alan is their wedding planner. However, after a big blowout with Mia's parents, they agree to go to Las Vegas and elope. Just as they are about to be married, Mia implies that Alan and Jake will be moving out after they wed, and Charlie refuses to throw out his family. They break off the engagement, and she leaves. Mia returns in the fifth season when Charlie sees that she is marrying another man. He attempts to win her back. But her father punches him out. She returns again in the sixth and seventh seasons after her divorce, hoping that Charlie will help her with a new-found singing career. She is a terrible singer. Charlie then has to choose between Mia and his then-fiancée Chelsea. After much consideration, Charlie chooses Chelsea and abandons Mia at the recording studio. Mia also makes a brief guest appearance in the ninth season première at Charlie's funeral. In the final episode, Mia gets a letter of apology from Charlie for having an affair with her sister, along with a large check. When she sees the amount, she says "Screw my sister," presumably forgiving him.

=== Robin Schmidt ===
Robin Schmidt (Mimi Rogers; season 9–12), the primatologist mother of Walden Schmidt. Robin is on the board of directors at Walden's company along with Walden, Bridget, and later Alan. Robin raised Walden from birth until he was four with a baby gorilla to study the differences in growth between humans and simians. Walden spends Christmas in season 9 with Robin. Robin is quite wealthy and has a good relationship with both Bridget and Zoey. Robin teams up with Bridget to get Walden kicked off the board of directors because she feels he is using money irresponsibly (she gives Alan a "happy ending" in the men's room of a bar to accomplish this). In season 11, she appears at a fundraiser with Lynda Carter. At the end of the episode, it is implied she had a threesome with Jenny and Lynda. A similar scenario occurs after her sons' wedding, where she has a threesome with Michael Bolton and Evelyn Harper.

=== Teddy Leopold/Nathan Krunk ===
Teddy Leopold/Nathan Krunk (Robert Wagner; seasons 4–5), Evelyn's fiancé, thought to be the father of Courtney. He is later revealed to be Courtney's partner in a con game, moments before he marries Evelyn. Teddy first appears in the season 4 finale. He maintains a recurring role halfway through season 5, where he and Evelyn become engaged and married. On their wedding day, right after being married, Teddy is found with his pants down, dead on Charlie's bed. It appears Courtney is not his daughter but his partner. Their real names are Nathan Krunk and Sylvia Fishman. Teddy is Evelyn's fifth deceased husband, although their marriage is not consummated before he widows her. His catchphrase is "terrific".

=== Zoey Hyde-Tottingham-Pierce ===
Zoey Hyde-Tottingham-Pierce (Sophie Winkleman; seasons 9–10, 12), the upper-class British girlfriend of Walden Schmidt up until the second episode of season 10. A graduate of Oxford and Harvard she is much more mature than Walden. She has an energetic daughter in kindergarten and is divorced. She is a lawyer and has a slight disdain toward Alan and the French. In the season 10 episode "Ferrets, Attack!", Zoey attempts to reconcile with Walden. But she finds out that Rose has moved her things into Walden's house without permission. Walden leaves Rose for Zoey. But Zoey no longer wants him as she is upset that Rose and he have become serious. She is not seen thereafter until the very end of the series and is only mentioned briefly twice. In the final episode, Walden calls Zoey and discovers she has married well and is being crowned Queen of Moldavia.

=== Marty Pepper ===
Marty Pepper (Carl Reiner; seasons 7–8, 11), Evelyn's much older boyfriend, a retired TV producer. Evelyn first invites him to Charlie's house when she goes to visit. He believes Alan and Charlie to be gay and Jake to be their adopted son, which he quips would make a great sitcom. This becomes the premise of season 12 of the show with Alan and Walden marrying to adopt a child. He gives the boys advice on how to score with women, telling them to say to a woman that he will give her, her own sitcom. He reappears in season 11 in multiple episodes. He meets Evelyn's newly found granddaughter. But he does not like her living with them when Walden throws her out of his house as she is receiving all of Evelyn's attention, leaving no time for sex between them. He initially mistakes Evelyn inviting Jenny to stay as a sexual reason as he had never done a grandmother/grandchild combination before. He believes Walden and Alan to be gay and ask the minister to marry them at Evelyn and his wedding. He puts Walden and Alan in charge of his stag party. But it ends in disaster, and he breaks off the engagement as he does not want to be tied down. However, he eventually resumes the marriage and becomes Evelyn's sixth husband with Walden and Alan as his best men. He believes Walden to be one of Evelyn's sons and prefers him over Alan, as most people do. Evelyn and he reportedly have an "open marriage", in that they can sleep with other people, as Evelyn does on at least two occasions following the wedding. In his original appearance ("Warning, It's Dirty"), the character is slightly different: he speaks with a slight lisp and out of one side of his mouth. These traits are dropped in his subsequent appearances.

== Minor ==
- Judy Greer as Myra Melnick (season 4), Herb's sister, and a brief love interest of Charlie. Myra stays with Judith and Herb before their wedding. But due to many conflicts between Myra and Judith, Charlie invites her to stay with them. Myra and Charlie end up sleeping together. At Judith and Herb's wedding, Myra breaks up with Charlie when she reveals that she has to go home to her fiancé.
- Kimberly Quinn as Donna (season 5), Alan's girlfriend for two episodes. Donna and Alan meet at a PTA meeting and become a couple. Donna sets Charlie up with his long-term girlfriend, Linda Harris (Ming-Na Wen). Alan breaks up with Donna after he feels like their relationship has lost its spark, only to learn that Donna had planned a threesome for the couple. Alan attempts to reconcile, but Donna kicks him out.
- Michael Clarke Duncan as Jerome (season 6), the Harpers' neighbor as of season 6. Jerome is a former football player and the father of Jake's ex-girlfriend Celeste. Jerome is overprotective of his daughter dating Jake, but eventually gives them his blessing. Jerome befriends Charlie and Alan, and even shows a soft side when he cries over his daughter growing up too fast. Jerome and Celeste's mother are divorced.
- Judd Nelson as Chris MacElroy (season 8), Lyndsey MacElroy's ex-husband, and the father of Eldridge. Chris cheats on Lyndsey with their son's babysitter and is referred by Herb to be a "legend" on the street. After Lyndsey's house burns down, Chris reconciles with her despite Lyndsey forgiving Alan. Several episodes later, Lyndsey breaks up with Chris and makes up with Alan. Alan starts to think Chris is out to get him. Chris and Alan make up, and Chris wishes Lyndsey and him the best.
- Missi Pyle (season 2, 7, 9 and 12) and Alicia Witt (season 6) as Miss Dolores Pasternak, Jake's school teacher who also dates Charlie. Somewhat eccentric she loses her teaching position after being dropped by Charlie. She is one of a number of Charlie's ex-girlfriends to disclose his sexual idiosyncrasies at his funeral. She is also one of several characters to receive generous payments from him in the final episode of the series.
- Matthew Marsden as Nigel Pierce (season 9), Zoey's ex-husband, the father of Ava. It is never revealed why Zoey and Nigel divorced. But Zoey is shown to despise him, and Nigel reciprocates the feelings. Nigel and Zoey have joint custody of Ava. Nigel and Walden meet on two occasions and do not get along.
- Georgia Engel as Jean (season 9), Lyndsey's bisexual mother, and Evelyn's newest love interest and roommate. Jean first appears when Alan and Lyndsey take their mothers out to dinner. That night, Evelyn and Jean sleep together and start a lesbian relationship. Evelyn has Jean move in with her in the following episode.
- Miley Cyrus as Missi (season 10), an old family friend of Walden's, who becomes Jake's new girlfriend for a brief time. They break up because Jake has fallen in love with her. She does not feel the same by the end of episode 7, season 10.
- Jaime Pressly as Tammy (season 10), Jake's ex-fiancée who is twice his age. Jake meets Tammy through her parole officer and ultimately starts dating. Tammy has three kids from three different men. For Christmas, Tammy has Jake dress up as all the three fathers. Tammy and Jake almost marries in Vegas. But they call off the wedding when Tammy tells Jake that getting married should be about bringing two families together, not breaking these up. Jake and Tammy continue to date until the end of the season when Jake cheats on Tammy with her eldest daughter, Ashley (Emily Osment). When Tammy sees how much Jake and Ashley want to be together, she gives them her blessing, only for Ashley's ex to return and propose to Ashley.
- Odette Annable as Nicole (season 11), Walden's love interest and business partner in her start-up high tech company.
- Jeff Probst as himself, Walden and Alan's neighbor (season 11)
- Michael Bolton as himself, a friend of Walden's. He is present when Walden proposes to Zoey, and later when he marries Alan. Both the times, he sings "When a Man Loves a Woman." But the second time, he changes the lyrics to "When a Man Loves Another Man" (seasons 10 and 12). After the ceremony, he has a ménage à trois with the grooms' mothers—Evelyn Harper and Robin Schmitt—to which he sings "When a Man Loves Two Women." He is also present when Walden attempts to reconcile with Ms. McMartin, singing "When a Man Loves His Social Worker," and after being told to leave and helping himself to the couple's dinner, singing "When a Man Loves a Cheese Sandwich." He also appears in a vision Walden has about his future, running off with Ms. McMartin while singing "When a Man Steals a Woman."
