= Two and a Half Men season 4 =

Two and a Half Men
- Season 4
- DVD cover art
- Showrunner: Lee Aronsohn
- Starring: Charlie Sheen; Jon Cryer; Angus T. Jones; Marin Hinkle; Conchata Ferrell; April Bowlby; Holland Taylor
- No. of episodes: 24

Release
- Original network: CBS
- Original release: September 18, 2006 – May 14, 2007

Season chronology
- ← Previous; Season 3 Next → Season 5

The fourth season of the American television sitcom Two and a Half Men aired on CBS from September 18, 2006 to May 14, 2007.

== Cast ==
=== Main ===
- Charlie Sheen as Charlie Harper
- Jon Cryer as Alan Harper
- Angus T. Jones as Jake Harper
- Marin Hinkle as Judith Harper-Melnick
- Conchata Ferrell as Berta
- April Bowlby as Kandi
- Holland Taylor as Evelyn Harper

=== Recurring ===
- Melanie Lynskey as Rose
- Ryan Stiles as Herb Melnick

=== Guest ===
- Steven Tyler as himself
- Katherine LaNasa as Lydia
- Sara Rue as Naomi
- Jane Lynch as Dr. Linda Freeman
- J.D. Walsh as Gordon
- Susan Sullivan as Dorothy
- Jessica Collins as Gloria
- Brooke Shields as Danielle Stewart
- Allison Janney as Beverly
- Brooke D'Orsay as Robin
- Morgan Fairchild as Donna
- Judy Greer as Myra Melnick
- Matt Roth as Greg
- Kay Panabaker as Sophie
- Joel Murray as Petey
- Andrea Savage as Lena
- Enrique Iglesias as Fernando
- Rachel Cannon as Chloe
- Robert Wagner as Teddy Leopold
- Mike Connors as Hugo

== Episodes ==
No. overall	No. in season	Title	Directed by	Written by	Original release date	Prod. code	U.S. viewers (millions)
73	1	"Working for Caligula"	Gary Halvorson	Lee Aronsohn & Chuck Lorre	September 18, 2006	2T7951	15.09
Clips show that, moments after Alan and Kandi wed, Alan won $500,000 on a slot machine. Four months later, Charlie has returned to his bachelor lifestyle after Alan moved out of the house. Alan returns to tell Charlie that Kandi has divorced him and taken all his money, and he suffered a breakdown, and now wants Charlie to take him in again. All this surprised no one, and everyone had bets on how long the marriage would last, which Judith won. Charlie resorts to desperate measures to help his brother: he calls in their mom to talk to Alan. Title quotation from: Berta, bemoaning having to clean up after Charlie's party.
74	2	"Who's Vod Kanockers?"	Gary Halvorson	Story by : Chuck Lorre & Lee Aronsohn; Teleplay by : Don Foster & Eddie Gorodetsky	September 25, 2006	2T7952	15.28
Charlie finally tells Alan that he didn't marry Mia because she wanted Alan and Jake to move out of the house, but Alan finds a hole in his logic. Charlie and Alan deal with a noisy neighbor who constantly sings all the time, who happens to be Steven Tyler. Note: For this episode, Charlie Sheen was nominated for the 2007 Primetime Emmy Award for Outstanding Lead Actor in a Comedy Series. Title quotation from: Jake, after Charlie mentions Evelyn's "vodka knockers". He actually asks "Who is this Vod Kanockers that you speak of?"
75	3	"The Sea is a Harsh Mistress"	Gary Halvorson	Story by : Chuck Lorre & Lee Aronsohn; Teleplay by : Eddie Gorodetsky & Mark Roberts	October 2, 2006	2T7953	15.80
Charlie tries to surf to impress Dottie, a beautiful woman he just met, but after he nearly drowns he is convinced that he saw a vision of his late father, who tells him something Charlie finds worrying and crazy: he must take care of his mother. Note: For this episode, Holland Taylor was nominated for the 2007 Primetime Emmy Award for Outstanding Supporting Actress in a Comedy Series. Title quotation from: Alan, trying to explain Charlie's near-drowning.
76	4	"A Pot Smoking Monkey"	Gary Halvorson	Story by : Bill Prady & Maria Espada Pearce; Teleplay by : Chuck Lorre & Lee Aronsohn & Susan Beavers	October 9, 2006	2T7954	16.38
Alan tries to hire his ex-wife's lawyer to help him win custody over the dog he and Kandi shared, but has to resort to desperate measures when Judith refers Kandi to the attorney she used when divorcing Alan. Title quotation from: Berta, describing what it's like watching Jake eat bananas.
77	5	"A Live Woman of Proven Fertility"	Gary Halvorson	Story by : Don Foster & Susan Beavers; Teleplay by : Chuck Lorre & Lee Aronsohn	October 16, 2006	2T7955	16.25
Alan is overjoyed by the prospect of Judith remarrying, as he would no longer have to pay alimony. Alan gets Charlie to help him when it looks like the marriage may be derailed due to Jake's dislike of his mother's fiancé, his doctor, Herb Melnick (Ryan Stiles). Title quotation from: Alan, to Herb, describing Judith.
78	6	"Apologies for the Frivolity"	Gary Halvorson	Story by : Chuck Lorre & Lee Aronsohn; Teleplay by : Don Foster & Mark Roberts	October 23, 2006	2T7956	15.03
Charlie is dating a new woman, Lydia (Katherine LaNasa); her attitude is exactly like his mother's. After introducing her to Berta, Alan and Jake, they can all see it, but Charlie still cannot; Lydia and Berta do not get on well with each other. Title quotation from: Bobby the waiter, after being scolded by Lydia.
79	7	"Repeated Blows to His Unformed Head"	Gary Halvorson	Story by : Chuck Lorre & Lee Aronsohn; Teleplay by : Eddie Gorodetsky & Jim Patterson	November 6, 2006	2T7957	14.48
Berta's daughter, Naomi (Sara Rue), is pregnant and Berta drags Charlie with her to a rough neighborhood where she confronts Ronald Wiedermeier (Andy Mackenzie), whom Naomi named as the baby's father, and persuades him to give her $5000. Alan reveals his pregnancy fetish when he gets to spend time with Naomi. After having the baby, Naomi reveals that Ronald isn't the father, but Berta still gives her $4000 "from Ronald". Note: For this episode, Jon Cryer was nominated for the 2007 Primetime Emmy Award for Outstanding Supporting Actor in a Comedy Series, while Conchata Ferrell was nominated for Outstanding Supporting Actress in a Comedy Series. Title quotation from: Charlie, to Alan, about why he believes Jake's grades are so low.
80	8	"Release the Dogs"	Gary Halvorson	Story by : Susan Beavers & Jim Patterson; Teleplay by : Chuck Lorre & Lee Aronsohn	November 13, 2006	2T7958	15.83
Alan suffers from insomnia. He visits Dr. Freeman, who reveals that the cause of Alan's sleepless nights is his jealousy towards Charlie, and his inability to glide through life. Charlie hooks up with the mother of a girl Jake likes after promising not to, and Jake gets revenge on him by sliming him, and getting him arrested when Charlie tries to chase him through the beach. This causes Alan's insomnia to be cured. Title quotation from: A police dispatcher on two different occasions—when Alan was taking a run along the shore, mistaking him for a crook and when Charlie was chasing Jake after he covered Charlie with green slime; also said by Alan, while watching the event.
81	9	"Corey's Been Dead for an Hour"	Gary Halvorson	Story by : Mark Roberts & Don Foster; Teleplay by : Lee Aronsohn & Chuck Lorre	November 20, 2006	2T7959	15.04
Charlie gets tired of Alan's mooching and reaches the breaking point during the brothers' double date; but it works out for the best (for Charlie, anyway) when he discovers Alan's secret $5,000 hoard of money; Jake is left home alone for the first time but a horror film means it's Rose to the rescue. Title quotation from: Jake, while watching a horror film while home alone and yelling at a character.
82	10	"Kissing Abe Lincoln"	Gary Halvorson	Story by : Eddie Gorodetsky & Mark Roberts; Teleplay by : Chuck Lorre & Lee Aronsohn	November 27, 2006	2T7960	15.50
Lydia's rude attitude towards Berta has them at odds and Charlie facing a dilemma: they give him a choice between each other. Meanwhile, Kandi does everything she can to stop Alan from selling their condo, seducing him every time he gets on the subject. Title quotation from: Charlie, about an oral sex inspired dream.
83	11	"Walnuts and Demerol"	Gary Halvorson	Story by : Lee Aronsohn & Chuck Lorre; Teleplay by : Susan Beavers & Jim Patterson	December 11, 2006	2T7961	15.69
Charlie's friends and family put a crimp in his plan for a romantic Christmas Eve date. Evelyn sees who the date is, she takes extreme measures to prevent them from having sex, but Charlie begins to have sex with her anyway—until he learns that she might be his sister. Alan has to mediate when Herb's interest in Kandi's breasts makes Judith angry. Also, Jake gets into egg nog, making him inebriated. Title quotation from: Alan, as he describes the Christmas cookies that Judith's drug-addicted mom used to make.
84	12	"Castrating Sheep in Montana"	James Widdoes	Story by : Chuck Lorre & Lee Aronsohn; Teleplay by : Mark Roberts & Eddie Gorodetsky	January 8, 2007	2T7962	14.78
Berta discovers that Alan has been dating her daughter Naomi, but welcomes him into the family, which would be great except Alan wants to stop dating Naomi, but doesn't want to break his new relationship with Berta. Also, Alan gets a piercing on 'the gay ear', which infects, causing him a problem. Title quotation from: Berta, explaining how she spent her summer.
85	13	"Don't Worry, Speed Racer"	Gary Halvorson	Story by : Mark Roberts & Susan Beavers; Teleplay by : Chuck Lorre & Lee Aronsohn	January 22, 2007	2T7963	15.85
Jake shares that he has heard his mother having sex with her fiancé, Herb (Ryan Stiles). This revelation brings up a repressed memory for Charlie, which leads him to seek help from Rose, and Alan having a very awkward conversation with Herb and Judith. Title quotation from: Charlie, to Alan, about when he walked in on Evelyn and her boyfriend when he was eight.
86	14	"That's Summer Sausage, Not Salami"	Gary Halvorson	Story by : Chuck Lorre & Lee Aronsohn; Teleplay by : Don Foster & Susan Beavers & Jim Patterson	February 5, 2007	2T7966	17.68
Charlie sets Alan up with their new neighbor, Danielle (Brooke Shields) in hopes a romance between the two will lead Alan to move out. Berta is cynical of Charlie's plans, but they later go off the rails when Charlie discovers that Danielle is a sex freak and a booze addict, and decides he wants to sleep with her instead. In the end, Danielle decides she wants to sleep with both Charlie AND Alan, shocking Alan and turning Charlie off. Title quotation from: Alan, as he describes some of a gift basket's items to Danielle.
87	15	"My Damn Stalker"	James Widdoes	Story by : Chuck Lorre & Lee Aronsohn; Teleplay by : Mark Roberts & Eddie Gorodetsky	February 12, 2007	2T7964	15.50
Rose is moving to London, and Charlie is surprised by his reaction to the news. He soon realizes he let the best woman in his life get away from him. Meanwhile, Alan's false online dating profile leads him to a woman (Allison Janney) with a lot of bad marriages in her past. Title quotation from: Charlie, as he races out to see Rose one last time.
88	16	"Young People Have Phlegm Too"	Andrew D. Weyman	Story by : Eddie Gorodetsky & Mark Roberts; Teleplay by : Chuck Lorre & Lee Aronsohn	February 19, 2007	2T7965	16.56
Charlie's young, hot girlfriend Robin (Brooke D'Orsay) takes him to a new club. She asks him to invite Alan to make up a double date with one of her friends, but the men are shocked to find that in the club they are considered "old". Later, a health scare has Charlie feeling depressed, so Alan takes him to a club where they are 'the young ones'. Title quotation from: Charlie, to Alan, after he coughs up phlegm.
89	17	"I Merely Slept with a Commie"	Gary Halvorson	Story by : Chuck Lorre & Lee Aronsohn; Teleplay by : Susan Beavers & Jim Patterson	February 26, 2007	2T7967	16.58
After Evelyn tells Alan and Charlie how she feels about there being no mourners at her friend's funeral, the boys share their feelings that this could also be the case at hers. Evelyn tries to prove them wrong by introducing them to a couple she helped adopt a boy from China and pushing them out of the picture, literally. Title quotation from: Evelyn, about the adoption of Changpu.
90	18	"It Never Rains in Hooterville"	Gary Halvorson	Story by : Lee Aronsohn & Chuck Lorre; Teleplay by : Don Foster & Mark Roberts	March 19, 2007	2T7968	11.68
Alan tries to bond with Jake when he realizes that his son's childhood is almost over, and takes him to go camping, which ends badly. Kandi pursues a career in acting and Alan supports her, but this could be derailed after Alan admits the desire to have another child. Title quotation from: Charlie, about Jake's bedroom posters.
91	19	"Smooth as a Ken Doll"	Gary Halvorson	Story by : Chuck Lorre & Lee Aronsohn; Teleplay by : Susan Beavers & Eddie Gorodetsky & Don Foster	April 9, 2007	2T7969	13.46
Alan is overjoyed at the prospect of giving Judith her last alimony check. Charlie decides to go along for the ride and meets Herb's sister Myra (Judy Greer). Charlie and Myra bond over a common problem: their great hatred for Judith. First appearance of: Judy Greer as Myra Melnick. She would later portray Bridget Schmidt, Walden's estranged wife in season 9. Title quotation from: Berta, explaining Alan's situation after he hangs up on Judith.
92	20	"Aunt Myra Doesn't Pee a Lot"	Jerry Zaks	Story by : Eddie Gorodetsky & Jim Patterson; Teleplay by : Lee Aronsohn & Chuck Lorre	April 16, 2007	2T7970	13.03
Judith's and Herb's wedding is taking place soon, and Alan is looking forward to it; Charlie and Herb's sister, Myra, continue their relationship, much to Alan and Judith's dismay; Alan meets a female at Judith's wedding, who is Herb's ex-fiancée and wants to have sex with Alan. When he tries to slow things down, she creates a scene by yelling voices of pretending to having sex with him. Also, Jake repeatedly gets his tuxedo dirty. Title quotation from: Jake, as he complains about Alan waking up four times to go to the toilet.
93	21	"Tucked, Taped and Gorgeous"	Jerry Zaks	Story by : Chuck Lorre & Lee Aronsohn; Teleplay by : Mark Roberts & Don Foster	April 23, 2007	2T7971	12.27
Alan and Charlie re-examine their sexual identities after Alan befriends Greg (a gay man, played by Matt Roth) from a support group that he has been going to, and everyone thinks he is dating Greg and "coming out of the closet". Meanwhile, Jake has a crush on Greg's daughter, but doesn't know how to appeal on his new love. Title quotation from: Charlie, when Alan mentions that a drunken Charlie had sex with "a dude in a dress".
94	22	"Mr. McGlue's Feedbag"	Jon Cryer	Story by : Lee Aronsohn & Chuck Lorre; Teleplay by : Jim Patterson & Don Foster	April 30, 2007	2T7972	13.71
Alan asks Charlie to help Jake with his book report so he can take the time to go to the DMV. Charlie agrees and then decides to take Jake down to the race track, where Jake wins $1,100. Alan is conned at the DMV, and so is Jake when he is swindled of all of his track winnings, thus learning an important lesson about money. Title quotation from: Charlie, to Alan, about a horse down at the track, claiming someone gave the horse crystal meth.
95	23	"Anteaters. They're Just Crazy-Lookin'"	Lee Aronsohn	Story by : Lee Aronsohn & Chuck Lorre; Teleplay by : Don Foster & Mark Roberts & Jim Patterson	May 7, 2007	2T7974	13.27
After the deck is damaged (Charlie sat on it and it fell off with him), Alan hires a handyman, Fernando (Enrique Iglesias). While working on the house, Fernando beats Charlie out for his girlfriend Chloe's affections, and also from Berta and Judith. Charlie fires Fernando, sleeps with Chloe in celebration, and falls off the deck again. Title quotation from: Jake, describing an animal that he feels is cooler than a squirrel.
96	24	"Prostitutes and Gelato"	Ted Wass	Story by : Susan Beavers & Eddie Gorodetsky; Teleplay by : Chuck Lorre & Lee Aronsohn	May 14, 2007	2T7973	10.16
Evelyn gets a new boyfriend, Teddy (Robert Wagner), who bonds with Alan and Charlie by taking them to Las Vegas. The boys confront their feelings about their mother dating and men coming in and out of their lives. They decide Teddy is awesome. First appearance of: Teddy Leopold Title quotation from: Alan, as he describes to Berta what Teddy bought for him and Charlie in Vegas.

== US Nielsen ratings ==
Order	Episode	Rating	Share	Rating/Share (18–49)	Viewers (millions)	Rank (night)
1	"Working for Caligula"	9.7	14	TBA	TBA	TBA
2	"Who's Vod Kanockers?"	10.0	15	TBA	TBA	TBA
3	"The Sea is a Harsh Mistress"	10.9	16	5.2/13	15.93	#1
4	"A Pot Smoking Monkey"	11.0	16	5.4/13	17.12	#1
5	"A Live Woman of Proven Fertility"	8.9	13	4.2/10	13.27	#2
6	"Apologies for the Frivolity"	10.5	15	4.7/11	15.06	#2
7	"Repeated Blows to His Unformed Head"	10.0	14	4.7/11	14.54	#1
8	"Release the Dogs"	TBA	TBA	4.9/12	15.95	#1
9	"Corey's Been Dead for an Hour"	TBA	TBA	4.7/11	15.28	#2
10	"Kissing Abe Lincoln"	TBA	TBA	4.8/11	15.59	#2
11	"Walnuts and Demerol"	TBA	TBA	5.2/13	15.77	#2
12	"Castrating Sheep in Montana"	TBA	TBA	4.7/11	14.81	#2
13	"Don't Worry, Speed Racer"	TBA	TBA	4.9/11	16.06	#3
14	"That's Summer Sausage, Not Salami"	TBA	TBA	5.8/13	17.77	#1
15	"My Damn Stalker"	TBA	TBA	4.9/11	15.62	#2
16	"Young People Have Phlegm Too"	TBA	TBA	5.3/12	16.58	#2
17	"I Merely Slept With a Commie"	10.5	16	5.5/13	16.70	TBA
18	"It Never Rains in Hooterville"	TBA	TBA	4.0/10	11.62	#4
19	"Smooth as a Ken Doll"	TBA	TBA	4.5/11	13.39	#2
20	"Aunt Myra Doesn't Pee a Lot"	TBA	TBA	4.4/11	12.98	TBA
21	"Tucked, Taped, and Gorgeous"	8.1	12	3.9/10	12.23	#3
22	"Mr. McGlue's Feedbag"	TBA	TBA	4.6/12	13.65	#3
23	"Anteaters. They're Just Crazy-Lookin'"	TBA	TBA	4.6/12	13.18	#3
24	"Prostitutes and Gelato"	6.3	10	3.7/10	10.12	TBA
