= Two and a Half Men season 2 =

Two and a Half Men
- Season 2
- DVD cover art
- Showrunner: Lee Aronsohn
- Starring: Charlie Sheen; Jon Cryer; Angus T. Jones; Marin Hinkle; Melanie Lynskey; Conchata Ferrell; Holland Taylor
- No. of episodes: 24

Release
- Original network: CBS
- Original release: September 20, 2004 – May 23, 2005

Season chronology
- ← Previous; Season 1 Next → Season 3

The second season of the American television sitcom Two and a Half Men aired on CBS from September 20, 2004 to May 23, 2005.

== Production ==
The show is produced by Chuck Lorre Productions and Warner Brothers Television. The executive producers in this season were Chuck Lorre and Lee Aronsohn. Gary Halvorson, Asaad Kelada, Pamela Fryman and J.D. Lobue were directors in this season; Lorre and Aronsohn were head writers. Other writers in this season were Susan Beavers, Don Foster, Eddie Gorodetsky, Mark Roberts and Jeff Abugov.

== Awards and nominations ==
This season was nominated for six Primetime Emmy Awards and won one Creative Arts Emmy Awards for Outstanding Multi-Camera Sound Mixing for a Series or Special. Conchata Ferrell and Holland Taylor received Emmy nominations for Outstanding Supporting Actress in a Comedy Series. Charlie Sheen was nominated for a Golden Globe Award for Best Performance by an Actor in a Television Series-Musical or Comedy. This season also won the BMI TV Music Awards for the show's theme song. It also won another music award, the ASCAP Film Award and Television Music Awards. It was also nominated for a GLAAD Media Award.

== Cast ==
=== Main ===
- Charlie Sheen as Charlie Harper
- Jon Cryer as Alan Harper
- Angus T. Jones as Jake Harper
- Marin Hinkle as Judith Harper
- Melanie Lynskey as Rose
- Conchata Ferrell as Berta
- Holland Taylor as Evelyn Harper

=== Guest ===
- Sean Penn as himself
- Elvis Costello as himself
- Harry Dean Stanton as himself
- Bobby Cooper as himself
- Ryan Stiles as Dr. Melnick
- Missi Pyle as Mrs. Pasternak
- Jeri Ryan as Sherri
- Camryn Manheim as Daisy
- Denise Richards as Lisa
- Jodi Lyn O'Keefe as Gail
- Jennifer Taylor as Tina
- Paget Brewster as Jamie Eckleberry
- Lucy Lawless as Pamela
- Chloe Webb as Trudy
- Orson Bean as Norman

== Episodes ==
No. overall	No. in season	Title	Directed by	Written by	Original release date	Prod. code	U.S. viewers (millions)
25	1	"Back Off, Mary Poppins"	Pamela Fryman	Story by : Chuck Lorre; Teleplay by : Lee Aronsohn & Susan Beavers	September 20, 2004	177653	16.44
Alan learns that Charlie belongs to an exclusive men's group, and he begs his brother to let him join. When Charlie doesn't, Alan tries to contact his old friends but discovers that Judith befriended them and turned almost all of them against him. Eventually, Charlie lets Alan into his group, but Alan begins to irritate everyone and ends up getting himself tied to a streetlamp. Guest stars Elvis Costello, Sean Penn, Bobby Cooper and Harry Dean Stanton as themselves, who are part of Charlie's exclusive group. Title quotation from: Sean Penn, to Elvis Costello, about Elvis saying Sean never speaks about his siblings.
26	2	"Enjoy Those Garlic Balls"	Pamela Fryman	Story by : Chuck Lorre & Lee Aronsohn; Teleplay by : Don Foster & Eddie Gorodetsky	September 27, 2004	177651	16.60
Judith is dating Jake's pediatrician, Greg (Ryan Stiles), and Alan is upset at the thought of Judith being with another man – until Charlie points out that if she remarries, his alimony payments will end, so Alan attempts to befriend him. While giving Greg a massage, Judith walks in on them, and Alan snaps Greg's neck accidentally in a panic – causing him to pay more money than he had to in the first place. Also, Evelyn visits Charlie and wonders why he seems to hate her. First appearance of: Greg Melnick (later renamed "Herb") Title quotation from: Charlie, in response to Judith telling the pediatrician to "not forget the garlic balls".
27	3	"A Bag Full of Jawea"	Pamela Fryman	Story by : Chuck Lorre & Lee Aronsohn; Teleplay by : Jeff Abugov & Mark Roberts	October 4, 2004	177652	16.43
When Jake gets in trouble at school for giving his teacher, Delores Pasternak (Missi Pyle), the finger, Charlie decides to woo her as an attempt of saving Jake from being suspended. Jake then catches the two in the middle of the night. When Alan finds out, he insists that Charlie break it off, but later insists that Charlie not because Jake has been getting great grades on his papers. Charlie breaks it off with Delores, anyway, due to the fact she wants a commitment, and she punishes Jake by giving him double the amount of his regular homework. Title quotation from: Alan, reading out Jake's answer to the question, "What is Sacajawea?" on his History test.
28	4	"Go Get Mommy's Bra"	Pamela Fryman	Story by : Lee Aronsohn & Don Foster; Teleplay by : Chuck Lorre & Eddie Gorodetsky	October 11, 2004	177654	17.15
Jake is very impressed with his mother's new boyfriend, Greg, after Greg teaches him various activities which annoys Alan. Meanwhile, Evelyn borrows Charlie's car to help her impress a Saudi prince she's trying to sell a house to and lends Charlie her electric car. Alan and Charlie then teach Jake how to drive in this car. Judith breaks up with Greg and Alan is there to support her; the two begin to have sex until Jake and Charlie walk in on them, but Jake doesn't believe Charlie when he explains that Alan and Judith were about to sleep together. Title quotation from: Evelyn, to Charlie, asking him to retrieve her $300 bra from his car in which she had sex.
29	5	"Bad News from the Clinic?"	Pamela Fryman	Story by : Chuck Lorre & Lee Aronsohn; Teleplay by : Mark Roberts & Jeff Abugov	October 18, 2004	177655	16.28
Charlie meets his match when he falls for a woman Sherri (played by Jeri Ryan) who's better at playing hard to get than he is. After repeatedly using him for sex, Charlie tries to get revenge on Sherri, but ends up punishing himself too. Meanwhile, Alan has a hard time teaching Jake to do his homework, and Jake is upset at the fact Charlie keeps eating all of his food. Title quotation from: Alan, making fun of Charlie.
30	6	"The Price of Healthy Gums is Eternal Vigilance"	Pamela Fryman	Story by : Chuck Lorre & Lee Aronsohn; Teleplay by : Mark Roberts & Eddie Gorodetsky	October 25, 2004	177656	17.25
While out at a family meal, Evelyn lets out a secret of Alan's past – he shop lifted when he was younger. Alan denies having shoplifted a toy as a child and fears he has a dark side, until Charlie admits he planted the toy on Alan to stay out of trouble himself. Alan finds it impossible to forgive Charlie until Evelyn asks Alan to move in with her because of Alan's dislike towards his brother. Later, Charlie reveals that in reality, Alan stopped wetting the bed when he was six while Charlie urinated on him while he was sleeping until he was eight. Title quotation from: Alan, after Charlie questions his habit of flossing after every meal.
31	7	"A Kosher Slaughterhouse Out in Fontana"	Pamela Fryman	Story by : Don Foster; Teleplay by : Chuck Lorre & Lee Aronsohn	November 8, 2004	177658	16.04
Charlie and Alan end up having to throw a party for Evelyn at the house. Berta hires her sister, Daisy (Camryn Manheim), to help out with the planning, but the two can't stop bickering. Eventually, Charlie has a talk with Daisy, and she agrees to help out. However, this backfires when the guests of the party focus on her singing rather than Evelyn. Evelyn then begins moaning at Alan and Charlie, as does Judith when she thinks they taught Jake to be sarcastic towards her. Title quotation from: Daisy, when asked where she met her husband.
32	8	"Frankenstein and the Horny Villagers"	Pamela Fryman	Story by : Don Foster & Jeff Abugov; Teleplay by : Chuck Lorre & Lee Aronsohn	November 15, 2004	177657	17.47
Alan meets a woman named Nancy at a grocery store, who fulfils every single one of his desires, forcing Charlie to take care of Jake. After only knowing Nancy for a few days Alan decides to ask her to marry him, prompting Charlie to try to talk him out of it, and he even gets help from the brothers' mother. Alan calls Nancy to propose to her, but she then tells him that her husband has returned from his vacation trip early—causing her relationship with Alan to terminate. Title quotation from: Rose, to Charlie, after seeing Alan chase Nancy around the house. (This was a deleted scene from the episode.)
33	9	"Yes, Monsignor"	Pamela Fryman	Story by : Chuck Lorre & Lee Aronsohn; Teleplay by : Jeff Abugov & Susan Beavers	November 22, 2004	177659	18.94
When Charlie leaves the house to avoid a date that he can't stand, he ends up at a coffee shop, where he reconnects with his old girlfriend Lisa (Denise Richards), now a divorcée with a child. Meanwhile, Alan walks in on Charlie's date in the shower and she frighteningly attacks him and Jake uses this situation to blackmail Alan; Jake tries numerous excuses to justify why he is getting bad grades. Title quotation from: Lisa, when Charlie asks her to act like a Catholic schoolgirl in bed.
34	10	"The Salmon Under My Sweater"	Pamela Fryman	Story by : Don Foster & Mark Roberts; Teleplay by : Chuck Lorre & Lee Aronsohn	November 29, 2004	177660	17.88
Charlie tries to get Jake's approval on a theme song that he is hired to write for a television show, which is based on a comic book of which Jake is a fan. But Jake doesn't like Charlie's idea and the two write a new song instead. Meanwhile, Alan and Rose begin to spend time together and eventually share a kiss; they later decide to remain just friends. Note: Oshikuru: Demon Samurai is again referenced in "The Gothowitz Deviation" episode of The Big Bang Theory. Title quotation from: Rose, telling Alan how she plans to sneak the hunk of salmon into the movies the two are going to.
35	11	"Last Chance to See Those Tattoos"	Pamela Fryman	Chuck Lorre & Lee Aronsohn	December 13, 2004	177661	16.22
After getting unusually turned down at a bar, Charlie learns from Jake that a website has been made dedicated to exposing his lifestyle. Charlie sets out to find who created the site, making amends to all those he stood up (including, amongst others, Jennifer Taylor), but the website is still standing. It isn't until Charlie apologises to Rose that the website is fully shut down. Meanwhile, Alan thinks that Judith wants to get back with him after hearing her talk to her mother on Jake's webcam. Title quotation from: Berta, when explaining to Alan that she has several tattoos.
36	12	"A Lungful of Alan"	Pamela Fryman	Story by : Chuck Lorre & Lee Aronsohn; Teleplay by : Mark Roberts & Eddie Gorodetsky	January 3, 2005	177662	18.03
Alan is jealous of Charlie when an old classmate, Jamie Eckelberry (Paget Brewster), who's now a beautiful woman, seems to be more interested in Charlie, before it is revealed that she hates him and worked hard to make herself a beautiful woman to rub his nose in it. She reveals that she used to be interested in Alan when they were younger, but shoots him down after he asks if they could try to go back to that now. Title quotation from: Charlie, when trying to prove to Jamie that Alan is a better man than he is, after Alan tells Charlie to talk him up.
37	13	"Zejdź z Moich Włosów (a.k.a. Get Off My Hair)"	Pamela Fryman	Story by : Susan Beavers & Eddie Gorodetsky; Teleplay by : Chuck Lorre & Lee Aronsohn	January 17, 2005	177663	18.14
Alan invites Judith to stay at Charlie's place after an earthquake severely damages the plumbing in her house. When Judith goes out on a date, Alan becomes extremely jealous and somehow ends up letting Judith throw him out of Charlie's house. Charlie then sets Alan up with a beautiful woman he knows, which makes Judith jealous and leave the house. Title quotation from: Charlie, attempting to tell Alan how to say "go faster" in Polish.
38	14	"Those Big Pink Things with Coconut"	Pamela Fryman	Story by : Chuck Lorre & Lee Aronsohn; Teleplay by : Don Foster & Jeff Abugov	January 31, 2005	177664	17.01
Alan and Charlie help Jake study for a History test which he passes. When Evelyn manages to make this into a bad thing and sucks the self-esteem out of Jake, Alan furiously throws her out and tells her she can't see her grandson. Later, Alan receives a call that Evelyn has been taken to hospital. He and Charlie realize that it's fake and pretend to go along with it by suggesting surgery. However, when she goes along with the ruse, it makes Charlie and Alan's efforts to expose her futile. The episode ends with Evelyn shown to be temporarily living with Charlie and Alan after the surgery. Title quotation from: A drunk Charlie, when saying to Jake what he likes to eat as a dessert.
39	15	"Smell the Umbrella Stand"	Pamela Fryman	Story by : Chuck Lorre & Lee Aronsohn; Teleplay by : Don Foster & Susan Beavers	February 7, 2005	177665	16.75
Alan starts to worry about a medical procedure that he is facing, and to get his mind off it Charlie suggests they go to Las Vegas. Berta overhears this and invites her friends over for a party. However, Jake becomes ill beforehand and then tells Judith everything on the phone. A furious Judith then comes over to scold the two, but Charlie and Alan decide to go anyway until Jake becomes ill again (causing Alan to realize he's going to face it sooner or later). Charlie and Alan then head downstairs after putting Jake to bed to find Berta hosting a party. Title quotation from: Alan, to Judith, after she disbelieves that Jake became ill.
40	16	"Can You Eat Human Flesh with Wooden Teeth?"	Pamela Fryman	Story by : Chuck Lorre & Lee Aronsohn; Teleplay by : Don Foster & Susan Beavers	February 14, 2005	177666	16.78
When Judith decides to take a vacation, Alan has to take care of Jake during the week. After a hard day at work, Alan forgets to pick Jake up from school, and then finds out that he has an important meeting at work the next day, meaning Charlie has to look after Jake. Charlie then forgets to pick Jake up from school as well. Title quotation from: Jake, as one of his questions to George Washington for his homework.
41	17	"Woo-Hoo, a Hernia Exam!"	Pamela Fryman	Story by : Mark Roberts & Susan Beavers; Teleplay by : Chuck Lorre & Lee Aronsohn	February 21, 2005	177667	17.50
After Charlie has back pain, he refuses to accept help from Alan, who decides to take him to the hospital, where he keeps hitting on his doctor (Alicia Coppola), unaware that he has dated her before. Meanwhile, Berta is fed up with Jake's inability to use the bathroom properly, and gives him a day of cleaning. Title quotation from: Charlie, at the doctor's after taking a shot of painkillers.
42	18	"It Was 'Mame,' Mom"	Pamela Fryman	Story by : Chuck Lorre & Lee Aronsohn; Teleplay by : Eddie Gorodetsky & Mark Roberts	March 7, 2005	177668	17.45
Charlie is invited to a party hosted by a gay ad-executive named Eric (David Starzyk), so Charlie asks Alan to pretend that he is his life partner. Charlie then meets Eric's gorgeous ex-wife (Lucy Lawless) who doesn't believe him when he claims he is straight. Charlie then returns home to find out that Eric had tried to hit on Alan. Title quotation from: Charlie, correcting his mother as to which play he dressed up as characters in as a child.
43	19	"A Low, Guttural Tongue-Flapping Noise"	Gary Halvorson	Story by : Mark Roberts & Eddie Gorodetsky; Teleplay by : Chuck Lorre & Lee Aronsohn	March 21, 2005	177669	15.92
After Charlie injures Alan by throwing toast at him, he takes Alan to an eye doctor; they later end up at the coffee shop where they bump into Charlie's ex-girlfriend, Sherri (previously seen in "Bad News from the Clinic"). While there Alan shows an interest in Sherri, and decides to ask her out. The problem is that Alan can't get over Sherri's relationship with Charlie, causing her to angrily break up with him. Title quotation from: The sound that Alan uses to name "the planet" that Sherri is from immediately after he says to Charlie, "She's just like a regular person, except for, you know, being from the planet".
44	20	"I Always Wanted a Shaved Monkey"	Asaad Kelada	Story by : Susan Beavers & Jeff Abugov; Teleplay by : Chuck Lorre & Lee Aronsohn	April 18, 2005	177673	17.13
When Evelyn rings the house phone and Charlie answers, Evelyn quickly winds him up. Meanwhile, Alan answers the door to Judith, who winds him up by presenting him with a bill for spending on Jake. Alan and Charlie then take their irritation out on each other. The next day, they reconcile, until Charlie finds out that Berta disposed of some of his expensive clothes he'd left out for dry cleaning. Rose steps in to resolve their issues, using her Psychology degree knowledge, and they spend the afternoon discussing Charlie and Alan's problems with each other since childhood. Title quotation from: Charlie, when explaining to Rose why he told all of his friends that Alan was a shaved monkey.
45	21	"A Sympathetic Crotch to Cry On"	Pamela Fryman	Story by : Chuck Lorre & Lee Aronsohn; Teleplay by : Mark Roberts & Eddie Gorodetsky	May 2, 2005	177671	17.93
Evelyn reads in the obituaries that her second husband, Harry, has died. They all attend the funeral, including Jake who is excited at the opportunity of seeing a "dead guy." Charlie is excited by the opportunity of a newly single widow, and Alan is just happy to pay his respects to Harry. Evelyn tells her sons a secret: her husband had cheated on her, and she still loved him; it turns out that her husband then cheated on the girl with whom he cheated on Evelyn. Title quotation from: Alan, accusing Charlie of hitting on the widow at the funeral.
46	22	"That Old Hose Bag is My Mother"	Gary Halvorson	Story by : Chuck Lorre & Lee Aronsohn; Teleplay by : Mark Roberts & Don Foster	May 9, 2005	177670	17.96
Alan gets a new sports car which everyone claims is a woman's car. When asked where he got the money, Alan claims he "found it," until finally telling Charlie that his mother lent him the money. Charlie warns that she'll want pay back, and sure enough she asks Alan to go on a double-date with her. She then doesn't show up, leaving Alan with his recovering alcoholic date, Trudy (Chloe Webb). After she passes out, he takes her home and leaves her in his car, but accidentally leaves the keys in the car and the garage door open. Trudy is then seen on the news driving his car down a freeway at high speed. Title quotation from: Alan, to Trudy, correcting her when she says that her father is doing "some old hose bag".
47	23	"Squab, Squab, Squab, Squab, Squab"	J.D. Lobue	Story by : Chuck Lorre & Lee Aronsohn; Teleplay by : Susan Beavers & Don Foster	May 16, 2005	177674	24.24
Evelyn demands Jake spend a night at her place when she finds out he spent Spring Break with Judith's parents. Neither Alan nor Charlie are keen on the idea, but going to a bar after dropping off Jake quickly erases their concerns when a group of attractive women show up. Evelyn tries to get Jake to eat sushi and squab, which Jake doesn't like. She then makes him spaghetti, which she throws over him after he scares her, making her jump. Jake then takes a bath but leaves the tap on, causing the ceiling to break and the wave of water to come crashing down on Evelyn. Alan and Charlie then decide that Jake is "the chosen one" because he "broke her" (Evelyn), something Alan and Charlie, according to themselves, never managed. Title quotation from: Jake, experimenting in different voices the name of the food Evelyn offers him.
48	24	"Does This Smell Funny to You?"	Pamela Fryman	Story by : Chuck Lorre & Lee Aronsohn; Teleplay by : Susan Beavers & Jeff Abugov	May 23, 2005	177672	14.37
Jake has to read a report of his weekend to his class. In the report, it is revealed that Charlie slept with an older man's (Norman) wife, who then came to the house to seek revenge on Charlie. Charlie and Norman eventually talk things out, and Norman becomes attracted to Evelyn when she shows up. Evelyn tells Berta, Alan, Charlie and Jake to go and see a movie. When they return, they walk in on Evelyn and Norman having sex. Meanwhile, Jake is oblivious to everything around him (even Norman's wife sneaking out of the house) because he has lost his Game Boy and can't find it. He eventually finds it when taking a pee in the plants. Orson Bean guest stars as Norman, the older man whose wife had slept with Charlie. Title quotation from: Jake, when asking Alan if his Game Boy smells funny. (It is implied that it is because Jake peed on it.)

== Ratings ==
This season was the highest rated season of Two and a Half Men, with an estimate viewership of 16.5 million. Also, the episode "Squab, Squab, Squab, Squab, Squab", received the show's second highest viewership with 24.2 million viewership, only surpassed by the ninth season's premiere, "Nice to Meet You, Walden Schmidt" with 28.74 million.
