= J. D. Walsh (actor) =

American screen actor, writer and producer (born 1974)

- Born: John Douglas Walsh; December 24, 1974 (age 51); Madison, Wisconsin, US
- Occupations: Actor; writer; producer
- Years active: 1997–present

John Douglas Walsh (born December 24, 1974) is an American actor, writer, producer, and improv comedy leader. He is best known for his role as Gordon on Two and a Half Men. He wrote, produced and directed the show Battleground.

== Early life ==
Walsh was born and raised as an only child in Madison, Wisconsin. His mother was a professor at the University of Wisconsin–Madison.

After graduating from Madison West High School, Walsh briefly attended the University of Minnesota before transferring to the University of California, Santa Barbara. It was there that he got involved with Theatresports. He would later transfer to and graduate from UCLA with a Bachelor of Arts in theater.

After graduating, Walsh founded Ultimate Improv with Matt Jones, an improvisational comedy club located in Westwood, Los Angeles, California. In September 2008, he and his troupe made a video spoof of Les Misérables' "One Day More" called "Les Misbarack", which became a hit on YouTube. The theater later closed due to lack of audience.

== Career ==
Walsh's roles have included parts in various TV shows and films, as actor, as writer, and co-executive producer, his most notable being "Mackey Nagle" on Smart Guy and as Gordon on Two and a Half Men. Walsh appeared in the 2014 film, The Amazing Spider-Man 2 as an online instructor demonstrating how batteries work.

His show Battleground aired on Hulu in 2012.

== Filmography ==
=== Film ===
Year	Title	Role	Notes
1997	Safety Smart	Jerry	
1997	St. Patrick's Day	Michael John	
2002	Love Liza	Bern	
2003	Bad Boys II	Sales Tech	
2006	Bickford Shmeckler's Cool Ideas	Fred	
2009	The Slammin' Salmon	Cod Customer #3	
2013	Life of a King	Fritz	
2014	The Amazing Spider-Man 2	Dr. Jallings, Science Investigator	

=== Television ===
Year	Title	Role	Notes
1997–1999	Smart Guy	Mackey Nagle	19 episodes
1998–2002	Dharma & Greg	Donald	5 episodes
2003	The Lyon's Den	Max Vargus	Episode: "Privileged"
2003	Tremors	Larry Norvel	5 episodes
2004	Two and a Half Men	Ted	Episode: "I Can't Afford Hyenas"
2004	Without a Trace	Paul	Episode: "American Goddess"
2005	The Suite Life of Zack & Cody	Nick	Episode: "To Catch a Thief"
2006–2011	Two and a Half Men	Gordon	8 episodes
2007	Studio 60 on the Sunset Strip	Doctor	4 episodes
2008	CSI: Crime Scene Investigation	Eddie	Episode: "Two and a Half Deaths"
2009	The League	JD	Episode: "Sunday at Ruxin's"
2010	iCarly	Gordon Birch	Episode: "iDo"
2011	Criminal Minds: Suspect Behavior	Kelvin Cornwell	Episode: "The Girl in the Blue Mask"
2011	The Mentalist	Nate Glass	Episode: "Pretty Red Balloon"
2013	Bones	Dr. Fred Dumaski	Episode: "The Doom in the Gloom"
2013	Franklin & Bash	Alan Slaten	Episode: "Shoot to Thrill"
2013–2014	The Crazy Ones	Randall	2 episodes
2014	Rizzoli & Isles	Larry Rothsburgher	Episode: "The Best Laid Plans"
2015	It's Always Sunny in Philadelphia	Doctor	Episode: "Frank Retires"
2016	Castle	John Emerson	Episode: ;"And Justice for All"
2017	Daytime Divas	Gary	Episode: "Truth's a Mutha"
2018	9-1-1	Officer Gerrard	Episode: "Worst Day Ever"
2018	NCIS	Leonard Finnik	Episode: "Boom"
2020	The Rookie	Mr. Dugan	Episode: "Control"
2020	Chris & Jack	Washington, D.C. Scientist	Episode: "Aliens Have Finally Responded"
2021	The Kominsky Method	Judd Melman	2 episodes
2022	Animal Kingdom	Father Kirby	3 episodes
2023	All Rise	Moe Wardlow	Episode: "Trouble Woman"
2024	Read the Room	HR Manager	Episode: "Breaking Up"
2024	Young Sheldon	Reverend Travis Lemon	Episode: "A Frankenstein's Monster and a Crazy Church Guy"
2024	Hacks	Steve	Episode: "Better Late"
2024	Tulsa King	Harlan Thibodeaux	2 episodes
2024	Georgie & Mandy's First Marriage	Reverend Travis Lemon	Episode: "A Regular Samaritan"
