= Diary of a Young Comic =

- Written by: Richard Lewis; Bennett Tramer
- Directed by: Gary Weis
- Starring: Richard Lewis; Dom DeLuise; George Jessel
- Country of origin: United States
- Original language: English

Production
- Cinematography: Erik Daarstad
- Running time: 90 minutes

Original release
- Network: NBC
- Release: February 3, 1979

Diary of a Young Comic is a 1979 made-for-television comedy film starring Richard Lewis, Dom DeLuise and George Jessel and directed by Gary Weis.

The film is a satirical take on Hollywood and follows the story of a young stand-up comic who moves to Los Angeles trying to make it big.

== Plot ==
Billy Gondolstein (Richard Lewis) is a young Jewish stand-up comic from New York City who decides to change his surname to Gondola and try his luck on the Los Angeles comedy scene, much to his family's dismay.

In Los Angeles, Billy reconnects with his cousin, Shirley Gondolstein, also from New York. She advises Billy that she now goes by the name "Shi" and that "Essence is all that matters to me anymore." Shi lives in a bare apartment and, while Billy is visiting, her boyfriend Fred (now known as "Fre") shows-up to dump some straw on the floor. Shi tells Billy that the straw is "a queen-sized bed."

Billy soon finds that everyone he meets is either obsessed with celebrity or is an out-of-work performer working a part-time job: His landlord, Mr. Porzinski (Stacy Keach) also works as a stunt man and Billy takes a cab and finds out that his driver is also a composer. One of Billy's neighbors (Linda Kerridge) is the spitting image of Marilyn Monroe. Billy visits a psychotherapist (Richard Dimitri) whose office walls are covered with the pictures of the celebrities he has treated, with their eyes covered with strips of black tape to supposedly protect their identities. On his way out of the therapist's office, Billy remarks "Say, isn't that Flipper?"

Dom DeLuise, George Jessel, Gary Mule Deer, Nina van Pallandt and Loudon Wainwright III all make cameo appearances in the film as themselves.

== Cast ==
- Richard Lewis as Billy Gondola (formerly Billy Gondolstein), an unknown standup comedian who is struggling in his career and moves from New York to LA.
- Michael Lerner as Norman Greenleaf, Billy's agent
- Linda Kerridge as Linda, Billy's neighbor he dates who is a Marilyn Monroe impersonator
- Bill Macy as Herbert Gondolstein, Billy's father
- Bunny Summers as Bertha Gondolstein, Billy's mother
- Stacy Keach as Mr. Porzinski, Billy's landlord who is also an aspiring stuntman
- Richard Dimitri as Dr. Alexander Biff Mendez, Billy's therapist
- Tim Thomerson as Lucifer, a leather jacket-clad, chain-smoking biker who Billy meets at a diner. They realize they went to neighboring high schools.
- Richard Karron as Cab Driver

=== Cameos ===
- Bernie Brillstein as Himself
- Gypsy Boots as Himself
- Dom DeLuise as Himself
- Budd Friedman as Himself
- George Jessel as Himself
- Gary Mule Deer as Himself
- Nina van Pallandt as Herself

== Production ==
Prior to Diary of a Young Comic, director Gary Weis was the creator over 45 short film segments for Saturday Night Live (SNL). SNL's creator, Lorne Michaels, served as the film's executive producer.

The script was written by Richard Lewis and Bennett Tramer, based on a story originally conceived by Weis. Weis decided to put Lewis in the film after watching him perform at The Comedy Store in Los Angeles. Tramer approached Lewis after one of his stand up sets at The Improv and suggested that Lewis might be a good fit for a project he was working on with Weis.

NBC aired the film on February 3, 1979, during SNL's timeslot, while the show was on hiatus.

== Critical reception ==
Reviews of the film were mixed, but mostly positive. Owen McNally of the Hartford Courant wrote: "Diary of a Young Comic is a clever, offbeat, often amusing special which pinch-hits rather capably for Saturday Night Live tonight on NBC...it has much of that harsh, satiric kind of comedy that makes Saturday Night Live such an invigorating blast of clean, bracing air in a medium polluted with tedium." Somewhat in contrast, Michael Kilgore of The Tampa Tribune wrote: "It's funny, mostly through an outsider's viewpoint in California, poking holes in the jacuzzi/est/mellow lifestyle there, but it's funny in a traditional way, not in the bizarre/rococo manner we've become accustomed to on Saturday Night." He added that the film "is easy entertainment, traditional comedy instead of Saturday Night's madness, but that doesn't make it dull."

John J. O'Connor of The New York Times called Diary of a Young Comic "a struggling film about a struggling young comedian. Perhaps in a clever attempt to reflect its subject, it is childish, pointless, wildly uneven and, not infrequently, devastatingly funny," and added that the film "has a generous share of nice touches." The review by Tom Jory of the Associated Press was even more positive; he referred to the film as "90 minutes of non-stop hilarity" and referred to the supporting cast as "impressive".

Howard Rosenberg of the Los Angeles Times, however, was not as impressed. He called the film a "sloppy amorphous and undisciplined story," and that "it's the kind of comedy you'd imagine Woody Allen doing as an adolescent, teasingly providing enough unpolished gems to keep us interested, and occasionally howling, but never complete satisfaction or evidence that mature artists are at work." Rosenberg added: "The energy is there and some of the humor is right on target, but the story is thin and seems to be chiefly a vehicle for one-liners and gags, even some of the best of which ultimately are ruined when carried to excess."
