= Tunnel Chase =

Tunnel Chase could refer to:

- "Tunnel Chase", a song from the Terminator soundtrack
- The Last Starfighter: Tunnel Chase, a 1984 board game
