= I Ought to Be in Pictures =

Play written by Neil Simon

- Poster for Broadway production
- Original language: English
- Written by: Neil Simon
- Subject: A struggling writer is forced to come to terms with his daughter, who he has not seen for many years
- Genre: Comedy drama

Premiere
- Date: 1979
- Place: Mark Taper Forum, Los Angeles

I Ought to Be in Pictures is a comedy drama play written by Neil Simon, his 18th. The play opened on Broadway in 1980. It was subsequently made into a film, released in 1982. The play involves a film screenwriter who has abandoned his family, and his daughter who arrives at his home, seeking his help in becoming an actress.

== Production ==
Produced by Emanuel Azenberg, the play had its premiere at the Ahmanson Theatre in Los Angeles in 1979, with Tony Curtis as Herb. After 17 previews, the Broadway production, directed by Herbert Ross, opened on April 3, 1980, at the Eugene O'Neill Theatre, where it ran for 324 performances. Ron Leibman (replacing Tony Curtis) as Herb, Dinah Manoff as Libby and Joyce Van Patten as Steffy comprised the cast. Bill Macy and Dick Latessa subsequently portrayed Herb.

Dinah Manoff won the 1980 Tony Award, Best Featured Actress in a Play.

== Plot overview ==
The three-character comedy-drama involves Herbert Tucker, a struggling screenwriter with writer's block who abandoned his New York family 16 years earlier. His daughter Libby arrives at the West Hollywood home of her father, who she barely remembers. She is convinced that he can give her the Hollywood acting career she desires.

Filled with guilt and demanding love, Libby not only forces Herb to deal with the responsibilities of parenthood, but to come to terms with his on-again/off-again relationship with girlfriend Steffy.

== Film adaptation ==
Simon adapted his play for a 1982 feature film directed by Herbert Ross. Manoff reprised her role of Libby, with Walter Matthau as Herb and Ann-Margret as Steffy. Additional characters portrayed by Lance Guest and David Faustino, among others, were added to the plot.

== Awards and nominations ==
=== Original Broadway production ===
| Year | Award | Category | Nominee | Result |
|---|---|---|---|---|
| 1980 | Tony Award | Best Featured Actress in a Play | Dinah Manoff | Won |
| 1980 | Drama Desk Award | Outstanding Set Design | David Jenkins | Nominated |
| 1980 | Theatre World Award | | Dinah Manoff | Won |
