= Abigail Mavity =

American actress

- Born: Abigail Elizabeth Mavity; March 4, 1993 (age 33); Mesa, Arizona, U.S.
- Occupation: Actress
- Years active: 1999–2015

Abigail Elizabeth Mavity (born March 4, 1993) is an American former actress who has appeared on a number of television series and commercials, as well as in feature films.

== Life and career ==
Abigail was born in Mesa, Arizona, the youngest of ten children. In January 1999 she moved from Arizona to Los Angeles to further her acting career.

Since that time, she has appeared regularly in numerous films and television shows, as well as many commercials and voice-over roles. She was nominated for a Young Artist Award in 2003 for her role as Kathy Martin on the series Haunted with Matthew Fox, and Mark Hoppus from the group Blink-182. She was also nominated for a Young Artist Award for her recurring role as Lisa Grubner on the Disney XD series Zeke and Luther. She has had leading parts in two Hallmark movies.

== Filmography ==
=== Television ===
Year	Title	Role	Notes
1999	Judging Amy	Ashley Oakes	Episode: "Victim Soul" (CBS)
2000	Touched by an Angel	Millie	Episode: "Pandora's Box" (CBS)
2000	Family Law	Marla Anderson	Episode: "Telling Lies, Conclusion" (CBS)
2001	Strong Medicine	Raquel	Episode: "Child Care" (Lifetime)
2001	The Fighting Fitzgeralds	Marie Fitzgerald	8 episodes (NBC)
2001	Gideon's Crossing	Leah Culman	Episode: "Clinical Enigma" (CBS)
2001	When Billie Beat Bobby	Billie (age 5)	TV movie
2001	The Jennie Project	Sarah Archibald	Disney MOW
2002	Chevy Chase Pilot Project	Claire Potts	Unsold pilot (NBC)
2002	Becker	Abigail	Episode: "Let's Talk About Sex" (CBS)
2002	Buffy the Vampire Slayer	Sara (age 8)	Episode: "Hell's Bells" (UPN)
2002	Haunted	Kathy Martin	Episode: "Three Hour Tour" (UPN)
2003	Two and a Half Men	Brianna	Episode: "Twenty-five Little Pre-pubers Without a Snoot-ful"
2004	Angel	Hannah	Episode: "Smile Time" (UPN)
2004	Malcolm in the Middle	Meagan	Episode: "Lois' Sister" (Fox)
2004	Method & Red	Daughter	Pilot (Fox)
2004	Summerland	Martha McFarlane	4 episodes (WB)
2004	Gilmore Girls	Joanna Krumholtz	Episode: "A Messenger, Nothing More" (WB)
2004	Drake & Josh	Pigtail Girl	Episode: "Drew & Jerry" (Nickelodeon)
2004	Cold Case	Rita Baxter	Episode: "The Sleepover" (CBS)
2007	Star and Stella Save the World	Star Sanders	Pilot movie (Nickelodeon)
2008	NCIS	Jordan Wright	Episode: "Stakeout" (CBS)
2008	A Kiss at Midnight	Jennifer Sherman	Hallmark movie
2009	The Mentalist	Celia	Episode: "Throwing Fire" (CBS)
2009–12	Zeke and Luther	Lisa Grubner	8 episodes (Disney XD)
2010	Love Begins	Cassie Barlow	Hallmark movie
2011	Love Bites	Kit	Episode: "Sky High" (NBC)
2012	Isabel	Karen	Pilot movie (NBC)
2012	Rizzoli and Isles	Dania	Episode: "Virtual Love" (TNT)
2014	Grey's Anatomy	Ariel	Episode: "You've Got to Hide Your Love Away" (ABC)
2014–15	Sofia the First	Princess Lani / Tempest	3 episodes (Disney)

=== Film ===
Year	Title	Role	Notes
2002	Coastlines	Rachel Lockhart	Indie
2002	100 Mile Rule	Kaitlin Davis	Indie
2005	Final Fantasy VII: Advent Children	Additional voices	Anime
2006	Whisper of the Heart	Nao	Anime
2008	The Onion Movie	Roseanne McCormick	
2010	The Other Side	Jenny	Short film
2013	The Ultimate Life	Teenage Hanna Roberts	

=== Video games ===
- L.A. Noire (2011) as Michelle Moller
