= Richard Lewis (comedian) =

American stand-up comedian (1947–2024)

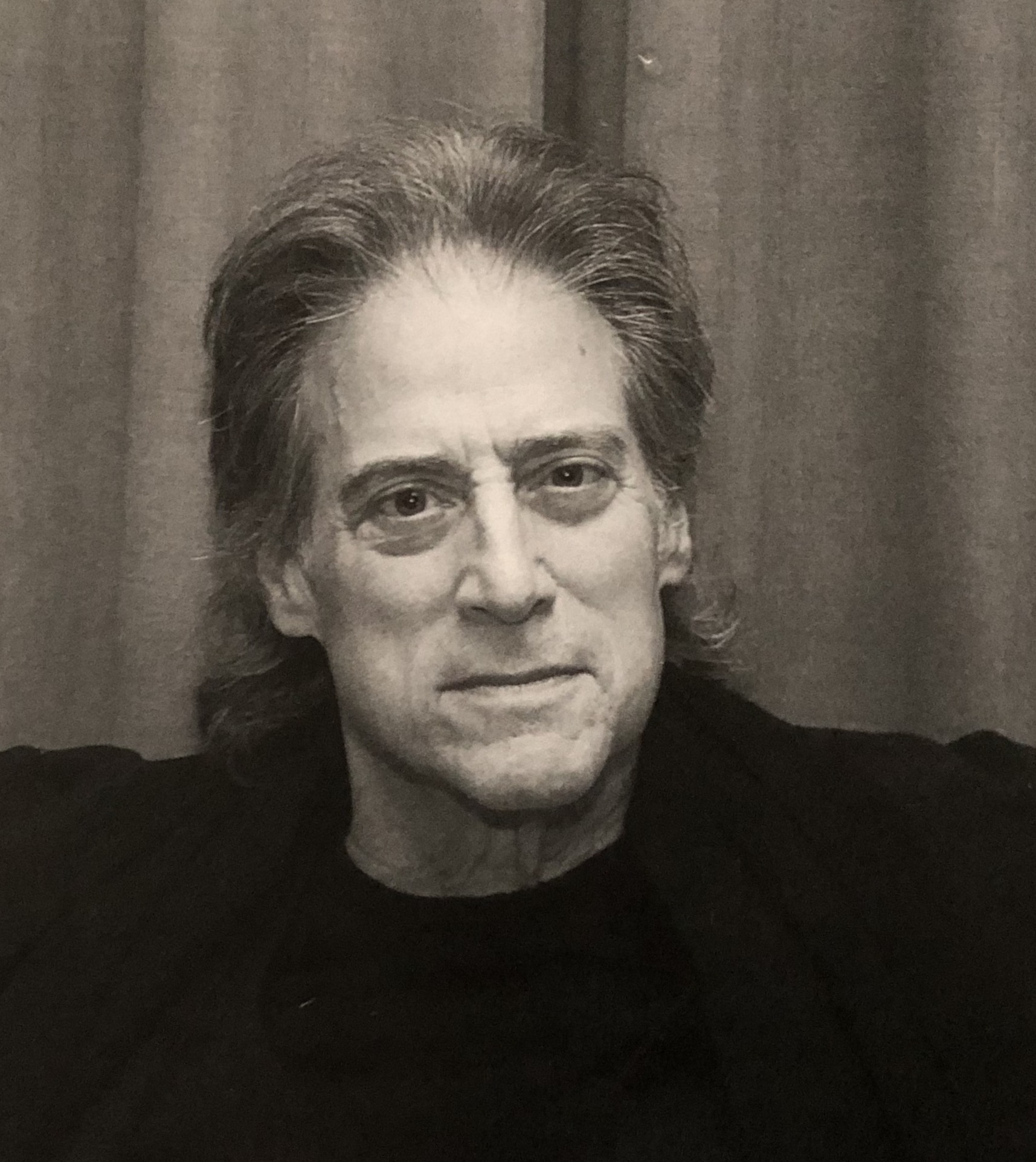
- Lewis in 2015
- Born: Richard Philip Lewis; June 29, 1947; New York City, U.S.
- Died: February 27, 2024 (aged 76); Los Angeles, California, U.S.
- Resting place: Temple of Aaron Cemetery, Roseville, Minnesota, U.S.
- Education: Ohio State University (BSBA)
- Notable work: Anything but Love; Curb Your Enthusiasm; Robin Hood: Men in Tights
- Spouse: Joyce Lapinsky (m. 2005)

Comedy career
- Years active: 1971–2024
- Medium: Stand-up; television; film
- Genres: Dark comedy; surreal humor
- Subjects: Self-deprecation; neuroticism; psychotherapy; alcoholism; hypochondria; paranoia; depression; bipolar disorder; human sexuality; Jewish culture; pop culture; family; eating disorders; annoyance
- Website: richardlewisonline.com

Richard Philip Lewis (June 29, 1947 – February 27, 2024) was an American stand-up comedian, actor, and writer. Lewis came to prominence in the 1980s and became known for his dark, neurotic, and self-deprecating humor. As an actor, he was known for starring in the ABC sitcom Anything but Love from 1989 to 1992, and for playing the role of Prince John in the 1993 film Robin Hood: Men in Tights. Lewis also had a recurring role as a fictionalized version of himself in the HBO comedy series Curb Your Enthusiasm from 2000 to 2024.

== Early life and education ==
Lewis was born on June 29, 1947, in Brooklyn, New York City. He was raised in Englewood, New Jersey. He was born into a Jewish family, and was not especially religious. His father, Bill (died 1971), was co-owner of Ambassador Caterers in nearby Teaneck, New Jersey, and his mother, Blanche, was an actress in community theatre. Lewis was the youngest of their three children. His sister was older by 9 years, and his brother by 6. His father's catering business kept him very busy, and his siblings had both left home by the 1960s, leaving Lewis at home alone with his mother, with whom there was friction. Lewis told The Washington Post in 2014 that he suspected that his birth had been a mistake.

Lewis was known for being the class clown and causing trouble in school. He graduated from Dwight Morrow High School in 1965 and attended Ohio State University where he attained a Bachelor of Science in Business Administration in Marketing four years later in 1969. He was the recipient of the Fisher College of Business Alumni Achievement Award in November 2023.

== Career ==
Lewis first tried stand-up at an open mic in Greenwich Village in 1971. He began writing and regularly performing stand-up comedy in 1972, while working as a copywriter for an advertising agency by day. He was discovered by comedian David Brenner while performing in Greenwich Village. Brenner helped Lewis's career by introducing him to the comedy clubs in Los Angeles and getting Lewis his first appearance on The Tonight Show. By the mid-1970s, Lewis had appeared on The Tonight Show Starring Johnny Carson and publications, such as the New York Daily News and New York magazine, were naming him one of the "new breed" or "class" of comedians; this list containing names such as Robert Klein, Lily Tomlin, Richard Pryor, George Carlin, Andy Kaufman, Richard Belzer, and Elayne Boosler. His influences were Richard Pryor, Buster Keaton, Woody Allen, and Lenny Bruce.

Lewis was known for dark comedy, self-deprecation, and for frank discussions regarding his many neuroses, as well as his struggles with alcoholism and drug addiction. He was noted for wearing all-black attire and for pacing and gesticulating wildly during his stand-up act. In his early days, he was also known for bringing taped-together sheets from a legal pad to his performances; he would lay them across the floor in front of him to remind him of joke premises and topics he wished to cover during his performance.

Lewis made his screen acting debut in Diary of a Young Comic, a 90-minute film that aired on NBC in 1979 in the timeslot normally reserved for episodes of Saturday Night Live. A satirical look at the Hollywood scene, Lewis stars in the film as Billy Gondola (born Gondolstein), a young Jewish comedian who leaves New York City to find fame in Los Angeles. The film's script was co-written by Lewis and Bennett Tramer, and was adapted from a story written by Gary Weis, who also served as the film's director. The film features Bill Macy as Billy's father, Michael Lerner as his agent, and Stacy Keach as a landlord. Performers George Jessel, Dom DeLuise, Nina van Pallandt, and Gary Mule Deer make appearances in the film as themselves.

Lewis gained much wider exposure in the 1980s and 1990s with numerous appearances on talk shows such as The Tonight Show, both Late Night and the Late Show with David Letterman, and The Howard Stern Show. He also produced the comedy special I'm in Pain, which aired on Showtime in 1985, followed by the specials I'm Exhausted, I'm Doomed, and Richard Lewis: The Magical Misery Tour, all of which aired on HBO in 1988, 1990, and 1997 respectively. From 1989 to 1992, he co-starred with Jamie Lee Curtis on the sitcom Anything but Love. He also starred on the short-lived sitcoms Daddy Dearest with Don Rickles in 1993, and Hiller and Diller with Kevin Nealon in 1998. He played Prince John in the 1993 film Robin Hood: Men in Tights, and starred as a struggling alcoholic and drug addict in the 1995 drama film Drunks. The latter film featured performances from Faye Dunaway, George Martin, Parker Posey, Howard Rollins, Spalding Gray, and Dianne Wiest, and was based on Gary Lennon's play Blackout. Lewis also appeared in the 1995 drama film Leaving Las Vegas, and the 1997 romantic comedy Hugo Pool.

Into the 2000s, Lewis had recurring roles as a B movie producer on the sitcom Rude Awakening, and as Rabbi Richard Glass on the family drama series 7th Heaven. He also had a recurring role on the sitcom Curb Your Enthusiasm as a semi-autobiographical version of himself. Lewis first met the show's star and creator, Larry David, at summer camp in Cornwall-on-Hudson, New York, when they were 12 years old; Lewis claimed that, at the time, they hated each other. The pair met again over a decade later while performing stand-up in New York and became friends.

== Recognition ==
GQ magazine included Lewis on their list of "The 20th Century's Most Influential Humorists", and Lewis was ranked No. 45 on Comedy Central's list of "100 Greatest Standups of All Time" released in 2004.

In 2006, The Yale Book of Quotations included an entry for the expression "the ______ from hell" (as in "the night from hell", "the date from hell". etc.,) that was attributed to Lewis. Lewis also petitioned the editors of Bartlett's Familiar Quotations to include the idiom, which was also worked into the plot of Curb Your Enthusiasm during the episode "The Nanny from Hell". His lawyer sent some video tapes to Bartlett's general editor Justin Kaplan showing Lewis using the phrase. Bartlett's declined, stating that the expression had predated Lewis's first taped broadcast. In response, Lewis told Entertainment Weekly that he traces popular usage of the line back to his early days on David Letterman's show.

== Personal life ==
=== Marriage ===
Lewis met Joyce Lapinsky in 1998 at a Ringo Starr album release party, while Lapinsky was working in music publishing. The pair became engaged in 2004 and married the following year.

=== Substance abuse issues ===
Lewis was open about his recovery from alcohol and drug abuse, having been a user of both cocaine and crystal meth. His addictions worsened into the 1990s, prompting Lewis to stop performing stand-up from 1991 to 1994. In a 1995 interview with the Santa Maria Times, Lewis discussed how John Candy's death the year prior had caused him to reflect upon his own life and career. The two starred together in Candy's last film, the Western-themed comedy film Wagons East. In later interviews, Lewis stated that he got sober in 1994 after winding up in a hospital emergency room due to a cocaine overdose.

Lewis published his memoir in 2000, titled The Other Great Depression. The book was reissued in 2008 with an added afterword where Lewis reflected further on his continued struggles with addiction. In 2015, he released the book Reflections from Hell: Richard Lewis' Guide on How Not to Live; it contains his commentary and observations in the form of one-liners and other comedic premises, interspersed with images created by artist Carl Nicholas Titolo.

=== Health problems and death ===
Discussions of Lewis's battles with anxiety and depression, and his multiple therapy sessions, were a fixture of his comedy. He also stated in interviews that he suffered from an eating disorder due to body dysmorphia. Lewis struggled with health problems resulting in multiple surgeries: in 2016 he shattered his right hand after falling from his roof, in 2019 he had back surgery related to acute back pain, and in early 2020 he shattered his shoulder, resulting in another surgery. In the latter year, it was revealed that Lewis had battled multiple health problems and was in great pain during the shooting of Curb Your Enthusiasm. He announced that he would be appearing in only one episode of Season 11. Lewis returned in Season 12, the series' final season, most episodes of which premiered after his death.

In April 2023, Lewis announced he had been diagnosed with Parkinson's disease two years earlier. He said he would no longer perform stand-up comedy and was instead "focused on writing and acting".

Lewis died of a heart attack at his home in Los Angeles on February 27, 2024, at the age of 76. Friends and colleagues, including Curb Your Enthusiasm co-star Cheryl Hines and the show's creator, Larry David, made statements regarding Lewis' death and paid homage to him. He is buried at the Temple of Aaron Cemetery in Roseville, Minnesota.

== Filmography ==
=== Film ===
Film work by Richard Lewis
Year	Title	Role
1988	The Wrong Guys	Richard
1989	That's Adequate	Pimples Lapedes
1992	Once Upon a Crime	Julian Peters
1993	Robin Hood: Men in Tights	Prince John
1994	Wagons East	Phil Taylor
1995	Drunks	Jim
1995	Leaving Las Vegas	Peter
1996	The Elevator	Phil Milowski
1997	Hugo Pool	Chick Chicalini
1997	The Maze	Markov
1999	Game Day	Steve Adler
2005	Sledge: The Untold Story	Himself
2012	Vamps	Danny
2014	She's Funny That Way	Al Finkelstein
2017	Sandy Wexler	Testimonial
2018	The Great Buster: A Celebration	Himself

=== Television ===
Television work by Richard Lewis
Year	Title	Role	Notes
1974–1992	The Tonight Show Starring Johnny Carson	Himself – Guest	22 episodes
1979	Diary of a Young Comic	Billy Goldstein	Television movie
1980	House Calls	Dr. Leon Prometheus	Episode: "The Phantom of Kensington"
1982–1993	Late Night with David Letterman	Himself – Guest	48 episodes
1985	Temporary Insanity	Performer	Television movie
1986	Riptide	Andrew Fitzsimmons Carlton III	Episode: "The Wedding Bell Blues"
1987	Harry	Richard Breskin	7 episodes
1987	CBS Summer Playhouse	Joey	Episode: "King of the Building"
1988	Tattingers	Longo	Episode : "Death and Taxis"
1989–1992	Anything but Love	Marty Gold	56 episodes
1992	The Danger of Love	Edward Sanders	Television movie
1993	Daddy Dearest	Steven Mitchell	13 episodes
1993	TriBeCa	Joseph	Episode: "Stepping Back"
1993	The Larry Sanders Show	Himself	Episode: "Life Behind Larry"
1993–2008	Late Show with David Letterman	Himself – Guest	9 episodes
1994	Tales from the Crypt	Vern	Episode: "Whirlpool"
1995–2008	Late Night with Conan O'Brien	Himself – Guest	12 episodes
1995	A.J.'s Time Travelers	Edgar Allan Poe	Episode: "Edgar Allan Poe"
1996	A Weekend in the Country	Bobby Stein	Television movie
1996	Nichols and May: Take Two	Himself	Documentary Special, PBS
1996–2015	The Daily Show	Himself	16 episodes
1997	Happily Ever After: Fairy Tales for Every Child	Old Beggar (voice)	Episode: "The Golden Goose"
1997	Dr. Katz, Professional Therapist	Richard (voice)	Episode: "Undercover"
1997–1998	Hiller and Diller	Neil Diller	13 episodes
1998	Rude Awakening	Harve Schwartz	6 episodes
1999	Hercules	Neurosis (voice)	Episode: "Hercules and the Tiff on Olympus"
1999	V.I.P.	Ronald Zane	Episode: "Big Top Val"
1999	Larry David: Curb Your Enthusiasm	Himself	Television movie – Pilot
2000–2024	Curb Your Enthusiasm	Himself	45 episodes
2002	Presidio Med	Francis Weinod	Episode: "Once Upon a Family"
2002–2004	7th Heaven	Rabbi Richard Glass	9 episodes
2003	Alias	Mitchell Yaeger	Episode: "A Dark Turn"
2004	Two and a Half Men	Stan	Episode: "I Can't Afford Hyenas"
2004	The Dead Zone	Jack Jericho	Episode: "The Cold Hard Truth"
2005	Las Vegas	Stan	Episode: "Fake the Money and Run"
2005	George Lopez	Phillip Nickleson	Episode: "George Finds Therapy Benny-ficial"
2006	The Simpsons	Golem (voice)	Episode: "Treehouse of Horror XVII"
2006	Everybody Hates Chris	Kris	Episode: "Everybody Hates Kris"
2007	Mr. Warmth: The Don Rickles Project	Himself	Documentary, PBS
2008	Law & Order: Special Victims Unit	Sportsman Larry (voice)	Episode: "Closet"
2009	The Cleaner	Henry	Episode: "Trick Candles"
2009–2010	'Til Death	Miles Tunnicliff	3 episodes
2010	Funny or Die Presents	Shades (voice)	Episode: #1.10
2011	Lewis on Film: The Oscar Edition	Performer	Short
2011	Pound Puppies	Buddy (voice)	Episode: "Rebel Without a Collar"
2013	Mel Brooks: Make Some Noise	Himself	Documentary Special, PBS
2015	Blunt Talk	Dr. Weiss	6 episodes
2016	Code Black	Stewart Gough	Episode: "Hero Complex"
2018	BoJack Horseman	Ziggy Abler (voice)	Episode: "Head in the Clouds"

== Awards and nominations ==
Accolades for Richard Lewis
Year	Award	Category	Nominated work	Result	Ref(s)
1989	CableACE Award	Writing a Comedy Special	The I'm Exhausted Concert	Nominated	
1991	Viewers for Quality Television	Best Actor – Quality Comedy Series	Anything but Love	Nominated	
2006	Screen Actors Guild Award	Outstanding Ensemble in a Comedy Series	Curb Your Enthusiasm	Nominated	

== Bibliography ==
- Lewis, Richard (December 26, 2000). The Other Great Depression: How I'm Overcoming on a Daily Basis at Least a Million Dysfunctions and Finding a Spiritual (Sometimes) Life. New York: PublicAffairs. ISBN 978-1-891620-93-5. OCLC 45065989.
  - —— (2008). The Other Great Depression: How I'm Overcoming on a Daily Basis at Least a Million Dysfunctions and Finding a Spiritual (Sometimes) Life (Reissue ed.). New York: PublicAffairs. ISBN 9781586486044. OCLC 172980541. Includes added afterword.
- —— (2015). Reflections from Hell: Richard Lewis' Guide on How Not to Live. Illustrator: Carl Nicholas Titolo. powerHouse Books: Brooklyn, NY. ISBN 9781576877456. OCLC 886745435.
