= I'm Losing You (novel) =

1996 novel by Bruce Wagner

- Author: Bruce Wagner
- Language: English
- Publisher: Villard
- Publication date: July 2, 1996
- Publication place: United States
- Media type: Print (hardback & paperback)
- Pages: 319 pp.
- ISBN: 0-679-41927-6
- OCLC: 33971102
- Dewey Decimal: 813/.54 20
- LC Class: PS3573.A369 I47 1996

I'm Losing You is a 1996 novel by the American novelist, screenwriter and director Bruce Wagner. Wagner adapted his novel for, and directed, a 1998 film of the same title, starring Frank Langella and Daniel von Bargen. The film adaptation grossed $12,688 in limited release.
