= A Carol Christmas =

2003 television film

- Written by: Tom Amundsen
- Directed by: Matthew Irmas
- Starring: Tori Spelling; Dinah Manoff; William Shatner; Jason Brooks; Gary Coleman
- Theme music composer: Roger Bellon
- Country of origin: United States
- Original language: English

Production
- Producers: Robert Halmi, Jr. Larry Levinson; Albert T. Dickerson III
- Cinematography: Geza Sinkovics
- Editors: Jennifer Jean Cacavas; Thomas A. Krueger
- Running time: 120 minutes
- Production companies: Larry Levinson Productions; Hallmark Entertainment

Original release
- Network: Hallmark Channel
- Release: December 7, 2003

A Carol Christmas is a TV movie starring Tori Spelling, Dinah Manoff, William Shatner, Jason Brooks and Gary Coleman. It premiered on the Hallmark Channel in 2003. The film is an adaptation of Charles Dickens' 1843 novella A Christmas Carol.

== Plot ==
Carol Cartman is a conceited sensationalist talk show host. She is cynical, selfish, and generally treats her employees with cold contempt. She has been coached by her late Aunt Marla to behave this way, and holds true to it; she despises Christmas and values hardly anyone.

On Christmas Eve, several hours before her talk show is set to go on the air for a holiday special, Carol is haunted by the spirit of Aunt Marla, who is bound in golden chains that were forged by her misdeeds in life. Aunt Marla warns Carol of the mistakes she made in her own life, and the terrible similar fate awaiting Carol if she does not change. Aunt Marla warns her that she will be visited by three spirits that will show her her wrongs and attempt to steer her back on the right path.

At 12 noon, the Ghost of Christmas Past shows Carol incidents from her childhood to adulthood where Aunt Marla shaped Carol into the person she is in the present: Marla fought for Carol to get the lead role in a Christmas play over another little girl who deserved the part, drove away her boyfriend, John Joyce, who was going to propose marriage to her, and pushed to advance her niece's career in order to bolster herself financially. Carol and the ghost's last stop is Aunt Marla's sparsely-attended funeral.

The Ghost of Christmas Present takes Carol to see how John, her sister Beth, and assistant Roberta will spend this Christmas. John continues his work helping to feed the homeless, while Beth and her husband read A Christmas Carol to their children. Roberta's festivities with her daughter Lily and Carol's studio manager Jimmy are disrupted by a visit by Roberta's ex-husband and Lily's father Frank. The two addresses each other bitterly, and he reveals that he intends to take her to court for custody of Lily, and presents her with a document stating the same.

The Ghost of Christmas Future is a mute limo driver who takes Carol on a tour, showing her what will happen the following Christmas if she does not change. Carol walks off her show after refusing to do a segment that hits too close to home for her, and her studio boss sues her for breach of contract; as a result, her career bottoms out and she is reduced to poverty and making low-level community appearances. Finally, Carol watches herself die and learns that her funeral will have even fewer attendees than that of her Aunt Marla, with only Roberta and Jimmy attending. Roberta reveals that Lily is now married and living in Chicago, and the two do not speak to each other much due to the former's belief that her mother prioritized work over her. Suddenly stuck in a coffin, Carol pleads for another chance at life. The ghost shakes his head and closes it, but Carol wakes up in her dressing room soon, terrified.

Changed by the encounters with the ghosts, Carol becomes a warm, caring person, and vows to make amends. She goes on to her television show and gives a touching speech to her audience about the importance of Christmas and giving. She also gives Roberta a raise, and time to be with Lily, and offers her her lawyer's assistance against her ex-husband's (future) attempt to get custody of Lily. After the show, she goes to her sister's house to spend the holidays with Beth and her family and reconciles with John, who has retained his feelings for her over the years.

At the very end, the three Christmas Spirits reappear outside Beth's house and comment on their work at transforming Carol Cartman. They watch and listen as Beth's son recites the last line of A Christmas Carol: "God bless us, every one!"

== Cast ==
- Tori Spelling as Carol Cartman, who is based on Ebenezer Scrooge
  - Gage Golightly as Young Carol
- Dinah Manoff as Aunt Marla, who is based on Jacob Marley
- William Shatner as Dr. Bob/the Ghost of Christmas Present
- Gary Coleman as the Ghost of Christmas Past
- Michael Landes as Jimmy
- Paula Trickey as Beth, Carol's sister who is married and has two children, and who is based on Ebenezer Scrooge's nephew Fred.
- Nina Siemaszko as Roberta Timmins, who is based on Bob Cratchit.
- Jason Brooks as John Joyce, who is based on Belle.
- Holmes Osborne as Hal, Carol's studio manager.
- Holliston Coleman as Lily, who is based on Tiny Tim.
- James Cromwell as the Ghost of Christmas Future (uncredited)

== Production ==
Filming for A Carol Christmas took place in Los Angeles during September 2003. Tom Amundsen was brought on to write the film's script and Spelling was brought on to star as the titular character. Of the film, Spelling commented that one of her dreams was to star in a Christmas film that she could show her future children, further noting that she had "never played a mean-spirited person before, I'm always the good girl".

== Release ==
A Carol Christmas premiered on The Hallmark Channel on December 7, 2003.

== Reception ==
In 2012 Complex's Jason Serafino named the film one of the "15 most ridiculous Hallmark movies of all time", citing the creative decision to cast Shatner and Coleman as the reason for the film's inclusion. The following year Jon Brooks of KQED watched A Carol Christmas as one of eight adaptations of A Christmas Carol, criticizing it as time wasted and that "Remember, the average life expectancy in the U.S is just 692,000 hours, and these 92 minutes shouldn’t be spared."

== See also ==
- List of Christmas films
- List of ghost films
- Adaptations of A Christmas Carol
