= Dinah Manoff =

American actress

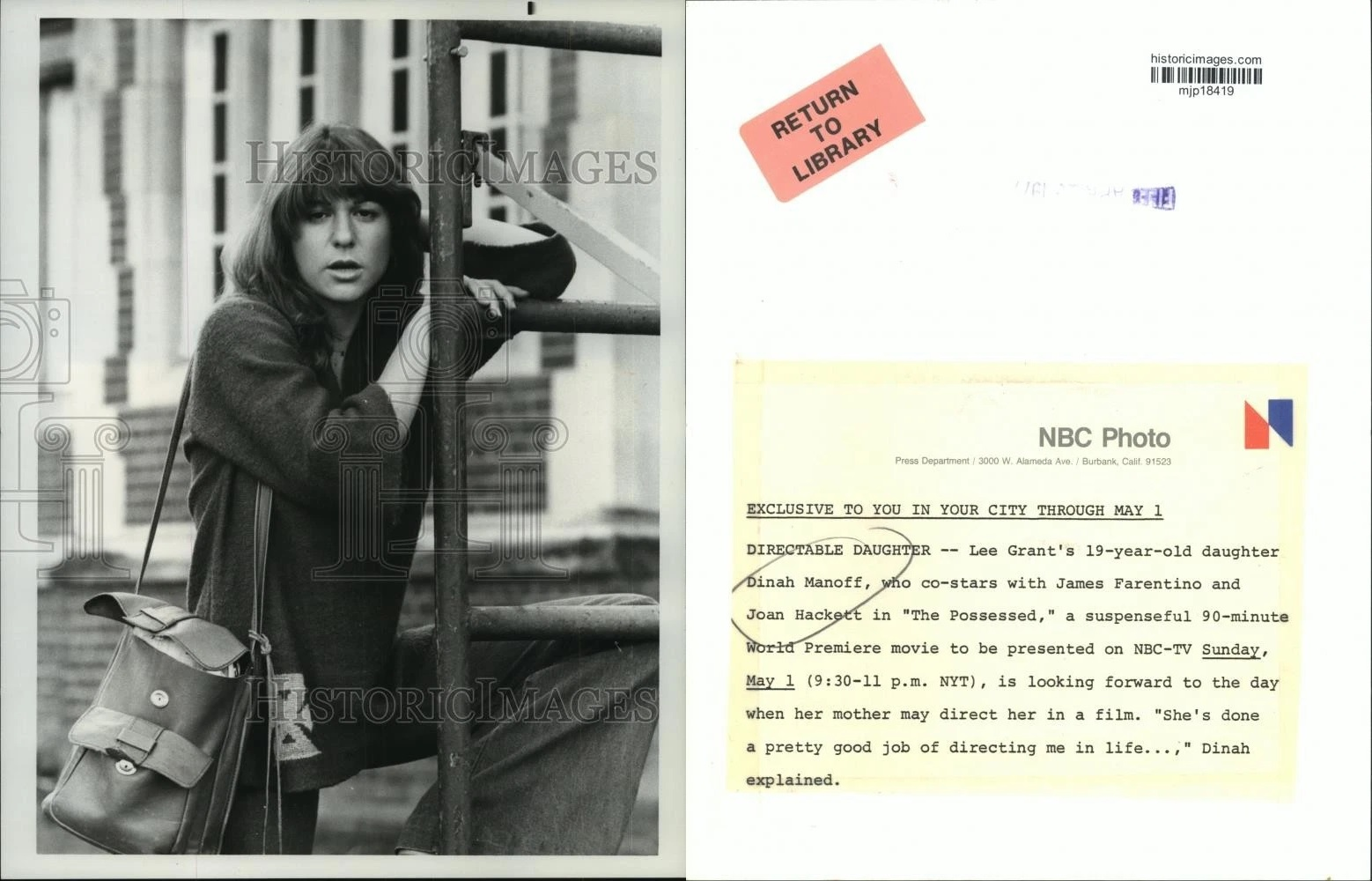
- Manoff in The Possessed (1977)
- Born: January 25, 1956 (age 70); New York City, U.S.
- Education: Actors Studio
- Occupations: Actress, television director
- Years active: 1975–present
- Spouses: Jean-Marc Joubert (m. 1980; div. 1985) Arthur Mortell (m. 1997)
- Children: 3
- Parent(s): Arnold Manoff; Lee Grant

Dinah Manoff (born January 25, 1956) is an American stage, film, and television actress and television director. She is best known for her roles as Carol Weston on Empty Nest, Elaine Lefkowitz on Soap, Marty Maraschino in the film Grease, and Libby Tucker in both the stage and film adaptations of I Ought to Be in Pictures, for which she won a Tony Award.

== Early life ==
Manoff was born in New York City to Ashkenazi Jewish parents, the daughter of actress, director, and writer Lee Grant (born Lyova Rosenthal) and screenwriter Arnold Manoff (born Pismenoff). Her mother was of Polish and Ukrainian Jewish descent, and her father's parents emigrated from Vilnius. Her half-brother, Tom Manoff, is the classical music critic for NPR's All Things Considered and a notable composer. Her stepfather is producer Joseph Feury.

She spent her childhood and teenage years in New York City and Malibu, California. She attended the New Lincoln School and Santa Monica High School and later studied at the Actors Studio.

== Career ==
=== 1970s ===
Manoff's first project was the animated independent film Everybody Rides the Carousel (1975), providing one of the voices. In 1976, she made her first television appearance on the PBS production of The Stronger. This was followed by a guest appearance on Welcome Back, Kotter in the episode "Sadie Hawkins Day", followed by an appearance in Visions. In 1977, she made a cameo appearance in her first TV movie, Raid on Entebbe In 1978 she appeared in the TV series Family playing the part of Mara.

In 1978, Manoff got the role of Elaine Dallas (née Lefkowitz) on the ABC sitcom Soap, and remained on the show until the end of the year. Manoff made her film debut in 1978 as Marty Maraschino, one of the Pink Ladies, in the movie version of Grease.

=== 1980s ===
In 1980, Manoff made her Broadway debut as Libby Tucker in Neil Simon's play, I Ought to Be in Pictures. For her work in the play, she won the Tony Award for Best Performance by a Featured Actress in a Play, as well as the Theatre World Award. She reprised the role for the film version in 1982, with Walter Matthau and Ann-Margret. Also in 1980, Manoff appeared as Karen, the suicidal friend of Timothy Hutton's character, in the multiple Oscar-winning Ordinary People.

In 1985, Manoff portrayed songwriter Ellie Greenwich in the Broadway jukebox musical Leader of the Pack. In 1988, she played Maggie Peterson in Child's Play, the first character to be killed by the murderous, possessed doll Chucky. Manoff then started a seven-year stint as Carol Weston on the NBC sitcom Empty Nest, which was a spin off of The Golden Girls, a role for which she is best known on television, and appeared in every episode of the series. In 1989, Manoff appeared in minor roles in two films late in the year: Bloodhounds of Broadway and Staying Together.

=== 1990s ===
In 1990, Manoff appeared in Welcome Home, Roxy Carmichael, starring Winona Ryder and Jeff Daniels. After this, Manoff focused primarily on television work, appearing in a cameo role in an episode of Blossom entitled "Rockumentary" and TV movies such as Babies and Maid for Each Other, as well as continuing on Empty Nest as actress and director on two episodes until its finale in 1995; she also appeared on The Golden Girls twice as Carol Weston during this period. Manoff's subsequent TV appearances included Touched by an Angel, Cybill, and George and Leo.

In 1999, Manoff directed the 82nd episode of the television series Sabrina the Teenage Witch, titled "Prelude to a Kiss."

=== 2000s–present ===
In 2000, Manoff appeared in the TV movie The Lost Child starring Mercedes Ruehl. Just a few months later in 2001, Manoff returned to film work by starring in The Amati Girls, the sole movie released theatrically in which her mother and she have appeared together. The film also featured Mercedes Ruehl, Sean Young, and Lily Knight. Manoff appeared in a second 2001 movie, Zigs, starring Beverly Hills, 90210's Jason Priestley. From 2001 to 2002, Manoff co-starred in the cable television series State of Grace. In 2003, Manoff played Aunt Marla in A Carol Christmas, a variation on Charles Dickens' classic story.

In celebration of the poet Oscar Wilde's 150th birthday in 2004, Manoff read some of his works in the documentary Happy Birthday Oscar Wilde. After a four-year hiatus, Manoff appeared in the film Bart Got a Room in 2009, which premiered at the Tribeca Film Festival, but was not released widely until the following year, when Dinah also appeared in two episodes of Lose Yourself on Strike.TV.

In 2010, Grease was released a second time as a sing-along. Coinciding with its release, Manoff appeared at the Seattle International Film Festival.

== Personal life ==
Since 1997, Manoff has been married to realtor Arthur Mortell, and currently resides in Bainbridge Island, Washington. They have three sons together: Dashiell Mortell, and twins Desi and Oliver Mortell. Dashiell was killed in an automobile accident on January 7, 2017, age 19.

== Selected filmography ==
Films
Year	Title	Role	Notes
1975	Everybody Rides the Carousel	Stage 7 (voice)	Voice
1976	The Stronger		
1977	Raid on Entebbe	Rachel Sager	
1978	Grease	Marty Maraschino	
1980	Ordinary People	Karen Aldrich	
1982	I Ought to Be in Pictures	Libby Tucker	
1988	Backfire	Jill Tyson	
1988	Child's Play	Maggie Peterson	
1989	Bloodhounds of Broadway	Maude Miligan	
1989	Staying Together	Lois Cook	
1990	Welcome Home, Roxy Carmichael	Evelyn Whittacher	
2000	The Amati Girls	Denise	
2001	Zigs	Marge	Alternative title: Double Down
2004	Happy Birthday Oscar Wilde	Herself	Documentary
2008	Bart Got a Room	Mrs. Goodson	
2017	Cult of Chucky	Maggie Peterson	Archive footage

Television
Year	Title	Role	Notes
1976	Welcome Back, Kotter	Charmaine	Episode: "Sadie Hawkins Day"
1976	Visions	Gisella Farkas	Episode: "The Great Cherub Knitwear Strike"
1976	Raid on Entebbe	Rachel Sager	Television movie
1977	Night Terror	Attendant's Girlfriend	Television movie
1977	The Possessed	Celia	Television movie
1978	Family	Mara	Episode: "Sleeping Gypsy"
1978	Soap	Elaine Lefkowitz	16 episodes
1979	$weepstake$	Maggie	Episode: "Dewey and Harold and Sarah and Maggie"
1979	Lou Grant	Joanie Hume	Episode: Bomb"
1979	Mork & Mindy	Kathy	Episode: "Mork's Baby Blues"
1981	For Ladies Only	Mary Louise	Television movie
1982	Table Settings		Television movie
1984	A Matter of Sex	Glennis	Television movie
1984	The Seduction of Gina	Mary	Television movie
1984	Celebrity	Missy Craymore	Miniseries
1984	Flight 90: Disaster on the Potomac	Priscilla Tirado	Television movie
1984	Night Court	Sister Sara	Episode: "The Nun"
1984	Hot Pursuit	Gillian	Episode: "Gillian"
1984	Cagney & Lacey	Jane Tanton	Episode: "Fathers & Daughters"
1986	Classified Love	Theresa Leonetti	Television movie
1987	Murder, She Wrote	Jenny Coopersmith	Episode: "Murder in a Minor Key"
1987	CBS Summer Playhouse	Franny	Episode: "Sirens"
1987	Brothers		Episode: "Las Vegas Serenade (Part 1)"
1988-1995	Empty Nest	Carol Weston	170 episodes
1989	The Cover Girl and the Cop	Denise Danielovitch	Television movie
1990	Babies	Laura	Television movie
1991-1992	The Golden Girls	Carol Weston	2 episodes
1992	Maid for Each Other	Tibby Bloom	Television movie
1992	Nurses	Carol Weston	2 episodes
1993	The John Larroquette Show	Kelly	Episode: "Newcomer"
1995	Touched by an Angel	Callie Martin	Episode: "Interview with an Angel"
1995	Sister, Sister	–	Director, Episode: "Weird Science"
1996	Cybill	Amy Fitzpatrick	2 episodes
1996	Minor Adjustments	–	Director, Episode: "My Fair Darby"
1998	George and Leo	Mary	Episode: "The Other Bookstore"
1999	Brother's Keeper	–	Director, 3 episodes
1999	Movie Stars	–	Director, 2 episodes
1999	Sabrina the Teenage Witch	–	Director, Episode: "Prelude to a Kiss"
2000	The Lost Child	Helen	Television movie
2002	State of Grace	Evelyn Rayburn	38 episodes
2003	A Carol Christmas	Aunt Marla	Television movie
