= Young Lust (film) =

1984 American film

- Directed by: Gary Weis
- Written by: Bruce Wagner; Robin Menken
- Produced by: Robert Stigwood; George Van Noy
- Starring: Fran Drescher; Mews Small
- Cinematography: Charles Rosher Jr.
- Edited by: James Coblentz
- Music by: Patrick Williams
- Production companies: Robert Stigwood Organisation; Paramount
- Distributed by: Paramount
- Release date: April 27, 1984
- Country: United States
- Language: English

Young Lust is a 1984 American comedy film directed by Gary Weis and starring Fran Drescher, Mews Small and Dana Carvey. It was co-financed by Paramount, who picked up the production from Robert Stigwood's RSO Films.

It was an early script by Bruce Wagner, co-written with Robin Menken. The film is a spoof of soap opera tropes with a large ensemble cast.

It was test screened in Las Vegas on 19 February 1982 and subsequently given a brief theatrical release in Austin, Texas from 27 April to 11 May 1984. Other than these screenings, the film has not been exhibited since, nor released on home video, cable television or streaming.

== Cast ==
- Fran Drescher as Sondra Banning
- Mews Small as Connie Main
- Dana Carvey as Dwayne Bimster
- Lyman Ward as Dick Danner
- Jeff Pomerantz as Pete Borsalino
- Allan Arbus as Dr Smetch
- James Booth as Conrad Main
- Dey Young as Debby Bimster
- Woody Brown as Mickey Main
- Terry Kiser as Howard Levinthal
- Alley Mills as Sheila Danner
- George Wendt as Avery Lumpig
- Mary Woronov as Nicole Dunning
- Larry Hankin as Binney
- John Roarke as Coach Blot
- Seymour Cassel as Dr Klapper
- Dorothy Constantine as Elaine Bimster
- Edith Fields as Mrs Bodkey
- Lucy Lee Flippin as Peggy Smetch
- Roger Wilson as Jerry
- Howard Mann as Vince Borsalino
- Sally Marr as Hanna Levinthal
- Justin Dana as Herbert Danner
- Dean R. Miller as Brian
- Michael W. Schwartz as Donald

== Production ==
The film was part of a slate of projects that Paramount rushed into production. In April 1982 the film was tentatively meant to come out in May. In June 1982 Paramount said they had no plans to release it.

A May 1983 article said the film "was such a mess that it has yet to be officially delivered to Paramount."

Bruce Wagner later said "I think the director was having some problems at the time with the studio and it was never released. It was a protracted death because a year was spent editing it." Wagner says after a year he was approached to work on the movie for reshoots. "That was also the year where a lot of movies like Young Doctors in Love and raucous comedies like National Lampoon’s Vacation [were released] and this movie... was very transgressive. The fact that it was not made informed a lot of my future work in writing about failure and shame. I certainly would have written about those things anyway, but in terms of my Hollywood experience, my entrée was one of defeat rather than of triumph."

== Legacy ==
Wagner said "That experience formed a template of failure and humiliation that has been a mother lode for me. Those were aspects of career not personal anguish that I drew from."

Director Gary Weis never directed another feature, going on to helm music videos such as Paul Simon's You Can Call Me Al, as well as the Chris Elliot comedy short Action Family. Weis subsequently went on to a successful career in television commercials.
