= The Jennie Project =

- Film poster
- Based on: Jennie by Douglas Preston
- Written by: Douglas Preston; Charles Leavitt; Gary Nadeau
- Directed by: Gary Nadeau
- Starring: Lance Guest; Alex D. Linz; Sheila Kelley; Abigail Mavity; Sheryl Lee Ralph
- Theme music composer: Phil Marshall
- Country of origin: United States
- Original language: English

Production
- Producers: Charles Hirschhorn; Christopher Morgan
- Cinematography: Donald M. Morgan
- Editor: Richard Nord
- Running time: 76 minutes
- Production companies: Stu Segall Productions; Fountain Productions

Original release
- Network: Disney Channel
- Release: July 13, 2001

The Jennie Project is a 2001 American drama film released as a Disney Channel Original Movie in the summer of 2001. The film was based on the book Jennie by Douglas Preston. The movie is about a chimpanzee who knows and uses American Sign Language to communicate.

== Plot ==
Hugo Archibald (Lance Guest) is a doctor and brings home a wide variety of exotic animal species. The latest animal he brings home is a chimpanzee named Jennie. Dr. Archibald is not home very much, and Andrew, Dr. Archibald's son, feels he does not care about him.

His wife Lea (Sheila Kelley) does not want Jennie, and says she makes trouble, but the children take an instant liking to her. Jennie is unique in that she is learning to use and understand sign language.

Jennie becomes an important part of Archibald family and Andrew (Alex D. Linz) develops a close relationship with her. Jennie loves the things Andrew does, such as baseball and comic books.

Jennie is also there for Andrew when he and his father disagree. A doctor Pamela Prentiss (Sheryl Lee Ralph) starts training with Jennie. She does not agree with the way Jennie is being cared for and is seen as being rude to the Archibald family. She teaches Jennie sign language in a way that Jennie does not understand, but Lea finds a way she understands.

Dr. Prentiss tried to convince Hugo to admit Jennie in the science lab where she works, but Hugo declines, but when Jennie starts making trouble, such as taking all the mail from the mailman and eating the neighbors tulips, she is taken to court and admitted into a science lab.

Then they decide to return Jennie to Africa where she was found. The relationship between Jennie and Andrew eventually brings the whole family closer together.

== Cast ==
- Alex D. Linz as Andrew Archibald
- Sheila Kelley as Lea Archibald
- Lance Guest as Hugo Archibald
- Abigail Mavity as Sarah Archibald
- Sheryl Lee Ralph as Dr. Pam Prentiss
- Joel McKinnon Miller as Frank
- Fran Bennett as Judge
- Earl Boen as Reverend Palliser
- Kenneth Kimmins as Epstein
- Janet Rotblatt as Mrs. Palliser
- Kelvin "Kane" Gully as Monkey Poacher

== Production ==
The movie was filmed in San Diego's Balboa Park in areas resembling jungle. Other locations included the Museum of Man (where Hugo Archibald works) and the San Diego Zoo. American Humane claims that the chimpanzees in the film were rescued and owned by their trainers, and that they were used responsibly and safely in the film. Two chimpanzees Bella and Ellie were used in filming the movie. The Hollywood training company remains unlisted but animal trainers Chad Dunn and Denise Sanders are credited as working on the film. Both chimpanzees are now retired from the entertainment industry and living at the Center for Great Apes.
