= Bruce Wagner =

American novelist

- Born: Bruce Alan Wagner; March 22, 1954 (age 72); Madison, Wisconsin, U.S.
- Education: Beverly Hills High School
- Occupations: Novelist; screenwriter
- Spouses: Rebecca De Mornay (m. 1986; div. 1990) Laura Peterson (m. 2009; div. 2017)
- Partner: Jamie Rose
- Children: Billie Lourd (goddaughter)]
- Parent(s): Morton Wagner; Bernice Maletz
- Writing career
- Notable works: Wild Palms (miniseries, 1993); "I'm Losing You" (1996); The Chrysanthemum Palace" (novel, 2006); Maps to the Stars (film, 2014); ROAR: American Master, The Oral Biography of Roger Orr (2022); Amputation (novel, 2025)
- Website: brucewagner.la

Bruce Alan Wagner (born March 22, 1954) is an American novelist and screenwriter based in Los Angeles. He is known for his apocalyptic yet ultimately spiritual view of humanity as seen through the lens of Hollywood.

== Early life ==
Wagner was born in Madison, Wisconsin to Morton Wagner and Bernice Maletz. When he was four, his family moved to San Francisco, then to Los Angeles four years later. His father was a radio station executive who eventually moved into television, producing The Les Crane Show, before he became a stockbroker.

When Bruce's parents divorced, his mother worked at Saks Fifth Avenue, where she remained for 40 years. He attended Beverly Vista Elementary School in Beverly Hills, California until 8th grade. He went to Beverly Hills High School but dropped out in his junior year. He worked in bookstores, drove an ambulance for Schaefer Ambulance Service, and became a chauffeur at the Beverly Hills Hotel. He has two older sisters.

== Career ==
In his twenties, Bruce Wagner began writing articles for magazines and writing scripts. His first screenplay, Young Lust, was produced by Robert Stigwood but was never released. That experience eventually led him to write a modern take on F. Scott Fitzgerald's "Pat Hobby" short stories about an alcoholic screenwriter who never gets ahead.

Wagner self-published (with Caldecott Chubb) Force Majeure: The Bud Wiggins Stories in an edition of 1,000, which sold out at West Hollywood's Book Soup. It was optioned by Oliver Stone to direct but the project never came to fruition. Wagner has said that the script he wrote, based upon the stories' protagonist—a chauffeur named Bud Wiggins—later became Maps to the Stars, the 2014 film directed by David Cronenberg. The book was well reviewed and as a result Wagner received a publishing deal with Random House.

He has written essays and op-ed pieces for publications including The New Yorker, The New York Times, Artforum and Vanity Fair. His novel I'm Losing You was a New York Times Notable Book of the Year, and his novel The Chrysanthemum Palace was a PEN/Faulkner finalist in 2006. He has also written essays and prefaces for books by photographers William Eggleston and Manuel Alvarez Bravo, and painters Ed Ruscha and Richard Prince. In an overview of his work, the novelist John Pistelli said, "His work exists in several different epochs simultaneously, like a transcended master who has slipped the bonds of the merely temporal. In that final sense, Bruce Wagner's time has never left, is sure to arrive, and has come at last."

Wes Craven read an unproduced script of Wagner's ("They Sleep By Night") and then Craven asked Wagner to co-write A Nightmare on Elm Street 3: Dream Warriors (1987). Wagner and Craven wrote the story and share screenwriting credit with Chuck Russell and Frank Darabont. Wagner and Oliver Stone co-executive produced Wild Palms, the mini-series Wagner created, based on a comic strip which he wrote for Details. Wild Palms aired on ABC in 1993. He was the executive producer and co-writer (with Tracey Ullman) of Tracey Ullman's State of the Union series (2008 - 2010) on Showtime. In 2014, Cronenberg directed Wagner's script, Maps To The Stars, a film which Cronenberg had been trying to make for a decade. For her role as Havana Segrand, Julianne Moore won Best Actress at the Cannes Film Festival in 2014. Wagner accepted the award on her behalf. In 2020, he wrote Mother Tongue, an adaptation of his book I Met Someone. It was directed by Mike Figgis on location, in early 2021, but is yet to be released.

Wagner signed a book deal with Counterpoint Press in 2019 for his novel The Marvel Universe: Origin Stories. When he turned in the manuscript, Wagner said that the editor and publisher told him "the language is problematic." One of their objections was to the word "fat"—a 500-lb. character in the novel playfully calls herself "The Fat Joan" (an homage to the popular social media personality "The Fat Jew")—and said "not even a character can call herself that." The writer Sam Wasson wrote about the book's journey in Graydon Carter's digital magazine Air Mail ("Bruce Wagner's Woke Universe"), suspecting that Wagner's editor had been cautioned by "sensitivity readers." In the same article, Wasson quotes Wagner as saying, "My entire body of work would be thrown into a furnace if it were to be read and judged by sensitivity readers." On October 13, 2020, Wagner decided that rather than look for another publisher, he would release the novel for free, on brucewagner.la, and into the public domain. Within days, the book became available on-demand through Amazon, for which Wagner receives nothing. The book is published in a limited, signed edition by Felix Farmer Press, a new publishing house in Los Angeles, for which Wagner also receives no profit by choice.

Wagner has appeared on The Bret Easton Ellis Podcast (2015–2023), WTF with Marc Maron (2022), and Red Scare (2024).

== Personal life ==
Wagner and actress Rebecca De Mornay married on December 16, 1986, and they divorced in 1990. He then married Laura Peterson in 2009, and they also divorced in 2017. He is in a relationship with actress Jamie Rose.

== Mysticism ==
After interviewing the shaman and author Carlos Castaneda for Details in 1994, Wagner became part of Castaneda's inner circle under the assumed name of Lorenzo Drake. He directed the first videos on Tensegrity for Cleargreen. Wagner continues to be close to the group since Castaneda's death in 1998.

After Wagner's novel Memorial was favorably reviewed in that magazine by a Buddhist monk, Wagner wrote its editor, James Shaheen, a letter of thanks, and Shaheen invited him to contribute an essay about Castaneda. His first autobiographical piece about his experience with the shaman and author Castaneda appeared in the Fall 2007 issue of Tricycle magazine where he "remembers the 'simple but not easy' lessons of his teacher, Carlos Castaneda" in "The Art of Reality"." to include a quote from the article.

== Novels ==
- Force Majeure (1991)
- Wild Palms (1993) (graphic novel)
- I'm Losing You (1996)
- I'll Let You Go (2002)
- Still Holding (2003)
- The Chrysanthemum Palace (2005)
- Memorial (2006)
- Dead Stars (2012)
- The Empty Chair (2014)
- I Met Someone (2016)
- A Guide For Murdered Children (writing as Sarah Sparrow) (2018)
- The Marvel Universe: Origin Stories (2020)
- ROAR: American Master - The Oral Biography of Roger Orr (2022)
- The Met Gala & Tales of Saints and Seekers: Two Novellas (2024)
- Amputation (2025)

== Screenplays ==
- Young Lust (1984)
- A Nightmare on Elm Street 3: Dream Warriors (1987), "story by" credit, shared with Wes Craven
- Scenes from the Class Struggle in Beverly Hills (1989)
- Wild Palms (1993)
- White Dwarf (1995)
- I'm Losing You (1998), also director
- Women in Film (2001), also director
- Maps to the Stars (2014)

== Acting ==
- 2015 Knight of Cups as Bud Wiggins
- 2014 Maps to the Stars as Benjie's chauffeur (uncredited)
- 1990 Night Visions (TV Movie) as Agent
- 1989 Shocker as Executioner
- 1989 Scenes from the Class Struggle in Beverly Hills as dinner guest
- 1989 How I Got into College as "A"
- 1989 I, Madman as Pianist
- 1988 Mortuary Academy as Schuyler
- 1987 Stranded as Reporter
- 1987 The New Adventures of Beans Baxter (TV Series) as Vlodia (4 episodes)
- 1986 One Crazy Summer as Uncle Frank
- 1985 Head Office as Al Kennedy
