= Wholly Moses! =

1980 film by Gary Weis

- Film poster by Jack Rickard
- Directed by: Gary Weis
- Written by: Guy Thomas
- Produced by: Freddie Fields
- Starring: Dudley Moore; Laraine Newman; James Coco; Paul Sand; Jack Gilford; Dom DeLuise; John Houseman; Madeline Kahn; David L. Lander; Richard Pryor; John Ritter
- Cinematography: Frank Stanley
- Edited by: Sidney Levin
- Music by: Patrick Williams
- Color process: Metrocolor
- Production company: Columbia Pictures
- Distributed by: Columbia Pictures
- Release date: June 13, 1980
- Running time: 103 minutes
- Country: United States
- Language: English
- Budget: $4.5 million
- Box office: $14.2 million (domestic)

Wholly Moses! is a 1980 American Biblical spoof film written by Guy Thomas and directed by Gary Weis. Dudley Moore plays Old Testament-era idol maker Herschel, whose life and adventures seem to parallel that of the more famous Moses, all the while being misled to think he is the prophet of God. The film also stars Laraine Newman, James Coco, Paul Sand, Jack Gilford, Dom DeLuise, John Houseman, Madeline Kahn, David Lander, Richard Pryor, and John Ritter.

The film was a moderate financial success, but critical reviews were overwhelmingly negative, regarding Wholly Moses! as an inferior imitation of Monty Python's The Life of Brian which featured a similar premise.

== Plot ==
Harvey and Zoey, two tourists travelling through Israel, discover an ancient scroll describing the life of Herschel, the man who was almost Moses. Herschel thinks he hears God commanding him to go to Egypt, but actually, he has overheard God giving His instructions to Moses at the burning bush. He tries to obey this command, but Moses always seems to be one step ahead of him. Several other biblical stories, such as Lot and his wife, David and Goliath, and the miracles of Jesus, are also parodied in this story of the life of a man trying to follow the path to God, but somehow always seeming to lose his way.

== Cast ==
- Dudley Moore as Harvey Orchid/Herschel
- Laraine Newman as Zoey/Zerelda
- James Coco as Hyssop
- Paul Sand as Angel Of The Lord
- Jack Gilford as Tailor
- Dom DeLuise as Shadrach
- John Houseman as Archangel
- Madeline Kahn as Sorceress
- David L. Lander as Beggar
- Richard Pryor as Pharaoh
- John Ritter as Devil
- Richard B. Shull as Jethro
- Tanya Boyd as Princess
- Ruth Manning as Landlady
- Andrea Martin as Zipporah
- Walker Edmiston as God (voice)

== Reception ==
The film received poor reviews.

Because of a production hiatus imposed on their television show by WTTW, Roger Ebert and Gene Siskel did not review the film on Sneak Previews. However, Ebert's print review in The Chicago Sun-Times was scathing. He wrote how comedy which could be successful successful in the short skits Weis might have directed on Saturday Night Live were less effective in a feature length film: "The movie's not funny on its own, and since movie audiences are scarcely going to be shocked by its mild but relentlessly repetitive irreverence, it all boils down to a very old joke [of] dressing people up in Biblical costume and having them speak in contemporary terms."

In another print review, for The Chicago Tribune, Siskel wrote how Wholly Moses! proves the truth of an addage: "Never go to a film with an exclamation point in its title" (The Beatles' "Help!" being a possible exception)", and noted it was similar in concept to Monty Python's Life of Brian but far less successful or humorous.

When the film was released on DVD, John Sinnott of DVD Talk echoed Siskel's commentary about how Wholly Moses! was clearly intended to capitalize on the success Life of Bryan. "But they got it all wrong. The jokes are bad, the setups lame and the laughs nonexistent. The script is so bad that I can't imagine how the project ever got green lighted."

In a guest review for Entertainment Weekly, Ty Burr of The Boston Globe gave the film a D grade, describing it as a "wholly unfunny comedy".

Five orthodox Jewish groups protested the film for mocking their religion.

Wholly Moses holds a 13% rating on Rotten Tomatoes based on eight reviews.
