= Jimi Hendrix (film) =

- Theatrical release poster
- Directed by: Joe Boyd; John Head; Gary Weis
- Edited by: Peter Colbert
- Distributed by: Warner Bros.
- Release date: December 21, 1973
- Running time: 98 minutes
- Country: United States
- Language: English

Jimi Hendrix is a 1973 rockumentary about Jimi Hendrix, directed and produced by Joe Boyd, John Head, and Gary Weis. The film contains concert footage of Hendrix from 1967 to 1970, including the Monterey Pop Festival, the 1970 Isle of Wight Festival, Woodstock, and a Berkeley concert. The film also includes interviews with Hendrix' contemporaries, family and friends. Those appearing in the film include Paul Caruso, Eric Clapton, Billy Cox, Alan Douglas, Germaine Greer, Hendrix' father, James A. "Al" Hendrix, Mick Jagger, Linda Keith, Eddie Kramer, Buddy Miles, Mitch Mitchell, Juggy Murray, Little Richard, Lou Reed, and Pete Townshend. Noel Redding refused to be interviewed as he had a pending lawsuit against the Hendrix Estate.

The film is also known as A Film About Jimi Hendrix. This title was used on the 2005 DVD cover and theatrical poster.

== Soundtrack ==
The soundtrack to the film features 12 songs as well as excerpts of interviews with Hendrix, his father Al Hendrix, Little Richard and others.

== Releases ==
The estate of Jimi Hendrix authorized the 1973 film to be re-released on video and DVD in 1999. An expanded DVD edition was issued in 2005, featuring a new documentary, From the Ukulele to the Strat, with more remembrances of Hendrix through interviews with family and friends, the making of "Dolly Dagger", with producer-engineer Eddie Kramer breaking down the studio mix of the song and unreleased archive footage of a performance of "Stone Free" from the July 4, 1970 Atlanta Pop Festival.
