= 21 and a Wake-Up =

2009 film directed by Chris McIntyre

- Directed by: Chris McIntyre
- Written by: Chris McIntyre
- Produced by: Nguyen Quy Phuong
- Starring: Amy Acker; JC Chasez; Danica McKellar; Faye Dunaway; Tom Sizemore; Ed Begley, Jr. Wes Studi; Andre Royo; Tim Thomerson; Ben Vereen; Lance Guest
- Cinematography: Stephen G. Shank
- Music by: Brooke Wentz
- Release date: October 30, 2009
- Country: United States
- Language: English

21 and a Wake-Up is a 2009 American war film directed and written by producer, director, and writer Chris McIntyre and starring Amy Acker, Danica McKellar, and Faye Dunaway.

The first American film about the Vietnam War allowed to shoot on location in Vietnam after the Vietnam War, it is based on a dozen true stories, most surrounding the final days of the 24th Evacuation Hospital, the last major Army hospital in the south to close as Americans abandoned Southeast Asia. 21 and a Wakeup has an all-star cast, and was written and directed by Chris McIntyre, a veteran of the US Marine Corps from 1967 through 1971, the most conflicted years of the war. The film focuses on real people McIntyre knew in the Marines, as well as experiences of Dr. Marvin Wayne, renowned and decorated physician at the 24th Evac in its final year. 21 and a Wakeup has been described as "an action packed drama that genuinely gets under the skin of its characters, showcasing the breathtaking beauty of Vietnam that most Americans have never seen."

== Premise ==
The film is based on real events, focusing on the lives of three young nurses, one of whom undertakes a treacherous journey up the Mekong River to Cambodia to save a very young Vietnamese-American girl before her life is destroyed during the American bombing of Cambodia.
