= Neil Simon's I Ought to Be in Pictures =

1982 film by Herbert Ross

- Theatrical release poster
- Directed by: Herbert Ross
- Screenplay by: Neil Simon
- Based on: I Ought to Be in Pictures; 1980 play by Neil Simon
- Produced by: Herbert Ross; Neil Simon
- Starring: Walter Matthau; Ann-Margret; Dinah Manoff
- Cinematography: David M. Walsh
- Edited by: Sidney Levin
- Music by: Marvin Hamlisch
- Production company: 20th Century Fox
- Distributed by: 20th Century Fox
- Release date: March 26, 1982
- Running time: 108 minutes
- Country: United States
- Language: English
- Budget: $10.5 million
- Box office: $6,968,359

I Ought to Be in Pictures (also promoted as Neil Simon's I Ought to Be in Pictures) is a 1982 American comedy drama film directed by Herbert Ross and based on Neil Simon's 1980 play. The film stars Walter Matthau, Ann-Margret and Dinah Manoff (reprising her Broadway role). Supporting actors include Lance Guest, Eugene Butler, David Faustino, Martin Ferrero and Michael Dudikoff.

The film was released on March 26, 1982, a year after the original Broadway play closed. It was filmed mainly in Los Angeles, California.

== Plot ==
Libby Tucker, a 19-year-old Brooklynite, is visiting her dead grandmother's grave at a New York cemetery, and reveals that she is moving to Hollywood to become an actress and locate her father, screenwriter Herbert Tucker. Libby takes a bus to Denver, then hitchhikes the rest of the way. She tries to call Herb, but gets nervous and hangs up.

The next morning, Libby goes to the house where Herb lives and meets his girlfriend Steffy Blondell, who invites Libby inside. After becoming acquainted and learning the reason why Libby is in town, Steffy leaves. Herb awakens to see Libby after a 16-year gap in their lives. The two chat about their pasts, and Libby tells Herb about the family he left in Brooklyn, including her younger brother Robbie. The two eventually begin arguing about Libby's goal of becoming an actress. Just as Steffy returns, Libby runs out of the house.

Herb tracks down Libby at a motel and eventually persuades her to come back to live at his house. They begin to get along, although the high-strung Libby also begins to realize that Herb is not nearly as successful in Hollywood as she had assumed. He is also on the verge of losing Steffy, who has been asked on a date by another man and has been waiting a long time for Herb to make a commitment to her.

A studio makeup artist, Steffy helps Libby by arranging for her to go to a drama school. Libby meets a young man there named Gordon, and they take part-time jobs together valet parking at a celebrity-filled private party. Libby comes home at 3 a.m. and tells Herb about putting business cards on car windshields that read, "Sunset Valet Parking. No party is too big or too small" on the front, and "Libby Tucker, New York-Trained Actress. No part is too big or too small" on the back, with her phone number. Herb tells her that there is no chance of this helping her to become an actress, but Libby clings to her optimistic dreams.

Libby gradually realizes that her trip's true purpose was to reestablish a relationship with her father, and she decides to return home. After packing, Libby makes a long-distance phone call, and Herbert talks to her mother for the first time in 16 years. He speaks with her brother Robbie as well. Libby leaves after taking Herb's picture for a keepsake. On the bus, she waves goodbye to Herb and Steffy, who appear to have worked out their differences.

== Cast ==
- Walter Matthau as Herbert Tucker
- Ann-Margret as Steffy Blondell
- Dinah Manoff as Libby Tucker
- Lance Guest as Gordon
- Larry Barton as Harry
- Eugene Butler as Marty
- Michael Dudikoff as Boy on bus
- David Faustino as Martin
- Martin Ferrero as Monte Del Rey
- Wayne Woodson as Baseball Fan

== Soundtrack ==
"One Hello" was performed at the end of the movie by Randy Crawford and written by Carole Bayer Sager and Marvin Hamlisch. An instrumental version of "One Hello" is heard at various points in the movie as well. Hamlisch composed the main music for the movie. Just nine months before the movie's premiere, "One Hello" was released on June 3, 1981, as Randy Crawford's single and it appeared in the album Windsong.

== Production ==
I Ought to Be in Pictures was originally produced for Broadway in 1980, and the original cast starred Ron Leibman as Herbert Tucker, Joyce Van Patten as Steffy and Dinah Manoff as Libby Tucker. Manoff was the only cast member to reprise her role in the movie. For the film version, most of the script from the play is the same, with more settings, such as Dodger Stadium and the Hollywood Park Racetrack. The house used in the film was at 1761 Vista Del Mar Avenue, in Hollywood.

== Reception ==
The film had an opening weekend gross of $2,170,397 in the United States. It would go on to make $6,968,359 in six weeks.

On the review aggregator website Rotten Tomatoes, 80% of 5 critics' reviews are positive, with an average rating of 7.4/10.

Gene Siskel selected the film as one of the worst of the year in a 1982 episode of Sneak Previews. Siskel's print review for the Chicago Tribune gave it 1½ stars out of 4, and called it "another exercise in annoying manipulation from the one man who I wish wasn't in pictures".

Vincent Canby of The New York Times wrote, "I found it unbearable. Being so mechanical, so slick and so sentimental, it is, at heart, heartless, and though it has the hyped up-pacing one associates with Broadway, it seems longer than 'Nicholas Nickelby'."

Kevin Thomas of the Los Angeles Times called the film "a largely satisfying reunion of Neil Simon, Walter Matthau and director Herbert Ross", adding, "The writing, the direction and the playing of Matthau and Ann-Margret represent the most effective way for Simon to get serious and still stay funny."

Variety called it "a moving family drama, peppered with the author's patented gag lines and notable for sock performances by Dinah Manoff and Walter Matthau".

David Ansen of Newsweek wrote, "Ross and Simon co-produced the movie, and they obviously think they're on the trail of psychological realism when in fact they're peddling dull, sentimental bromides. The payoff for the audience is a couple of supposedly heart warming moments, but it's hard to have a warm heart when your mind is sound asleep."

== Home media ==
I Ought to Be in Pictures was released on VHS by CBS Fox Video on December 1, 1982. It was released on DVD on March 31, 2015.
