= I'm Losing You (film) =

- Theatrical release poster
- Directed by: Bruce Wagner
- Screenplay by: Bruce Wagner
- Based on: I'm Losing You by Bruce Wagner
- Produced by: Pamela Koffler; Christine Vachon
- Starring: Rosanna Arquette; Frank Langella; Andrew McCarthy; Elizabeth Perkins
- Cinematography: Rob Sweeney
- Edited by: Janice Hampton
- Music by: Daniel Catán
- Production companies: Killer Films; Lions Gate Films
- Distributed by: Lions Gate Films
- Release dates: September 17, 1998 (TIFF); July 16, 1999 (United States)
- Running time: 102 minutes
- Country: United States
- Language: English
- Box office: $13,996

I'm Losing You is a 1998 American drama film directed by Bruce Wagner and adapted from his 1996 novel of the same name. The film stars Rosanna Arquette, Frank Langella, Andrew McCarthy, and Elizabeth Perkins. I'm Losing You film premiered at the Toronto International Film Festival on September 17, 1998 and received a limited theatrical release in the United States on July 16, 1999. The title of the film refers not only to the loss of life and love, but to a phrase used by most Angelenos while talking on cellular phones.

== Plot ==
The film centers on the wealthy, dysfunctional Krohn family of Los Angeles. On the verge of his 60th birthday, patriarch and TV producer Perry Krohn is diagnosed with inoperable cancer and is told he has only months left to live. He delays telling his thirtysomething children, has-been actor Bertie and adopted daughter Rachel.

Bertie, who is promoting a scheme to short-sell life insurance policies to AIDS patients, is a devoted single parent to his daughter Tiffany, but constantly worries about the erratic behavior of Lidia, his drug-addicted ex-wife. Rachel, who works at an auction house, becomes drawn into Judaism as a means of coping with a spirituality crisis. She also makes an alarming discovery about her biological parents.

At a party, Bertie meets HIV-positive activist Aubrey, with whom he becomes entangled in a reckless sexual relationship. Perry also embarks on an affair, one he believes to be his last, with Mona Deware, an English actress appearing in his wildly successful Star Trek–like series, "Blue Matrix."

== Cast ==
- Rosanna Arquette as Rachel Krohn
- Frank Langella as Perry Needham Krohn
- Andrew McCarthy as Bertie Krohn
- Elizabeth Perkins as Aubrey Wicker
- Aria Noelle Curzon as Tiffany "Tiffi" Krohn
- Salome Jens as Diantha Krohn
- Don McManus as Jake Horowitz
- Gina Gershon as Lidia
- Buck Henry as Phillip Dagrom
- Amanda Donohoe as Mona Deware
- Norman Reedus as Toby
- Lisa Edelstein as Diantha's Patient
- Laraine Newman as Casting Director
- Ed Begley, Jr. as Zev

== Reception ==
Review aggregator Rotten Tomatoes gives the film a 40% approval rating based on five reviews, with an average rating of 4.85/10.

Critics noted the film's "certain visual elegance and tonal control", but said its grim subject matter would only be appealing to a specialized audience. Janet Maslin of The New York Times noted that the film pares down much of the material from the novel and said it doesn't "quite hang together", but "it does capture the black humor and mournful angst at the heart of the material". She concluded, "Wagner successfully echoes his book's bleak resonance, but his straightforward ability with a camera is no match for what he can do on the page. He does give the film a cool, calculated look that preserves its discreet mournfulness and saves it from emotional overkill."

Nathan Rabin of The A.V. Club wrote, "Joyless, morbid, and frequently over-written (at one point Arquette informs an acquaintance that she 'was into Coleridge and the Cabala before either were trendy'), I'm Losing You seems intent on rubbing its viewers' faces in the pain and degradation of contemporary life. Equal parts bleak soap opera, pitch-black comedy, and morose meditation on the nature of death, I'm Losing You is as compelling as it is repugnant and sorrowful."

Producer Pamela Koffler was awarded with the Producers Award at the 15th Independent Spirit Awards for her work on the film.
