= Happy Birthday Oscar Wilde =

2004 American television film

- Written by: Noreen Doody; Frank McGuinness
- Directed by: Bill Hughes
- Theme music composer: Gavin Friday; Maurice Seezer; Ronan Johnston
- Country of origin: United States
- Original language: English

Production
- Producers: Bill Hughes; Bernadine Carraher
- Running time: 110 min.

Original release
- Release: 2004

Happy Birthday Oscar Wilde is a 2004 documentary film that celebrates Oscar Wilde's 150th birthday. Over 150 of his well-known quotes are delivered by 150 of stars in stage, screen and music.

== Cast ==
- Simon Williams
- Jillian Armenante
- Edward Asner
- Helen Baxendale
- Stephanie Beacham
- Emma Bolger
- Sarah Bolger
- Bono
- Barry Bostwick
- Dawn Bradfield
- Barbara Brennan
- Roscoe Lee Browne
- Melanie Brown
- Jean Butler
- Gerard Byrne
- Jonathan Byrne
- Bobby Cannavale
- Gary Carter
- Anna Chancellor
- Rob Clark
- James Cromwell
- Tyne Daly
- Bob Dishy
- Alice Dodd
- Alison Doody
- Roma Downey
- Keith Duffy
- Adrian Dunbar
- Colin Dunne
- Hector Elizondo
- Michael Emerson
- Kathryn Erbe
- Kevin Fabian
- Gavin Friday
- Philip Glass
- Ricky Paull Goldin
- Mikey Graham
- Lee Grant
- Tom Hickey
- William Hootkins
- Ciara Hughes
- David Henry Hwang
- Allison Janney
- Tina Kellegher
- Brian Kennedy
- Emma Kennedy
- Maria Doyle Kennedy
- Mimi Kennedy
- Pat Kinevane
- Mark Lambert
- Annie Lennox
- Dinah Manoff
- Julianna Margulies
- Jefferson Mays
- Frank McCourt
- Frank McGuinness
- Tom McGurk
- Charlotte Moore
- Larry Mullen, Jr.
- Bryan Murray
- Liam Neeson
- Brían F. O'Byrne
- Hugh O'Conor
- Brian O'Driscoll
- Deirdre O'Kane
- Milo O'Shea
- Kitty O'Sullivan
- Nathaniel Parker
- Estelle Parsons
- Rosie Perez
- Sue Perkins
- Tonya Pinkins
- Anita Reeves
- Joan Rivers
- Owen Roe
- Mitchell Ryan
- Richard Schiff
- Nick Seymour
- Martin Sheen
- Michael Sheen
- Jim Sheridan
- Bill Shipsey
- Nina Siemaszko
- Alan Stanford
- Eric Stoltz
- Kim Thomson
- Lily Tomlin
- Marty Whelan
- Olivia Williams
- Don Wycherley
- Anthony Zerbe
