= Anita Reeves =

Irish stage and film actress

- Born: 24 June 1948; Dublin, Ireland
- Died: 7 July 2016 (aged 68); Dublin, Ireland
- Education: St Louis High School, Rathmines
- Occupations: Film and stage actress
- Spouse: Julian Erskine (m. 2000–2016)
- Children: 2

Anita Reeves (24 June 1948 – 7 July 2016) was an Irish stage and film actress.

== Early life ==
Born in South Dublin, Ireland, the youngest daughter of Jack Reeves and his wife, Kay. Reeves grew up on Sundrive Road in Dublin 12, where her father Jack was a sergeant at the Garda station on the same road. She was educated at St Louis High School, Rathmines and trained at night as an actor for four years at the Brendan Smith Academy in Dublin. As a child, Reeves's parents would take her to see plays and pantomimes in Dún Laoghaire. She played an extra in a play during a festival, then quit her steady job at the complaints department of a laundry to be an assistant stage manager.

She performed twice with Eamon Morrissey at the Gaiety Theatre in Dublin. She considered Gaiety regular Maureen Potter an early influence in teaching her to connect with audiences.

== Career ==
Reeves had several Irish film roles, including Neil Jordan's first film, Angel (1982), and his adaptation of The Butcher Boy (1997), Mike Newell's Into the West (1992) and Lenny Abrahamson's Adam & Paul (2004). However, the bulk of her career was spent on stage.

Major performances include Les Miserables at the Point Theatre as Madame Thénardier, and Mrs Lovett in the Gate Theatre's 2007 production of Sweeney Todd. She was in the original production of Brian Friel's classic Dancing at Lughnasa as Maggie in 1990, which earned her a Laurence Olivier Award nomination for the Best Actress in a Supporting Role, when Patrick Mason's celebrated production went to the London West End. When the production transferred to Broadway, however, she chose to stay at home.

She toured for Elaine Murphy's play, Little Gem, as Kay, which debuted in Dublin in 2008. She twice played Juno in Juno and the Paycock, first in Dublin in 1988 and again in Minneapolis in 2015, both for director Joe Dowling.

Her Minneapolis appearance was her final stage performance, directed by Dowling in his farewell production in charge of the Guthrie theatre in mid-2015. She had, said Dowling, grown even greater in the role, bringing an added elegance and finesse to the spirited mouthpiece of the Dublin tenements during the nationalist schisms of 1922.

== Personal life ==
Reeves was first married to Barry McGovern but separated after five months. She subsequently married Julian Erskine, executive producer for Riverdance, whom she met when she was 24 and he 17, but didn't marry until 2000. They had two children. Reeves died on 7 July 2016 in Dublin, following a short battle with cancer, at the age of 68.

== Filmography ==
=== Film ===
Year	Title	Role	Notes
1982	Angel	Beth	
1986	The Ballroom of Romance	Cat Bolger	
1990	Fools of Fortune	Aunt Pansy	
1991	The Miracle	Ballroom Stager	
1992	Into the West	Mrs. Murphy	
1997	The Butcher Boy	Mrs. Coyle	
1998	Talk of Angels	Harty	
2004	Adam & Paul	Matthew's Ma	
2008	Alarm	Jessie	

=== Television ===
Year	Title	Role	Notes
1968	Cradle Song	Maria Jesus	Television film
1971	The Sinners	Kitty Twomey	Episode: "The Little Mother"
1973	2nd House	Ginger Mooney in Clay	Episode: "An Anthology for November"
1982	The Year of the French	Eliza Broome	Episode #1.1
1983	One of Ourselves	Mrs. Dwyer	Television film
1985	The Irish R.M.	Mrs. Flynn	Episode: "In the Curranhilty Country"
1994	Scarlett	Maureen O'Hara	Episode #1.2
1998	The American	The Duchess	Television film
2004	Happy Birthday Oscar Wilde	—N/a	Television film
