= Maid for Each Other =

- Genre: Comedy; Crime
- Screenplay by: Rob Gilmer
- Story by: Dinah Manoff; Les Alexander; Don Enright; Andrew Smith
- Directed by: Paul Schneider
- Starring: Nell Carter; Dinah Manoff; Joyce Van Patten; Garrett Morris; Robert Costanzo
- Theme music composer: Johnny Harris
- Country of origin: United States
- Original language: English

Production
- Executive producers: Don Enright; Les Alexander; Dinah Manoff
- Producers: Don Enright; Les Alexander
- Cinematography: David Plenn
- Editor: Mark Westmore
- Running time: 93 min.
- Production companies: Alexander/Enright & Associates; Hearst Entertainment Productions

Original release
- Network: NBC
- Release: January 13, 1992

Maid for Each Other is a 1992 television film starring Nell Carter and Dinah Manoff. The film was written by Manoff, Robb Gilmer, Les Alexander, Don Enright and Andrew Smith, produced by Enright and Alexander, and directed by Paul Schneider. It has been characterized as a buddy movie.

== Background ==
Dinah Manoff had conceived of the film earlier in the 1980s as a potential pilot episode, and was able to produce it after being cast in the series Empty Nest.

== Plot ==
Tibby Bloom (Dinah Manoff), a recently widowed Beverly Hills socialite, is left broke and homeless. Seeking refuge at her mother's home, she gains a job as a maid for a Jasmine Jones (Nell Carter), a flamboyant jazz singer. Jones is holding a large party for several important music-industry contacts in advance of her comeback performance at a club in town. However, several of her past maids have quit, and Bloom, who has never worked as a maid, is taken well out of her comfort zone.

The two women form an unlikely bond but soon find themselves neck deep in mayhem and trouble when Bloom finds the body of Jones' ex-husband in a closet. They must keep the police off their trail, prevent Jones from becoming the suspect, and solve the murder.

== Soundtrack ==
The song "Bad Case of You," which Nell Carter performs in the movie, is not available in any other form apart from in this movie.

== Critical reception ==
The film received mixed reviews. The Los Angeles Times, while writing that the actors had good chemistry, criticized the "hoary plotting." The Chicago Tribune compared it, somewhat unfavorably, to Ally Sheedy vehicle Maid to Order, but noted the film's potential as a longer series.
