= The Cover Girl and the Cop =

American television film

- Also known as: Beauty & Denise
- Genre: Comedy
- Teleplay by: Michael Norell
- Story by: Les Alexander; Steve Ditlea; Don Enright; Michael Norell; James Norell
- Directed by: Neal Israel
- Starring: Julia Duffy; Dinah Manoff; David Carradine; John Karlen; Arthur Taxier; Jonathan Frakes
- Music by: Sylvester Levay
- Country of origin: United States
- Original language: English

Production
- Producers: Les Alexander; Don Enright
- Cinematography: Timothy Suhrstedt
- Editor: Tom Walls
- Running time: 93 minutes
- Production companies: Barry & Enright Productions; Consolidated Distribution

Original release
- Network: NBC
- Release: January 16, 1989

The Cover Girl and the Cop, released on video as Beauty & Denise, is a 1989 American comedy television film directed by Neal Israel, written by Michael Norell, and starring Julia Duffy, Dinah Manoff, and David Carradine. It aired on NBC on January 16, 1989.

== Premise ==
In Washington, D.C., ditzy model-actress Jackie Flanders witnesses the murder of a powerful figure connected to the President. Claiming to the police that she has a stalker, she is protected by tough, streetwise cop Denise Danielovitch.

== Cast ==
- Julia Duffy as Jackie Flanders
- Dinah Manoff as Denise Danielovitch
- David Carradine as Slade
- John Karlen as Lt. Wingo
- Arthur Taxier as Capt. Pashnick
- Jonathan Frakes as Joshua Boyleston
- Blair Underwood as Horace Bouchet
- Whip Hubley as Lester Sweazy
- Robert Picardo as Denise's date

== Production ==
Duffy at the time was best known for Newhart. Her role in the film was similar and she said, "It's simply a case of me playing different parts, but if people think they're the same (because of the strength of the Stephanie portrayal), there's nothing I can do about it. NBC has been pretty good about what they've offered me. It's really been a wide variety. Unfortunately, the ones for which I've been available don't mark that much of a departure, but that's just coincidence... I know that title sounds really fluffy, but (Manoff) plays a really terrific person who hides her light under a bushel, by dressing sloppily and talking tough. She thinks that men aren't attracted to her, and she just has no social life. I knew if that character were played by a really legitimate actress who was good at comedy as well as drama, the movie would have a real foundation."
