= Gary Weis =

American film and television director

- Born: 1942 or 1943 (age 83–84); United States
- Occupations: Director; producer
- Years active: 1973–2004
- Known for: Saturday Night Live film shorts

Gary Weis (b. 1942 or 1943) is an American filmmaker.

He is known for creating multiple short films that aired on Saturday Night Live in the late 1970s. He co-produced and provided visual effects for the documentary Jimi Hendrix (1973); he co-directed the Beatlemania spoof All You Need Is Cash (1978) with the film's star, Eric Idle; he directed the comedy film Diary of a Young Comic (1979) starring Richard Lewis, as well as 80 Blocks from Tiffany's (1979), a documentary about gangs in the South Bronx.

He also directed several music videos in the 1980s, including the video for Paul Simon's single "You Can Call Me Al" and for George Harrison's version of the song "Got My Mind Set on You".

== Career ==
Weis worked as a cameraman for the 1970 Rolling Stones tour documentary Gimme Shelter that culminated with footage of the infamous Altamont Free Concert. Weis told the Los Angeles Times that it was "the most frightening workday I've ever had," although he had left for the day by the time The Rolling Stones took the stage.

Weis co-produced the 1973 documentary Jimi Hendrix along with Joe Boyd and John Head. Weis was also in charge of the film's visuals. He told the San Francisco Examiner that he was not a particular fan of the musician prior to the creation of Jimi Hendrix, but gained an appreciation for the musician through his work on the film. Weis was initially approached by Boyd–who was the music director for Warner Bros. Pictures at the time–about assisting with the film.

Weis directed of over 45 short films for Saturday Night Live (SNL) that aired in 1975 and 1977. Weis started as an assistant director then took over the position of primary director of the show's film shorts after Albert Brooks' departure from the show in 1976. NBC subsequently commissioned Weis to direct some full-length films to be aired during SNL's timeslot when the show was on summer hiatus. The first of such films was All You Need Is Cash (1978), a Beatlemania mockumentary, which Weis produced and co-directed with Eric Idle, who also starred in the film. Next came Diary of a Young Comic (1979), a satirical take on Hollywood starring comedian Richard Lewis. The script was written by Richard Lewis and Bennett Tramer, based on a story originally conceived by Weis. Weis decided to put Lewis in the film after watching him perform at The Comedy Store in Los Angeles. Weis also directed Steve Martin's comedy special A Wild and Crazy Guy that aired on NBC in 1978.

Later that summer, Weis filmed the documentary 80 Blocks from Tiffany's, which documented the lives of gang members in the South Bronx, a neighborhood that was suffering from a high level of crime and urban decay at the time. While the documentary was filmed for NBC, it did not make it to air. In a 2010 interview with BlackBook magazine, Weis said that NBC was reticent to air the film because of a recent legal case brought against ABC related to a movie made by their entertainment division of the news. "They said it would have been fine if the news division [of NBC] had done it," Weis explained. Instead, 80 Blocks from Tiffany's premiered at the Los Angeles Film Festival in 1980 and was released to home video in 1985 by Pacific Arts Entertainment. The VHS version of the film increased in demand as the film gained cult status, and the film was re-released to DVD in 2010.

Weis directed the 1980 comedy film Wholly Moses! starring Dudley Moore. It marked Weis's first direction of a feature film. This was followed by Young Lust, a comedy film starring Fran Drescher, and Action Family, a Cinemax TV spoof starring Chris Elliott.

Weis directed music videos in the 1980s, including videos for The Bangles singles "Walk Like an Egyptian" and "Walking Down Your Street", the Howard Jones single "Everlasting Love" and the 38 Special single "Back Where You Belong", the latter of which was shot in the style of a Hill Street Blues spoof. His most notable videos were for Paul Simon's single "You Can Call Me Al", which featured Chevy Chase lip-syncing to the song with an unimpressed Simon sitting next to him, as well as the video for George Harrison's version of the song "Got My Mind Set on You", in which Harrison is seen sitting in an armchair in a study where inanimate objects come to life and move along to the rhythm of the song.

== Personal life ==
Weis was married to Kathryn Ireland, a star of the Bravo reality-television series Million Dollar Decorators. Together, the two "conceptualized" music videos for Toto's "Without Your Love," The Bangles' "Walk Like an Egyptian", Paul Simon's "You Can Call Me Al" and others. They have since divorced.

== Filmography ==
Year	Film	Notes
1973	Jimi Hendrix	Co-producer and visual director
1976–1977	Saturday Night Live (TV film shorts)	Director
1976	The Beach Boys: It's OK! (TV special)	Director
1978	All You Need Is Cash (TV movie)	Director
1978	Steve Martin: A Wild and Crazy Guy (TV special)	Director
1978	Things We Did Last Summer (TV special)	Director
1979	Diary of a Young Comic (TV movie)	Director
1979	80 Blocks from Tiffany's	Director
1980	Wholly Moses!	Director
1984	Young Lust	Director
1986	Action Family (TV movie)	Director
