= Two and a Half Men season 1 =

Two and a Half Men
- Season 1
- DVD cover art
- Showrunner: Lee Aronsohn
- Starring: Charlie Sheen; Jon Cryer; Angus T. Jones; Marin Hinkle; Melanie Lynskey; Holland Taylor
- No. of episodes: 24

Release
- Original network: CBS
- Original release: September 22, 2003 – May 24, 2004

Season chronology
- Next → Season 2

The first season of the American television sitcom Two and a Half Men aired on CBS from September 22, 2003 to May 24, 2004.

The pilot received positive reviews and an Artios Award nomination for Best Casting for TV, Comedy Pilot (Nikki Valko, Ken Miller). In the week of October 1, 2003, the series was ranked 7th highest in the top ten shows of the week according to Nielsen Research, with an average 12.1/18 rating. The series was renewed for a second season in 2004.

The DVD set was released on Region 2 on September 12, 2005, and on Region 1 on September 11, 2007. Its bonus material included bloopers, outtakes, a backstage tour with Angus T. Jones, and a behind-the-scenes special, with the cast and crew of the show.

== Production ==
The series is set in a large oceanfront home in Malibu, California, although most of the series is filmed in Burbank, California at the Warner Brothers Burbank Studios at 4000 Warner Boulevard. The show features Charlie Sheen as Charlie Harper, Jon Cryer as Alan Harper, Angus T. Jones as Jake Harper, Holland Taylor as Evelyn Harper, Melanie Lynskey as Rose and Marin Hinkle as Judith Harper. Conchata Ferrell as Berta had a recurring role in the first season, but became a main cast member in the following season. The song, "Manly Men", was written by the show's creator Chuck Lorre, and the signature opening intro features the theme being lip-synced by the show's three main actors, but they are not the original performers. One of the performers is Elizabeth Daily.

== Casting ==
Originally, actress Blythe Danner was cast to portray Evelyn Harper, but when she started to suggest changes to scenes, she was dismissed by the producers; one of the bosses commented: "Blythe is a wonderful actress who was put in a part that was not a good fit for her."

"Most Chicks Won't Eat Veal", the original pilot, with Danner as Evelyn, remained unaired. According to the Internet Movie Database, Sheen was cast because the creators saw him on Spin City, in which he also portrayed a charming bachelor afraid of commitment. The show was becoming a huge hit, and breathed much needed life into Sheen's fading career. Before their reunion on the series, Cryer and Sheen had both appeared in the comedy Hot Shots!. Other connections between the actors are that Taylor, Sheen and Cryer have each appeared in a John Hughes film (Sheen in Ferris Bueller's Day Off, Cryer in Pretty in Pink and Taylor in She's Having a Baby), and that Jones, Ferrell, Taylor and Hinkle have all made guest appearances in ER. Additionally, Sheen and Cryer each made guest appearances on the animated series Family Guy.

== Cast ==
=== Main ===
- Charlie Sheen as Charlie Harper, a cheeky-chappy, jingle-writing bachelor whose life is dramatically changed when his brother moves in after separating from his wife, with his son visiting on the weekends. Charlie has a bad relationship with his mother, and has sex with an endless string of women.
- Jon Cryer as Dr. Alan Harper, Charlie's younger brother. A chiropractor who has just separated from his wife of twelve years, Judith Harper, and is the father of Jake, who has a big appetite. Initially, Alan still loves Judith and does everything he can to be reconciled, but eventually they are divorced, with Alan paying alimony and child support.
- Angus T. Jones as Jake Harper, the son of Alan and Judith Harper, who is upset by the separation of his parents. Jake is considerably sharp-witted for a boy his age, but his personality drastically changes as the series progresses.
- Marin Hinkle as Judith Harper, the ex-wife of Alan Harper and mother of Jake Harper. Judith and Alan had just separated in the pilot episode, when she told him that she is gay, but she was later seen with other men and also briefly reunited with Alan. Alan pays Judith alimony and child support, but it is never mentioned whether she has ever held a job when living with Alan or afterwards.
- Melanie Lynskey as Rose, the boundary-challenged stalker of Charlie Harper. They had a one-night stand and she will not let him forget it, claiming that she loves him. Regardless, the two eventually become close friends. Rose has a close friendship with Jake and eventually forms friendships with Alan, Berta, and Evelyn.
- Holland Taylor as Evelyn Harper, the four-time divorced mother of Charlie and Alan Harper. Evelyn has her own real estate agency, is sexually rapacious and has a strained relationship with her sons and grandson. Evelyn loathes Judith and Berta.

=== Recurring ===
- Conchata Ferrell as Berta, Charlie's heavyset, acid-tongued housekeeper. She initially hates the presence of Alan and Jake, but soon forms a close relationship with both of them.
- Jane Lynch as Dr. Linda Freedman

=== Guests ===
- Kristin Bauer as Laura
- Jennifer Taylor as Suzanne
- Liz Vassey as Kate
- Christine Dunford as Gloria
- Tricia O'Kelley as Brooke
- Eric Allan Kramer as Bill
- Krista Allen as Olivia Pearson
- Kristin Dattilo as Cindy
- Myndy Crist as Wendy
- Denise Richards as Lisa
- Megan Fox as Prudence
- Richard Lewis as Stan
- Jenna Elfman as Frankie
- Juliette Goglia as Joanie
- Chris O'Donnell as Bill Shrader
- Teri Hatcher as Liz
- Heather Locklear as Laura Lang
- Alana de la Garza as Crystal
- Stacey Travis as Linda
- Cheryl White as Ruth
- Amy Farrington as Kathleen
- Yvette Nicole Brown as Mandy
- Terry Rhoads as Dr. Andrew Sperlock

== Awards and nominations ==
Two and a Half Men was nominated for three Primetime Emmy Awards but lost all three of them. The show won the People's Choice Awards for Best New Comedy Series and was nominated for two Young Artist Awards for Best Family Television Series (Comedy or Drama) and for Best Performance in a TV series (Comedy or Drama) and won one for Angus T. Jones for playing Jake Harper. It won the ASCAP award for Top TV Series and it also won BMI Film and TV Award for Best Music in TV. It was also nominated Casting Society of America for the casting of a series.

== Episodes ==
No. overall	No. in season	Title	Directed by	Written by	Original release date	Prod. code	U.S. viewers (millions)
1	1	"Pilot"	James Burrows	Chuck Lorre & Lee Aronsohn	September 22, 2003	475215	18.44
Carefree bachelor Charlie Harper (Charlie Sheen)'s life is disrupted when his brother Alan (Jon Cryer) and ten-year-old nephew Jake (Angus T. Jones) move in with him when Alan's wife Judith (Marin Hinkle) kicks him out after 12 years of marriage. After returning from a meal in which he failed to reconcile with his wife, Alan finds Charlie to be an irresponsible caretaker for Jake, with Charlie allowing him to join Charlie's poker game with friends, so he takes Jake to move in with his mother, Evelyn (Holland Taylor) instead. But when Alan learns that Jake likes Charlie more, he decides to stay with him. Meanwhile, one of Charlie's one-night stands, his neighbor Rose (Melanie Lynskey), is stalking him. Alan lets her into the house after she tells him that she is Charlie's housekeeper. Later, Charlie tells him she often glues all his kitchen cabinets shut. Title quotation from: Charlie, after Alan says that Judith is gay and that they ate veal at the restaurant. ("Most Chicks Won't Eat Veal" was the name of the original pilot episode with Blythe Danner as Evelyn instead of Holland Taylor, and the quotation remained.)
2	2	"Big Flappy Bastards"	Andy Ackerman	Story by : Chuck Lorre & Lee Aronsohn; Teleplay by : Eddie Gorodetsky & Jeff Abugov	September 29, 2003	176802	16.18
When Jake feeds the seagulls after Charlie (who is afraid of seagulls) has warned him not to, many gulls gather in Jake's room, causing tension between Jake and Charlie. Alan tells Charlie this is what parenting can be like. Meanwhile, Alan again tries to win Judith back by repeatedly going over to her house to fix things; after Alan snaps and tells her that he has had enough and that she is free, the two end up sharing a kiss. Later, Judith confirms that their marriage is over. Title quotation from: Charlie, describing the seagulls as he prepares to clear them out of Jake's room.
3	3	"Go East on Sunset Until You Reach the Gates of Hell"	Andy Ackerman	Story by : Chuck Lorre & Don Foster; Teleplay by : Mark Roberts & Lee Aronsohn	October 6, 2003	176803	14.82
Jake brings his pet guinea pig to Charlie's house. Later, Jake becomes ill and wants to go back to his mother's, which upsets Alan. To make matters worse, the guinea pig suddenly dies, which Alan sees as symbolic of the way his life is falling apart. He gets depressed and has a drink with Charlie. After their drinking binge, they go to confront their mother for the way she made them as they are, but they chicken out. Next morning, they discover that their drunken conversation during the cab journey home was taped and they had agreed for it to be put on a TV show. Title quotation from: Charlie, giving directions to the taxi driver for the location of Evelyn's house.
4	4	"If I Can't Write My Chocolate Song, I'm Going to Take a Nap"	Andy Ackerman	Story by : Chuck Lorre & Lee Aronsohn; Teleplay by : Susan Beavers & Don Foster	October 13, 2003	176801	14.73
Charlie's housekeeper Berta (Conchata Ferrell) quits because Alan keeps criticizing her housekeeping skills. Alan is willing to take over her duties, but Charlie misses all the little things she did for him, like making his coffee taste "Christmassy". So Alan tries to make peace with Berta by finding her and attempting to bring her back. Meanwhile, Charlie tries to get Jake ready for his mother who is coming to pick him up – but Jake is more interested in fixing his bike's chain. Title quotation from: Charlie, after losing inspiration because his piano smelled like lemon Pledge.
5	5	"The Last Thing You Want Is to Wind Up with a Hump"	Andy Ackerman	Story by : Chuck Lorre & Lee Aronsohn; Teleplay by : Eddie Gorodetsky & Jeff Abugov	October 20, 2003	176805	15.24
Despite arriving home hungover and exhausted after spending a wild night in Las Vegas, Charlie keeps his promise that he made to Jake about attending his soccer game. During the game, Charlie hits it off with an unattached soccer mom named Kate. Alan sets up a meeting with Gloria, another of the soccer moms, to write a soccer newsletter, but Gloria has other intentions for the evening, for which Alan is unprepared. Title quotation from: Alan, giving one of the soccer moms a back massage.
6	6	"Did You Check with the Captain of the Flying Monkeys?"	Andy Ackerman	Story by : Chuck Lorre & Lee Aronsohn; Teleplay by : Susan Beavers & Don Foster	October 27, 2003	176804	15.82
Evelyn has met a new man who she thinks is "the one", but when she arranges for Charlie and Alan to meet him, it turns out that his daughter was previously dated by Charlie who then ignored her calls, and she makes a big scene. Later, Charlie and Alan find out that Evelyn has been dumped by "the one", not because of what Charlie did, but because he left her for a younger woman. This has made Evelyn deeply depressed, so Charlie reluctantly invites her to stay at his place until she recovers. Alan and Charlie encourage her to do her thing performing songs in front of them and Jake, with Charlie on the piano. Charlie finally fixes things with a long and deep conversation with his mother. Title quotation from: Charlie, offering up a suggestion when Alan announces their mother is missing.
7	7	"If They Do Go Either Way, They're Usually Fake"	Andy Ackerman	Story by : Chuck Lorre & Don Foster; Teleplay by : Mark Roberts & Lee Aronsohn	November 3, 2003	176806	16.02
Judith gets worried when Jake draws the tattooed buttocks of a female surfer friend of Charlie's, who walks around his place half naked. Charlie wants to sleep with her but she only visits his place to shower after surfing. Alan feels concern for Judith when she befriends the surfer girl. Jake begins to learn from Charlie about fake and real boobs and doesn't stop comparing them both. Title quotation from: Charlie, describing breast implants to Jake while the two watch bikini surfers on the beach.
8	8	"Twenty-Five Little Pre-pubers Without a Snootful"	Chuck Lorre	Story by : Chuck Lorre & Lee Aronsohn; Teleplay by : Eddie Gorodetsky & Jeff Abugov	November 10, 2003	176808	15.82
Alan tricks Charlie into joining him and Judith in leading Jake and his classmates in the school's annual music show, which Charlie does not enjoy. Meanwhile, Alan discovers that Judith has filed for a divorce and is not happy. When he and Judith talk about the divorce, Charlie takes over the play; he soon enjoys the ride when the children learn he is the writer who wrote their favorite jingles. The children choose Charlie's songs instead of Alan and Judith's and confuse the parents attending the show, who'd thought that the show would have music sticking closer to traditional themes. Title quotation from: Charlie, on why he is petrified of facing the children in Jake's school class.
9	9	"Phase One, Complete"	Andy Ackerman	Story by : Chuck Lorre & Lee Aronsohn; Teleplay by : Susan Beavers & Don Foster	November 17, 2003	176807	15.98
Charlie wants to dump a female friend that Jake has grown close to, while Alan and Rose bond over a game of Scrabble. It is revealed that Rose bonded with Alan to get closer to Charlie. Jake gets mad at Charlie for letting his girlfriend dump her. Title quotation from: Rose, when Charlie says he believes that she and Alan are just friends.
10	10	"Merry Thanksgiving"	Jay Sandrich	Chuck Lorre & Lee Aronsohn	November 24, 2003	176809	17.14
In an attempt to prove that he is a family man, Charlie invites his ex-girlfriend, Lisa (Denise Richards), over for Thanksgiving dinner. He must also convince his family to join him as well, which also includes Judith and her parents. The atmosphere becomes awkward after Evelyn announces to Judith's parents that their daughter is gay; Judith becomes annoyed when her mother takes Alan's side in their divorce. Title quotation from: Charlie, greeting Lisa when she arrives for Thanksgiving.
11	11	"Alan Harper, Frontier Chiropractor"	Robert Berlinger	Story by : Chuck Lorre & Don Foster; Teleplay by : Lee Aronsohn & Mark Roberts	December 15, 2003	176810	14.77
While at the movies, the brothers accidentally bump into Judith and her new boyfriend, who turns out to be Jake's soccer coach. Seeing that Judith has changed her look, and hearing that Jake doesn't think Alan is as cool as Judith, Alan decides that if he wants to get back into the dating scene he's going to have to change his look as well, and asks for Charlie's assistance. The new look earns him several compliments, but he gives up at the end, confessing to Charlie that he is afraid of it. Title quotation from: The list of superhero names that Alan gives to himself while he and Charlie are at the bar. While not saying the quote, it is implied that this will be his new superhero name after his "transformation."
12	12	"Camel Filters and Pheromones"	Robert Berlinger	Story by : Chuck Lorre & Lee Aronsohn; Teleplay by : Susan Beavers & Mark Roberts	January 5, 2004	176813	16.75
When Berta brings her granddaughter, 16-year-old Prudence (Megan Fox), to work with her, the two men find themselves a little preoccupied with watching the scantily clothed Prudence, and Jake gets a big crush on her. Judith arrives to collect Jake, but Charlie and Alan manage to prevent her seeing Prudence, who later shows up with her new fiancee asking to spend the night at Charlie's before going to Las Vegas to get married, but Berta arrives and takes her home. Title quotation from: Berta, describing Prudence's smell to Jake.
13	13	"Sarah Like Puny Alan"	Robert Berlinger	Story by : Chuck Lorre; Teleplay by : Lee Aronsohn & Don Foster	January 12, 2004	176811	17.86
Charlie is excited to finally get a chance for a double date with a hot neighbor and her sister who's a hot soap opera actress, and talks Alan into joining him. But on the day, Alan has caught the flu from a sick Jake, so Charlie takes them to a steam room to help Alan get rid of his symptoms. This backfires, as Charlie also gets sick, but he is still determined to go ahead with the date. Title quotation from: Alan, imitating a girl he got stuck with while double dating with Charlie.
14	14	"I Can't Afford Hyenas"	Rob Schiller	Story by : Chuck Lorre & Lee Aronsohn; Teleplay by : Jeff Abugov & Eddie Gorodetsky	February 2, 2004	176812	16.48
After Charlie's credit card gets declined, he visits his accountant, Stan (Richard Lewis), who explains that Charlie spends his money faster than his royalty checks come in. Alan coaches a reluctant Charlie on how to live frugally, and suggests that the alternative is for Charlie to get a temporary loan from their mother. Evelyn agrees to it, but then Charlie gets annoyed when she wants them all to go out for lunch together, and he tears up her check. Rose visits and tells Charlie she is loaded, and he agrees for her to lend him the money. Title quotation from: Charlie, realizing he cannot afford what he hopes to buy.
15	15	"Round One to the Hot Crazy Chick"	Andrew D. Weyman	Chuck Lorre & Lee Aronsohn	February 9, 2004	176814	16.96
Against Alan's judgement, Charlie falls for a seemingly crazy woman named Frankie (Jenna Elfman) whom the brothers find smashing up a BMW in a parking lot with a baseball bat. She reveals that she has nowhere to stay, and Charlie invites her to spend the night at his place. The next day, Frankie says she needs to pick something up, which turns out to be her 8-year-old daughter. Title quotation from: Charlie, after being told by Frankie she won't have sex with him.
16	16	"That Was Saliva, Alan"	Andrew D. Weyman	Chuck Lorre & Lee Aronsohn	February 16, 2004	176815	17.39
Frankie tells Charlie and Alan why she and her daughter are on the run. Frankie's daughter has a crush on Jake, who doesn't respond to this. Frankie and Alan end up sharing a kiss, and Alan takes her and her daughter out for a picnic, with hopes of starting a relationship with Frankie. Frankie eventually says that she cannot date Alan, even though she does spend the night with him. As she leaves for Seattle, she gives him her bra as a memento of her. Title quotation from: Charlie, after Alan explains the rush of feelings he has for Frankie.
17	17	"Ate the Hamburgers, Wearing the Hats"	Andrew D. Weyman	Story by : Jeff Abugov & Eric Lapidus; Teleplay by : Eddie Gorodetsky & Mark Roberts	February 23, 2004	176816	16.48
Alan offends Charlie by choosing their cousins from Rhode Island as Jake's guardians in the event of his and Judith's deaths. After Alan goes out, Charlie accidentally injures Jake during a basketball game, but manages to take good care of him by driving him to the hospital. This makes Alan realize that Charlie can take care of Jake and he chooses Charlie to be Jake's guardian when he and Judith pass instead. Title quotation from: Charlie, as he attempts to cover the fact that Jake has stitches from a basketball accident.
18	18	"An Old Flame with a New Wick"	Andrew D. Weyman	Story by : Chuck Lorre & Don Foster; Teleplay by : Lee Aronsohn & Mark Roberts	March 1, 2004	176818	17.10
Charlie goes to meet his ex-girlfriend, Jill, who has invited him to the bar, but he is stunned when he learns that Jill is now a trans man (Chris O'Donnell) who calls himself Bill. Berta greatly enjoys the situation, especially when Evelyn meets Bill and they start dating. Title quotation from: Berta, about Charlie's ex-girlfriend who has had a sex-change.
19	19	"I Remember the Coatroom, I Just Don't Remember You"	Gail Mancuso	Story by : Chuck Lorre & Lee Aronsohn; Teleplay by : Don Foster & Eddie Gorodetsky	March 22, 2004	176819	16.43
Judith's sister Liz (Teri Hatcher), whom Charlie slept with at Alan's wedding, hits on now-free Alan at Jake's birthday party. In order to keep her sister separate from her ex-husband, Judith claims she's going to seduce Charlie, a tactic which works successfully. Elsewhere, Evelyn prefers alcohol to cake and becomes inebriated during Jake's party. Title quotation from: Liz, after Charlie asks her about the time at Alan and Judith's wedding reception.
20	20	"Hey, I Can Pee Outside in the Dark"	Gary Halvorson	Story by : Chuck Lorre & Lee Aronsohn; Teleplay by : Jeff Abugov & Mark Roberts	April 19, 2004	176820	14.58
Judith believes that Jake is having a hard time dealing with his parents' divorce, when he starts annoying everyone with his non-stop guitar playing (he only plays one song over and over). She suggests that they send Jake to a therapist (Jane Lynch). After the adults make many futile attempts to speak with him, Jake comes downstairs in a cheerful mood. When they question each other about it, Berta reveals that she spoke to Jake and gave him prune juice; he was constipated. The episode ends with a jam session of Charlie, Alan, and Jake, with Jake running off to the restroom thanks to the prune juice. Title quotation from: Alan after Charlie discovers he saw a therapist as a child.
21	21	"No Sniffing, No Wowing"	Rob Schiller	Story by : Lee Aronsohn & Susan Beavers; Teleplay by : Chuck Lorre & Don Foster	May 3, 2004	176817	16.20
Charlie jeopardizes Alan's divorce settlement by sleeping with his attorney, Laura (Heather Locklear), who takes a liking to Charlie and blackmails him with Alan's settlement if he breaks up with her. After Charlie stupidly breaks up with her, Laura spitefully grants Judith with most of Alan's personal possessions. Though Alan fires Laura and has her decisions negated, he furiously chases Charlie around the house. Title quotation from: Alan, giving Charlie explicit instructions not to have anything to do with the attorney.
22	22	"My Doctor Has a Cow Puppet"	Gail Mancuso	Story by : Lee Aronsohn & Don Foster; Teleplay by : Chuck Lorre & Eddie Gorodetsky	May 10, 2004	176821	16.01
Charlie attempts to cure Alan of his recent bout of sleepwalking. Jake sees his therapist, who ends up treating Alan, too. Title quotation from: Jake, explaining to Evelyn about his therapist.
23	23	"Just Like Buffalo"	Rob Schiller	Story by : Chuck Lorre & Susan Beavers; Teleplay by : Lee Aronsohn & Don Foster	May 17, 2004	176822	15.20
Judith has her support group over, and Jake repeats Charlie's negative comments about women, in which Charlie said that as long as you have a woman for sexual pleasure and another for cleaning, there should be no reason to get married. Furious, Judith prevents Jake from going to Charlie's the following weekend, until Charlie manages to woo her support group by having them, too, spend some time at his house. Title quotation from: Charlie, describing the women of Judith's support group.
24	24	"Can You Feel My Finger?"	Rob Schiller	Story by : Chuck Lorre; Teleplay by : Chuck Lorre & Lee Aronsohn	May 24, 2004	176823	18.16
A woman with whom Charlie has had sex thinks she is pregnant, but turns out not to be. Following this close call, Charlie attempts to get a vasectomy. At first he seems okay with the idea after witnessing how troublesome babies can be, but after seeing how happy his doctor, Dr. Sperlock (Terry Rhoads), is when he learns he is going to be a father, Charlie decides against the operation – and scores a date with the doctor's assistant. Title quotation from: Dr. Sperlock, making sure the anesthetic is working.
