= Lance Guest =

American actor (born 1960)

- Guest in 2024
- Born: July 21, 1960 (age 66); Saratoga, California, U.S.
- Education: University of California, Los Angeles
- Occupation: Actor
- Years active: 1981–present
- Children: 1

Lance R. Guest (born July 21, 1960) is an American actor. Known for his film work throughout the 1980s and various television roles thereafter, he made his screen debut with a supporting role in Halloween II (1981). This was followed by headline parts in The Last Starfighter (1984) and Jaws: The Revenge (1987). Between 2010 and 2012, Guest appeared both on and off-Broadway in the musical Million Dollar Quartet, playing Johnny Cash.

== Biography ==
Guest was born and raised in Saratoga, California. Guest developed a serious interest in acting as a freshman while attending Saratoga High School, and also played guitar in a local band called Stillwater. Guest majored in theater at the UCLA.

== Career ==
Guest made his feature film debut as Jimmy, a paramedic attempting to save Laurie Strode (Jamie Lee Curtis) in Halloween II (1981). He also starred in [1980] The Roommate {John Updike} and Neil Simon's I Ought to Be in Pictures. His most notable role was in the science fiction film The Last Starfighter (1984) as Alex Rogan, and as Beta, a robot sent to replace Alex while he was in space. Guest also starred in Jaws: The Revenge (1987) as Michael Brody.

Guest played Cosmo Cola in Stepsister from Planet Weird (2000). In 2001, he played Hugo Archibald in The Jennie Project (2001). Also that year, he appeared in Mach 2 (2001).

Guest's starring television roles included Lou Grant (1981–1982) and Knots Landing (1991). Additionally, he has made guest appearances on St. Elsewhere, The Wonder Years, Party of Five, JAG, NYPD Blue, The X-Files, Becker, Life Goes On, House, and Jericho.

Guest starred as Johnny Cash in the Broadway musical Million Dollar Quartet, a fictionalized depiction of the only time that Cash, Carl Perkins, Jerry Lee Lewis, and Elvis Presley recorded music together.

== Personal life ==
Guest has one son.

== Filmography ==
=== Film ===
Year	Title	Role	Notes
1981	Halloween II	Jimmy	
1982	I Ought to Be in Pictures	Gordon	
1984	The Last Starfighter	Alex Rogan / Beta Alex	
1984	Just the Way You Are	Jack the Answering Service Guy	
1985	Waiting to Act	Body Snatcher Guy	
1987	Jaws: The Revenge	Michael Brody	
1988	The Wizard of Loneliness	John T.	
1997	Plan B	Jack Sadler	
2001	Mach 2	Keith Dorman	
2007	Shadowbox	Morell - Shadow Man	Short
2008	The Least of These	Mark Roberts	
2009	21 and a Wake-Up	Dr. Oscar Kimber	
2014	Late Phases	James Griffin	
2017	Traces	Nelson	
2022	In Search of Tomorrow	Himself	Documentary

=== Television ===
Year	Title	Role	Notes
1981	Dallas	Student	1 episode: "The Mark of Cain"
1981	Why Us?	Hugh Whitaker	TV short
1981	Please Don't Hit Me, Mom	Michael Reynolds	TV film
1981–1982	Lou Grant	Lance Reinecke / Mark	7 episodes
1982	Cassie & Co.	David Cooper	1 episode
1982–1983	St. Elsewhere	Orderly Sean Rooney	4 episodes: "Down's Syndrome", "Legionnaires: Part 1 & 2", "Hearts"
1982–1985	ABC Afterschool Special	Tim / Doug Henshaw	2 episodes: "One Too Many", "Between Two Loves"
1983	Confessions of a Married Man	Arthur	TV film
1984	American Playhouse	Orson Ziegler	1 episode: "The Roommate"
1985	My Father, My Rival	Scott	TV film
1988	Favorite Son	David Ross	1 episode: "Part One"
1991	Knots Landing	Steve Brewer	13 episodes
1992	The Wonder Years	Mike Detweiller	1 episode: "Politics as Usual"
1992	Life Goes On	Michael Romanov	6 episodes
1993	Hart to Hart Returns	Peter McDowell	TV film
1995	All-American Girl	Leon	1 episode: "Venus de Margaret"
1995	The X-Files	Kyle Lang	1 episode: "Fearful Symmetry"
1995–1996	Party of Five	Mr. Allen Peck	2 episodes: "Dearly Beloved", "Unfair Advantage"
1997	The Burning Zone	Russ Johnson	1 episode: "Critical Mass"
1999	Becker	Dr. Harvey Cohen	1 episode: "Saving Harvey Cohen"
1999	Thanks	John the Blacksmith	1 episode: "Marriage"
2000	Then Came You	Tom	1 episode: "Then Came a Wedding"
2000	Stepsister from Planet Weird	Cosmo Cola	TV film
2001	The Jennie Project	Hugo Archibald	TV film
2001	JAG	Cmdr. Stacy Loftness	2 episodes: "Adrift: Part 1 & 2"
2001	Bitter Winter		TV film
2004	NYPD Blue	Mercy Hawks	1 episode: "Traylor Trash"
2006	House	Lewis Bardach	1 episode: "Safe"
2007	Alibi	Peterson	TV film
2008	Jericho	Alex Utley	1 episode: "Condor"
2008	Flu Bird Horror	Garrett	TV film
2010	Late Show with David Letterman	Johnny Cash	1 episode: "Evangeline Lilly/Sam Rockwell/Million Dollar Quartet/Aaron Kelly"
2010	Late Night with Jimmy Fallon	Johnny Cash	1 episode: "No. 2.104"
2012	All-American New Year's Eve 2013	Johnny Cash	TV film
2014	Christmas Eve, 1914	John Gilliam	TV film
2022	The Patient	Paul	1 episode: "The Cantor's Husband"

== Stage credits ==
Year	Title	Role	Notes	Ref.
2010	Million Dollar Quartet	Johnny Cash	Nederlander Theatre	
2011	Million Dollar Quartet	Johnny Cash	New World Stages	
