= The Last Starfighter: Tunnel Chase =

Board game

The Last Starfighter: Tunnel Chase is a 1984 board game published by FASA and based on the film The Last Starfighter released that year.

== Gameplay ==
The Last Starfighter: Tunnel Chase is a game in which space fighters chase one other in the tunnels inside an asteroid.

== Reception ==
Craig Sheeley reviewed The Last Starfighter: Tunnel Chase in Space Gamer magazine No. 71. Sheeley wrote "Hurrah for the newest entry into minigames, The Last Starfighter: Tunnel Chase! Another triumph for FASA."
