= Bunny Summers =

American actress

- Born: Bernice Siegel; February 23, 1924; Brooklyn, New York, U.S.
- Died: September 9, 2010 (aged 86); Woodland Hills, Los Angeles, California, U.S.
- Resting place: Eden Memorial Park, Mission Hills, California
- Occupation: Actress
- Years active: 1940s–2004
- Spouse: Ben Sussman
- Children: 3

Bunny Summers (born Bernice Siegel; February 23, 1924 – September 9, 2010) was an American character actress known for her work in stage and screen productions from the 1940s through the 1990s. Active in both professional and community theater, she was a frequent performer in Los Angeles-area productions and later appeared in regional theaters across the United States. Her screen credits include roles in The Last Starfighter (1984), Re-Animator (1985), From Beyond (1986), and Merlin's Shop of Mystical Wonders (1995).

== Early life ==
Bunny Summers was born Bernice Siegel on February 23, 1924, in Brooklyn, New York. She began performing at the age of 13 on the Borscht Belt circuit in New York, an early proving ground for many American entertainers.

By the early 1960s, she had relocated to Sherman Oaks, California, where she raised three daughters and became active in local theater. She was known professionally as Bunny Summers, but was often credited in community roles as Mrs. Ben Sussman.

== Theater career ==
Summers gained prominence in Los Angeles's theater scene throughout the 1960s and 1970s. In 1965, she starred as a teacher in Dear Me, the Sky Is Falling at the Players Ring-Gallery Theatre in Hollywood, a performance highlighted in the Los Angeles Times and other Valley newspapers.

In July 1973, she played the lead role of Minnie Marx in the West Coast premiere of Minnie's Boys, a musical based on the early life of the Marx Brothers. The production took place at the Academy Theatre in Chatsworth, California, and featured Summers prominently in promotional materials and reviews.

Summers continued acting on stage throughout the 1970s and 1980s, including a performance in Come Blow Your Horn at the 565 Broadway Dinner Theater in Tacoma, Washington, in 1979.

In 1991, she portrayed Golde in Fiddler on the Roof at the Jupiter Theatre in Jupiter, Florida, opposite Marty Ross as Tevye. Though one critic noted limitations in her singing voice, her stage presence was praised.

In 1998, her appearance in Merlin's Shop of Mystical Wonders was promoted in UK television listings, with her name among the lead cast.

Her television credits reportedly include guest roles on popular shows such as Family Ties, Seinfeld, Married... with Children, The Facts of Life, Saved by the Bell, and ALF.

== Personal life ==
Bunny Summers was married and known socially as Mrs. Ben Sussman. She was an active member of the Cadenzas, the women's auxiliary of the San Fernando Valley Symphony Association, and often participated in benefit performances for local arts organizations.

== Death ==
Summers died on September 9, 2010, in Woodland Hills, Los Angeles. She is interred at Eden Memorial Park in Mission Hills, California.

== Filmography ==
=== Film ===
Year	Title	Role	Notes
1968	Funny Girl	Mrs. Nadler	Uncredited
1969	The Love God?	Minor Role	Uncredited
1971	Doctors' Wives	Chatroom Nurse	Uncredited
1972	Fuzz	Mrs. Cooper	
1973	Little Cigars	Matron	Uncredited
1977	The World's Greatest Lover	Mother on Train	
1978	Jokes My Folks Never Told Me	–	
1984	The Last Starfighter	Mrs. Boone	
1984	Weekend Pass	Sadie	
1985	The Ladies Club	Miss Barnes	
1986	Outrageous Fortune	Costume Lady	
1986	From Beyond	Neighbor Lady	
1986	Sylvan in Paradise	The Lady	TV movie
1986	Second Serve	Mrs. Crockett	TV movie
1988	The Wrong Guys	Louie's Mom	
1988	Big Top Pee-wee	Costume Woman	
1989	Skinheads	Bessie	
1993	Russian Holiday	Helen Meadows	
1993	Fatal Instinct	Train Passenger	
1996	Merlin's Shop of Mystical Wonders	Zurella	
1997	Sparkler	Eager Old Lady	
1998	Denial	Pearl	
2000	Big Wind on Campus	Grandma Morton	
2001	Night at the Golden Eagle	Waitress	
2001	Killer Bud	Nurse Blatch	

=== Television ===
Year	Title	Role	Notes
1966	Petticoat Junction	Sadie Prentiss / Mrs. Hennessy	2 episodes
1967	Laredo	Amy Bergstrom	1 episode
1969	The Ghost & Mrs. Muir	PTA Member	1 episode, uncredited
1969–1971	The Doris Day Show	Lucy James / Woman #2 / Harriet	3 episodes
1970	Dan August	Woman in Bowling Alley	1 episode
1971	That Girl	Wardrobe Lady	1 episode
1976	The Feather and Father Gang	Mrs. Van Owen	1 episode
1976	Grady	Mrs. Gordon	1 episode
1977	Baretta	Sweet Anne	1 episode
1980	Palmerstown, U.S.A.	–	1 episode
1980	Portrait of a Rebel: The Remarkable Mrs. Sanger	Rose	TV movie
1980–1982	The Facts of Life	Hill / Matron	2 episodes
1981	Quincy, M.E.	Marie	1 episode
1981	Stand by Your Man	Mrs. Watkins	TV movie
1981	One Day at a Time	Lady	1 episode
1981	Choices	Lady in Pharmacy	TV movie
1982	Cagney & Lacey	Mrs. Nolan	1 episode
1982	Crisis Counselor	–	1 episode
1982	Skeezer	Sally	TV movie
1983	Manimal	Pudgy Lady	1 episode
1983	Gimme a Break!	–	1 episode
1984	Alice	Customer No. 2	1 episode
1984	Masquerade	Woman	1 episode
1984	Night Court	Cafeteria Cashier	1 episode
1985	Sara	Mrs. Ferguson	1 episode
1985	Hardcastle and McCormick	Ruth	1 episode
1986	ALF	Bunny	1 episode
1986	Perfect Strangers	Lou's Mother	1 episode
1986	Crossings	Maid	TV miniseries
1986	Moonlighting	Bridal Candidate	1 episode
1983–1988	Family Ties	Barbara / Customer #1 / Mrs. Binney	4 episodes
1987	Who's the Boss?	Mrs. Cassio	1 episode
1987	Easy Street	Millicent	1 episode
1987	The New Mike Hammer	Ruth McLaughlin	1 episode
1988	Starting from Scratch	Miss Flutter	2 episodes
1988	Favorite Son	Dolores	3 episodes, miniseries
1989	Married... with Children	Mrs. Wicker	1 episode
1989	Saved by the Bell	Mrs. Cummings	1 episode
1990	Knots Landing	Director	1 episode
1990	Faith	Bag Lady	1 episode
1990	Empty Nest	Nina Feldman	1 episode
1990	Newhart	Nanny	1 episode
1990	Singer & Sons	Mrs. Drepner	1 episode
1991	The Antagonists	Older Woman	1 episode
1990–1991	True Colors	Marge	4 episodes
1992	Civil Wars	Sadie Mestman	1 episode
1995	The Parent 'Hood	Mrs. Dumont	1 episode
1995	Maybe This Time	Farrah	1 episode
1997	Seinfeld	Rider	1 episode
1997	Alright Already	Bunny	1 episode
1998	Ellen	Mom	1 episode
2000	Norm	Large Woman	1 episode
2000	Senior House	Senior #2	13 episodes, voice
2000	Time of Your Life	Woman	1 episode
2000	That's Life	Senior #2	1 episode
2001	Kristin	Sadie Leperman	1 episode
2001	Virtually Casey	Mrs. Despio	TV movie
2001	FreakyLinks	Sara	1 episode
2003	Audrey's Rain	Widow #1	TV movie
2004	Happy Family	Gladys	1 episode

=== Stage credits ===
- Dear Me, the Sky Is Falling (1965) – Players Ring-Gallery Theatre, Hollywood
- Minnie's Boys (1973) – Minnie Marx, Academy Theatre, Chatsworth
- Come Blow Your Horn (1979) – 565 Broadway Dinner Theater, Tacoma
- Fiddler on the Roof (1991) – Golde, Jupiter Theatre, Florida
