= Greg Pritikin =

American film director and screenwriter

Greg Pritikin is an independent filmmaker from Chicago.

== Biography ==
According to his official biography, Pritikin inherited a love of film from his father, who had an extensive collection of 16mm prints. Pritikin watched them religiously before starting to make his own 8mm films at the age of eight.

=== Movie career ===
His first three feature films, Totally Confused, Dummy and Surviving Eden, all comedies, deal with, in the writer/director’s words, "small triumphs by small people."

Pritikin entered the world of independent filmmaking in 1998 with his first feature, Totally Confused. The film was co-written and co-directed with childhood friend, Gary Rosen. Soon after, Pritikin wrote and directed his second film, Dummy, a comedy about a young man struggling to overcome his shyness with the help of a ventriloquist dummy. The film starred Adrien Brody, Milla Jovovich, Illeana Douglas, Jared Harris, Vera Farmiga, Ron Leibman and Jessica Walter.

Surviving Eden, his third feature, is a satire about reality TV starring Michael Panes, Peter Dinklage, Cheri Oteri, Jane Lynch, Conchata Ferrell, Savannah Haske and John Landis.

Though he claims he never watched a music video in his life, Pritikin has directed several of them, including one for Willie Nelson.

He was awarded the Special Jury Prize at the Santa Barbara International Film Festival for Dummy and Best Screenplay for Surviving Eden at the Milan International Film Festival.

Pritikin directed the 2011 television film Monster of the House.

== Filmography as director ==
- Totally Confused (1998)
- Dummy (2002)
- Surviving Eden (2004)
- Monster of the House (2011)
- The Last Laugh (2019)
