= Keep the Change =

Keep the Change may refer to:

- Keep the Change (1992 film), a TV film starring William Petersen, adapted from a novel by Thomas McGuane
- Keep the Change (2017 film), an American romantic comedy film
- Keep the Change, an album by ApologetiX
- Keep the Change, an album by Ralph Bowen
- "Keep the Change" (General Hospital: Night Shift), an episode of the American TV series General Hospital: Night Shift
- Keep the Change, a novel by Thomas McGuane
- "Keep the Change", a 2009 song by Holly Williams from the album Here with Me
- "Keep the Change", a 2010 song by Darryl Worley
- "Keep the Change", a 2011 song by Hank Williams Jr.

== See also ==
- Tip (gratuity)
