= Surviving Eden =

- Directed by: Greg Pritikin
- Written by: Greg Pritikin
- Story by: Joanne Giovannini Storkan
- Produced by: Lisa Larrivee
- Starring: Michael Panes; Cheri Oteri; Jane Lynch; Sam Robards; Savannah Haske; Peter Dinklage; Conchata Farrell; John Landis
- Cinematography: Frederic Goodich
- Edited by: Michael Palmerio
- Music by: Greg Pritikin
- Production companies: Picture Entertainment Corp. Honest Engine Films
- Distributed by: Good Films Releasing; Cineville
- Release date: August 25, 2006 (Manhattan)
- Running time: 83 minutes 89 minutes
- Country: United States
- Language: English

Surviving Eden is a 2004 American comedy film written by Joanne Giovannini Storkan and Greg Pritikin, directed by Pritikin and starring Michael Panes, Cheri Oteri, Jane Lynch and Peter Dinklage.

== Plot ==
Dennis Flotchky wins a reality TV show and becomes the subject of a documentary that chronicles his short-lived fame and fortune.

== Cast ==
- Michael Panes as Dennis Flotchky
- Cheri Oteri as Maria Villanova
- Jane Lynch as Maude Silver
- Sam Robards as Gary Gold
- Savannah Haske as Sister Agnes O'Malley
- Peter Dinklage as "Sterno"
- John Landis as Dr. Levine
- Conchata Ferrell as Rosemary Flotchky
- Kentaro Abe as Kendo
- Gary Rosen as Larry
- Deep Roy as Mo "Indian Mo"
- Jackie Katzman

== Release ==
The film was released in Manhattan on August 25, 2006.

== Reception ==
The film has a 14% rating on Rotten Tomatoes based on 14 reviews. Nick Schager of Slant Magazine awarded the film 1 and a half stars out four.

Stephen Holden of The New York Times gave the film a negative review and wrote, "Although the early scenes hold out some promise that Greg Pritikin’s Surviving Eden, a parody of Survivor in which contestants compete for a million-dollar payday by playing Adam and Eve in a jungle setting, could amount to something, the movie quickly runs out of ideas."
