= Dummy (2002 film) =

2002 film by Greg Pritikin

- Theatrical release poster
- Directed by: Greg Pritikin
- Written by: Greg Pritikin
- Produced by: Richard Temtchine; Bob Fagan
- Starring: Adrien Brody; Milla Jovovich; Illeana Douglas; Vera Farmiga; Jessica Walter; Ron Leibman; Jared Harris
- Cinematography: Horacio Marquínez
- Edited by: William Henry; Michael Palmerio
- Music by: Paul Wallfisch
- Production company: Quadrant Entertainment
- Distributed by: Artisan Entertainment
- Release dates: February 21, 2002 (AFM); September 12, 2003 (United States)
- Running time: 91 minutes
- Country: United States
- Language: English
- Box office: $71,646

Dummy is a 2002 American romantic comedy-drama film written and directed by Greg Pritikin. The film stars Adrien Brody as an ex-office worker who becomes a ventriloquist. It also stars Milla Jovovich, Illeana Douglas, Vera Farmiga, Jessica Walter, Ron Leibman, and Jared Harris. It premiered at the American Film Market on February 21, 2002, and received a limited theatrical release on September 12, 2003.

== Plot ==
Steven Schoichet is a socially awkward young man who still lives with his overbearing parents, Lou and Fern, and his abrasive sister, Heidi. Struggling to communicate with people, he buys a ventriloquist dummy named Woody, hoping ventriloquism will help him gain confidence and improve his social skills. After accidentally destroying a copy machine, Steven loses his office job. Seeking encouragement, he turns to his only friend, Fangora “Fanny” Gurkel, an eccentric and unhinged aspiring musician. Fanny insists that success is just around the corner: Steven will become a famous ventriloquist, and her punk rock band will finally succeed.

While applying for unemployment benefits, Steven meets Lorena Fanchetti and immediately develops a crush on her. Lorena is amused by Steven’s ventriloquism ambitions, and he begins taking classes to improve his act with Woody. At the same time, Heidi’s obsessive ex-fiancé, actor Michael Foulicker, begs Steven to help him reconcile with her, claiming he has become sober and changed his life. Heidi instead asks Steven to lie to Michael and tell him she is seeing someone else.

After discovering that Lorena is single, Fanny pressures Steven into making a dramatic romantic gesture by spray-painting “I OWE YOU ONE, STEVEN” on Lorena’s front door and leaving flowers on her doorstep. Horrified, Lorena contacts the police and obtains a temporary restraining order against him. Determined to explain himself, Steven violates the restraining order by sending Lorena a videotaped apology performed through Woody. Instead of reacting angrily, Lorena finds the gesture sincere and agrees to meet him for coffee. The date goes well, and the two begin spending time together. Lorena reveals that she is a widow raising her daughter Bonnie alone after her husband died in a car accident on their wedding day.

Meanwhile, Fanny learns that Heidi has abandoned her singing career and now works as a wedding planner. When one of Heidi’s clients requests klezmer music for the upcoming wedding, Fanny falsely claims to be an experienced klezmer musician in order to secure the gig for her band, despite knowing nothing about the genre. Lorena visits Steven’s home for dinner with Bonnie, but the evening is ruined by arguments among Steven’s dysfunctional family. Despite this, Lorena continues seeing him, and they share several more dates. However, Lorena gradually becomes uneasy with Steven’s dependence on Woody and his inability to express himself without the dummy. Though she genuinely likes him, she admits she is not ready for another difficult relationship, especially after her last boyfriend turned out to be a stalker. She ends the relationship, disappointing both Steven and Bonnie, who had grown attached to Woody. Feeling humiliated and immature, Steven returns Woody to the store where he bought it.

The morning before the wedding she is planning, Heidi suffers an emotional breakdown. Frustrated by years of feeling overlooked, she lashes out at her parents for encouraging Steven’s ventriloquism ambitions while dismissing her own aspirations as a singer. Steven realizes how much his sister needs support and gets Woody back. At the wedding, Fanny and her band unexpectedly manage to perform the klezmer music successfully. Heidi, however, spirals further into depression and angrily rejects Michael once again when he begs her to reunite with him. Wanting to help his sister, Steven performs ventriloquism at the reception. There, he encounters Lorena and Bonnie among the guests.

Michael dramatically proposes to Heidi while brandishing a handgun, believing an extreme gesture will prove his love. Steven and Lorena rush toward the disturbance, and Lorena reveals that Michael was also her unstable ex-boyfriend. Thinking quickly, Steven uses his ventriloquism skills to imitate a police officer shouting from behind Michael and ordering him to drop the weapon. Distracted, Michael lowers the gun long enough for Steven to tackle him. During the struggle, the gun fires, but it is revealed to be a blank-firing prop borrowed from the theater where Michael works. Steven punches Michael and he leaves with Lorena, who realizes that beneath his awkwardness, Steven is compassionate and courageous. The two reconcile, while Bonnie happily reunites with Woody. Inspired by Steven’s renewed confidence, Heidi returns to singing at the wedding reception. At the same time, Fanny, impressed by Michael’s dramatic behavior, begins a relationship with him.

== Cast ==
- Adrien Brody as Steven Schoichet
- Milla Jovovich as Fangora "Fanny" Gurkel
- Illeana Douglas as Heidi Schoichet
- Vera Farmiga as Lorena Fanchetti
- Jessica Walter as Fern Schoichet
- Ron Leibman as Lou Schoichet
- Jared Harris as Michael Foulicker
- Mirabella Pisani as Bonnie
- Helen Hanft as Mrs. Gurkel
- Richmond Hoxie as Sorensen
- Adam LeFevre as Theatre Director
- Poppi Kramer as Jen Freed
- Alan Demovsky as Talking Mime
- Lou Martini Jr. as Unemployed Italian
- Gabor Morea as Unemployed Frottager
- Edward Hibbert as Unemployed Actor
- Robert Larkin as Pharmacist
- Alan Semok as Professor Parlepancia
- John Elsen as Cop
- Debbie Ross as Le Bagel Waitress
- Natalia Paruz as musical saw player (uncredited)
- Lawrence Leritz as Groom (uncredited)

== Production ==
=== Casting ===
In May 2000, it was reported by Variety that Adrien Brody and Milla Jovovich had been cast in the film, Brody as the lead character of Steven, and Jovovich as the best friend of Brody's character. The following month, in June 2000, it was announced that Illeana Douglas had joined the cast in a supporting role. Vera Farmiga, Ron Leibman, Jared Harris and Jessica Walter were also cast in supporting roles. Brody (who had no previous experience as a ventriloquist) performed all of the ventriloquism and puppetry live during shooting, doing so without puppeteering stand-ins or voiceover dubbing. He was coached prior to and during production by veteran actor-ventriloquist-puppet maker Alan Semok, who is credited in the film as special consultant and designer/creator of the title character.

=== Filming ===
Principal photography took place in New York City, Wayne, New Jersey, and Long Island, New York in July and August 2000.

== Reception ==
=== Box office ===
The film was given a limited release in the United States. Dummy made $30,130 from 5 theaters in its opening weekend. It made an additional $41,516 at the box office for a total domestic gross of $71,646.

=== Critical reception ===
Dummy received mostly positive reviews from film critics. On Rotten Tomatoes, the film has an approval rating of 70%, based on 33 reviews, with an average rating of 6.15/10. The site's consensus reads, "Dummy is a sweet family comedy that succeeds due to charming performances, even if the final product feels slightly undercooked." On Metacritic, the film holds a 48% rating based on 12 critical reviews, indicating "mixed or average" reviews.
