= David Trottier =

American screenwriter (1949–2026)

- Born: January 23, 1949
- Died: March 24, 2026 (aged 77)
- Occupations: Author, educator, screenwriter, consultant
- Years active: 1994—?
- Known for: The Screenwriter's Bible

David Robert Trottier (January 23, 1949 – March 24, 2026) was an American screenwriter, consultant, author and educator. He is best known for his screenwriting guide, The Screenwriter's Bible.

== Life and career ==
Trottier graduated with an M.A. from Goddard College, as well as the Hollywood Scriptwriting Institute and the Hollywood Film Institute.

After doing some minor rewrites on Zorro the Gay Blade, Trottier sold his first spec, The Secret of Question Mark Cave to Disney. Trottier would sell projects to Jim Henson Pictures, York Entertainment, On the Bus Productions, ABC and New Century Pictures. These include Igor's Revenge, The Muppet's Hockey Movie—The Comeback Kids (not completed due to Henson's death), Ratman From Saturn, Kumquat, The New Musketeers, and A Window in Time. He also co-wrote and co-produced Hercules Recycled.

Trottier died on March 24, 2026, at the age of 77.

== Publications ==
- The Screenwriter's Bible: A Complete Guide to Writing, Formatting, and Selling Your Script. Clear Stream Inc Publishing. 1994. ISBN 9781885655035.
- Dr. Format Tells All: Everything you need to format your screenplay (4th ed.). Applewood Arts. 2019. ISBN 9781885655141.
