= Conchata Ferrell =

American actress (1943–2020)

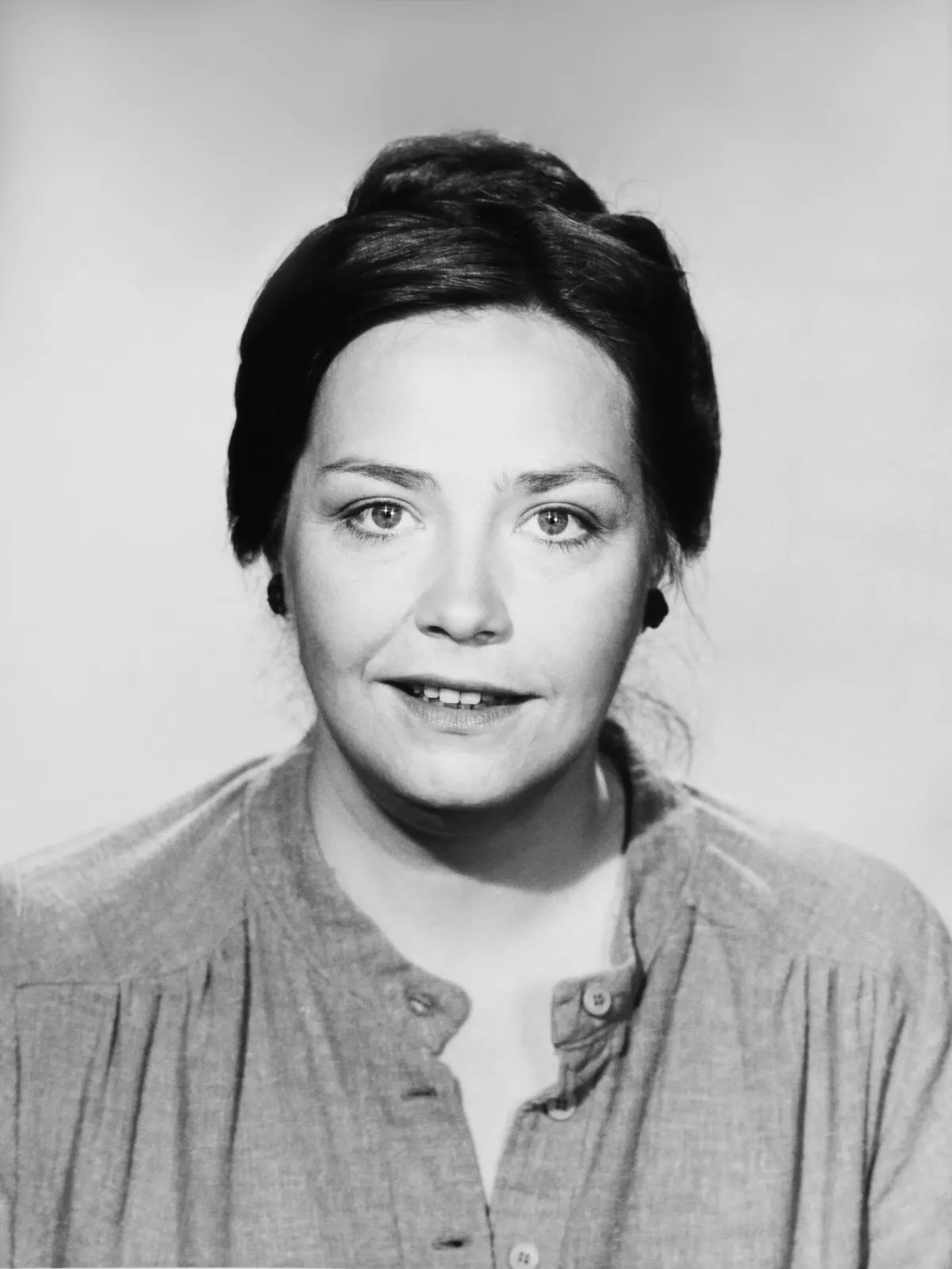
- Ferrell in 1981
- Born: Conchata Galen Ferrell; March 28, 1943; Loudendale, West Virginia, U.S.
- Died: October 12, 2020 (aged 77); Sherman Oaks, California, U.S.
- Burial place: Forest Cemetery, Circleville, Pickaway County, Ohio, U.S.
- Education: Marshall University (BA)
- Occupation: Actress
- Years active: 1964–2020
- Spouse: Arnie Anderson (m. 1986)
- Children: 1

Conchata Galen Ferrell (March 28, 1943 – October 12, 2020) was an American actress. She played Berta the housekeeper on the sitcom Two and a Half Men from 2003 to 2015, and she received two nominations for the Primetime Emmy Award for Outstanding Supporting Actress in a Comedy Series for the role (in 2005 and 2007), as well as a TV Land Award in 2009. Ferrell had previously been nominated for the Primetime Emmy Award for Outstanding Supporting Actress in a Drama Series for her performance in L.A. Law (in 1992). A seasoned stage actress, Ferrell's performance in the stage play The Sea Horse earned her an Obie Award, a Drama Desk Award and a Theatre World Award. Her big screen work included roles in such films as Network (1976), Where the River Runs Black (1986), For Keeps (1988), Edward Scissorhands (1990), True Romance (1993), Erin Brockovich (2000) and Krampus (2015). Ferrell's turn in the 1979 frontier western saga Heartland earned her a Western Heritage Award.

== Early life ==
Conchata Galen Ferrell was born March 28, 1943, in Loudendale, West Virginia, the first of two children, to Mescal Loraine (née George) and Luther Martin Ferrell. She was raised in Charleston, West Virginia. Her family later moved to Circleville, Ohio.

She attended West Virginia University for two years, dropped out, and after working several jobs, enrolled and graduated from Marshall University with a degree in history education. She made her first onstage performance at Marshall in 1969, in the second Barfenon Review, a skit comedy and musical production.

== Career ==
Ferrell began her career on the stage as a member of the Circle Repertory Company. She appeared in the original off-Broadway cast of Lanford Wilson's The Hot l Baltimore and won the Drama Desk, Obie, and Theatre World Best Actress awards for her performance in the off-Broadway play The Sea Horse.

Acting on stage, television, and film for decades, she starred as the frontier wife in the 1979 feature film Heartland directed by Richard Pearce, and as the tough-talking owner of Mystic Pizza (1988), co-starring alongside Lili Taylor, Annabeth Gish, and Julia Roberts, who portrayed pizza waitresses. She also played a tough, comical nurse on the short-lived 1980s TV sitcom E/R.

In 1992, she received her first Primetime Emmy Award nomination for Outstanding Supporting Actress in a Drama Series for her recurring role as Attorney Susan Bloom on the sixth season of L.A. Law, but lost to Valerie Mahaffey for Northern Exposure. She had previously appeared in an episode of the show in 1988 as Lorna Landsberg, an entirely different character. Her other television credits include Maude, Buffy the Vampire Slayer, Hot l Baltimore, Teen Angel, Matlock, B. J. and the Bear, Good Times, Hearts Afire, Townies, Night Court, The Love Boat, and Push, Nevada. She played Mrs. Werner in the episode of Quincy, M.E. titled "Into the Murdering Mind" (1982). She also made memorable appearances portraying blunt, authoritative judges (the "Jagged Sledge" episode of Sledge Hammer! in 1987, and on "The One with Joey's Porsche" episode of Friends in 1999).

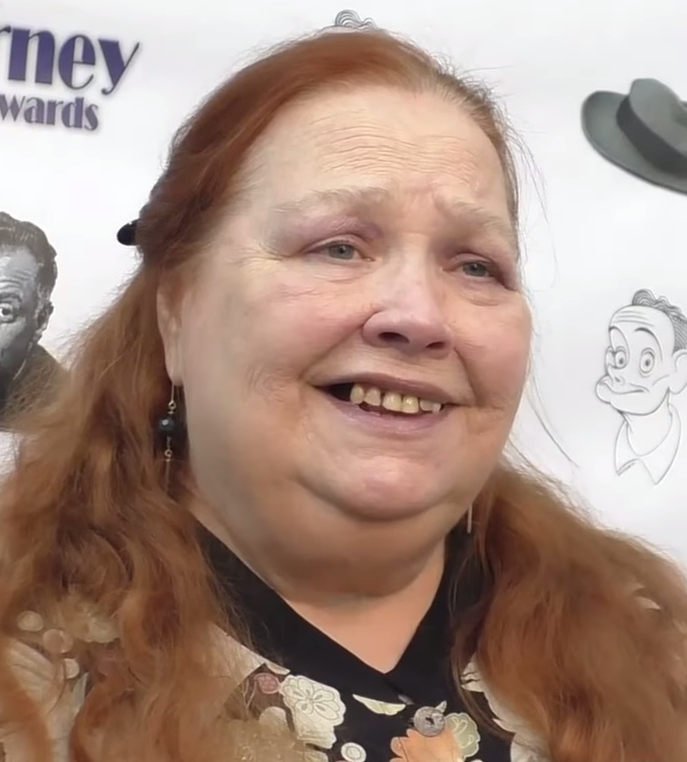
Ferrell in 2016

Ferrell's supporting roles in films include performances in Deadly Hero (1975), Network, (1976), Where the River Runs Black (1986), For Keeps (1988), Edward Scissorhands (1990), Erin Brockovich (2000), Crime and Punishment in Suburbia (2000), K-PAX (2001), and Mr. Deeds (2002), as well as a small part in True Romance (1993).

Ferrell portrayed Berta the housekeeper in the CBS sitcom Two and a Half Men, appearing in a total of 212 episodes from 2003 to 2015. She had received two nominations for a Primetime Emmy Award for Outstanding Supporting Actress in a Comedy Series in 2005 and 2007, but lost to Doris Roberts for Everybody Loves Raymond and Jaime Pressly for My Name Is Earl.

She accepted a role in the off-Broadway play Love, Loss, and What I Wore for an April 27 through May 29, 2011, run with Minka Kelly, AnnaLynne McCord, Anne Meara, and B. Smith.

In 2012, she voiced the role of Bob's Mom in Frankenweenie, which was directed by Tim Burton. In 2015, she played Aunt Dorothy in the horror-comedy Krampus. She appeared in the feature film Deported (2020), and had earlier acted in A Very Nutty Christmas (2018), a holiday-themed television film.

== Personal life ==
Ferrell married Arnie Anderson around 1986. She had a daughter, Samantha (born in 1982), and two stepdaughters (born in 1976 and 1979).

A devout, lifelong Methodist, Ferrell balanced her public life as a prominent character actress with deep ties to her faith community, holding active memberships at both the Circleville Church of Christ in Ohio and the Sherman Oaks United Methodist Church in California.

Her grounded nature mirrored her academic background; she initially pursued a political science degree at West Virginia University before shifting focus to graduate with a degree in social studies in education from Marshall University. This educational background proudly informed her lifelong allegiance to the Democratic Party, an alignment she solidified in the voting booth over decades by consistently supporting candidates like Jimmy Carter, Walter Mondale, Michael Dukakis, Bill Clinton, Hillary Clinton, Al Gore, Bill Bradley, John Kerry, and Barack Obama.

== Death ==
Ferrell died on October 12, 2020, from complications following cardiac arrest at the Sherman Oaks Hospital in Sherman Oaks, California. She was 77 years old. She was interred alongside her parents and brother in the Ferrell Family Plot at Forest Cemetery in Circleville, Ohio.

== Filmography ==
Year	Title	Role	Director	Notes	Source
1974	Maude	Rita Valdez	Hal Cooper	Episode: "Florida's Goodbye"	
1975	Hot l Baltimore	April Green	Bob LaHendro & Burt Brinckerhoff	13 episodes	
1976	Deadly Hero	Slugger Ann	Ivan Nagy		
1976	Network	Barbara Schlesinger	Sidney Lumet		
1977	The Rockford Files	Ella Mae White	Reza Badiyi	Episode: "Crack Back"	
1977	Mixed Nuts	Nurse Cassidy	Jerry Belson & Peter H. Hunt	Short	
1977	Blansky's Beauties	Nurse Gibbons	Alan Rafkin	Episode: "Nancy Breaks a Leg"	
1977	The Girl Called Hatter Fox	Nurse Rinehart	George Schaefer	TV movie	
1977	Good Times	Miss Johnson	Gerren Keith	Episode: "Willona, the Fuzz"	
1977	One Day at a Time	Phyllis McDermott	Herbert Kenwith	Episode: "The Singles Bar"	
1978	A Death in Canaan	Rita Parsons	Tony Richardson	TV movie	
1978	Who'll Save Our Children?	Dodie Hart	George Schaefer	TV movie	
1979	The Love Boat	Bitsy Sheldon	Roger Duchowny	2 episodes	
1979	Heartland	Elinore Randall Stewart	Richard Pearce		
1979	Before and After	Marge	Kim Friedman	TV movie	
1979	The Misadventures of Sheriff Lobo	The Fox	Bruce Bilson	2 episodes	
1979–1980	B. J. and the Bear	Wilhemina 'The Fox' Johnson	Several directors	5 episodes	
1980	The Seduction of Miss Leona	Hazel Dawson	Joseph Hardy	TV movie	
1980	Reunion	Toni Owens	Russ Mayberry	TV movie	
1980	Rape and Marriage: The Rideout Case	Helen	Peter Levin	TV movie	
1980	Knots Landing	Mrs. Messinger	Edward Parone	2 episodes	
1981	CBS Afternoon Playhouse	Mamie Trotter	Jeffrey Hayden	Episode: "The Great Gilly Hopkins"	
1981	McClain's Law	Vangie Cruise	Vincent McEveety	TV movie (pilot for TV series McClain's Law)	
1981	Lou Grant	Myra Wexler	Peter Levin	Episode: "Drifters"	
1982	Quincy, M.E.	Mrs. Werner	Georg Fenady	Episode: "Into the Murdering Mind"	
1982	Life of the Party: The Story of Beatrice	Captain Burnsite	Lamont Johnson	TV movie	
1982	Cagney & Lacey	Charlene	Reza Badiyi	Episode: "High Steel"	
1983	St. Elsewhere	Gina Barnett	Mark Tinker	Episode: "Hearts"	
1983	American Playhouse	Faye Doyle	Michael Dinner	Episode: "Miss Lonelyhearts"	
1983	Emergency Room	Nurse Sylvia Kaye	Lee H. Katzin	TV movie	
1984	Nadia	Mili Simonescu	Alan Cooke	TV movie	
1984	Faerie Tale Theatre	Thumbelina's Mother	Michael Lindsay-Hogg	Episode: "Thumbelina"	
1984	The Three Wishes of Billy Grier	Dr. Gardner	Corey Blechman	TV movie	
1984–1985	E/R	Nurse Joan Thor	Peter Bonerz	22 episodes	
1985	This Is the Life		Sharron Miller	Episode: "The Stranger"	
1985	North Beach and Rawhide	Doc Norman	Harry Falk	TV movie	
1986	Samaritan: The Mitch Snyder Story	Ida Sinclair	Richard T. Heffron	TV movie	
1986	Where the River Runs Black	Mother Marta	Christopher Cain		
1986	Picnic	Helen Potts	Marshall W. Mason	TV movie	
1986	Matlock	Mrs. Reese	Alan Cooke	Episode: "The Sisters"	
1987	Night Court	Nurse	Jim Drake	Episode: "Here's to You, Mrs. Robinson"	
1987	Sledge Hammer!	Judge Ida Gruff	Reza Badiyi	Episode: "Jagged Sledge"	
1987	Frank's Place	Jan Rudy	Hugh Wilson	Episode: "The Bridge"	
1987	Eye on the Sparrow	Mary	John Korty	TV movie	
1988	Hooperman	Eva Parker	Rick Wallace	Episode: "The Snitch"	
1988	For Keeps	Mrs. Bobrucz	John G. Avildsen		
1988	Who's the Boss?	Frances	James Eric Hornbeck	Episode: "Housekeepers Unite"	
1988	Sonny Spoon	Tough Habit	Dick Miller	Episode: "Tough Habit"	
1988	CBS Summer Playhouse	Kate	David Trainer	Episode: "Old Money"	
1988	Mystic Pizza	Leona	Donald Petrie		
1988	ABC Weekend Special	Aunt Jill	Ron Underwood	Episode: "Runaway Ralph"	
1988	Goodbye, Miss 4th of July	Minnie Bixby	George Miller	TV movie	
1988	Portrait of a White Marriage	Mrs. Sturgeon	Harry Shearer		
1988 & 1991–1992	L.A. Law	Susan Bloom / Lorna Landsberg	Several directors	20 episodes	
1989	A Peaceable Kingdom	Kate Galindo	Mark Waxman	10 episodes	
1989	Murder, She Wrote	Harriet Lundgren	John Llewellyn Moxey	Episode: "Something Borrowed, Someone Blue"	
1989	Your Mother Wears Combat Boots	Specialist Mononaghee	Anson Williams	TV movie	
1989	Hard Time on Planet Earth	Annie	James A. Contner	Episode: "The Hot Dog Man"	
1990	Hollywood Dog		William Dear	TV movie	
1990	Opposites Attract	Flo	Noel Nosseck	TV movie	
1990	Edward Scissorhands	Helen	Tim Burton		
1991	Deadly Intentions... Again?	Joan	James Steven Sadwith	TV movie	
1991	Chains of Gold	Martha Burke	Rod Holcomb	TV movie	
1991	Backfield in Motion	Ann Bedowski	Richard Michaels	TV movie	
1992–1995	Hearts Afire	Dr. Madeline Stoessinger / Dr. Ruth Colquist	Several directors	33 episodes	
1993	The Legend of Prince Valiant	Girl		Voice, episode: "The Sage"	
1993	Dinosaurs	Shelly	Bruce Bilson	Voice, episode: "Dirty Dancin'"	
1993	Family Prayers	Mrs. Romeyo	Scott M. Rosenfelt		
1993	Sirens	Mrs. Chattle		Episode: "Keeping the Peace"	
1993	True Romance	Mary Louise Ravencroft	Tony Scott		
1993	Cobra	Bobby Gutner	Jorge Montesi	Episode: "Honeymoon Hideaway"	
1993	Heaven & Earth	Bernice	Oliver Stone		
1994	Samurai Cowboy	Bobbi Bob Pickette	Michael Keusch		
1994	A Worn Path	Nurse	Bruce Schwartz		
1994	Duckman	Roxanne	Jeff McGrath & John Eng	Voice, 2 episodes	
1995	The Buccaneers	Mrs. Elmsworth	Philip Saville	Miniseries; episode: "Invasion"	
1995	The Mask: Animated Series	Willamina Bubask		Voice, episode: "How Much Is That Dog in the Tin Can?"	
1995	The Client	Rue	James Quinn	Episode: "The Way Things Never Were"	
1996	Freeway	Mrs. Sheets	Matthew Bright		
1996	Minor Adjustments	Mrs. Daisy Gotschel		Episode: "The Ungrateful Dead"	
1996	Walker, Texas Ranger	Lureen Smith	Michael Preece	Episode: "Miracle at Middle Creek"	
1996	Sweet Dreams	Dr. Kate Lowe	Jack Bender	TV movie	
1996	Townies	Marge	Pamela Fryman	2 episodes	
1996	My Fellow Americans	Woman Truck Driver	Peter Segal		
1997	Touch	Virginia Worrel	Paul Schrader		
1997	ABC TGIF	Pam		Episode: "Frightful Halloween Bash"	
1997	Aaahh!!! Real Monsters	Simpah	Denise Downer	Voice, episode: "Clockwise/Gromble Soup"	
1997–1998	Teen Angel	Pam	Several directors	17 episodes	
1998	Modern Vampires	Wanda	Richard Elfman	TV movie	
1998	The Naked Truth	Maxine Mansfield	Robby Benson	Episode: "Muddy for Nothing"	
1998	Buffy the Vampire Slayer	Nurse Greenliegh	David Semel	Episode: "Go Fish"	
1999	Touched by an Angel	Irene	Noel Nosseck	Episode: "The Medium and the Message"	
1999	Two Guys and a Girl	Shawn's Mother	Gil Junger	Episode: "Two Guys, a Girl and Valentine's Day"	
1999	JAG	Deanne	Terrence O'Hara	Episode: "Second Sight"	
1999	Friends	The Judge	Gary Halvorson	Episode: "The One with Joey's Porsche"	
1999	Chicken Soup for the Soul	Mrs. Patterson		Episode: "Crying's Okay"	
2000	Crime and Punishment in Suburbia	Bella	Rob Schmidt		
2000	Erin Brockovich	Brenda	Steven Soderbergh		
2000	Get Real	Rosa Hernandez	Richard Compton	Episode: "Support"	
2000	Pensacola	Helen Wilson	Sidney J. Furie	Episode: "Answered Prayers"	
2000	Buzz Lightyear of Star Command	Ma Munchapper	Steve Loter	Voice, 3 episodes	
2000, 2003	The Wild Thornberrys	Harriet, Grizzly Bear	Carol Millican & Dean Crisswell	Voice, 2 episodes	
2001	Stranger Inside	Mama Cass	Cheryl Dunye	TV movie	
2001	Popular	Calamity Jones	Ryan Murphy	Episode: "The News of My Death Has Been Greatly Exaggerated"	
2001	The Zeta Project	Dr. Greer	Rob Davies	Voice, episode: "The Next Gen"	
2001	Amy & Isabelle	Bev	Lloyd Kramer	TV movie	
2001	Going to California	Nurse Lucy	D.j. Caruso	Episode: "I Know Why the Caged Rhino Sings"	
2001	ER	Mrs. Jenkins	Christopher Misiano	Episode: "Four Corners"	
2001	K-PAX	Betty McAllister	Iain Softley		
2002	Sabrina the Teenage Witch	Bus Driver	Beth Broderick	Episode: "Guilty!"	
2002	Mr. Deeds	Jan	Steven Brill		
2002	Lloyd in Space	Miss Effluvium	Howy Parkins	Voice, episode: "Incident at Luna Vista"	
2002	Push, Nevada	Martha	Lisa Cholodenko	Episode: "The Letter of the Law"	
2003	Becker	Zora	Chris Brougham	Episode: "Ms. Fortune"	
2003	Judging Amy	Maxine's Co-Worker	Alan Myerson	Episode: "Kilt Trip"	
2003–2015	Two and a Half Men	Berta	Several directors	Recurring role (season 1); Main role (seasons 2–12)	
2004	Surviving Eden	Rosemary Flotchky	Greg Pritikin		
2007	Kabluey	Kathleen	Scott Prendergast		
2012	Frankenweenie	Bob's Mom	Tim Burton	Voice	
2013	Not That, But Something Like That		Benjamin Hasko	Short	
2014	Postal Jerks	Carmelita	James Skinner	TV movie	
2014	The Axe Murders of Villisca	Mrs. Flanks	Tony E. Valenzuela		
2014	Wishin' and Hopin'	Sister Agrippina	Colin Theys	TV movie	
2015	Krampus	Aunt Dorothy	Michael Dougherty		
2016	Grace and Frankie	Grandma Jean	Trent O'Donnell	Episode: "The Negotiation"	
2016	The Axe Murders of Villisca	Mrs. Flanks	Tony E. Valenzuela		
2017	The Ranch	Shirley	Don Reo & Jim Patterson	5 episodes	
2018	A Very Nutty Christmas	Clara	Colin Theys	TV movie	
2020	Deported	Betsy	Tyler Spindel	Posthumous release	

== Awards and nominations ==
Year	Award	Category	Title of work	Result	Source
1974	Drama Desk Award	Outstanding Performance	The Sea Horse	Won	
1974	Theatre World Award	Best Performance	The Sea Horse	Won	
1974	Obie Award	Best Actress	The Sea Horse	Won	
1981	Western Heritage Awards	Bronze Wrangler	Heartland (shared with cast)	Won	
1992	Primetime Emmy Award	Outstanding Supporting Actress in a Drama Series	L.A. Law	Nominated	
2005	Primetime Emmy Award	Outstanding Supporting Actress in a Comedy Series	Two and a Half Men	Nominated	
2007	Primetime Emmy Award	Outstanding Supporting Actress in a Comedy Series	Two and a Half Men	Nominated	
2009	TV Land Award	Future Classic	Two and a Half Men (shared with Mark Burg, Jon Cryer, Angus T. Jones, Chuck Lorre, Charlie Sheen and Holland Taylor)	Won	
