= Your Three Minutes Are Up =

1973 film directed by Douglas N. Schwartz

- film poster
- Directed by: Douglas Schwartz
- Written by: James Dixon
- Produced by: Jerry Gershwin; Mark C. Levy
- Starring: Beau Bridges; Ron Leibman; Janet Margolin
- Cinematography: Stephen M. Katz
- Edited by: Aaron Stell
- Music by: Perry Botkin Jr.
- Distributed by: Cinerama Releasing Corporation
- Release date: August 1973
- Running time: 93 minutes
- Language: English

Your Three Minutes Are Up is a 1973 American road movie starring Beau Bridges and Ron Leibman.

== Plot ==
Charlie is a sad sack of a man, working at a depressingly dull office job and stuck in a passionless engagement to a neurotic woman. One of the few bright spots in his life is his friend Mike, who seems to be living a life of carefree bohemianism. When the two end up on a long road trip together, they are forced to re-examine their lives and worldviews. Mike may have independence in some ways, but it has come at a price. Charlie, in turn, may feel trapped, but how much of the trap is of his own making?

== Cast ==
- Beau Bridges as Charlie
- Ron Leibman as Mike
- Janet Margolin as Betty
- Kathleen Freeman as Mrs. Wilk
- David Ketchum as Mr. Kellogg
- Stuart Nisbet as Dr. Claymore
- Read Morgan as Eddie Abruzzi
- Sherry Bain as Sugar
- June Fairchild as Sandi
- Larry Gelman as Mr. Roberts
- Lynne Marie Stewart as Ibis Lady
- Nedra Volz as Free Press Lady

== Production ==
The film was based on an original screenplay by actor James Dixon, who would go on to a long collaboration with filmmaker Larry Cohen as both actor and screenwriter. Director Douglas Schwartz would work extensively in television, where he would become best known as the creator of the long-running series Baywatch.

The film was mostly ignored when it came out in August 1973, but reviews were largely positive. Writing in The Washington Post, critic Gary Arnold called it “a surprisingly bright and enjoyable comedy, with serious undertones … The material takes funnier turns and develops more dramatic intensity than one anticipates.” In his Movie Guide, Leonard Maltin wrote that it was an “unpretentious film [that] says more about our society than many more ‘important’ movies.”
