= Zorro, The Gay Blade =

1981 feature film directed by Peter Medak

- Theatrical release poster
- Directed by: Peter Medak
- Written by: Hal Dresner; Greg Alt; Don Moriarty; Bob Randall
- Produced by: C. O. Erickson; George Hamilton
- Starring: George Hamilton; Lauren Hutton; Brenda Vaccaro; Ron Leibman
- Cinematography: John A. Alonzo
- Edited by: Lori Jane Coleman
- Music by: Ian Fraser
- Production companies: Melvin Simon Productions; Estudios Churubusco Azteca S.A.
- Distributed by: 20th Century Fox
- Release date: July 17, 1981
- Running time: 93 minutes
- Countries: United States; Mexico
- Language: English
- Budget: $12.6 million
- Box office: $10 million

Zorro, The Gay Blade is a 1981 swashbuckling comedy film from 20th Century Fox, produced by C.O. Erickson and George Hamilton, directed by Peter Medak, that stars Hamilton, Lauren Hutton, Ron Leibman, and Brenda Vaccaro. The film is an international co-production between the United States and Mexico.

The film's opening prologue states: "This film is dedicated to Rouben Mamoulian and the other great filmmakers whose past gives us our future."

The prologue quickly establishes that Zorro, The Gay Blade is a tongue-in-cheek sequel to 20th Century Fox's swashbuckling adventure film The Mark of Zorro (1940), directed by Mamoulian.

Hamilton was nominated for a Golden Globe Award for Best Actor in a Motion Picture – Musical or Comedy at the 39th Golden Globe Awards for playing the dual role of Don Diego de la Vega (Zorro) and his gay twin brother Bunny Wigglesworth, aka Ramón de la Vega.

== Plot ==
In 1840s Madrid, Spain, Don Diego de la Vega is in bed with a married woman. They are caught by her husband, Garcia, and Diego must sword fight with him and his five brothers. During the altercation, Diego's mute servant Paco reads (via gestures) a letter from Diego's father ordering Diego's return to California. Diego and Paco jump from a high wall into a waiting carriage.

When the two arrive in Los Angeles months later, they are met by Diego's childhood friend Esteban, who is now captain of the guard. He has married Florinda, for whom the men competed when they were boys. Diego learns that his father was killed in a riding accident, his horse "frightened by a turtle". Esteban is the acting alcalde until the Dons elect a replacement, and Diego sees he has been horribly oppressing the peasants of California via exorbitant taxes and torture.

Esteban is elected by acclamation and then gives a speech to the assembled peasants. He is interrupted by Charlotte Taylor-Wilson, a wealthy political activist from Boston. She and Diego meet, and despite their political differences, Diego is smitten.

Diego is invited to a masked ball celebrating Esteban's elevation. He also receives his inheritance: Zorro's black cape, hat, and sword, along with a letter from his late father revealing that he was Zorro. That legacy now falls to Diego. He decides the masked ball is the perfect place to announce Zorro's return. On his way there, Zorro witnesses a peasant being extorted. He confronts and defeats Esteban's tax collector, then instructs the peasant to spread the word that El Zorro has returned.

Diego, in Zorro costume, dances with Florinda at the ball. Velasquez, the tax collector, reports the theft to Esteban, pointing to Diego as Zorro. A duel ensues with Esteban, and Zorro escapes by again jumping from a high wall, but this time injuring his foot and hobbling away.

Later that night, a drunken Florinda attempts to seduce Diego at his hacienda, but Esteban arrives to speak about the evening's events. He suspects that Diego might be Zorro, but Diego convinces him that his foot is uninjured.

A reign of terror begins, including torture and increased taxation. Diego is frustrated because, being injured, he cannot fight Esteban's tyranny. Fate intervenes when Diego's gay, foppish, and British-educated twin brother Ramón de la Vega, a Royal Navy officer having adopted the name "Bunny Wigglesworth", comes home for a visit. Diego brings him up to date, and Bunny assumes the guise of Zorro, using a whip instead of a sword, while wearing flamboyant Zorro attire in a variety of coordinated colors.

The colorful Zorro always eludes capture, deeply impressing both the people and Charlotte. Esteban hatches a plan to lure Zorro to the alcalde's residence with another ball to show off Florinda's expensive new necklace. Seeing through the plan, Diego arrives dressed as Zorro. So do the rest of the Dons and male party guests, saying that a message from Esteban instructed them all to dress that way. Adding to the confusion, Bunny appears in drag, masquerading as "Margarita" Wigglesworth, Diego's cousin from Santa Barbara. Esteban is smitten upon meeting her. Bunny spills a drink on Florinda, and in the resulting chaos attempts to clean her dress, and makes off with the necklace. As Bunny leaves to return to the Royal Navy, he tells Diego that Charlotte has confessed her love for Zorro.

At the plaza, Diego (as Zorro) and Charlotte meet again, falling into each other's arms, but they are observed and Esteban is informed. As a ruse to lure Zorro, he has Charlotte arrested, and she is sentenced to be executed. Don Diego as Zorro surrenders to Esteban to save her, and he is sentenced to death.

Seconds before the firing squad opens fire, Bunny, this time wearing a bright metallic gold costume, announces the return of Zorro with a rhyme, "Two bits, four bits, six bits, a peso. All for Zorro, stand up and say so!" With Charlotte's and Diego's aid, Zorro incites the assembled peasants to rebellion. Esteban's guards also rebel, joined by Florinda, and Esteban stands alone, defeated. Later, Bunny finally rides off to catch his ship back to Britain, waving goodbye, after which Diego and Charlotte ride off to plan their wedding. As her wedding gift, Charlotte suggests that Diego donate all his family lands to the people, so they can settle down and raise a family in Boston.

== Cast ==
- George Hamilton as Don Diego de la Vega / Zorro / Bunny Wigglesworth / Ramón de la Vega
- Lauren Hutton as Charlotte Taylor-Wilson
- Brenda Vaccaro as Florinda
- Ron Leibman as Captain Esteban
- Donovan Scott as Paco
- James Booth as Velasquez
- Helen Burns as Consuelo
- Clive Revill as Garcia
- Carolyn Seymour as Dolores
- Eduardo Noriega as Don Francisco
- Pilar Pellicer as Don Francisco's wife
- Jorge Russek as Don Fernando
- Eduardo Alcaraz as Don Jose
- Carlos Bravo y Fernández as Don Luis Obispo
- Roberto Dumont as Ferraro
- Jorge Bolio as Pablito
- Frank Welker as Narrator (in voice-over)

== Development ==
The film began life as a screenplay by future screenwriter and teacher David Trottier, titled Zorro, the Comedy Adventure. Trottier had little involvement with the finished film, barring some minor additions, so was not credited.

George Hamilton was cast as Zorro in the film after his success in Love at First Bite.

== Music ==
The opening credits read: ”Music conducted and adapted by Ian Fraser” and the end credits: “Music adapted from Adventures of Don Juan (1948) by Max Steiner [and] Danzes Fantastica by Joaquín Turina”.

== Critical reception ==
Vincent Canby gave a mostly positive review in The New York Times, praising many of the performances in particular: "George Hamilton has energy and extreme good will. He also has surrounded himself with some very attractive and funny actors, particularly Mr. Leibman, Brenda Vaccaro, as the alcalde's sex-hungry wife, and beautiful Lauren Hutton."

In contrast, Roger Ebert of The Chicago Sun-Times gave a 2 star review to Zorro, the Gay Blade. He said Hamilton was a skilled comic actor and the film had some good moments but overall was not as funny as Love at First Bite, a previous spoof starring Hamilton, because "it never provides a comprehensive story to hold the jokes together". The original Zorro movies "were [unintentionally] funny as long as they played it straight [with] their ridiculous codes and vows and pledges of loyalty", Ebert wrote, but intentionally aiming for laughs in a satirical Zorro movie was simply not effective.

The film holds a rating of 50% on Rotten Tomatoes from 16 reviews.
