= Where the River Runs Black =

- Theatrical release poster
- Directed by: Christopher Cain
- Screenplay by: Neal Jimenez & Peter Silverman
- Based on: Lazaro by David Kendall
- Produced by: Joe Roth; Harry J. Ufland
- Starring: Charles Durning; Peter Horton; Dana Delany
- Cinematography: Juan Ruiz Anchía
- Edited by: Richard Chew
- Music by: James Horner
- Production company: Metro-Goldwyn-Mayer
- Distributed by: MGM Entertainment Co.
- Release date: September 19, 1986
- Running time: 100 minutes
- Country: United States
- Language: English
- Box office: $676,166 (US)

Where the River Runs Black is a 1986 American drama film directed by Christopher Cain and starring Charles Durning, Peter Horton, and Dana Delany. The screenplay was written by Neal Jimenez and Peter Silverman, based on the novel Lazaro by David Kendall.

== Plot ==
Brazil, 1976. Father Mahoney is a missionary priest in the Amazon, and on occasion reports to his superior, Father O'Reilly, who disapproves of his plans to save the indigenous people of the area through medicine and development. He is instead encouraged to focus on saving souls. After a final and disappointing meeting with Father O'Reilly, Father Mahoney ventures by canoe into the black waters of the Amazon only to encounter an Indian woman (Divana Brandão) living in the jungle, the same one he has seen before and who he claims continues to tempt him. Known through local folklore as a seductive spirit who can change into a river dolphin, Father Mahoney is overcome by his desire during this particular encounter and is intimate with the woman. Before leaving, he gives to her the crucifix from around his neck. On his return to the missionary that same day, Father Mahoney is killed by an anaconda, never knowing the woman he left behind is now pregnant. The woman raises her son alone in the jungle where he grows up in an idyllic existence, swimming with the river dolphins. One day, the mother is discovered by a band of hunters using a motorized boat, and during a struggle she is killed. Led by Orlando Santos, the group of men and their murderous act are witnessed by the child in the forest. They grab the boy and toss him into the river. No longer seeing the boy, they assume he has drowned and depart. Moments later, the river dolphins come to his rescue and take him to shore. At age six, he is left to fend for himself in the forest.

Over the years a story of a feral child spreads through the towns along the river, and when the boy is ten he is captured and taken to town. The capture of the "dolphin boy" comes to the attention of Father O'Reilly. When he sees that the boy is wearing Mahoney's crucifix he realizes that he is Mahoney's child. With great excitement that part of Mahoney has lived on, O'Reilly takes in and baptizes the boy, who does not speak or understand language. O'Reilly names him Lazaro and places him in an orphanage run by nuns. There the boy learns to speak and is befriended by an older boy called Segundo. Father O'Reilly continues to visit Lazaro, usually taking him out for ice cream and teaching him Christian values, such as the concept of forgiveness, particularly toward the men that killed his mother.

The orphans are presented to a benefactor of the orphanage, a successful businessman who is also a candidate for governor of the province. Lazaro recognizes the benefactor as Orlando Santos, the man who killed his mother. Lazaro runs away from the orphanage, intent on finding Santos and killing him. Segundo insists on going with him. Father O'Reilly learns that Lazaro has run away and begins to search for him. Lazaro and Segundo survive by shining shoes on the streets while they search for Santos. They narrowly elude Father O'Reilly at an ice cream stand he had previously frequented with Lazaro. They follow a campaign vehicle to Santos's house, where a political fundraiser is underway. Santos is giving a speech to his guests when Lazaro impulsively takes a sharpened stake from the garden and uses it as a spear, hurling it at Santos's head in front of all of his guests. It narrowly misses. Lazaro makes his escape, but Segundo is caught by Santos's security people. Santos questions Segundo, and comes to realize that Lazaro is the boy from the jungle and can link him to his long-ago crime.

Santos sends Segundo to a quarry he owns to serve as an indentured laborer - and as a lure for Lazaro. Sure enough, Lazaro turns up at the quarry and helps Segundo to escape. Together they head into the jungle, intending to return to Lazaro's childhood home by the river. Santos tracks them through the jungle. Meanwhile, Father O'Reilly travels up the Amazon by boat, acting on a hunch that Lazaro might return to his forest home. Lazaro reaches the banks of the river and is reunited with his childhood environment and the wild river dolphins. While walking with Segundo on a forest trail leading to his old home, Santos catches up with him, grabbing him from behind, carrying him into the river where he tries to drown him. But Lazaro is saved when the river dolphins he grew up with attack Santos, butting him with their snouts and causing him to drown. Father O'Reilly arrives on the scene and is highly conflicted as he feels he should save the drowning man in front of him whose hand is now reaching out for help, but chooses to do nothing knowing he just tried to kill Lazaro. Santos slowly drowns from his injuries. Father O'Reilly is reunited with Lazaro, but ultimately leaves him in the forest from where he came. It is not known what becomes of Segundo, but the assumption is that he returns to the city and leaves his friend in the forest. Now legendary among the people of the community, Lazaro is said to be seen at times still living in the jungle and playing with the river dolphins - while also thought to be able to turn into one himself.

The film begins and ends through the narration of Father O'Reilly, while at confession and seeking his own forgiveness for letting a man die when he could have saved him.

== Principal cast ==
Actor	Role
Charles Durning	Father O'Reilly
Peter Horton	Father Mahoney
Dana Delany	Sister Ana
Alessandro Rabelo	Lazaro (age 10)
Marcelo Rabelo	Lazaro (age 6)
Ajay Naidu	Segundo
Divana Brandão	Eagle Woman
Cástulo Guerra	Orlando Santos
Conchata Ferrell	Mother Marta

== Production ==
The film was entirely shot in Brazil, mostly in Belém and Rio Negro, Manaus.

== Critical reception ==
Walter Goodman of The New York Times described Where the River Runs Black as a children's film with incredibly slow pacing:

Where the River Runs Black is strictly for the kids. Kids with patience, that is, for this movie... seems to be in slow motion even when it's not. Christopher Cain, the director, lets the story dawdle while the camera basks in the Brazilian sun streaming through trees or shutters or church windows..... With about 15 minutes to go... the story picks up pace... but by now, I'm afraid, the kids may have dozed off.

Roger Ebert of the Chicago Sun-Times enjoyed the film and rated it 3 stars out of his 4 star rating system and had praise for Cain's direction:

Here is a fable with the most unlikely ingredients, and yet, like all fables, it will work if we allow it to... Told in the wrong way, "Where the River Runs Black" could very easily seem silly. But the director, Christopher Cain, tells it with a dreamy inevitability, and for me, at least, the spell worked.
