= Piggie (film) =

- Directed by: Alison Bagnall
- Written by: Savannah Haske; Alison Bagnall
- Produced by: Alison Dickey
- Starring: Savannah Haske
- Cinematography: Rufus Standefer
- Edited by: Cushla Dillon
- Music by: Dusty Trails; Sean Wareham
- Release date: 2003
- Running time: 98 minutes
- Country: United States
- Language: English

Piggie is a 2003 American drama film written by Savannah Haske and Alison Bagnall, directed by Bagnall and starring Haske.

== Cast ==
- Savannah Haske as Fannie
- Robert John Burke as Dad
- Dean Wareham as Nile
- John C. Reilly as Russell

== Reception ==
The film has a 60% rating on Rotten Tomatoes based on five reviews.

Noel Murray of The A.V. Club gave the film a negative review and wrote, “Remember when independent filmmakers made movies about people who actually exist?”
