= Loudendale, West Virginia =

- Unincorporated community
- Location within West Virginia and the United States Loudendale (the United States)
- Coordinates: 38°18′14″N 81°39′10″W
- Country: United States
- State: West Virginia
- County: Kanawha
- Elevation: 666 ft (203 m)
- Time zone: UTC-5 (Eastern (EST))
  - Summer (DST): UTC-4 (EDT)
- GNIS ID: 1542476

Loudendale is an unincorporated community in Kanawha County, West Virginia, United States. It is located near Kanawha State Forest with access to Charleston, the state capital, by way of Pennington Hill or Coal Hollow.

== Notable natives and residents ==
- Conchata Ferrell - film and television actress
