= Richard Walter (writer) =

American dramatist

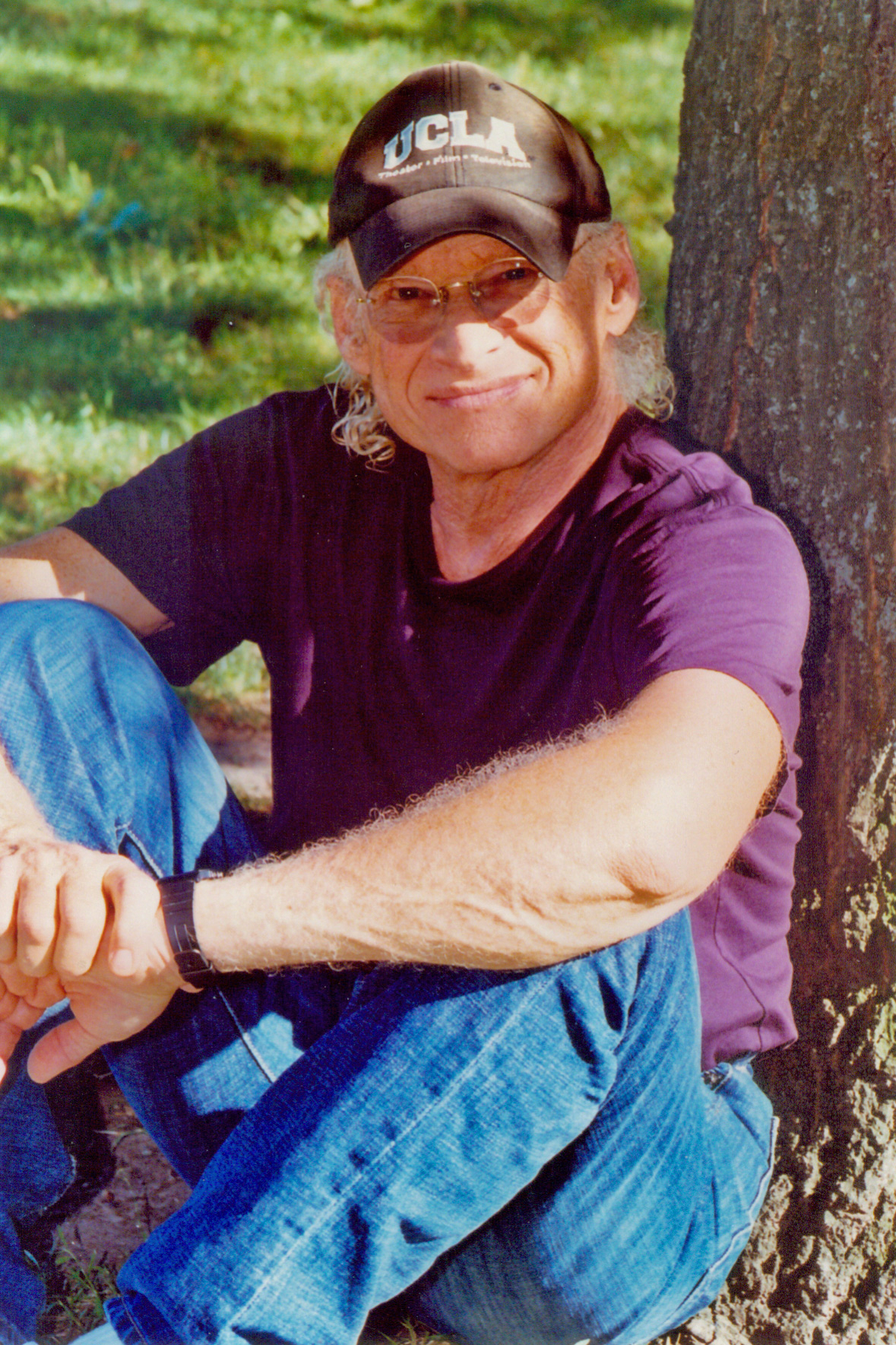
- Occupations: Author, educator, screenwriter, commentator, consultant
- Known for: Screenwriting: The Art, Craft and Business of Film and Television Writing
- Spouse: Patricia Sandgrund
- Children: 2
- Relatives: Jessica Walter (sister)

Richard Walter is an American author, educator, screenwriter, commentator, consultant, and chairman of the University of California, Los Angeles graduate program in screenwriting.

He has written several works, including the Essentials of Screenwriting, published in June 2010, and the novels Escape from Film School and Barry and the Persuasions. Other publications include screenwriting books The Whole Picture: Strategies for Screenwriting Success in the New Hollywood and Screenwriting: The Art, Craft and Business of Film and Television Writing.

== Career ==
Walter lectures on screenwriting and storytelling throughout North America and the world. He has written numerous feature assignments for the major studios and has sold material to all of the Big Three television networks. He has also written many informational, educational and corporate films, and is a 30-year member of the Writers Guild of America. He has conducted master classes in London, Paris, Jerusalem, Madrid, Rio de Janeiro, Mexico City, Beijing and Hong Kong.

Walter is also a pop culture critic and media pundit on entertainment history-related topics, such as anti-Americanism and Hollywood, screenwriting as a career, film production and politics. Walter is also a court authorized expert in intellectual property law, in particular plagiarism and copyright infringement.

In December 2024, Walter published his latest work Deadpan, a satire novel released by Hersey Press. The novel was inspired by Kafka's The Metamorphosis in which a man wakes up to turn into an insect. Walter used this inspiration to turn his main character in the book who wakes up one day and transform from a car dealer who has anti-semitic views into an accomplished Jewish stand-up comedian.

== Personal life ==
Walter's sister was actress Jessica Walter.

Walter is married to Patricia Sandgrund, with whom he has two children.

== Students ==
Students from Walter’s screenwriting program at UCLA have written projects for Steven Spielberg, and many successful Hollywood productions, including three Academy Awards for best screenplay: Dustin Lance Black for Milk and Alexander Payne for Sideways and The Descendants. Other past students of the UCLA program under Walter's direction include these television and film screenwriters:

- Sacha Gervasi – The Terminal
- Dan Mazeau – Wrath of the Titans
- Felicia Henderson – Fringe, Gossip Girl, Soul Food (television series), Everybody Hates Chris, Fresh Prince of Bel-Air, Single Ladies
- Caroline Williams – The Office, Modern Family
- Don Payne – The Simpsons, Fantastic Four: Rise of the Silver Surfer, Thor (2011) and its sequel Thor: The Dark World
- Paul Castro – August Rush
- Tom Shadyac – I Now Pronounce You Chuck & Larry, Bruce Almighty, Dragonfly, Nutty Professor II: The Klumps, Ace Ventura: Pet Detective, Liar Liar
- David Koepp – Jurassic Park, Spider-Man, Carlito’s Way, War of the Worlds, Angels & Demons
- Gregory Widen – Highlander, Backdraft
- Scott Rosenberg – Beautiful Girls, Things to Do in Denver When You’re Dead, High Fidelity
- Scott Kosar – Amityville Horror, Texas Chainsaw Massacre, The Crazies, The Machinist
- Audrey Wells – The Game Plan, Shall We Dance?, Under the Tuscan Sun, The Kid, George of the Jungle, The Truth About Cats & Dogs
