= Savannah Haske =

American actress and writer

- Occupation: Actress
- Years active: 1997–2004

Savannah Haske is a former American television and film actress and writer. She is perhaps best known for her role in the television series Third Watch as Tatiana Deschenko.

== Filmography ==
Film and Television
Year	Title	Role	Notes
2004	She Hate Me	Rachel	Movie
2004	Surviving Eden	Sister Agnes O'Malley	Documentary Film
2003	10-8: Officers on Duty	Carla Justo	#1.4 "Badlands"
2003	Piggie	Fannie	Movie
2003	JAG (TV series)	Airman Anne Rodino	#8.16 "Heart and Soul"
2000– 2002	Third Watch	Tatiana Deschenko	TV series
2002	Broken	Robyn McFadden	Short Film
2001	Hostage Rescue Team	Special Agent Remy Stanhope	TV movie
2001	The Girl Under the Waves	Savannah	Movie
1997	Dating	Holly	Movie
