= Ron Leibman =

American actor (1937–2019)

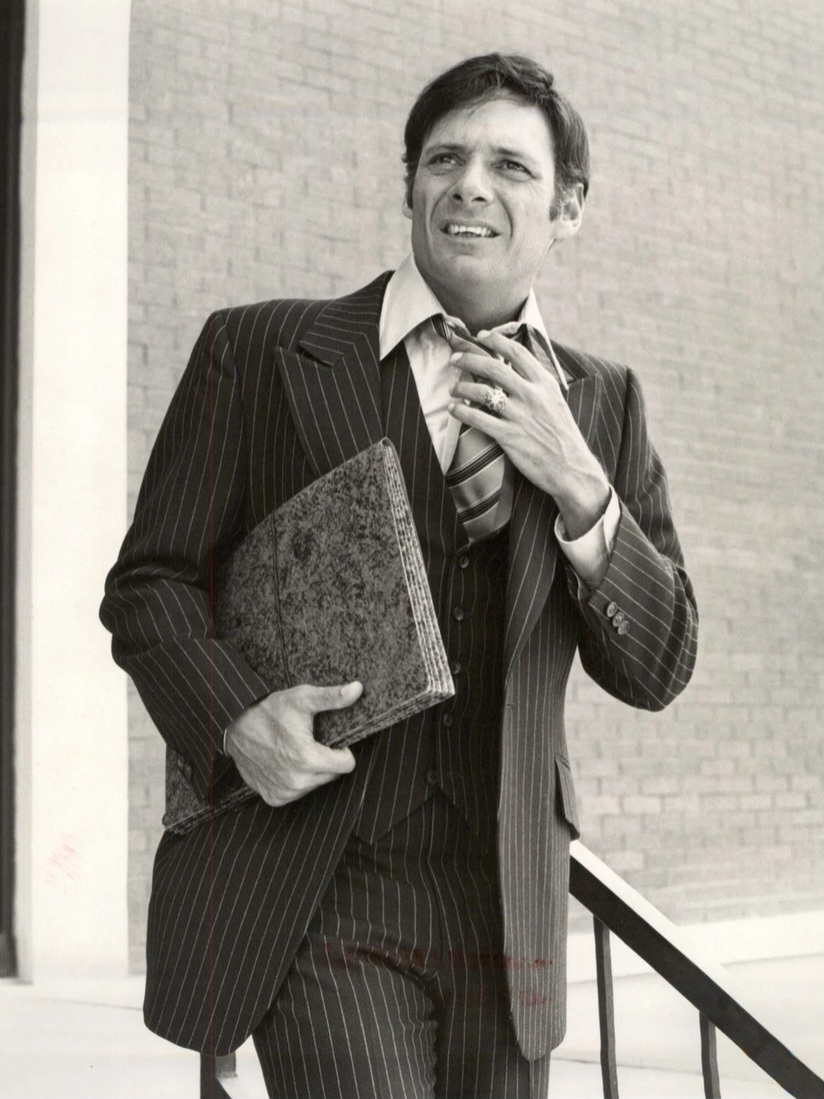
- Leibman in Kaz, 1978
- Born: October 11, 1937; New York City, U.S.
- Died: December 6, 2019 (aged 82); New York City, U.S.
- Education: Ohio Wesleyan University
- Occupation: Actor
- Years active: 1963–2016
- Spouses: Linda Lavin (m. 1969; div. 1981); Jessica Walter (m. 1983)

Ron Leibman (/ˈliːbmən/; October 11, 1937 – December 6, 2019) was an American actor. He won both the Tony Award for Best Actor in a Play and the Drama Desk Award for Outstanding Actor in a Play in 1993 for his performance as Roy Cohn in Angels in America. Leibman also won a Primetime Emmy Award in 1979 for his role as Martin 'Kaz' Kazinsky in his short-lived crime drama series Kaz.

Leibman appeared in films such as Where's Poppa? (1970), The Hot Rock (1972), Norma Rae (1979), and Zorro, The Gay Blade (1981). Later in his career, he became widely known for his recurring role as Dr. Leonard Green on Friends (1994–2004), and for providing the voice of Ron Cadillac on Archer (2013–2016).

== Early life ==
Leibman was born October 11, 1937, in Manhattan to Grace (née Marks), who was of Russian-Jewish descent, and Murray Leibman, a Russian-Jewish immigrant who worked in the garment business. Leibman graduated from Ohio Wesleyan University.

== Career ==
Leibman was a member of the Compass Players in the late 1950s, and he was admitted to the Actors Studio shortly thereafter.

Leibman made his film debut alongside George Segal in the dark comedy Where's Poppa? (1970). He then starred alongside Robert Redford and Segal in the heist film The Hot Rock (1972) and he was featured as a northern Jewish union organizer in the award-winning film Norma Rae (1979). In 1980, he starred in Up The Academy, a "gross-out" comedy set at a reform school and produced by Mad magazine. (Reaction to the film was so poor that it was repudiated by both Mad and Leibman himself, who had his name expunged from the credits and promotional material.)

His other film appearances include Slaughterhouse-Five (1972), Your Three Minutes Are Up (1973) with Beau Bridges and Janet Margolin, Zorro, The Gay Blade (1981), Auto Focus (2002) and Garden State (2004). A TV movie role of Leibman's was the 1988 legal thriller Terrorist On Trial where he plays a Jewish lawyer who defends an Arab defendant accused of a terrorist attack in Spain and extracted to Virginia. Leibman costars in that with Robert Davi as the defendant, and Sam Waterston as the prosecuting attorney. It may be found as In The Hands Of The Enemy.

Leibman won an Emmy Award, Outstanding Lead Actor In A Drama Series, in 1979 for his convict-turned-lawyer character in Kaz (1978–79), a series which he also created and co-wrote. He was later nominated for a Golden Globe for Best Supporting Actor for the role of Morris Huffner in Christmas Eve.

He co-starred with his second wife, Jessica Walter, in Tartuffe at the Los Angeles Theatre Center in 1986, and they co-starred again in Neil Simon's play Rumors in 1988 on Broadway. They also appeared together as husband and wife in the film Dummy (2003) and in the TV series Law & Order in the episode "House Counsel" in 1995.

Leibman received a 1993 Tony Award for his performance as Roy Cohn in the Pulitzer Prize-winning play Angels in America.

He played Dr. Leonard Green, Rachel Green's overbearing father, on the sitcom Friends. He had a recurring role on The Sopranos as Dr. Plepler. In 1983, Leibman starred in the Australian film Phar Lap as David J. Davis, the owner of legendary New Zealand/Australian racehorse Phar Lap, which won the 1930 Melbourne Cup and the 1932 Agua Caliente Handicap.

In 2013, Leibman began appearing as a recurring character on the TV series Archer as Ron Cadillac, the husband to Malory Archer, voiced by his real-life wife Jessica Walter.

From 2005 until his death, Leibman taught at The New School for Drama in New York City.

== Personal life ==
Leibman was married twice. His first wife was actress Linda Lavin, to whom he was married from 1969 to 1981. In 1983, he married actress Jessica Walter. They remained married until his death in 2019.

== Death ==
Leibman died from complications of pneumonia in Manhattan on December 6, 2019, at age 82.

== Filmography ==
=== Film ===
Year	Title	Role	Notes
1970	Where's Poppa?	Sidney Hocheiser	Film debut
1972	The Hot Rock	Murch	
1972	Slaughterhouse-Five	Paul Lazzaro	
1973	Your Three Minutes Are Up	Mike	American version of the classic Il Sorpasso (1962)
1974	The Super Cops	David Greenberg	
1976	Won Ton Ton: The Dog Who Saved Hollywood	Rudy Montague	
1979	Norma Rae	Reuben	
1980	Up the Academy	Major Vaughn Liceman	Uncredited; Nominated – The Stinkers Bad Movie Award for Worst Supporting Actor
1981	Zorro: The Gay Blade	Esteban	The Stinkers Bad Movie Award for Worst Supporting Actor; The Stinkers Bad Movie Award for Worst On-Screen Couple (shared with Brenda Vaccaro)
1983	Phar Lap	Dave Davis	
1983	Romantic Comedy	Leo	
1984	Door to Door	Larry Price	
1984	Rhinestone	Freddie Ugo	Nominated – Golden Raspberry Award for Worst Supporting Actor
1988	Seven Hours to Judgment	David Reardon	
1996	Night Falls on Manhattan	Morgenstern	
1999	Just the Ticket	Barry the Book	
2002	Personal Velocity	Arvam Herskowitz	Also known as Personal Velocity: Three Portraits
2002	Dummy	Lou	
2002	Auto Focus	Lenny	
2004	Garden State	Dr. Cohen	
2010	A Little Help	Warren Dunning	

=== Television ===
Year	Title	Role	Notes
1963	The DuPont Show of the Week	Carmatti	Episode: "Ride with Terror"
1963	Ride with Terror	Carmatti	Television film
1964	The Edge of Night	Johnny	Television debut
1966	Hawk	Eddie Toll	Episode: "The Man Who Owned Everyone"
1975	The Art of Crime	Roman Grey	Television film
1975	Police Story	Ray Oberstar	Episode: "Vice: 24 Hours"
1977	Martinelli, Outside Man	Richie Martinelli	Television film
1978	A Question of Guilt	Detective Louis Kazinsky	Television film
1978–79	Kaz	Martin 'Kaz' Kazinsky	Series regular / also writer; 23 episodes Primetime Emmy Award for Outstanding Lead Actor in a Drama Series
1980	Linda in Wonderland	Guest	Musical variety television special
1981	Rivkin: Bounty Hunter	Rivkin	Television film
1985	Comedy Story	Joey Caruso	Episode: "Side by Side", also writer
1986	Many Happy Returns	Jerry Brenner	Television film
1986	Christmas Eve	Morris Huffner	Television film Nominated – Golden Globe Award for Best Supporting Actor in a Series, Miniseries or a Motion Picture Made for Television
1987	ABC Afterschool Specials	Sam Greene	Episode: "Class Act: A Teacher's Story"
1988	Terrorist on Trial: The United States vs. Sam Ajami	Simon Resnick	Television film; aka Hostile Witness
1988	Aaron's Way	Unknown	Episode: "The Men Will Cheer and the Boys Will Shout"
1990–92	Murder, She Wrote	Darryl Heyward / Roland Trent	2 episodes
1991–92	Pacific Station	Detective Al Burkhardt	Series regular; 13 episodes
1992	Fish Police		Voice, episode: "The Codfather"
1995	Duckman	Geofredo	Voice, Episode: "Papa Oom M.O.W. M.O.W."
1995–96	Central Park West	Allen Rush	Voice, 21 episodes
1995–2000	Law & Order	Barry Nathanson / Mark Paul Kopell	2 episodes
1996–2004	Friends	Dr. Leonard Green	Recurring role; 4 episodes
1996	Rugrats	Rabbi / Old Man	Voice, episode: "Chanukah"
1997	Don King: Only in America	Harry Shondor	Television film
1998–2002	Holding the Baby	Stan Peterson	Series regular; 13 episodes
2001	Law & Order: Special Victims Unit	Stan Villani	Recurring role; 4 episodes
2003	The Practice	Attorney Robert Colby	Episode: "Concealing Evidence"
2006	The Sopranos	Dr. Lior Plepler	Recurring role; 3 episodes
2013–16	Archer	Ron Cadillac	Voice, recurring role; 9 episodes

=== Stage ===
Year	Title	Role	Notes
1959	Camino Real	Kilroy	
1959	Legend of Lovers	Orpheus	
1959	A View From the Bridge	Rudolfo	
1960	Dead End	Unknown	
1960	The Premise	Unknown	
1963	Dear Me, The Sky is Falling	Peter Nemo	
1963	Bicycle Ride to Nevada	Rip Calabria	
1964	The Deputy	Captain Slazer	316 performances
1965	The Misanthrope	Alceste	
1965	Uncle Vanya	Astrov	
1965	End Game	Clov	
1965	The Critic	Mr. Puff	
1965	Galileo	Unknown	
1966–67	Room Service	Gordon Miller	
1967	The Poker Session	Teddy	
1967–68	Prometheus Bound	Hermes	
1967–68	Volpone	Mosca	
1967–68	The Three Sisters	Solyony	
1968	We Bombed in New Haven	Sergeant Henderson	85 performances
1968	Long Day's Journey into Night	Unknown	
1969	Cop-Out	Performer	
1970	Room Service	Gordon Miller	
1970	Transfers	Performer	
1975	Love Two	Performer	
1976	Rich and Famous	Various Roles	
1976	Julius Caesar	Cassius	
1977	Richard III	Richard III	
1980–81	I Ought to Be in Pictures	Herb	324 performances
1982	Children of Darkness	Count LaRuse	
1983	Don Pasquale	Don Pasquale	
1985	Doubles	Lennie	277 performances
1986	Tartuffe	Tartuffe	
1988–90	Rumors	Lenny Ganz	535 performances
1993	Angels in America: Millennium Approaches	Roy Cohn	Drama Desk Award for Outstanding Actor in a Play; Tony Award for Best Actor in a Play
1994	Angels in America: Perestroika	Roy Cohn	Nominated – Drama Desk Award for Outstanding Featured Actor in a Play
1995	The Merchant of Venice	Shylock	Nominated – Drama Desk Award for Outstanding Actor in a Play
1998	A Dybbuk, or Between Two Worlds	Rabbi Azriel	Nominated – Drama Desk Award for Outstanding Featured Actor in a Play
1999–2000	Adam Baum	Sam Baum	
2001	A Connecticut Yankee	Launcelot	
2002	God of Vengeance	Jack Chapman	
