= Jessica Walter =

American actress (1941–2021)

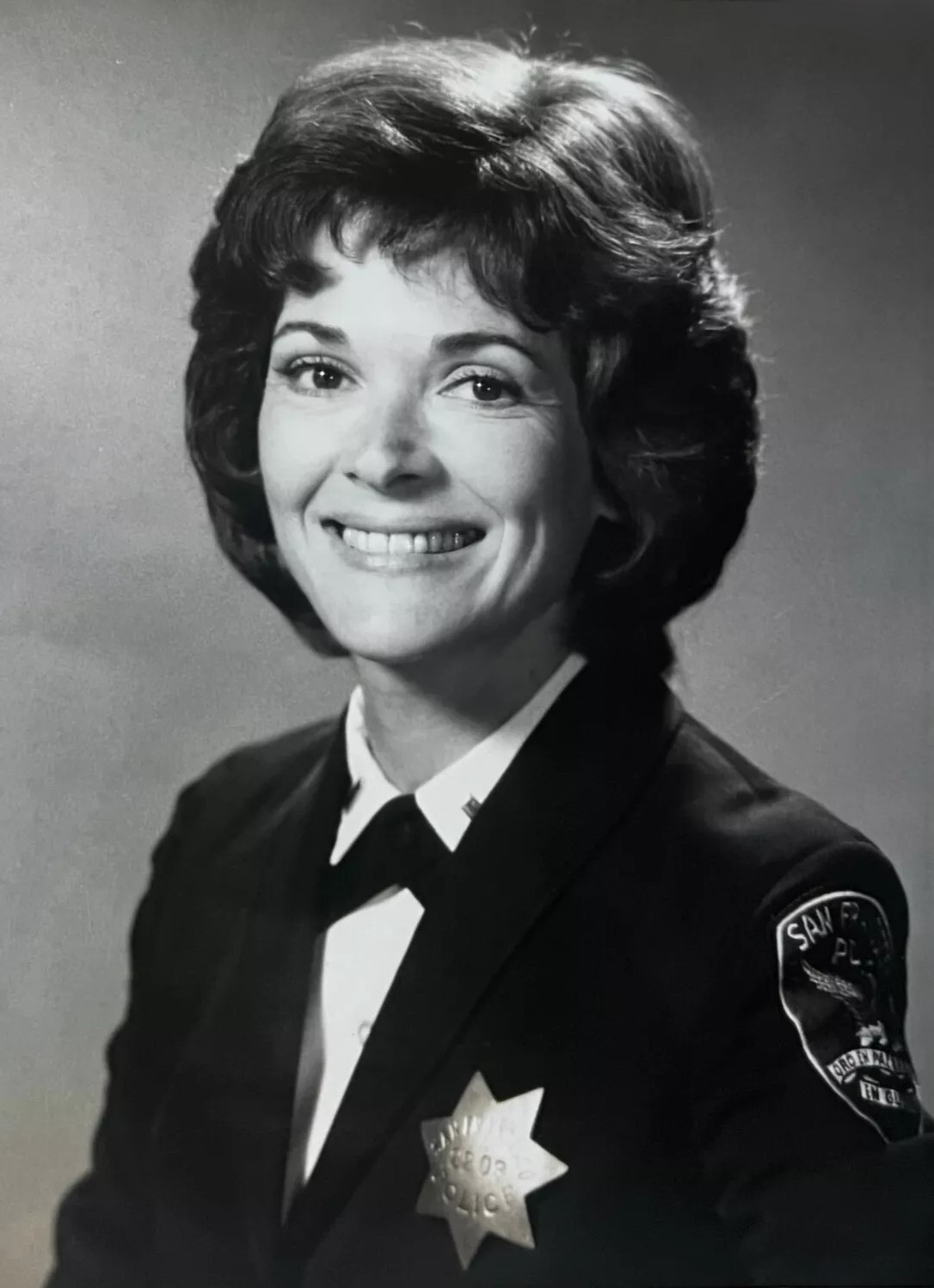
- Walter in 1974 as character Amy Prentiss
- Born: January 31, 1941; New York City, New York, U.S.
- Died: March 24, 2021 (aged 80); New York City, New York, U.S.
- Education: High School of Performing Arts; Neighborhood Playhouse School of the Theatre
- Occupation: Actress
- Years active: 1958–2021
- Spouses: Ross Bowman (m. 1966; div. 1978) Ron Leibman (m. 1983; died 2019)
- Children: 1
- Relatives: Richard Walter (brother)
- Awards: See below

Jessica Ann Walter (January 31, 1941 – March 24, 2021) was an American actress who appeared in more than 170 film, stage, and television productions.

In films, she was best known for her role as a psychotic and obsessed fan of a local disc jockey in the 1971 Clint Eastwood thriller, Play Misty for Me. On television, she was most recently known for her role of Lucille Bluth on the sitcom Arrested Development (2003–2006, 2013–2019) and for providing the voice of Malory Archer on the FX animated series Archer (2009–2021). Walter received various awards over the course of her television career, including a Primetime Emmy Award for Amy Prentiss (1975). She also received two Golden Globe Award nominations and three Screen Actors Guild Award nominations. For her starring role opposite Eastwood in Play Misty for Me, Walter received a Golden Globe nomination for Best Actress in a Motion Picture – Drama.

After studying acting at the Neighborhood Playhouse School of the Theatre in New York City, Walter began her career on the Broadway stage, winning a 1963 Clarence Derwent Award for Outstanding Debut Performance. She made her film debut in the 1964 neo-noir drama Lilith, subsequently starring in the 1966 films Grand Prix and The Group. Both performances earned her critical acclaim.

Throughout her career, Walter was a regular presence on American television, playing the title role in the short-lived police procedural Amy Prentiss, appearing in a recurring role on Trapper John, M.D., working as a series regular for the first half of season one of 90210, and providing the voice of Fran Sinclair on the series Dinosaurs. Her role as scheming socialite Lucille Bluth in Arrested Development brought her renewed attention, and she contributed voiceover work to animated series such as Archer (2009–2023), and Star vs. the Forces of Evil (2015–2018).

== Early life ==
Walter was born on January 31, 1941, in Brooklyn, New York, to Esther (née Groisser), a teacher, and David Walter, a musician who was a member of the NBC Symphony Orchestra and the New York City Ballet Orchestra. Both of Walter's parents were Jewish, with her mother having immigrated to the US from the Soviet Union in 1923. Her brother, Richard, is a retired professor who led the screenwriting program at UCLA. The siblings were raised in Elmhurst, Queens. Walter attended the High School of Performing Arts in Manhattan, graduating in 1959.

== Career ==
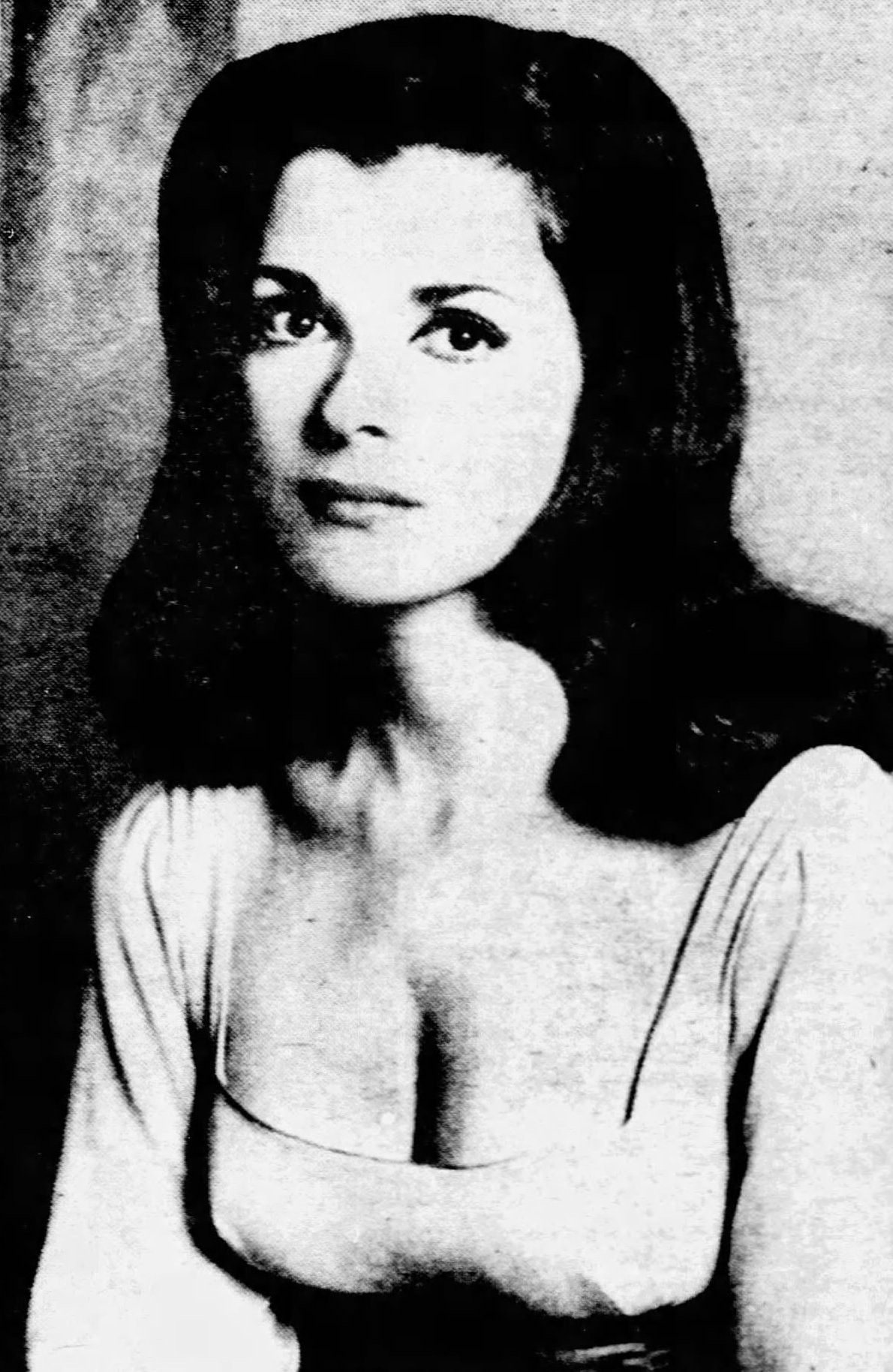
Walter in 1965

Walter began her acting career on stage, winning a Clarence Derwent Award in 1963 for Outstanding Debut Broadway Performance in Photo Finish by Peter Ustinov. She soon moved to television, and played Julie Muranoon on the television series, Love of Life. While appearing on Love of Life from 1962 to 1965, she also acted on many other popular television series, including Naked City, East Side/West Side, Ben Casey, Route 66, The Doctors and the Nurses, The Rogues, and The Defenders. Among those series is Walter's role as Lorna Richmond on "The Ordeal of Mrs. Snow" episode of The Alfred Hitchcock Hour (April 14, 1964), and a supporting role as William Shatner's wife on the legal drama For the People (1965).

In 1964, Walter appeared in the first episode of the television series Flipper as well as the episode "How Much for a Prince?" in CBS's drama The Reporter. In 1966, she appeared in "The White Knight" episode of The Fugitive.

Her earliest notable and acclaimed screen role was in the Clint Eastwood-directed film, Play Misty for Me (1971). Walter played Evelyn, a young woman who becomes violently obsessed with a disc jockey. Evelyn is known to repeatedly call a California radio station during a jazz music program hosted by Eastwood's character, Dave Garver, always requesting he play the Erroll Garner standard, "Misty". In the course of becoming infatuated with Garver, Evelyn seduces him and then attempts suicide in his home. Her obsessive behavior intensifies and she begins stalking him relentlessly and eventually breaks into his house. In a frenzy, Evelyn destroys the interior of the home and stabs his housekeeper Birdie (played by Clarice Taylor), who is hospitalized but survives. For her performance, Walter received a Golden Globe Award nomination for Best Actress in a Motion Picture – Drama category as well as critical praise. Film critic Roger Ebert described Walter as demonstrating "unnerving effectiveness" in the role.

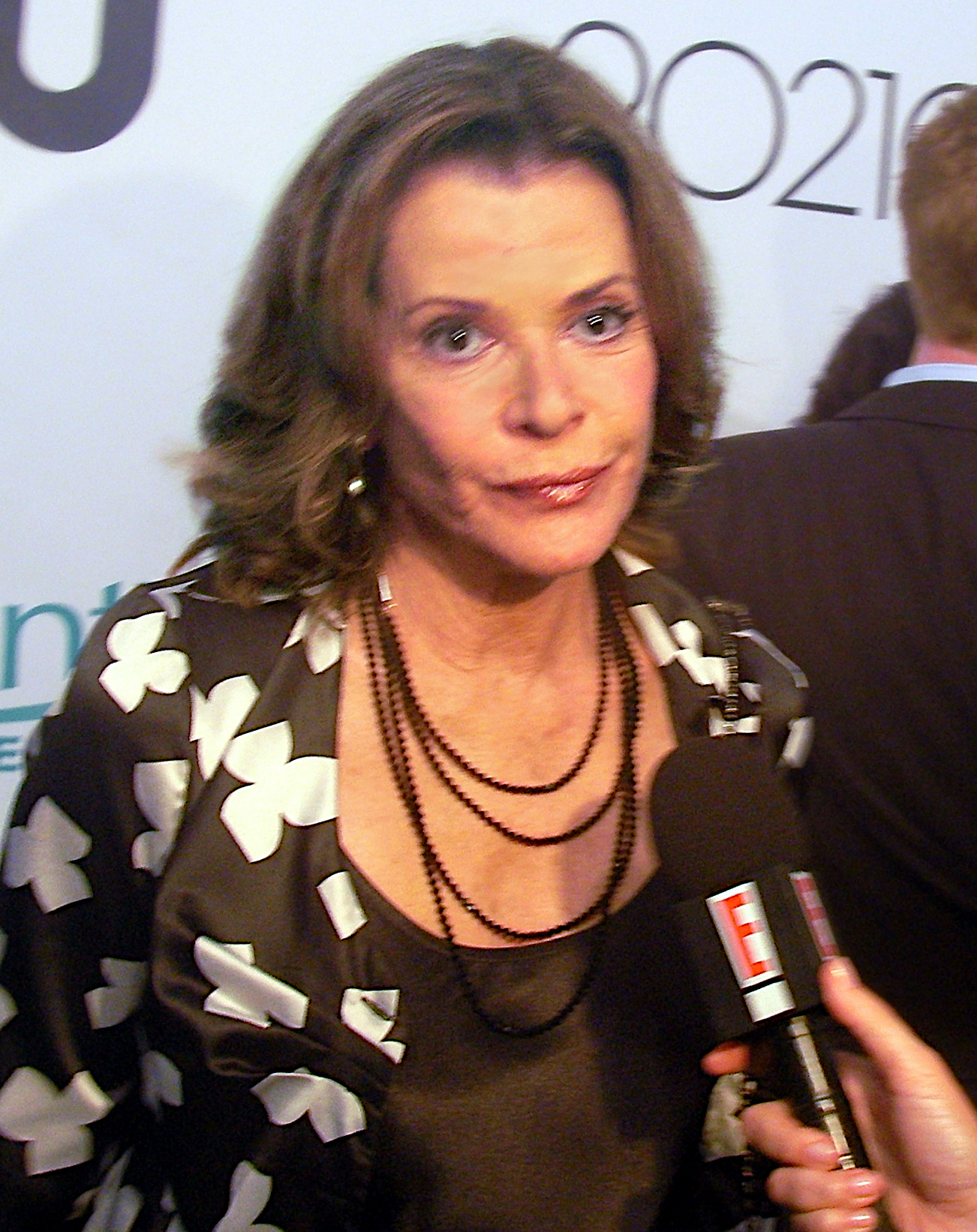
Walter in 2008

Walter's other film credits from that era include Lilith (1964), Grand Prix (1966), The Group (1966), Bye Bye Braverman (1968), and Number One (1969). She was also in three episodes of Mannix in three separate seasons.

During the 1970s, Walter co-starred in an episode of Columbo, "Mind Over Mayhem", had a recurring role on Trapper John, M.D. as Melanie McIntyre, Trapper John's former wife, and starred on the series Amy Prentiss, a spinoff of Ironside, for which she won a Primetime Emmy Award.

In 1980s, she had a role on the NBC primetime soap opera Bare Essence as Ava Marshall. Following Bare Essence, Walter worked most frequently in television and theater, though she did appear in some films including The Flamingo Kid (1984) and PCU (1994). She recorded a performance as the doll form of Chucky for the 1988 horror film Child's Play, but her lines were redubbed by Brad Dourif after negative test screenings which Tom Holland and Don Mancini attributed partially to Walter's performance; they claimed Walter was effectively frightening in the role but failed to convey the sense of black humor they envisioned the character to have and that her voice seemed out of place because the character was male.

In the 1990s, Walter voiced Fran Sinclair on the ABC comedy Dinosaurs, and appeared on Just Shoot Me! as Eve Gallo, the mother of Maya and the ex-wife of magazine publisher Jack Gallo.

From 2003 to 2006, she appeared in a regular role as the scheming alcoholic socialite matriarch Lucille Bluth on Fox's comedy series Arrested Development. In 2005, she received a nomination for the Primetime Emmy Award for Outstanding Supporting Actress in a Comedy Series for the role. Despite her convincing portrayal of Lucille, she stated: "I'm nothing like Lucille. Nothing. My daughter will tell you. I'm really a very nice, boring person." Despite acclaim from critics, Arrested Development received low ratings and viewership on Fox, which cancelled the series in 2006. It was revived by Netflix for season four in 2013, where it gained huge popularity. Walter reprised her role for season five, premiering in 2018.

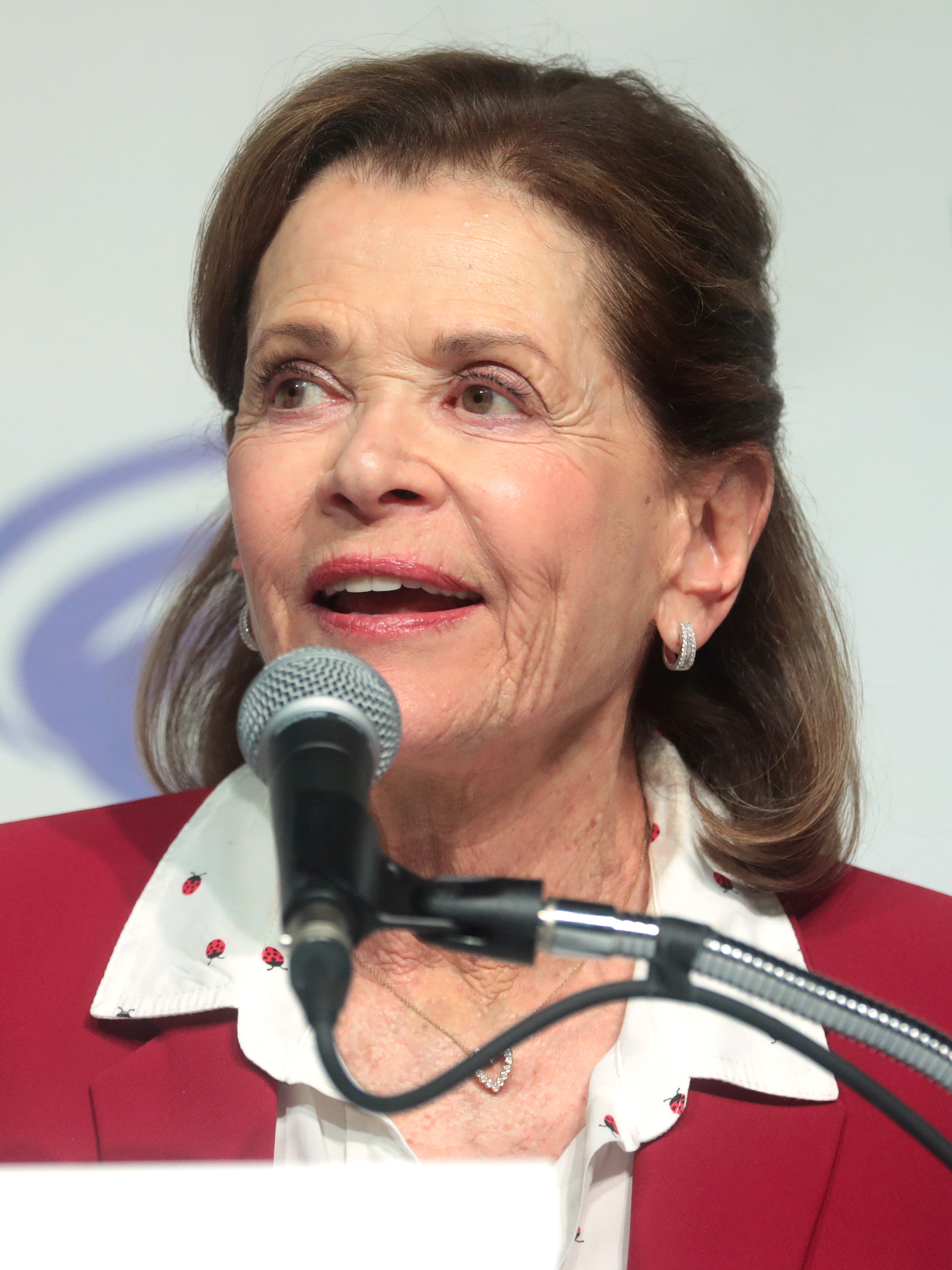
Walter in 2019

Walter played Tabitha Wilson on the first season of 90210 (2008–2009), until the character was written off halfway through the season. In 2007, she guest-starred on the sitcom Rules of Engagement in the episode titled "Kids" and in 2009 guest-starred in an episode of Law & Order: Special Victims Unit as legal-aid lawyer Petra Gilmartin. Previously in 2008, she had appeared in Law & Order: Criminal Intent as Eleanor Reynolds in the episode "Please Note We Are No Longer Accepting Letters of Recommendation from Henry Kissinger". From 2011 to 2012, she starred in the TV Land sitcom Retired at 35 alongside her Bye Bye Braverman co-star George Segal.

Walter starred as Evangeline Harcourt in the Broadway revival of Anything Goes, which began previews in March 2011 and officially opened on April 7, 2011.

Walter voiced spymaster Malory Archer on the FX animated series Archer. Walter mentioned that her performance in Arrested Development was explicitly referenced when auditions for the part of Malory were sought.

In May 2018, Walter became part of an on-set controversy regarding harassment she said she had received from Arrested Development co-star Jeffrey Tambor. During a cast interview with the New York Times, Walter was asked about an incident which Tambor had alluded to several months before. Walter teared up and stated that "[i]n like almost 60 years of working, I've never had anybody yell at me like that on a set. And it's hard to deal with, but I'm over it now", while also noting that Tambor had apologized and had not done anything sexually inappropriate, and that she would work with him again. During the same interview, co-stars Jason Bateman, Tony Hale, and David Cross were criticized in multiple media outlets for appearing to excuse Tambor's behavior without acknowledging Walter's experience. Within days, all three men had issued apologies to Walter.

== Personal life ==
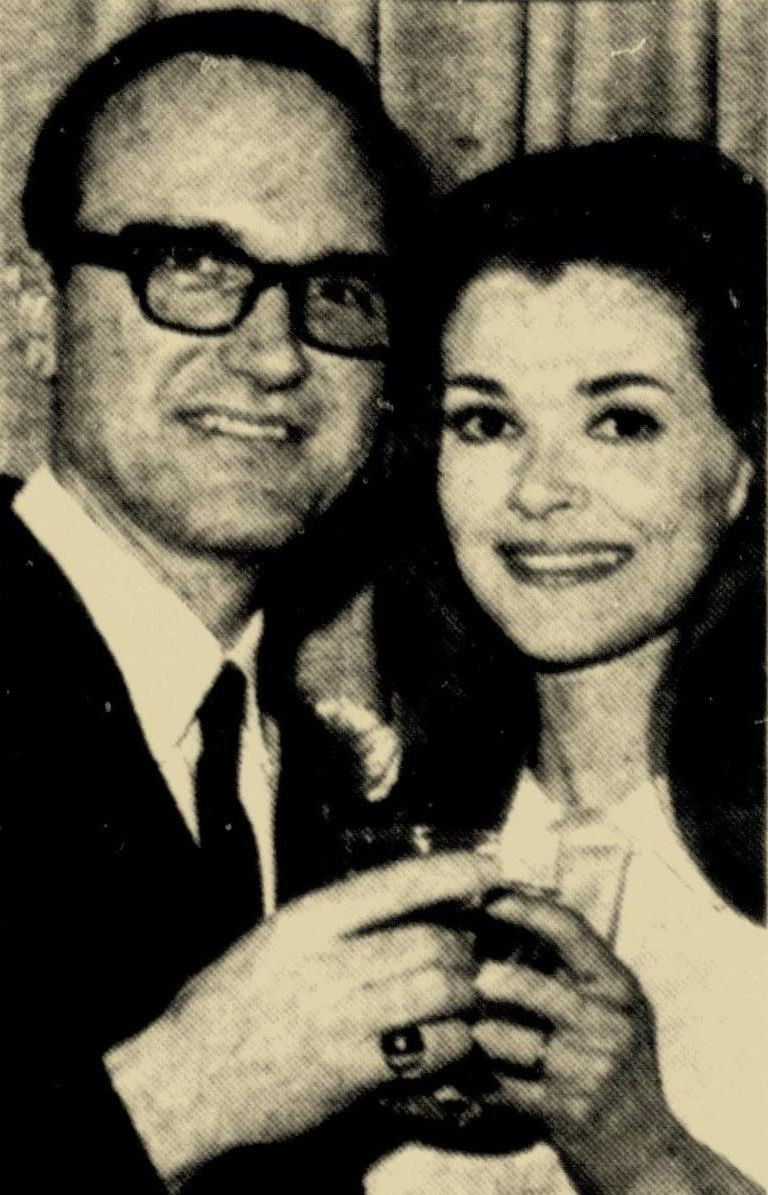
Walter and her first husband on their wedding day

On March 27, 1966, Walter married Ross Bowman, a Broadway stage manager and television director from Portland, Oregon. The couple had a daughter, Brooke (born May 18, 1972), once an executive for 21st Century Fox and later a Senior Vice President of development at ABC Family. Walter filed for divorce from Bowman in November 1976, and the divorce became final in 1978. Their grandson Micah was born on July 7, 2013, to Brooke and her husband, David Heymann.

During her first marriage, a fire broke out in the couple's tenth-floor apartment on September 28, 1966, while Bowman was out of town. Walter was rescued by a firefighter.

On June 26, 1983, Walter married actor Ron Leibman. They remained married until his death on December 6, 2019. Walter and Leibman appeared together in Neil Simon's play Rumors, and portrayed a husband and wife in the film Dummy (2003), and on Law & Order (in the episode "House Counsel"). Leibman joined the cast of Archer, voicing her character's new husband.

While Walter's mother raised her in the Jewish tradition, Walter later described herself as not religious but "very Jewish in my heart".

=== Death ===
On March 24, 2021, Walter died in her sleep at her Manhattan home. She was 80 years old. The Season 12 finale of Archer ("Mission: Difficult") was dedicated to her memory.

== Filmography ==
=== Film ===
Year	Title	Roles	Rf.
1964	Lilith	Laura	
1966	Grand Prix	Pat Stoddard	
1966	The Group	Libby	
1968	Bye Bye Braverman	Inez Braverman	
1969	Number One	Julie Catlan	
1971	Play Misty for Me	Evelyn Draper	
1979	Goldengirl	Melody	
1981	Going Ape!	Fiona Sabatini	
1982	Spring Fever	Celia Berryman	
1984	The Flamingo Kid	Phyllis Brody	
1988	Tapeheads	Kay Mart	
1993	Ghost in the Machine	Elaine Spencer	
1994	PCU	President Garcia-Thompson	
1995	Temptress	Dr. Phyllis Evergreen	
1998	Slums of Beverly Hills	Doris Zimmerman	
2003	Dummy	Fern	
2006	Unaccompanied Minors	Cindi	
2012	Bending the Rules	Lena Gold	
2017	Undercover Grandpa	Maddy Harcourt	
2017	Keep the Change	Carrie	
2020	The Mimic	Estelle	

=== Television ===
Year	Title	Role	Notes
1960	Diagnosis: Unknown		Episode: "The Curse of the Gypsy"
1962–65	Love of Life	Julie Murano	
1962–63	Naked City	Girl / Louise	2 episodes
1963	Route 66	Liz Marshall	Episode: "A Long Way from St. Louie"
1964	East Side/West Side	Phyllis Dowling	Episode: "Take Sides with the Sun"
1964	The Alfred Hitchcock Hour	Lorna Richmond	Episode: "The Ordeal of Mrs. Snow"
1964	Ben Casey	Flora Farr	Episode: "August Is the Month Before Christmas"
1964	Flipper	Elena	Episode: "300 Feet Below"
1964	The Doctors and the Nurses	Edith Robertson	2 episodes
1964	The Reporter	Jennifer	Episode: "How Much for a Prince?"
1964	The Rogues	Linda Tennant	Episode: "House of Cards"
1964–65	The Defenders	Sharon Ruskin / Myra Maxwell	2 episodes
1965	For the People	Phyllis Koster	13 episodes
1965	The Trials of O'Brien	Carole Ann Muffit	Episode: "Picture Me a Murder"
1966	The Fugitive	Pat Haynes	Episode: "The White Knight"
1966	Preview Tonight	Vivian Scott	Episode: "Pursue and Destroy"
1966–73	The F.B.I.	Various	6 episodes
1968	Kiss Me, Kate	Lois Lane / Bianca	Television film
1968–71	The Name of the Game	Linda Ramsey / Rita Mason / Allie Chambers	2 episodes
1969	It Takes a Thief	Lori Brooks	Episode: "The Baranoff Timetable"
1969	The Immortal	Janet Braddock	TV Pilot/ABC Movie of the Week
1969	Then Came Bronson	Morgana Mendoza	Episode: "Where Will the Trumpets Be?"
1969	Three's a Crowd	Jessica Carson	ABC Movie of the Week
1969–73	Love, American Style	Various	5 episodes
1970	Mission: Impossible	Valerie	Episode: "Orpheus"
1970	The Most Deadly Game	Leslie	Episode: "Breakdown"
1970–73	Mannix	Various	3 episodes
1971	Men at Law	Kate Callendar	Episode: "Let the Dier Beware"
1971	Alias Smith and Jones	Louise Carson	Episode: "Everything Else You Can Steal"
1971	They Call It Murder	Jane Antrim	Television film
1971–73	Marcus Welby, M.D.	Marian Lawrence / Jenny Alquist	2 episodes
1971–74	Medical Center	Various	4 episodes
1972	The Sixth Sense	Jordana Theland	Episode: "The Heart That Wouldn't Stay Buried"
1972	Women in Chains	Dee Dee	ABC Movie of the Week
1972	Banyon	Emily	Episode: "The Old College Try"
1972	Cannon	Jane Butler	Episode: "That Was No Lady"
1972	Home for the Holidays	Frederica "Freddie" Morgan	ABC Movie of the Week
1973	Banacek	Erica Osburn	Episode: "The Two Million Clams of Cap'n Jack"
1973	Jigsaw		Episode: "Kiss the Dream Goodbye"
1973	Tenafly	Joyce Harrison	Episode: "The Cash and Carry Caper"
1973–76	The Streets of San Francisco	Glen Williams / Glen Conway / Maggie Jarris	2 episodes
1974	Barnaby Jones	Brooke Leighton / Bernice Kellner	2 episodes
1974	Columbo	Dr. Margaret Nicholson	Episode: "Mind Over Mayhem"
1974	The Magician	Marian Tripp	Episode: "The Illusion Of The Evil Spikes"
1974	Ironside	Amy Prentiss	Episode: "Amy Prentiss AKA The Chief"; Pilot for Amy Prentiss
1974	Hurricane	Louise Damon	ABC Movie of the Week
1974	Hawaii Five-O	Carla Crystal	Episode: "The Two Faced Corpse"
1974–75	Amy Prentiss	Amy Prentiss	3 episodes
1975	McCloud	Mrs. Jessica Wright	Episode: "Park Avenue Pirates"
1976	Having Babies	Sally McNamara	Television film
1976	McMillan	Donna Drake	Episode: "All Bets Off"
1976	Victory at Entebbe	Nomi Haroun	Television film
1977	Visions	Anna II	Episode: "The Prison Game"
1977	All That Glitters	Joan Hamlyn	
1977	The New Adventures of Wonder Woman	Gloria	Episode: "The Return of Wonder Woman"
1977	Black Market Baby	Louise Carmino	Television film
1977	What Really Happened to the Class of '65?	Fran	Episode: "The Girl Nobody Knew"
1977	Gibbsville		Episode: "The Grand Gesture"
1978	Wild and Wooly	Megan	Television film
1978	Wheels	Ursula	TV miniseries, Episode #1.1
1978	Dr. Strange	Morgan le Fay	Television film
1978	Secrets of Three Hungry Wives	Christina Wood	Television film
1978	Quincy, M.E.	Jessica Ross	Episode: "Images"
1978–85	The Love Boat	Various	8 episodes
1979	Vampire	Nicole DeCamp	Television film
1979	She's Dressed to Kill	Irene Barton	Television film
1979–85	Trapper John, M.D.	Melanie Townsend McIntyre	10 episodes
1981	Miracle on Ice	Pat Brooks	Television film
1981	Aloha Paradise		Episode: "The Best of Friends/Success/9 Carats"
1981	Scruples	Maggie	Television film
1982	Knots Landing	Victoria Hill	Episode: "Reunion"
1982	Joanie Loves Chachi	Vanessa Sterling	Episode: "Everybody Loves Aunt Vanessa"
1982	Matt Houston	Glynnis Durand	Episode: "Joey's Here"
1982	Bare Essence	Ava Marshall	TV miniseries, 11 episodes
1983	Thursday's Child	Roz Richardson	Television film
1984	The Return of Marcus Welby, M.D.	Astrid Carlisle	Television film
1984–85	Three's a Crowd	Claudia Bradford	8 episodes
1985	The Execution	Gertrude Simon	Television film
1985–94	Murder, She Wrote	Various	4 episodes
1986	Hotel	Irene Fitzgerald	Episode: "Child's Play"
1986	Magnum, P.I.	Joan Fulton	Episode: "Novel Connection"
1986	Wildfire	Lady Diabolyn (voice)	Main role
1987	ABC Afterschool Specials	Dr. Stein	Episode: "Just a Regular Kid: An AIDS Story"
1988	J.J. Starbuck	Brin Coltan	Episode: "Murder by Design"
1988	Aaron's Way	Connie Lo Verde	14 episodes
1991	The Pirates of Dark Water	Additional voices	2 episodes
1991–94	Dinosaurs	Fran Sinclair (voice)	65 episodes
1992	Jack's Place	Claire	Episode: "Romance Takes a Curtain Call"
1992	The Round Table	Anne McPherson	Episode: "Yesterday We Were Playing Football"
1994	Babylon 5	Senator Elise Voudreau	Episode: "A Spider in the Web"
1994	Coach	Susan Miller	5 episodes
1995	Law & Order	Anna Kopell	Episode: "House Counsel"
1996	Wing Commander Academy	Admiral Rhea Bergstrom (voice)	Episode: "Chain of Command"
1996	The Magic School Bus	Ashley Walker-Club-Dupree (voice)	Episode: "Rocks and Rolls"
1996–97	One Life to Live	Eleanor Armitage	6 episodes
1997	Doomsday Rock	Secretary	Television film
1997	You Wish	Estelle	Episode: "The Big Ride"
1998	Poltergeist: The Legacy	Suzanne Barnard	Episode: "The Light"
1998	Just Shoot Me!	Eve Gallo	Episode: "Eve of Destruction"
1998–2000	Oh Baby	Celia Calloway	20 episodes
2000–01	Jack & Jill	Mrs. Louise Zane	3 episodes
2003	Touched by an Angel	Naomi	Episode: "The Show Must Not Go On"
2003–06, 2013, 2018–19	Arrested Development	Lucille Bluth	82 episodes
2004	I Do (But I Don't)	Gennifer Douglas	Television film
2006	The X's	Louise (voice)	Episode: "In-Law Enforcement"
2006–07	The Life and Times of Juniper Lee	Demoness (voice)	2 episodes
2007	The Land Before Time	Old One (voice)	Episode: "The Brave Longneck Scheme"
2007	Rules of Engagement	Constance	Episode: "Kids"
2007	The Wedding Bells	Candace Sinclair	Episode: "Partly Cloudy, with a Chance of Disaster"
2007–10	Saving Grace	Betty Hanadarko	5 episodes
2008	Law & Order: Criminal Intent	Eleanor Reynolds	Episode: "Please Note We Are No Longer Accepting; Letters of Recommendation from Henry Kissinger"
2008	Happy Hour	Nanette	Episode: "Thanksgiving"
2008–09	90210	Tabitha Wilson	13 episodes
2009	Law & Order: Special Victims Unit	Attorney Petra Gilmartin	Episode: "Solitary"
2009–21	Archer	Malory Archer, "Mother" (voice)	110 episodes; 12th season released posthumously
2010	Gravity	Henrietta	5 episodes
2010	Make It or Break It	Grandma Tanner	Episode: "Battle of the Flexes"
2010	Scooby-Doo! Mystery Incorporated	Mrs. Wyatt (voice)	Episode: "Howl of the Fright Hound"
2011	The Big Bang Theory	Mrs. Latham	Episode: "The Benefactor Factor"
2011–12	Retired at 35	Elaine Robbins	Main cast, 20 episodes
2014	Jennifer Falls	Maggie	Main cast, 10 episodes
2015–18	Star vs. the Forces of Evil	Miss Heinous / Meteora Butterfly (voice)	9 episodes
2015, 2017	NCIS	Judith McKnight	2 episodes
2016	Turbo Fast	Tabitha (voice)	Episode: "Worst in Show"
2016	The Odd Couple	Meredith	Episode: "Felix Navidad"
2017	Justice League Action	Athena (voice)	Episode: "The Trouble with Truth"
2017	Difficult People	Mrs. Chuck	Episode: "Criminal Minds"
2018	Clarence	Ma (voice)	Episode: "Brain TV"
2019	At Home with Amy Sedaris	Alice Brittlecrunch	2 episodes
2019–20	Good Girls	Judith	2 episodes
2020	Harley Quinn	Granny Goodness, Wendy Brown (voice)	Episode: "Inner (Para) Demons"
2021	American Housewife	Margaret	Episode: "Getting Frank with the Ottos"; final television role

== Theater credits ==
Year	Title	Roles	Venue
1958	Middle Of The Night	Kid Sister	Bucks County Playhouse
1960	Come Blow Your Horn	Nurse	Bucks County Playhouse
1960	Advise and Consent	Liz	Cort Theatre
1962	Night Life	Cigarette Girl	Brooks Atkinson Theatre
1963	Photo Finish	Clarice, Ada Cooney	Brooks Atkinson Theatre
1964	A Severed Head	Georgie Hands	Royale Theatre
1967	Barefoot in the Park	Corie Bratter	Kenley Players
1967	Gypsy	Gypsy Rose Lee	The Muny
1969	How Now, Dow Jones	Cynthia Pike	Kenley Players
1970	Oliver!	Nancy	Sacramento Light Opera
1970	The Women	Sylvia Fowler	Repertory Theatre of New Orleans
1977	The Royal Family	Cavendish	Parker Playhouse
1985	Fighting International Fat	Rosalind Gambol	Playwrights Horizons
1986	Tartuffe	Elmire	Los Angeles Theatre Center
1988	Rumors	Claire Ganz	Broadhurst Theatre
1990	Rumors	Claire Ganz	Doolittle Theatre, Los Angeles
2001	The Vagina Monologues	Performer	Westside Theatre
2001	A Connecticut Yankee	Guinevere	Encores!
2002	Going Native	Mother	Long Wharf Theatre
2003	The Stillborn Lover	Juliet Riordan	Berkshire Theater Festival
2005	Side By Side by Sondheim	Narrator	Berkshire Theater Festival
2011	Anything Goes	Evangeline Harcourt	Stephen Sondheim Theatre
2016	Steel Magnolias	Ouiser Boudreaux	Bucks County Playhouse
2018	Show Boat in Concert	Parthy Ann Hawks	Bucks County Playhouse

== Awards and nominations ==
Award	Year	Category	Nominated work	Result	Ref.
Annie Awards	2011	Voice Acting in a Television Production	Archer	Nominated	
Annie Awards	2012	Voice Acting in an Animated Television or Other Broadcast Venue Production	Archer (Episode: "Lo Scandalo")	Nominated	
Clarence Derwent Awards	1963	Best Supporting Actress	Photo Finish	Won	
Critics' Choice Super Awards	2020	Best Voice Actress in an Animated Series	Archer	Nominated	
Golden Globe Awards	1966	Most Promising Newcomer – Female	Grand Prix	Nominated	
Golden Globe Awards	1971	Best Actress in a Motion Picture – Drama	Play Misty for Me	Nominated	
Online Film & Television Association Awards	2003	Best Supporting Actress in a Comedy Series	Arrested Development	Won	
Online Film & Television Association Awards	2004	Best Supporting Actress in a Comedy Series	Arrested Development	Won	
Online Film & Television Association Awards	2005	Best Supporting Actress in a Comedy Series	Arrested Development	Won	
Online Film & Television Association Awards	2006	Best Supporting Actress in a Comedy Series	Arrested Development	Nominated	
Online Film & Television Association Awards	2013	Best Supporting Actress in a Comedy Series	Arrested Development	Nominated	
Online Film & Television Association Awards	2021	Best Voice-Over Performance	Archer	Won	
Online Film & Television Association Awards	2022	Best Voice-Over Performance	Archer	Nominated	
Photoplay Awards	1967	Most Promising New Star (Female)	—N/a	Nominated	
Primetime Emmy Awards	1975	Outstanding Lead Actress in a Limited Series	Amy Prentiss	Won	
Primetime Emmy Awards	1977	Outstanding Lead Actress for a Single Appearance in a Drama or Comedy Series	The Streets of San Francisco (Episode: "Til Death Do Us Part")	Nominated	
Primetime Emmy Awards	1980	Outstanding Supporting Actress in a Drama Series	Trapper John, M.D.	Nominated	
Primetime Emmy Awards	2005	Outstanding Supporting Actress in a Comedy Series	Arrested Development	Nominated	
Primetime Emmy Awards	2021	Outstanding Character Voice-Over Performance	Archer (Episode: "The Double Date")	Nominated (Note: Posthumous nomination)	
Primetime Emmy Awards	2022	Outstanding Character Voice-Over Performance	Archer (Episode: "London Time")	Nominated	
Satellite Awards	2003	Best Actress in a Supporting Role in a Series – Musical or Comedy	Arrested Development	Won	
Satellite Awards	2013	Best Actress in a Television Series – Musical or Comedy	Arrested Development	Nominated	
Screen Actors Guild Awards	2004	Outstanding Performance by an Ensemble in a Comedy Series	Arrested Development	Nominated	
Screen Actors Guild Awards	2005	Outstanding Performance by an Ensemble in a Comedy Series	Arrested Development	Nominated	
Screen Actors Guild Awards	2013	Outstanding Performance by an Ensemble in a Comedy Series	Arrested Development	Nominated	
TV Land Awards	2004	Future Classic Award	Arrested Development	Won	
