= Keep the Change (2017 film) =

- Directed by: Rachel Israel
- Written by: Rachel Israel
- Produced by: Summer Shelton; Todd Remis; Kurt Enger
- Starring: Brandon Polansky; Samantha Elisofon; Nicky Gottlieb; Will Deaver; Tibor Feldman; Jonathan Tchaikovsky; Jessica Walter
- Cinematography: Zachary Halberd
- Edited by: Alex Camilleri
- Music by: Amie Doherty
- Production company: Tangerine Entertainment
- Distributed by: Kino Lorber
- Release date: April 20, 2017 (Tribeca)
- Running time: 94 minutes
- Country: United States
- Language: English

Keep the Change is a 2017 American romantic comedy film written and directed by Rachel Israel and starring Brandon Polansky, Samantha Elisofon, Nicky Gottlieb, Will Deaver, Tibor Feldman, Jonathan Tchaikovsky and Jessica Walter. It is Israel’s feature directorial debut and based on her 2013 short film of the same name.

== Cast ==
- Brandon Polansky as David
- Samantha Elisofon as Sarah
- Nicky Gottlieb as Sammy
- Will Deaver
- Jessica Walter as Carrie
- Tibor Feldman as Lenny
- Jonathan Tchaikovsky as Matt Cone
- Dorsey Massey
- Heidi Landis
- Anna Suzuki as Angie

== Release ==
The film premiered at the Tribeca Film Festival on April 20, 2017. Then it was released on March 16, 2018.

== Reception ==
The film has a 100% rating on Rotten Tomatoes based on 29 reviews. Filipe Freitas of Film Threat rated the film an 8 out of 10. Derek Smith of Slant Magazine awarded the film three stars out of four. Michael Nordine of IndieWire graded the film a B.

The Hollywood Reporter gave the film a positive review: “A modest but refreshing love story that takes its autistic protagonists on their own terms.”

Nick Schager of Variety also gave the film a positive review and wrote, “…an ode to self-discovery and acceptance that’s as funny as it is sweet.”

== Awards ==
The film won the Founders Award for Best Narrative Feature at the Tribeca Film Festival, where Israel also won the award for Best New Narrative Director and the Nora Ephron Prize for Special Jury Mention.
