= Michael Panes =

American actor and screenwriter

- Occupation: Actor
- Years active: 1994–present
- Partner: Lisa Loeb (former)

Michael Panes is an American actor, writer, musician and composer.

== Career ==
Panes appeared in Lisa Loeb's reality television series Number 1 Single. The two were old friends and during the course of the show began to date. Panes and Loeb ended their relationship when Panes had to move to Los Angeles for an acting role. Loeb has since married.

Panes's film roles include classical musician Levi Panes in The Anniversary Party and Gore Vidal in Infamous.

== Filmography ==
Key
†	Denotes works that have not yet been released

=== Film ===
Year	Title	Role	Notes
1997	Dinner and Driving	Patron at Dresden Room	
2001	The Anniversary Party	Levi Panes	
2002	Fabled	Dr. Roy Frumkes	
2003	Carolina	John	
2004	Surviving Eden	Dennis Flotchky	
2004	Marmalade	Eddie	
2004	Eulogy	Adult Film Director	
2005	Adam & Steve	Lou	
2005	Going Shopping	Waiting Man	
2005	The Californians	Marion Pardon	
2006	Infamous	Gore Vidal	
2007	Broken English	Glen	
2007	Watching the Detectives	Lucien	
2008	Have Tig at Your Party	Audience Member	
2009	(Untitled)	Grant	
2009	Confessions of a Shopaholic	Russell	
2009	Falling Up	Laszlo	
2010	Please Give	Shopper	
2010	Janie Jones	Ulysses	
2011	Bat $#*! Crazy	Dr. Frumkes	
2011	The Love Guide	Ira	
2011	We Bought a Zoo	Principal	
2013	Free the Nipple	Lawyer	
2014	Someone Marry Barry	Rabbi Frankel	Uncredited
2015	The Perfect Guy	Cooper	
2016	Jimmy Vestvood: Amerikan Hero	Docent	
2016	The Architect	Adjuster	
2018	Hot Air	Concierge	
2019	Jacob's Ladder	Bandleader	
2020	The Man in the Woods	David Glasser	

=== Television ===
Year	Title	Role	Notes
1996	Sherman Oaks	Haji	2 episodes
1997	Austin Stories	Jarrod	Episode: "Austin Sex Stories"
1998	Mike Hammer, Private Eye	Earnie Nathan / Ernie Nathan	2 episodes
2000	Mission Hill	Jerry the Republican Vampire	Episode: "Andy and Kevin Make a Friend"
2002	Frasier	Clark	Episode: "Three Blind Dates"
2002	Gilmore Girls	Bobby	Episode: "There's the Rub"
2003	Lucky	Dr. Alan Kirschbaum	Episode: "Something for Everyone"
2006	Heist	Tom Swayman	Episode: "How Billy Got His Groove Back"
2008	Wainy Days	Craig / Waiter	2 episodes
2008–2009	Easy to Assemble	Spazzy Sheraton / Mickey	8 episodes
2010–2011	Backwash	Jonesy	13 episodes
2011	Law & Order: Criminal Intent	Roger Porter	Episode: "Icarus"
2013	Grow	Starstruck Patient	Television film
2016	Bull	Juror Dionysus	Episode: "Bedside Manner"

Writing Credits

Year	Title	Creator	Writer	Executive Producer	Notes
1994	Love Street	No	Yes	No	
1995–1997	Sherman Oaks	No	Yes	No	
1997	Austin Stories	No	Yes	No	
1999–2002	Mission Hill	No	Yes	Co-producer	
2021–present	Godfather of Harlem	No	Yes	Yes	
2024	Hotel Cocaine	No	Yes	Yes	
2026–present	The Westies	Yes	Yes	Yes	
