= Opatoshu =

Opatoshu is a surname. Notable people with the surname include:

- Danny Opatoshu (born 1947), American screenwriter
- David Opatoshu (1918–1996), American film, stage, and television actor, son of Joseph
- Joseph Opatoshu (1886–1954), Polish-born Yiddish novelist and short story writer
