= Evelyn F. Burkey Award =

Award presented by the Writers Guild of America, East

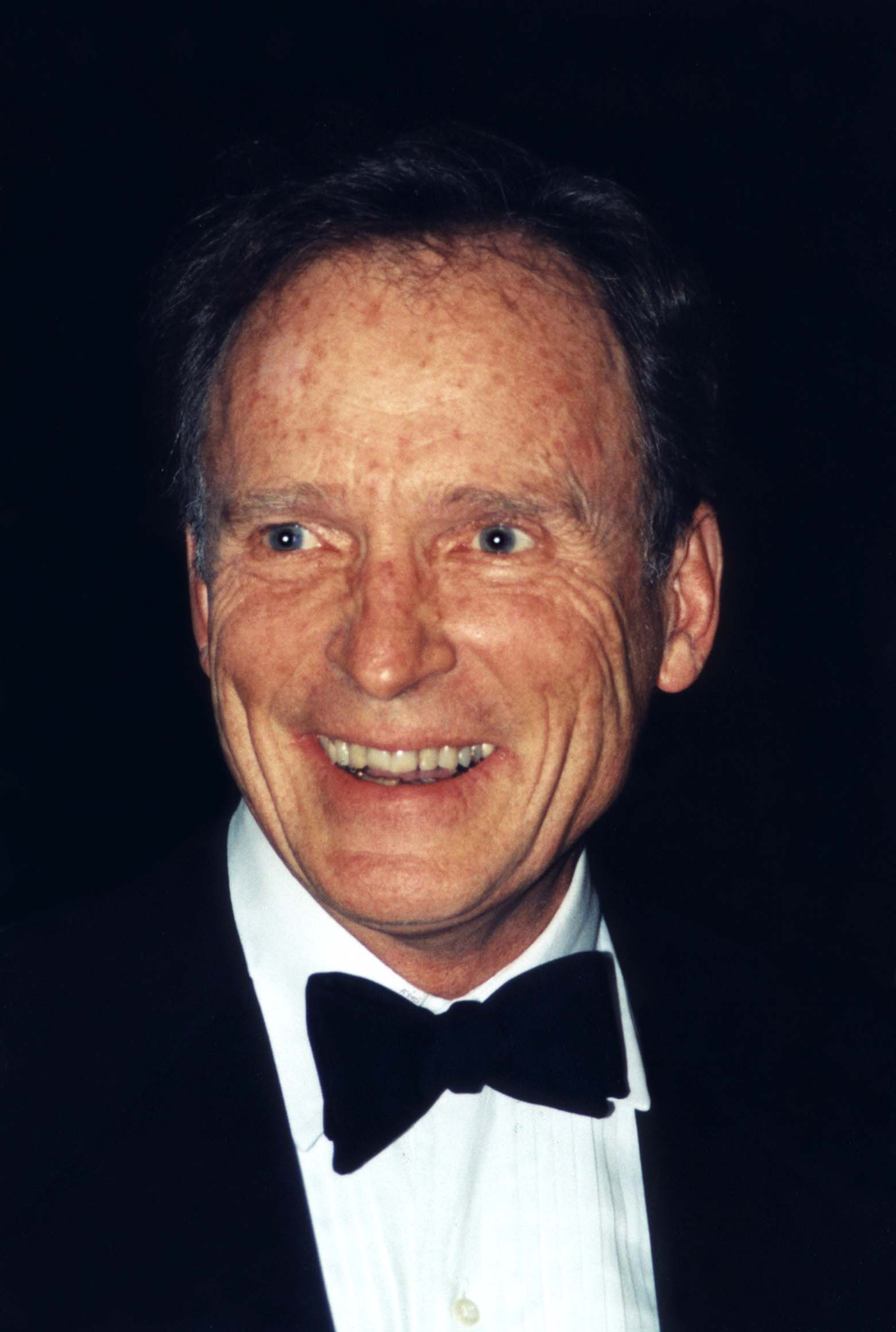
- The 2022 recipient: Dick Cavett
- Awarded for: "contributions [that] have brought honor and dignity to writers everywhere"
- Country: United States
- Presented by: Writers Guild of America, East
- First award: 1978
- Currently held by: Dick Cavett

The Evelyn F. Burkey Award (previously called the Evelyn F. Burkey Memorial Award) is an honorary award presented by the Writers Guild of America, East (WGAE). While most WGA Awards are conferred by the WGA West, the Burkey Award is one of three WGA Awards for which the WGAE chooses winners. The award is named for Evelyn F. Burkey, who helped found the WGAE in 1953 and served as its first executive director until she retired in 1972. Since the 30th Writers Guild of America Awards in 1978, WGAE has presented the Burkey Award annually, except for the following years when no award was presented: 2012–13, 2017–18, 2020–21, and 2023.

The award recognizes a person or organization "whose contributions have brought honor and dignity to writers everywhere." According to WGAE President Michael Winship, the WGAE "has presented the Burkey Award to celebrate the achievements of leaders—in the arts or politics—who have advanced the causes of creativity and freedom of speech." Unlike other WGA Awards, which focus on professional film and television writing, the Burkey Award can be won by people who are not WGA members. It has been won by political figures; for example, in 2004 the WGAE presented the award to John McCain, citing his opposition to FCC rule changes on the issue of media cross-ownership in the United States.

== Winners ==
=== 1970s ===
Year	Recipient(s)	Ref.
1978 (30th)	Fred Coe	
1979 (31st)	Barbara Schultz	

=== 1980s ===
Year	Recipient(s)	Ref.
1980 (32nd)	Walter Cronkite	
1981 (33rd)	Elmer Lower	
1982 (34th)	Herman Brodkin	
1983 (35th)	Alan Wagner	
1984 (36th)	Leonard Wasser	
1985 (37th)	Jerome B. Lurie	
1986 (38th)	Athol Fugard and Lloyd Richards	
1987 (39th)	Edwin Newman	
1988 (40th)	Andy Rooney, Local 1101 and District 1 of the Communications Workers of America	
1989 (41st)	Horton Foote	

=== 1990s ===
Year	Recipient(s)	Ref.
1990 (42nd)	Art Buchwald	
1991 (43rd)	George Schaefer	
1992 (44th)	Jacqueline Babbin	
1993 (45th)	Arthur Miller	
1994 (46th)	Joan Ganz Cooney	
1995 (47th)	Dennis Potter	
1996 (48th)	Ken Saro-Wiwa	
1997 (49th)	Sidney Lumet	
1998 (50th)	Judy Crichton	
1999 (51st)	David Brown	

=== 2000s ===
Year	Recipient(s)	Ref.
2000 (52nd)	Václav Havel	
2001 (53rd)	Tom Fontana	
2002 (54th)	Colin Callender	
2003 (55th)	Martin Scorsese	
2004 (56th)	John McCain	
2005 (57th)	Claire Labine	
2006 (58th)	Museum of Television and Radio	
2007 (59th)	Joan Didion	
2008 (60th)	Walter Bernstein	
2009 (61st)	Committee to Protect Journalists	

=== 2010s ===
Year	Recipient(s)	Ref.
2010 (62nd)	Edward Albee	
2011 (63rd)	Archive of American Television	
2012 (64th)	Not awarded	
2013 (65th)	Not awarded	
2014 (66th)	James Schamus	
2015 (67th)	Norman Lear	
2016 (68th)	Al Franken	
2017 (69th)	Not awarded	
2018 (70th)	Not awarded	
2019 (71st)	Franklin Leonard	

=== 2020s ===
Year	Recipient(s)	Ref.
2020 (72nd)	Not awarded	
2021 (73rd)	Not awarded	
2022 (74th)	Dick Cavett	
2023 (75th)	Not awarded	
