= The Great Impostor =

1961 film by Robert Mulligan

- Theatrical release poster
- Directed by: Robert Mulligan
- Screenplay by: Liam O'Brien
- Based on: The Great Impostor; 1959 book by Robert Crichton
- Produced by: Robert Arthur
- Starring: Tony Curtis; Frank Gorshin; Gary Merrill; Edmond O'Brien; Arthur O'Connell; Karl Malden; Raymond Massey
- Cinematography: Robert Burks
- Edited by: Frederic Knudtson
- Music by: Henry Mancini
- Production company: Universal International Pictures
- Distributed by: Universal Pictures
- Release date: February 1961
- Running time: 113 minutes
- Country: United States
- Language: English
- Box office: $3 million

The Great Impostor is a 1961 American comedy-drama film based on the story of an impostor named Ferdinand Waldo Demara. Loosely based on Robert Crichton's 1959 biography of the same name, it stars Tony Curtis in the title role and was directed by Robert Mulligan. The film only generally follows Demara's real-life exploits, and is much lighter in tone than the book on which it is based.

== Plot ==
Ferdinand Waldo Demara, a man known by many identities, is arrested by state police on an island in New England. He recalls the events that brought him to his arrest.

Demara drops out of high school and joins the United States Army. He aspires to become an officer but is denied due to his lack of a high school diploma. He fakes credentials to join the United States Marine Corps.

When his credentials are discovered to be false, Demara faces military jail time. He fakes his suicide and hides out in a Trappist monastery. After being asked to return to the regular world, Demara is identified as a wanted Marine and jailed in a military prison. There, on the eve of being released early for good behavior, Demara persuades the warden to share the details of his life with him. After being released, he steals the warden's identity and gets a job as the aide to the warden of a large Texas penitentiary. Demara starts a relationship with Eulalie, the warden's daughter. However, he is recognized by an inmate that knew him in military prison; threatened by blackmail, Demara quits and flees.

Demara impersonates a doctor and joins the Royal Canadian Navy. After falling in love with an RCN nurse, Catherine Lacey, Demara is assigned to a destroyer bound for the war in Korea. He is immediately pressed into performing a tooth extraction on the ship's captain. In Korean waters, he treats nineteen South Korean battle casualties, including three that need immediate surgery. The soldiers survive, and Demara is hailed as a hero. On shore, he sets up a hospital for the local Koreans and treats all who need help.

When the ensuing international publicity of Demara's exploits reaches the doctor he is impersonating, he is exposed and once again faced with military imprisonment. A court-martial looms and ship captain Nurse Lacey, along with others who have seen Demara's good side, vow to testify on his behalf. Their promise feeds into an already heavy media frenzy. Weighing potential disrepute on the Royal Canadian Navy against Demara's status as a hero, the board of inquiry grants him a swift, under-the-radar general discharge. Demara becomes a teacher in rural New England and is apprehended by state police, but easily escapes.

The Federal Bureau of Investigation begins building a case against a man accused of identity theft. Demara arrives at the FBI headquarters, impersonating a federal agent who is assigned to hunt down the imposter.

== Cast ==
- Tony Curtis as Demara
- Edmond O'Brien as Capt. Glover
- Gary Merrill as Pa Demara
- Karl Malden as Father Devlin
- Raymond Massey as the Abbot
- Joan Blackman as Lt. Catherine Lacey
- Arthur O'Connell as Warden Chandler
- Jeanette Nolan as Ma Demara
- Sue Ane Langdon as Eulalie
- Frank Gorshin as Barney
- Robert Middleton as Lt. Brown
- Mike Kellin as Clifford Thompson (inmate)
- Dick Sargent as Hotchkiss
- Doodles Weaver as Farmer Hauling Fertilizer
- Jerry Paris as Defense Lieutenant
- Cindi Wood as WAC Lieutenant

== Reception ==
=== Critical response ===
A.H. Weiler of The New York Times wrote: "...the film is not a harebrained exaggeration of the facts. But the story, enhanced by the serio-comic talents of Tony Curtis in the title role, add up to an odd-ball, but engaging, movie. ...Variety, it's been pointed out, is the spice of life, and Demara's life, as presented here, appears to be spicy beyond compare, but the record backs our adventurer fully. ...Suffice it to say that Mr. Curtis, running this gamut of adventures, seriously as well as with a wink, contributes the necessary light touch that makes palatable this derring-do based on factual data."

Metacritic, which uses a weighted average, assigned the film a score of 66 out of 100, based on four critics, indicating "generally favorable" reviews.

=== Awards ===
- Nominee: Best director - Directors Guild of America (Robert Mulligan)

== See also ==
- List of American films of 1961
- Catch Me If You Can, a 2002 film based on the story of a convicted felon, Frank Abagnale Jr.
- The Pretender, a TV series
