= Jake Bernstein (journalist) =

American investigative journalist and author

Jake Bernstein is an American investigative journalist and author. He previously worked with the International Consortium of Investigative Journalists. During a 25-year career, he has reported on the civil war in Central America, industrial pollution in Texas, political corruption in Miami, system-crashing greed on Wall Street, and the secret world of offshore accounts and money laundering. He has written travel pieces, reviewed movies and books, and has appeared as a radio and TV journalist.

His 2017 book, Secrecy World: Inside the Panama Papers Investigation of Illicit Money Networks and the Global Elite, takes an in-depth look at the evolution of offshore financial assets, as seen through the Panama Papers, and the journalists and investigators who tried to break through its secrecy. The book was made into a feature film titled The Laundromat, directed by Steven Soderbergh. Bernstein received an executive producer credit on the film.

== Early life ==
Bernstein born in the U.S. to Jewish parents on the 14th February 1969 to actress Judith Braun and Walter Bernstein, an Academy Award-nominated screenwriter. His brother is director Andrew Bernstein.

== Career ==
Bernstein speaks Spanish and began his journalism career in Latin America as a freelancer. After a brief stint at The Pasadena Citizen, Bernstein joined the Miami New Times as a staff writer and reporter (1997–2002), where he covered political corruption and media and the environment with stories including the fight over Elián González, Everglades restoration and the 2000 presidential recount.

=== The Texas Observer ===
In mid-2002, Bernstein joined The Texas Observer as a reporter and editor, and became executive editor in 2004, serving through 2008. During his tenure at the Observer, Bernstein covered stories on government surveillance, Tom DeLay's money laundering legislative takeover and the demographic shift in Texas. Under his leadership, Utne Reader named The Texas Observer, Best Political Magazine of 2005.

=== ProPublica ===
Bernstein joined ProPublica in 2008, shortly after its founding, where he worked as a business reporter. In 2011, he and a colleague won the Pulitzer Prize for National Reporting for coverage of Wall Street in the lead up to the financial crisis. In 2014, Bernstein broke the story of the secret tapes of Carmen Segarra, a whistleblower bank examiner with the Federal Reserve Bank of New York. The story prompted a U.S. Senate hearing.

=== Panama Papers ===
Bernstein worked as senior reporter as part of the International Consortium of Investigative Journalists on the Panama Papers. In addition to sharing a byline on the main story, Bernstein also authored the consortium's piece on the Russian findings in All Putin's Men: Secret Records Reveal Money Network Tied to Russian Leader and the story on The Art of Secrecy in the offshore world. The project won the Pulitzer Prize for Explanatory Reporting and was a Pulitzer finalist for International Reporting.

Bernstein signed with United Talent Agency (UTA) to sell the book for film and television.

== Bibliography ==
- VICE: Dick Cheney and the Hijacking of the American Presidency, by Lou Dubose and Jake Bernstein. Random House, 2006. ISBN 1400065763, 978-1400065769
- Secrecy World: Inside the Panama Papers Investigation of Illicit Money Networks and the Global Elite, by Jake Bernstein. Macmillan Audio, 2017. ISBN 1427290792, 978-1427290793

== Awards ==
Year	Award	Organization	Work	Result
2017	The Pulitzer Prize	Explanatory Reporting	"Panama Papers"	Won
2017	The Pulitzer Prize	International Reporting	"Panama Papers"	Finalist
2017	Polk Award	Financial Reporting	"Panama Papers"	Won
2011	The Pulitzer Prize	National Reporting	"The Wall Street Money Machine"	Won
2011	Goldsmith Award	Goldsmith Prize for Investigative Reporting	"The Wall Street Money Machine"	Finalist
2011	The IRE Awards	Investigative Reporters and Editors Inc.		Finalist
2012	Best Business Writing	Columbia University		Awarded
2013	Best Business Writing	Columbia University		Awarded

== See also ==
- International Consortium of Investigative Journalists
- List of people named in the Panama Papers
- The Laundromat — 2019 film, with screenplay based on Secrecy World
