= No Minor Vices =

1948 film by Lewis Milestone

- 1948 US Theatrical Poster
- Directed by: Lewis Milestone
- Screenplay by: Arnold Manoff
- Story by: Arnold Manoff
- Produced by: Lewis Milestone
- Starring: Dana Andrews; Lilli Palmer; Louis Jourdan; Jane Wyatt; Norman Lloyd
- Cinematography: George Barnes
- Edited by: Robert Parrish
- Music by: Franz Waxman
- Production company: Enterprise
- Distributed by: Metro-Goldwyn-Mayer
- Release date: November 12, 1948 (US Theatrical)
- Running time: 96 minutes
- Country: United States
- Language: English
- Box office: $643,000

No Minor Vices is a 1948 American black-and-white comedy film written by Arnold Manoff and directed by Lewis Milestone with Robert Aldrich as 1st assistant director. Created for David Loew's Enterprise Productions, it was the first of three films distributed by Metro-Goldwyn-Mayer after parting ways with United Artists, and was the last of four films made by Dana Andrews for director Milestone.

== Plot ==
Successful pediatrician Perry Ashwell (Dana Andrews) takes his attractive wife April (Lilli Palmer) and their conservative lifestyle for granted. When he allows artist Octavio Quaglini (Louis Jourdan) into their lives to sketch their "inner selves", Octavio becomes enamoured with April and tries to steal her away from Perry.

== Cast ==
- Dana Andrews as Perry Ashwell
- Lilli Palmer as April Ashwell
- Louis Jourdan as Octavio Quaglini
- Jane Wyatt as Miss Darlington
- Norman Lloyd as Dr. Sturdivant
- Bernard Gorcey as Mr. Zitzfleisch
- Roy Roberts as Mr. Felton
- Fay Baker as Mrs. Felton
- Sharon McManus as Gloria Felton
- Ann Doran as Mrs. Faraday
- Beau Bridges as Bertram
- Inna Gest as Mrs. Fleishgelt

== Background ==
After the expensive flop of Arch of Triumph bankrupted Enterprise Productions, a film which United Artists called "probably the greatest commercial failure in the history of motion pictures", No Minor Vices was conceived as a means to keep Enterprise going until all possible revenues could be gotten from Arch of Triumph. Enterprise co-founder Charles Einfeld gave Lewis Milestone the title No Minor Vices and suggested he create film to go with it.

Milestone called in friends to make the film, with Dana Andrews even investing some of his own money in the project, but losing his investment when the film bombed. Andrews felt that part of No Minor Vices poor box office showings were due to the film being released by MGM rather than by United Artists, and with MGM not doing a decent a job in promoting as might have UA. Milestone chose to "play it safe" with the film. In order to keep audiences interested in the simple plot line, Milestone would sometimes cut to a scene that had a little man in a window making cigars and reacting to things that had nothing to do with the scene just intercut. Film editor Robert Parrish reported that if a scene was lousy, Milestone could cut to this little guy, but the running gag was not enough upon which to build a film. No Minor Vices kept Enterprise alive as a company, but money was tight.

== Box office ==
The film was a box office flop. According to MGM records it earned $479,000 in the US and Canada and $164,000 overseas.

== Critical response ==
The New York Times praised the film, writing that it was a "brand of frivolous spoofing that is very rare on the screen—so rare, indeed, that it is difficult even to understand." They refer to the film as "cubist humor" that spoofs in the manner of Gertrude Stein, making a "very original film". They further offered that the film was directed by Lewis Milestone for the defunct Enterprise Productions, and that the three main stars are good as they play their roles "in the grand and sweeping style." Hal Erickson of Allmovie wrote "No Minor Vices doesn't always work, but it's fun to watch Louis Jourdan plug his way through a role that Burgess Meredith or Hans Conried could have played blindfolded." Jane Lockhart of The Rotarian wrote that with "Prolonged attempt to symbolic, whimsical turns out to be faintly boring long before the end is reached."

== Awards and nominations ==
- 1949, Writers Guild of America WGA Award nomination for 'Best Written American Comedy'

== Release ==
The film had international film and television release: In Germany as Eine Frau zuviel, in Finland as Katselen ihmisiä, in Poland as Kobieta bez skazy, in Sweden as Kyss mej långsamt, in Spain as Ningún vicio menor, and in Italy as Tra moglie e marito. For its 1959 Danish television debut, it was titled Tre er én for mange.
