= Judy Crichton =

American television producer (1929–2007)

Judy Crichton (November 25, 1929 – October 14, 2007) was an American television news and documentary producer.

Judy Crichton began her career in television in the 1950s as a writer and producer on the game show, I've Got A Secret.

In 1971, Crichton and Chester Feldman produced Original Cast Album: Company, a documentary directed by D.A. Pennebaker about the making of the Broadway cast album of the Stephen Sondheim musical Company.

In 1974, Crichton joined CBS Reports, the CBS network documentary division, as its first woman producer. In 1977, Crichton directed and co-produced "The CIA's Secret Army". The documentary, hosted by Bill Moyers, detailed the terrorist activities of anti-Castro Cuban exiles in Miami.

Later, Crichton produced and directed The Battle for South Africa, also reported by Bill Moyers. The Battle for South Africa was one of the first US media reports to focus on the role of the African National Congress (ANC) and to interview future South Africa president, Thabo Mbeki. According to Thabo Mbeki, the ANC resisted contact with US media for fear that they were CIA plants, but Crichton and Mbeki were able to establish trust once they met one another in person.

In 1981, Crichton produced, co-wrote and co-directed a five-part documentary series on national defense and nuclear power, The Defense of the United States, for which she won three Emmy awards.

In 1982, Crichton moved to ABC News to work as a producer and writer on ABC Close-Up. In 1982, she won a DuPont Award for Oh, Tell the World What Happened, a documentary about the massacre of Palestinian refugees at Sabra and Shatila in Lebanon.

In 1987, Crichton became the founding executive producer of the PBS history series, American Experience, and remained in that role until her retirement in 1996. During Crichton's tenure as executive producer, the series won 6 Peabody Awards; 2 DuPont Award Awards; 5 Writers Guild Awards; 5 OAH Awards; and 7 Emmy Awards.

In 1998, the Writers Guild of America, East awarded Crichton with the Evelyn F. Burkey Award. The Evelyn F. Burkey Award recognizes its annual recipient as one "whose contributions have brought honor and dignity to writers everywhere."

In November 1998, Holt published Crichton's book, America 1900: The Turning Point, about the pivotal historic and cultural events of 1900. The book served as a companion volume to an American Experience documentary of the same name.

In 2000, President Bill Clinton awarded the National Humanities Medal to Crichton for her work bringing history to television as the founder and executive producer of the American Experience series. In awarding the medal to Crichton, President Clinton said, "In creating and producing the PBS series the American Experience, she set a new standard for what television documentaries can be. With talent, passion and purpose, Judy Crichton has elevated a medium she loves and lifted all those who watch it." The National Endowment for the Humanities citation quoted Crichton as saying that "history is filled with magnificent stories."

Crichton's posthumous memoir about her marriage, Portrait of a Marriage, was published in 2024 and described by Kirkus Reviews as a "tour-de-force memoir of a heartrending marriage."

== Personal life ==
Crichton was married to novelist Robert Crichton until his death in 1993. The couple had 4 children. Her daughter, Sarah Crichton, is an editor and publisher. Judy Crichton died of leukemia on October 14, 2007.
