= Horizons West =

1952 film

- Theatrical Poster
- Directed by: Budd Boetticher
- Screenplay by: Louis Stevens
- Story by: Louis Stevens
- Produced by: Albert J. Cohen
- Starring: Robert Ryan; Julia Adams; Rock Hudson
- Cinematography: Charles P. Boyle
- Edited by: Ted J. Kent
- Color process: Technicolor
- Production company: Universal Pictures
- Distributed by: Universal Pictures
- Release date: October 1, 1952 (Chicago)
- Running time: 81 minutes
- Country: United States
- Language: English

Horizons West is a 1952 American Western film directed by Budd Boetticher and starring Robert Ryan, Julia Adams and Rock Hudson.

== Plot ==
After the Civil War, brothers Dan and Neil Hammond return to their parents' Texas ranch. Neil is content to simply help operate the ranch, but Dan's ambition is to build an empire in the manner of ruthless business tycoon Cord Hardin. Hardin's wife Lorna has a romantic interest in Dan. After a series of confrontations between Dan and Hardin results in Hardin's death, Dan and Lorna begin a relationship.

Dan becomes a powerful figure, overseeing a vast enterprise that involves rustling horses and buying land by taking advantage of lenient laws. He corrupts many officials and makes many enemies. When the marshal of Austin is relieved of duty because of his association with Dan, Neil becomes the law, and a violent showdown between the brothers is inevitable.

== Cast ==
- Robert Ryan as Dan Hammond
- Julia Adams as Mrs Lorna Hardin
- Rock Hudson as Neil Hammond
- Judith Braun as Sally Eaton
- John McIntire as Ira Hammond
- Raymond Burr as Cord Hardin
- James Arness as Tiny McGilligan
- Dennis Weaver as Dandy Taylor
- Frances Bavier as Martha Hammond
- Tom Powers as Frank Tarleton
- John Hubbard as Sam Hunter
- Rodolfo Acosta as Gen. José Escobar Lopez
- Douglas Fowley as Ed Tompkins
- Walter Reed as Layton
- Raymond Greenleaf as Eli Dodson
- Dan Poore as Cy
- Frank Chase as Borden
- Mae Clarke as Jane Tarleton

== Reception ==
In a contemporary review for The New York Times, critic Howard Thompson wrote: "A few sturdy attempts at acting and passable Technicolor fail to offset the musty flabbiness of 'Horizons West' ... Louis Stevens, who wrote the scenario from his own story, has piled on so many stray cliches and shoot-'em-up embellishments that neither his protagonist nor the film holds much punch or conviction. And while the director, Budd Boetticher, does keep the revolvers smoking and the citizens cringing, the cast is left to dodge bullets more or less on its own resources."

The Chicago Tribune wrote: "Thanks to an expert cast, this western is a bit more palatable than the average, in spite of its stereotyped plot. ... Mr. Ryan is convincingly ruthless, Rock Hudson believably normal and peace-loving, and the color photografy [sic] enhances the story considerably."
