= Romance of a Horsethief =

- Directed by: Abraham Polonsky
- Written by: David Opatoshu
- Based on: novel by Joseph Opatoshu
- Produced by: Gene Gutowski
- Starring: Yul Brynner; Eli Wallach
- Cinematography: Piero Portalupi
- Edited by: Kevin Connor
- Music by: Mort Shuman
- Production companies: Jadran Film; International Film Company; Prima Cinematografica
- Distributed by: Allied Artists
- Release date: 1971
- Running time: 101 minutes
- Countries: France; Italy; Yugoslavia
- Language: English

Romance of a Horsethief (French: Le roman d'un voleur de chevaux; Italian: Il romanzo di un ladro di cavalli; Serbo-Croatian: Romansa konjokradice) is a 1971 French-Italian-Yugoslav adventure film directed by Abraham Polonsky. It is loosely based on the 1917 novel with the same name by Joseph Opatoshu.

== Plot summary ==
In Polish Russia, Stoloff, a Cossack in exile has gained control over a Jewish village. The villagers live by horse-thievery and under the leadership of Kifke. Stoloff's regime is tolerated until he commandeers the village's horses for the Russian army. Naomi has been away in France and gotten ideas of a revolution and inspires the town to resist. This gets Naomi into deep trouble, from which only Kifke and his compatriot Zanvil can rescue her. Zanvil is highly motivated since he is in love with Naomi.

== Cast ==
- Yul Brynner as Captain Stoloff
- Eli Wallach as Kifke
- Jane Birkin as Naomi
- Lainie Kazan as Estusha
- David Opatoshu as Schloime Kradnik
- Serge Gainsbourg as Sigmund
- Henri Serre as Mendel (credited as Henri Sera)
- Linda Veras as Countess Grabowsky
- Marilù Tolo as Manka
- Branko Plesa as Lt. Vishinsky
- Vladimir Bacic as Gruber
- Branko Spoljar as Strugatch
- Alenka Rancic as Sura
- Oliver Tobias as Zanvill Kradnik

== Production ==
Filming began in July 1970 in Yugoslavia. Polonsky called the film "a fairytale, pretending to affect an older style but in fact the contrary."

== Reception ==
The Los Angeles Times called the film "impressive... a rollicking folk tale."
