= Robert Crichton (novelist) =

American novelist (1925–1993)

Robert Crichton (January 29, 1925 – March 23, 1993) was an American novelist.

== Family ==
Crichton's father, Kyle Crichton, was a writer/editor for Collier's magazine with experience as a coal miner and steel worker; he wrote novels and biographies (including a biography of the Marx Brothers) and also wrote for the communist publications The New Masses and the Daily Worker using the name Robert Forsythe, publishing a collection of articles that was entitled Redder Than the Rose.

== Early life ==
Robert Crichton was born on January 29, 1925, in Albuquerque, New Mexico and grew up in Bronxville, New York. He graduated from Harvard College in 1951.

== Career ==
Crichton joined the army and served in the infantry during World War II, and was wounded during the Battle of the Bulge in 1944. Before returning to the United States, he managed an ice cream factory on the outskirts of Paris; it was, he said, his decompression chamber. He attended Harvard University using the GI Bill and was a member of the famed class of 1950.

Crichton's first book, The Great Impostor, published in 1959, was the true, if picaresque, story of Fred Demara, an impostor who successfully assumed scores of guises including serving as a Trappist monk, a Texas prison warden and a practicing surgeon in the Royal Canadian Navy. The book was a bestseller and adapted into a successful 1961 movie of the same name with Tony Curtis as the protagonist. Crichton's second book, The Rascal and the Road, was a memoir about his escapades with Demara. The non-fiction books were "hack-work", he said, written to provide for a growing family.

In 1966, he published his first novel, The Secret of Santa Vittoria. The New York Times critic Orville Prescott wrote: "If I had my way the publication of Robert Crichton's brilliant novel...would be celebrated with fanfares of trumpets, with the display of banners and with festivals in the streets." The book was on the New York Times bestseller list for more than 50 weeks, with 18 of them at the top of the list, and became an international bestseller. Set in an Italian hill-town and telling the story of local resistance to the Nazis during World War II, the novel was adapted into a Golden Globe-winning movie of the same name by Stanley Kramer in 1969, featuring Anthony Quinn.

Crichton's second and last novel, The Camerons, published by Knopf in 1972, was adapted from the lives of his great-grandparents, a Scottish coal mining family. It too was a bestseller. He had intended to write a sequel, but the work was never completed.

Among many magazine articles, he was known best for an essay, "Our Air War," about Frank Harvey's book, Air War: Vietnam, published by The New York Review of Books in 1968.

== Personal life and death ==
Crichton was married to Judy Crichton (1929–2007), the first woman documentary producer at CBS Reports, CBS's documentary unit, and the founding executive producer of the PBS historical documentary series, The American Experience. They had four children: Sarah Crichton, publisher and writer; Rob Crichton, lawyer; Jennifer Crichton, teacher and writer; Susan Crichton, who is deceased.

A brother, Andrew S. Crichton, was a senior editor of Sports Illustrated from its founding in 1954 until 1976. A nephew, Kyle Crichton, is an editor for the Foreign Desk of The New York Times.

Robert Crichton died age 68 on March 23, 1993, in New Rochelle, New York.

== Works ==
Books

- The Great Impostor (1959)
- The Rascal and the Road (1961, autobiography)
- The Secret of Santa Vittoria (1966)
- The Camerons (1972)

Articles

- "Our Air War," The New York Review of Books (1968)
