= Judith Braun =

American actress (1930–2021)

- Born: February 16, 1930; New York City, U.S.
- Died: June 24, 2021 (aged 91); New York, U.S.
- Years active: 1951-1962
- Spouse: Walter Bernstein (m. 1960; div. 1984)
- Children: Nicholas Bernstein; Andrew Bernstein; Jake Bernstein

Judith Braun (February 16, 1930 – June 24, 2021) was an American actress, with a career spanning two decades, acting in dramas in the 1950s and 1960s.

== Early life ==
Braun was born February 16, 1930, in New York City. Her father was an accomplished lawyer and wanted her to go into the legal industry, but she chose acting as a career.

== Roles ==
Braun was mainly active in the 1950s and 1960s. She initially acted in MGM movies, in particular starring in a number of Budd Boetinger dramas. One of her early breakout roles was in Red Ball Express where she played a Red Cross officer, coming between the two lead characters played by Jeff Chandler and Art Grey. She went on to play supporting roles in Horizons West and Flame of Araby in the early 1950s.

After a number of film parts, she acted in TV roles including Perry Mason and Shirley Temple's Storybook, from the later 1950s through the 1960s, eventually retiring in 1962.

== Personal life ==
Braun lived in New York, and was married to famed blacklisted writer, Walter Bernstein from 1960, with whom she had three children, Nicholas Bernstein, Andrew Bernstein, and Jake Bernstein before her divorce in 1984. She died in New York on June 24, 2021, at the age of 91.
