= Semi-Tough =

1977 US sports comedy film by Michael Ritchie

- film poster by Robert McGinnis
- Directed by: Michael Ritchie
- Screenplay by: Walter Bernstein
- Based on: Semi-Tough; 1972 novel by Dan Jenkins
- Produced by: David Merrick
- Starring: Burt Reynolds; Kris Kristofferson; Jill Clayburgh; Robert Preston
- Cinematography: Charles Rosher Jr.
- Edited by: Richard A. Harris
- Music by: Jerry Fielding
- Distributed by: United Artists
- Release date: November 18, 1977
- Running time: 108 minutes
- Country: United States
- Language: English
- Budget: $5.7 million
- Box office: $37.2 million

Semi-Tough is a 1977 American sports comedy film directed by Michael Ritchie, and starring Burt Reynolds, Kris Kristofferson, Jill Clayburgh, Robert Preston, Lotte Lenya, and Bert Convy. Set in the world of American professional football, Semi-Tough follows buddies Billy Clyde Puckett and Marvin 'Shake' Tiller, who have a third roommate, Barbara Jane Bookman. A romance develops between Shake and Barbara Jane when he becomes self-confident after completing a self awareness course called "B.E.A.T.", at which point Billy Clyde slyly makes a play to win her for himself.

Based on the 1972 novel of the same name by Dan Jenkins, the screenplay by Ritchie and Walter Bernstein adds a new storyline that includes a satire of the self-help movement and new religions. The film includes a parody of Werner Erhard's Erhard Seminars Training (est), depicted in the film as an organization called "B.E.A.T.". The film received mixed reviews, with some praising its parodies of the est training, Erhard and other new age movements such as Rolfing, and others criticizing the script and direction, noting that some of Ritchie's previous films had more of a personal tone. Still, other reviews lamented the film's departure from the source material, which dealt with football rather than the new age movement.

== Plot ==
Wide receiver Marvin "Shake" Tiller and running back Billy Clyde Puckett are football buddies who play for a Miami pro team owned by "Big Ed" Bookman. Bookman's daughter Barbara Jane is roommates with both men, and the film depicts a subtle love triangle relationship developing between Barbara Jane and her two friends. Initially the three of them are just good friends, but she begins to have romantic feelings for Shake, who has become more self-confident after taking self-improvement training from seminar leader Friedrich Bismark. The program is called Bismark Energy Action Training, or B.E.A.T. After Shake completes his course, Barbara Jane and he have sex and start a relationship. They plan to marry after the football season ends.

Barbara Jane is not a follower of B.E.A.T., and Shake is warned by his leader Bismark that "mixed marriages don't work". Barbara Jane is determined to make it work, so she attends B.E.A.T. in an effort to "get it". At the end of the long training session, she is worn out from Bismark's "sadistic abuse, pious drivel, and sheer double talk". She also feels guilty that she did not "get it". Shake is insistent that the training has had proven results for him, noting that he has not dropped a football pass since completing B.E.A.T.

Billy Clyde also has feelings for Barbara Jane and, without telling Shake or Barbara Jean beforehand, enrolls in the same B.E.A.T. training session as Barbara Jane in order to understand what she is going through. In the training, Billy Clyde is shown coping successfully with the seminar rules that prohibit going to the bathroom or talking to other trainees. When the trainees are encouraged to express their most repressed feelings, he exhibits the strongest, most primal display of them all. Shake is surprised to see Billy Clyde emerge from Barbara Jane's B.E.A.T. training session. Billy Clyde "confesses" to Shake that he took the training so that he'd be able to mock it more effectively afterwards, but says that he actually "got it". For a time, he pretends he underwent a conversion to Bismark's way of thinking, often using B.E.A.T. terminology and clichés in everyday conversation.

Shake worries that Barbara Jane hasn't "gotten it", and Billy Clyde tries to reassure Shake that it doesn't matter, but Shake remains dubious. During the wedding, as Big Ed escorts Barbara Jane to the altar, the minister turns to Bismark and gives him some advice on how he can avoid capital gains tax in his business. When the minister asks Shake if he takes Barbara Jane to be his wife, he hesitates and finally says "no". An outraged Big Ed vows to trade Shake to the worst team in the league, then tells Bismark to "experience this" as he punches him in the face, starting a general brawl. Billy Clyde makes a disparaging remark about Bismark to Barbara Jane, causing her to realize that he had been sandbagging all along about having "gotten it" from B.E.A.T. The two of them leave in the commotion, and reveal their feelings about each other as they walk along the beach in their wedding attire.

== Cast ==
- Burt Reynolds as Billy Clyde Puckett
- Kris Kristofferson as Marvin "Shake" Tiller
- Jill Clayburgh as Barbara Jane Bookman
- Robert Preston as Ed "Big Ed" Bookman
- Bert Convy as Friedrich Bismark
- Roger E. Mosley as "Puddin" Patterson Sr.
- Lotte Lenya as Clara Pelf
- Richard Masur as Phillip Hooper
- Carl Weathers as "Dreamer" Tatum
- Brian Dennehy as T.J. Lambert
- Mary Jo Catlett as Earlene Emery
- Joe Kapp as Hose Manning
- Ron Silver as Vlada Kostov
- Jim McKrell as Bud McNair
- Peter Bromilow as Kostov's Interpreter
- Norman Alden as Coach Alvin Parks
- Fred Stuthman as Minister
- Ed "Too Tall" Jones as Football Player
- Jerry Belson as Director
- Dick Schaap as Himself
- Lindsey Nelson as Himself
- Paul Hornung as Himself

== Production ==
=== Adaptation ===
Semi-Tough is based on the best-selling novel of the same name by Dan Jenkins, and the screenplay was written by Walter Bernstein. Bernstein and director Michael Ritchie used parts of Jenkins's novel and added parodies of self-help groups, new religions, and the Human Potential Movement. Ritchie was partially influenced by Adam Smith's book, Powers of Mind. Though the screenplay altered his original work, Dan Jenkins wrote that Semi-Tough "wasn't a horrible movie in my opinion". Jenkins later commented that the film adaptation of his book Baja Oklahoma was: "a lot more faithful to the novel than Semi-Tough ever was".

=== Preparation ===
Burt Reynolds began training with Kris Kristofferson to get in shape before film production. Before work began on the film, actor Bert Convy attended one of Werner Erhard's est training sessions to prepare for his role as B.E.A.T. seminar leader Friedrich Bismark. Pro football stars were hired to give realism to the film, including John Matuszak, Paul Hornung, Joe Kapp, and Ed "Too Tall" Jones. The football scenes were shot at the Cotton Bowl.

== Parodies of self-improvement, new religions ==
Bernstein and Ritchie's modified screenplay based on Jenkins' book includes a storyline with "satiric jabs" at new religions, self-improvement, and the Human Potential Movement. A form of Rolfing is also parodied in the film by Lotte Lenya, whose character Clara Pelf is seen as a spoof of "a Rolf-like masseuse". Big Ed Bookman (Robert Preston) is seen crawling around on all fours practicing something called "creep therapy" or "movagenics". Movagenics is seen in the film as a way for individuals to find their "lost center of consciousness". Big Ed Bookman is also shown proselytizing for "Movagenics", a fictional group in the film which Time referred to in its review as both a cult and a new faith.

The film includes a parody with B.E.A.T. as a stand-in for est. In American Film Now, Friedrich Bismark is simply described as "the Werner Erhard character". The Grove Book of Hollywood describes Bert Convy as a "Werner Erhard-lookalike", in his portrayal of Friedrich Bismark. Barbara Jane Bookman (Jill Clayburgh)'s guilty feelings for not "getting it" after completing her B.E.A.T. seminar are seen as a reference to: "how creeds like est put nonbelievers on the defensive". The book also notes: "The film captures the peculiar mixture of spirituality and pragmatism that surrounded est", and also describes the minister's capital gains tax advice to Friedrich Bismark at Shake's wedding as "sardonic". A 1977 review in TIME refers to Friedrich Bismark's B.E.A.T. as "an est-like movement", and notes: "the Ritchie-Bernstein version of an est seminar is done with marvelous malice". Psychiatry and the Cinema characterizes the film as a "devastating parody" of the est training.

After Semi-Tough's release in 1977, Bert Convy was contacted by a number of est followers, as well as by Werner Erhard. After Convy appeared on The Tonight Show Starring Johnny Carson and discussed his experiences attending Erhard Seminars Training in preparation for his role as Friedrich Bismark, he received a letter from Erhard stating: "it would be great for us to get together". Of the est seminar itself, Convy recalled that when another attendee complained of a headache during the course, the group leader told him to "experience it", and when another attendee wet his pants, he was told to "experience the warmth". In a scene from the film, a woman exclaims to Friedrich Bismark in the middle of a seminar: "I peed in my pants and it felt good." During actual filming on Semi-Tough, Convy received a late-night phone call from actress Valerie Harper, known in Hollywood as a devoted student of Werner Erhard. She related to Convy that Erhard was "pleased" with the role, and she wished him success in the film. Convy suspected that her real reason for calling was to subtly pressure him to go easy on his parody of Erhard in the film. Harper is mentioned by name in the completed film.

== Reception ==
=== Box office and releases ===
The film grossed $37,187,139 at the box office. Semi-Tough was later developed as a short-lived television series with a similar theme, and was a candidate to be picked up in the fall of 1980. The 1980 series starred Bruce McGill playing Burt Reynolds' original role Billy Clyde Puckett, with co-star David Hasselhoff. The film has since been released in both VHS and DVD formats.

=== Awards ===
In 1978, Walter Bernstein received a nomination for a Writers Guild of America Award from the Writers Guild of America in the Best Comedy Adapted from Another Medium category, for his adaptation of Dan Jenkins' novel at the 30th Writers Guild of America Awards.

=== Critical reception ===
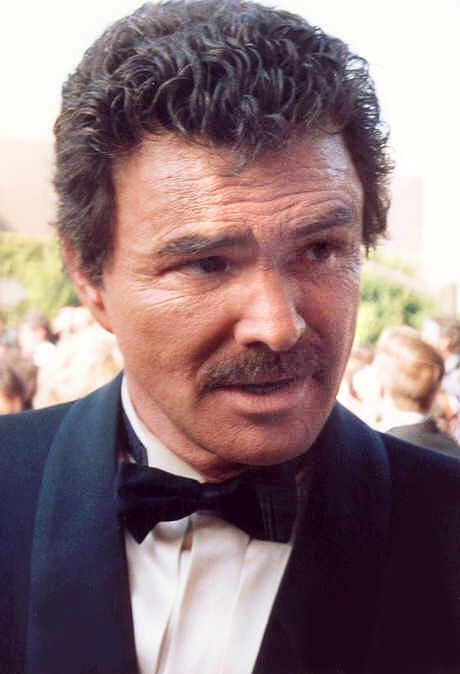
Burt Reynolds, 1991: Leonard Maltin wrote that Reynolds' charm made up for deficiencies in the script of Semi-Tough.

The press disagreed on the satire of Erhard in the film, some praising it, some not. The Wall Street Journal criticized the film, save for its satirical nature: "The movie isn't much - an erratic ramble - but it has some pleasant moments, and a delicious send-up of the self-improvement guru Werner Erhard." The Charlotte Observer praised Bert Convy's portrayal of the self-help guru Frederick Bismark, and called Convy: "… a hilariously smug consciousness-raiser with a more than passing resemblance to EST's [sic] Werner Erhard". Magill's Survey of Cinema described the film as a chiding of American "religious fads and philosophies", and The Grove Book of Hollywood called it a "cheeky film" that poked fun at the "est" craze and other human potential fads. Time called the film one of 1977's best comedies, and also noted that it was: "without a doubt the year's most socially useful film".

The film did not receive a positive review in Variety, where the reviewer commented: "Semi-Tough begins as a bawdy and lively romantic comedy about slap-happy pro football players, then slows down to a too-inside putdown of contemporary self-help programs." Variety noted that stars Burt Reynolds, Kris Kristofferson, and Jill Clayburgh were "excellent" within the "zigzag" script and poor direction they were given. Michael Costello of AllMovie also criticized the script, and wrote: "While much of this is quite predictable, a number of the jokes score, Burt Reynolds works his charm overtime, and Jill Clayburgh and Kris Kristofferson are effective as comic foils." In American Film Now, author James Monaco commented on director Michael Ritchie's directing style in Semi-Tough, stating that in the film Ritchie was "speaking in a professional voice". Monaco noted that Ritchie's prior films evoked a more personal tone, and had more of a sense of wonder than Semi-Tough.

Chapman's In Search of Stupidity characterized the film as: "Possibly one of the best movies ever made by Burt Reynolds", and described the film's parody of est as accurate and amusing. Leonard Maltin criticized parts of the script, stating that Reynolds' charm filled in for the film's other deficiencies. I. Moyer Hunsberger criticized Ritchie's screenplay adaptation in his work The Quintessential Dictionary, complaining that the game of football should have supported the film as a plot device, but was instead left to the side in favor of other stories.

== See also ==
- List of American football films
