= 30th Writers Guild of America Awards =

30th WGA Awards
- Date: 1978
- Organized by: Writers Guild of America, East and the Writers Guild of America, West

The 30th Writers Guild of America Awards honored the best film writers and television writers of 1977. Winners were announced in 1978.

== Winners and nominees ==
=== Film ===
Winners are listed first highlighted in boldface.

**Best Drama Written Directly for the Screen**: **The Turning Point, Written by Arthur Laurents**; Close Encounters of the Third Kind, Written by Steven Spielberg; The Late Show, Written by Robert Benton; Saturday Night Fever, Written by Norman Wexler	**Best Comedy Written Directly for the Screen**: **Annie Hall, Written by Woody Allen and Marshall Brickman**; The Goodbye Girl, Written by Neil Simon; Star Wars, Written by George Lucas; Slap Shot, Written by Nancy Dowd
**Best Drama Adapted from Another Medium**: **Julia, Screenplay by Alvin Sargent; Based on the story by Lillian Hellman**; I Never Promised You a Rose Garden, Screenplay by Gavin Lambert and Lewis John Carlino; Based on the novel by Joanne Greenberg; Islands in the Stream, Screenplay by Denne Bart Petitclerc; Based on the novel by Ernest Hemingway; Looking for Mr. Goodbar, Screenplay by Richard Brooks; Based on the novel by Judith Rossner	**Best Comedy Adapted from Another Medium**: **Oh, God!, Screenplay by Larry Gelbart; Based on the novel by Avery Corman**; Semi-Tough, Screenplay by Walter Bernstein; Based on the novel by Dan Jenkins; The Spy Who Loved Me, Screenplay by Christopher Wood and Richard Maibaum; Based on the characters by Ian Fleming

=== Television ===
**Episodic Comedy**: **"Archie Gets the Business" – All in the Family (CBS) – Larry Rhine and Mel Tolkin**; "The Joy of Sex" – All in the Family (CBS) – Erik Tarloff; "Good-Bye, Mr. Fish: Part 2" – Barney Miller (ABC) – Reinhold Weege; "Copy Cat" – Barney Miller (ABC) – Douglas Wyman and Tony Sheehan; "Fade Out, Fade In" – M*A*S*H (CBS) – James Fritzell and Everett Greenbaum; "A Jackie Story" – The Bob Newhart Show (CBS) – Lloyd Garver; "A Girl in Her Twenties" – The Bob Newhart Show (CBS) – Laura Levine; "Once a Friend" – The Jeffersons (CBS) – Michael S. Baser and Kim Weiskopf; "The Last Show" – The Mary Tyler Moore Show (CBS) – James L. Brooks, Allan Burns, Ed. Weinberger, Stan Daniels, David Lloyd and Bob Ellison; "The Critic" – The Mary Tyler Moore Show (CBS) – David LLoyd	**Episodic Drama**: **"Tirigger Point" – Police Story (NBC) – Mark Rodgers**; "The Gipper Caper" – Eight Is Enough (ABC) – William Blinn; "Housewarming" – Lou Grant (CBS) – Leonora Thuna; "Christmas" – Lou Grant (CBS) – David Lloyd; "Merry Christmas Waldo" – Police Woman (NBC) – E. Arthur Kean; "Quickie Nirvana" – The Rockford Files (NBC) – David Chase; "Beamer's Last Case" – The Rockford Files (NBC) – Stephen J. Cannell, Booker Bradshaw and Calvin Kelly
**Daytime Serials**: **Ryan's Hope (ABC) – Paul Avila Mayer, Claire Labine and Mary Munisteri**; Days of Our Lives (NBC) – Patricia Falken Smith, William J. Bell, Bill Rega, Margaret Stewart and Kay Lenard; Love of Life (CBS) – Gabrielle Upton	**Children's Script - Episodic & Specials**: **Little Vic (ABC) – Art Wallace**; "Hewitt's Just Different" – ABC Afterschool Special (ABC) – Jan Artman; "The Pinballs" – ABC Afterschool Special (ABC) – Jim Inman; Once Upon a Brothers Grimm (CBS) – Jean Holloway
**Variety: Series or Special: Musical or Comedy**: **The Carol Burnett Show (CBS) – Ed Simmons, Roger Beatty, Rick Hawkins, Liz Sage, Bob Illes, James R. Stein, Franelle Silver, Larry Siegel, Tim Conway, Bill Richmond, Gene Perret, Dick Clair and Jenna McMahon**	

=== Special awards ===
Laurel Award for Screenwriting Achievement
**Edward Anhalt**
Laurel Award for TV Writing Achievement
**Ernest Kinoy**
Valentine Davies Award
**Norman Lear**
Morgan Cox Award
**John Furia**
