= The Front =

1976 American drama film by Martin Ritt

- theatrical release poster
- Directed by: Martin Ritt
- Written by: Walter Bernstein
- Produced by: Charles H. Joffe; Jack Rollins
- Starring: Woody Allen; Zero Mostel; Michael Murphy; Herschel Bernardi; Andrea Marcovicci
- Cinematography: Michael Chapman
- Edited by: Sidney Levin
- Music by: Dave Grusin
- Distributed by: Columbia Pictures
- Release date: September 17, 1976
- Running time: 95 minutes
- Country: United States
- Language: English

The Front is a 1976 American drama film set against the Hollywood blacklist in the 1950s, when artists, writers, directors, and others were rendered unemployable, having been accused of subversive political activities in support of Communism or of being Communists themselves. It was written by Walter Bernstein, directed by Martin Ritt, and stars Woody Allen, Zero Mostel (in his final live action role in a motion picture) and Michael Murphy.

Several people involved in the making of the film—including screenwriter Bernstein, director Ritt, and actors Mostel, Herschel Bernardi, and Lloyd Gough—had been blacklisted. The end credits list the year they were blacklisted alongside their respective credits. Bernstein was listed after being named in the Red Channels journal that identified alleged Communists and Communist sympathizers.

== Plot ==
In New York City, 1953, at the height of the anti-Communist investigations of the House Un-American Activities Committee (HUAC), television screenwriter Alfred Miller is blacklisted and cannot get work. He asks his friend Howard Prince, a restaurant cashier and small-time bookie, to sign his name to Miller's television scripts in exchange for ten percent of the money Miller makes from them, i.e. to serve as a "front" for Miller. Howard agrees out of friendship and because he needs the money. The scripts are submitted to network producer Phil Sussman, who is pleased to have a writer not on the television blacklist. Howard's script also offers a plum role for Hecky Brown, one of Sussman's top actors.

Howard becomes such a success that Miller's two fellow screenwriter friends hire him to be their front as well. The quality of the scripts and Howard's ability to write so many impresses Florence Barrett, Sussman's idealistic script editor, who mistakes him for a principled artist. Howard begins dating her but changes the subject whenever she wants to discuss his work.

As investigators expose and blacklist Communists in the entertainment industry, Hecky Brown is fired from the show because six years earlier he marched in a May Day parade and subscribed to The Daily Worker, although he tells the investigators he did it merely to impress a woman he wanted to have sex with. In order to clear his name from the blacklist, Hecky is instructed to find out more about Howard Prince's involvement with the Communist Party, so he invites him to the Catskills, where Hecky is booked to perform on stage. The club owner short-changes Hecky on his promised salary, and when Hecky confronts him, the club owner fires him, denouncing him as a "communist son of a bitch". The professional humiliation and the inability to provide for his wife and children take their toll on Hecky and he kills himself by jumping out of a hotel window.

Howard witnesses other harsh results of the investigative actions of the communist-hunting "Freedom Information Services" on the network's programming. Suspicion is cast his way, and he is called to testify before the House Un-American Activities Committee. Due to his despair after Hecky's death, Howard privately admits to Florence that he is not a writer, just a humble cashier.

Howard decides that he will respond to the committee's questions evasively, enabling him to neither admit nor deny anything. After briefly enduring the HUAC questioning – including being asked to speak ill of the dead Hecky Brown, and being threatened with legal consequences for his admission of having placed bets in his capacity as a bookie (which is illegal), Howard takes a stand, telling the Committee that he does not recognize their authority to ask him such questions, and telling them to "go fuck yourselves" before leaving the interrogation room. The film ends as Howard is taken away in handcuffs, with Florence kissing him good-bye, the three blacklisted writers shaking his hand and many protesters cheering him on.

== Cast ==
- Woody Allen as Howard Prince
- Zero Mostel as Hecky Brown
- Herschel Bernardi as Phil Sussman
- Michael Murphy as Alfred Miller
- Andrea Marcovicci as Florence Barrett
- Remak Ramsay as Francis X. Hennessey
- Marvin Lichterman as Myer Prince
- Lloyd Gough as Herbert Delaney
- David Margulies as William Phelps
- Danny Aiello as Danny LaGattuta
- Josef Sommer as Committee Chairman

== Reception ==
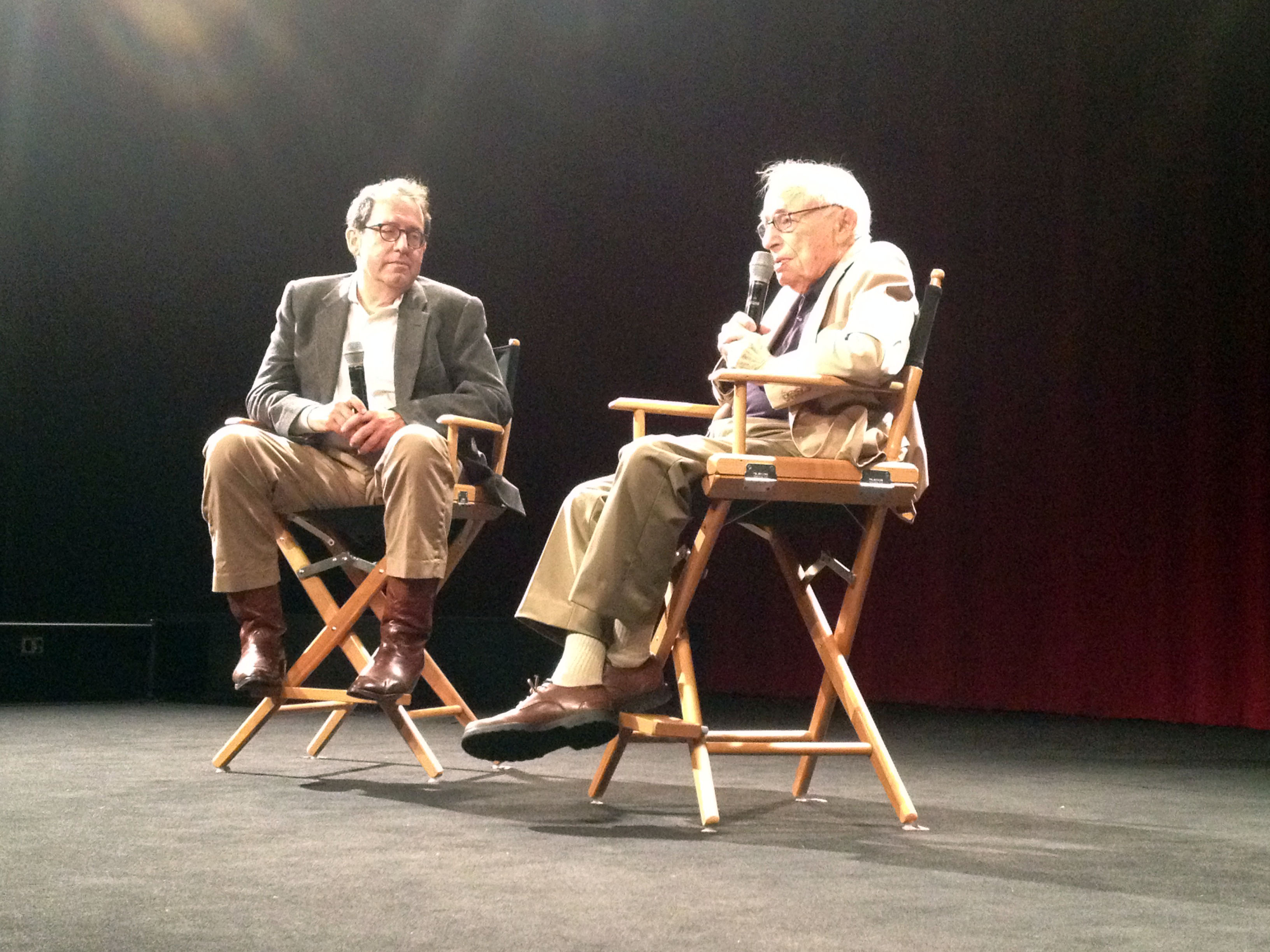
The film's screenwriter, Walter Bernstein (right), during a June 2016 Q&A with Sony Pictures Classics co-founder Michael Barker (left) at the SVA Theater in Manhattan, which followed a screening of the film

Critical reception of The Front was divided between those who thought it effectively and amusingly dealt with the topic of McCarthyism and those who thought it a superficial gloss instead of a pithy statement about the McCarthy era. In 1976, reviewing it for The New York Times, Vincent Canby acknowledged the film's lack of direct political commentary: "The Front is not the whole story of an especially unpleasant piece of American history. It may be faulted for oversimplification. Mr. Ritt and Mr. Bernstein, veterans of the blacklist, are not interested in subtleties. Yet, even in its comic moments, The Front works on the conscience. "It recreates the awful noise of ignorance that can still be heard."

Pauline Kael wrote in praise of the film and the performance of Woody Allen in particular: "At its most appealing, this movie says that people shouldn't be pressured to inform on their friends, that people shouldn't be humiliated in order to earn a living. Humbly, this film asks for fairness... When you see Woody Allen in one of his own films, in a peculiar way you take him for granted; here you appreciate his skill, because you miss him so much when he's offscreen."

Roger Ebert dismissed the political value of The Front: "What we get are the adventures of a schlemiel in wonderland". He felt that the Woody Allen character was too comic and unconvincing a writer to represent the true nature of "front" writers. He added that Hecky Brown was a worthwhile character: "The tragedy implied by this character tells us what we need to know about the blacklist's effect on people's lives; the rest of the movie adds almost nothing else".

As of June 2026, The Front holds a rating of 67% on Rotten Tomatoes from 27 reviews.

=== Accolades ===
For The Front, Walter Bernstein was nominated for the 1977 Academy Award for Writing Original Screenplay and Zero Mostel was nominated for a BAFTA Award for Best Supporting Actor. Andrea Marcovicci was nominated for the 1977 "Golden Globe Award for New Star of the Year – Actress".

== Historical basis ==
The movie draws from real incidents in its depiction of the characters. A scene in which Hecky (played by Mostel) goes to entertain at a mountain resort, and then is cheated out of part of his fee, is based on an incident described by Bernstein in his memoirs Inside Out: A Memoir of the Blacklist. In the book, Bernstein describes how Mostel came to entertain at the Concord Hotel in the Catskills, where he used to entertain as a rising comic because he desperately needed the money. The manager of the Concord promised him $500, but when he arrived, reduced that to $250, according to Bernstein. In the movie, Hecky has a violent scene when, after the performance, he learns he has been cheated. In real life, Mostel was told before the performance and acted out his hostility during the performance by cursing at the customers, who thought it was part of the act.

Hecky Brown, and his suicide, was based on blacklisted actor Philip Loeb, a friend of Mostel who was investigated by HUAC and fired from his leading role in the television series The Goldbergs in 1951. He died by suicide in 1955. Mostel was motivated to participate in the project because he wanted to educate future generations of Americans. As he pointed out in his biography by Jared Brown, "It's part of this country, and a lot of kids don't even realize that blacklisting ever existed." An informal collective of the blacklisted writers Bernstein, Arnold Manoff, and Abraham Polonsky is portrayed in an early scene in which the Murphy character, modeled on Bernstein, introduces the Allen character to two other blacklisted writers.

== Musical adaptation ==
In 2008, a musical adaptation of The Front had a workshop in New York City. The musical, also titled The Front (or, alternatively, Lucky Break) had music and lyrics by Paul Gordon and Jay Gruska, with a book and additional lyrics by Seth Friedman, and its workshop was co-directed by John Caird and Nell Balaban, starring Brian d'Arcy James as Howard Prince, Richard Kind as Hecky Brown, and Jayne Paterson as Florence Barrett.

== See also ==
- List of American films of 1976
