= Arnold Manoff =

American screenwriter (1914–1965)

- Born: Arnold Pismenoff; April 25, 1914; New York City, U.S.
- Died: February 10, 1965 (aged 50); New York City, U.S.
- Other name: Joel Carpenter
- Occupations: Screenwriter, novelist, playwright
- Years active: 1942–1965
- Spouse(s): Irene Dworkin (m. 1933, divorced) Ruth Steinberg (m. 1939, divorced) Marjorie Jean McGregor (m. 1944, divorced) Lee Grant (m. 1952, divorced)
- Children: 4, including Dinah Manoff

Arnold Manoff (born Pismenoff; April 25, 1914 – February 10, 1965) was an American screenwriter and novelist who was blacklisted from working in film and television in the 1950s. To survive he sold scripts either using a "front", or the pseudonym "Joel Carpenter", up until his death. Manoff's experiences while blacklisted were among the inspirations for the 1976 film The Front.

== Early life ==
Manoff was born Arnold Pismenoff in Manhattan in 1914, the only son of Lithuanian Jewish immigrants Boris Pismenoff and Gussie Simon. They had married in Ohio in 1909. His father worked as a paper hanger and later a grocer. The family name was changed to Manoff in the 1920s. Manoff quit school at age 15 and did not attend college.

== Career ==
=== Initial writing ===
Manoff began writing and won a contest in Story magazine. In the 1930s he compiled games and songs of the streets of New York City for the Works Progress Administration's Federal Writers' Project.

His first novel, Telegram From Heaven, was published by Dial Press in 1942. The book recounts the struggles of an unemployed stenographer, narrated from her viewpoint. The New York Times review said that Manoff "has written a readable book, pulsing with life," and that he "knows the life of the submerged poor and he has an intimate sympathy for them."

=== Films and theater ===
Manoff's first screenplay became the 1944 film Man from Frisco. He then saw three more of his screenplays made into movies: My Buddy (1944), Casbah (1948, starring Tony Martin, Peter Lorre and Yvonne De Carlo), and No Minor Vices (1948, starring Dana Andrews, Lilli Palmer, and Louis Jordan). Manoff also contributed to Richard Maibaum's screenplay for Song of Surrender (1949).

Despite these few successes, Manoff was dissatisfied during his years as a contract writer for Paramount Studios. In a 1997 interview, Abraham Polonsky told an anecdote about visiting Manoff at his Paramount office in Hollywood in the late 1940s. Manoff confided that he was frustrated because many of his best scripts were not accepted by the studio and turned into films: "Abe, I'm going back to New York. I can't stand this. They never make anything I like."

Manoff returned to New York where his novella All You Need is One Good Break, which had been published in Story, was being produced on Broadway in 1950. The play starred John Berry and J. Edward Bromberg, and was co-directed by them. The show's reviews were described by cast member Lee Grant as "scathing". New York Times theater critic Brooks Atkinson called it "a tabloid tale about a tenement wastrel" and said it was "maudlin when it was not commonplace." The Brooklyn Daily Eagle also panned the play, labeling it "a tiresome, rather whiny business", but praised the performance of supporting actress Lee Grant, who had left the hit play Detective Story to join the cast. All You Need is One Good Break closed after four performances; it was briefly revived later that year.

=== Blacklisting ===
In April 1951, director Edward Dmytryk testified before the House Un-American Activities Committee (HUAC) and named Manoff, among 25 other film industry workers, as a member of the Communist Party who allegedly advocated the overthrow of U.S. Government. In September 1951, Manoff was named as a Communist to the HUAC by five additional "friendly" witnesses, including screenwriters Martin Berkeley and Leo Townsend. As a result, Manoff found himself blacklisted.

Lee Grant, who married Manoff in 1952, was also blacklisted after she gave an impassioned eulogy at the memorial service for blacklisted actor J. Edward Bromberg, and she was listed in the Red Channels publication. In a 2014 interview, Grant admitted she knew nothing about Communism and said, "it was one of the big rifts between my husband [Manoff] and myself. He was a Communist. And I didn't have the base for that kind of philosophy. I just couldn't understand it."

While blacklisted, Manoff met regularly in a New York City restaurant with fellow Jewish writers and blacklistees Walter Bernstein and Abraham Polonsky. The three of them formed "a kind of collective to help each other survive by writing under the table" for television, mainly for the dramatic anthology series Danger and the historical series You Are There. As Bernstein recalled,

It was Manoff who realized that our threesome needed rules so far as work was concerned. The rules he suggested made immediate sense to Polonsky and me. They were simple. If one of us found work, that work belonged to him. He kept any money coming from that work.... On the other hand, if he desired help with his script, the others were obligated to help. If anyone had the good luck to get more than one assignment, he was free to keep the extra work for himself. He could also bring that extra work to the group and we would decide on the basis of need who was to take that job. It would then be presented to the producer as the work of the one who got the assignment.

The success of the plan depended on finding "fronts" who would pose as the screenwriter in meetings with the show's producer. One of Manoff's first fronts was an actress acquaintance. She sold a Manoff-written script for the Danger series. Bernstein noted, "A television critic called the show an especially fine example of what the new breed of women writers could do."

=== Later career ===
Unlike Bernstein and Polonsky, Manoff did not live long enough to see his real name appear again on a screen credit. In the early 1960s, he continued to write under the Joel Carpenter pseudonym for episodes of Naked City, Route 66, and The Defenders.

At the time of his death in February 1965, Manoff was adapting for film a Bernard Malamud story that was to star Harry Belafonte. Walter Grauman, who directed a Naked City episode written by Manoff, said years later that he was shocked to learn that his real name was not Carpenter, and only discovered the fact by accident. He called Manoff a "terrific writer."

== Legacy ==
Walter Bernstein described Manoff as "a talent that never really flourished." Author Erik Christiansen said that of the blacklistees who wrote scripts for the You Are There series, Manoff's personal story was the saddest because of his difficulty escaping the blacklist.

The informal writers collective of Manoff, Bernstein, and Polonsky was dramatized in the Bernstein-written film The Front (1976). In an early scene in a New York City restaurant, the Michael Murphy character (modeled on Bernstein) introduces the Woody Allen character to two other blacklisted screenwriter friends.

== Personal life ==
In her 2014 memoir I Said Yes to Everything, Lee Grant wrote that Manoff was known as "the silver fox" when she first met him in 1950 during rehearsals for All You Need is One Good Break, because of his grayish-white hair that made him look older than his 36 years. He'd already been married three times and had a nine-year-old daughter with his second wife, Ruth. In 1950 he was still married to Marjorie Jean, the mother of his two sons, Tom and Michael. Grant recounted that she and Manoff were "an item" during production of the play.

Grant wrote that she was living at home before their marriage, and that her parents did not approve of him. She added, there was a "Pygmalion" aspect to their marriage, in the way he sought to instruct her on Soviet literature and politics. She claimed that he had little interest in her upbringing, and she never met most of his family members, including his mother. Grant and Manoff were divorced at the time of his death. They had a daughter, Dinah Manoff, who became an actress.

In his memoir, Walter Bernstein wrote of his friend:

Manoff was a handsome man with prematurely gray hair and large liquid brown eyes of the kind that used to be called bedroom eyes. Women liked him; men were not so sure. He had the air of a licentious rabbi. His manner was slow and deliberate, but he had an uncanny perception of people and an often disconcerting ability to see what others didn't. An argument would come to a satisfying end and then he would say something that would make you realize there was another, deeper layer to the discussion. It was a gift, like extrasharp eyesight, but it did not necessarily endear him to people.

== Death ==
On February 10, 1965, Manoff died of a heart ailment at Roosevelt Hospital in New York City. He was 50 years old. He was survived by two daughters, two sons, two sisters, and his mother.
