= Sarah Crichton =

American publisher, editor and writer

Sarah Crichton is an American writer, editor and publisher, who serves as editor-at-large at Henry Holt and Company since 2023, having previously served as its editor-in-chief from 2020 to 2023. She previously served as publisher at Little, Brown & Company from 1996 to 2001, and as publisher of her eponymous imprint, Sarah Crichton Books, at Farrar, Straus & Giroux from 2004 till 2019.

== Family ==
Sarah Crichton is the daughter of novelist Robert Crichton and documentary producer Judy Crichton. Her grandfather was the writer and editor Kyle Crichton. Sarah Crichton grew up in New York City where she attended The Dalton School. She graduated from Harvard College where she wrote for The Harvard Crimson.

== Career ==
After college, Crichton became a freelance writer and then an articles editor at Seventeen where she was named editor in 1987. Crichton then became arts editor at Newsweek in 1988, and later was named a managing editor there.

Crichton left Newsweek in 1996 to become publisher of the Adult Trade unit at Little, Brown & Company. She was the first woman in that position in the history of the publishing house. Among the books Crichton published at Little, Brown are Malcolm Gladwell's The Tipping Point and George Stephanopoulos's All Too Human. Crichton left Little, Brown & Company in January 2001.

Crichton then served as a freelance editor for Madeleine Albright's memoir, Madam Secretary: A Memoir which was published in 2003.

Following her work on the Albright memoir, Sarah Crichton co-wrote Daniel Liebeskind's memoir, Breaking Ground, published in 2004, and worked with Joe Lieberman and Hadassah Lieberman on their memoir of the 2000 presidential campaign, An Amazing Adventure.

Crichton co-wrote the bestselling A Mighty Heart with Mariane Pearl about the murder of Pearl's husband, journalist Daniel Pearl, and Pearl's attempt to discover who was behind his assassination.

In June 2004, Farrar, Straus & Giroux announced that Crichton would become head of Sarah Crichton Books, an imprint at the publishing house. Sarah Crichton Books published authors such as Cathleen Schine, David Finkel, Matthew Quick, John Leland, Brigid Schulte, and Ishmael Beah whose memoir of his life as a child soldier in Sierra Leone, A Long Way Gone: Memoirs of a Boy Soldier, became an international bestseller.

In 2016, Crichton contributed an essay to the anthology The Bitch is Back which The New York Times described as "a tour de force of comedy and poignancy" about "the travails of dating again at almost 60."

Crichton left Farrar, Straus & Giroux in December 2019 and was appointed editor-in-chief of adult trade books at Henry Holt and Company in April 2020. Crichton stepped down from the editor-in-chief position in 2023 to serve as editor-at-large at Holt, continuing to work with authors such as Cathleen Schine and Michael Wolff.
