= Andrew Bernstein (director) =

American television director and producer

- Born: New York, NY
- Education: Bowdoin College
- Occupations: Television director, television producer
- Years active: 1989–present
- Spouse: Jennifer Barrett
- Parent(s): Judith Braun Bernstein; Walter Bernstein

Andrew Bernstein is an American television director and producer.

== Biography ==
Bernstein is the son of actress Judith Braun and Walter Bernstein, an Academy Award-nominated screenwriter. His brother is journalist Jake Bernstein.

In 2002, he directed his first film, the short Rooftop Kisses, starring Allison Janney, Maura Tierney, and Anton Yelchin.

Prior to working in television, Bernstein worked as an assistant director on the films Little Big League (1994), 12 Monkeys (1995), Eraser (1996) and Batman & Robin (1997). He has since directed episodes of House, Mad Men, Studio 60 on the Sunset Strip, The West Wing, ER, Criminal Minds: Suspect Behaviour, Mercy, Psych, Covert Affairs and The Americans, Elementary, Low Winter Sun, Tyrant, Baz Luhrmann's Netflix series The Get Down, and Ozark. He also has served as a producer and executive producer on Mercy, Criminal Minds: Suspect Behaviour, Pan Am, House, Battle Creek, Fear the Walking Dead, and The Outsider.

Bernstein has two daughters, Lili and Emma Bernstein, and resides in Los Angeles with his wife, Jennifer Barrett.
