= Joseph Opatoshu =

Polish-born Yiddish writer (1886 – 1954)

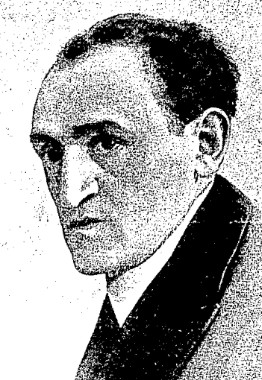
- Born: Yosef Meir Opatowski; December 24, 1886; Mława, Congress Poland
- Died: October 7, 1954 (aged 68); New York City, United States
- Occupations: Writer, novelist
- Children: David Opatoshu
- Relatives: Danny Opatoshu (grandson)
- Writing career
- Genre: Fiction

Joseph Opatoshu (Yiddish: יוסף אָפּאַטאָשו; December 24, 1886 – October 7, 1954) was a Polish-born Yiddish novelist and short story writer. He was the father of actor David Opatoshu.

== Biography ==
Opatoshu was born in 1886 as Yosef Meir Opatowski to Jewish parents, Dawid (or Dovid) and Nantshe, near Mława, Congress Poland.

His father, a wood merchant, came from a Hasidic family and had become a Maskil. He sent Yosef to the best Polish schools in the country. At the age of 19 Yosef went to study engineering in Nancy, France.

However, privation sent him to the United States in 1907, where he settled in New York City, where his name became Joseph Opatovsky, and he later took the professional name of Joseph Opatoshu.

== Works ==
=== Selected novels ===
- 1914 From the New York Ghetto
- 1914 Di naye heym
- 1918 Alone: Romance of a Forest Girl
- 1921 In Polish Woods
- אין פּוילישע וועלדער, 1921; translated to English from the Yiddish by Isaac Goldberg: In Polish Woods, The Jewish Publication Society of America, 1938
- ראָמאַן פֿון א פֿערד־גנבֿ ,1917; A roman fun a ferd ganev (Romance of a Horsethief)
- The Last Revolt, the story of Rabbi Akiba; translated from the Yiddish by Moshe Spiegel, The Jewish Publication Society of America, 1952
- אַ טאָג אין רעגענסבורג, Di Goldene Pave Paris 1955; translated to English from the Yiddish by Jacob Sloan: A Day in Regensburg; short stories, The Jewish Publication Society of America, 1968
- The Dancer
- A Day in Regensburg, a writing about Jewish German life in the 16th-century
- Bar-Kokhba (1953), a Hebrew novel

=== Film adaptation ===
- A film based on Romance of a Horsethief was released in 1971. His son, David Opatoshu, wrote the screenplay and it was directed by Abraham Polonsky. The cast includes Yul Brynner as Captain Stoloff, Eli Wallach as Kifke, Jane Birkin as Naomi, and his son, David, as Schloime Kradnik.
