= David Opatoshu =

American actor (1918–1996)

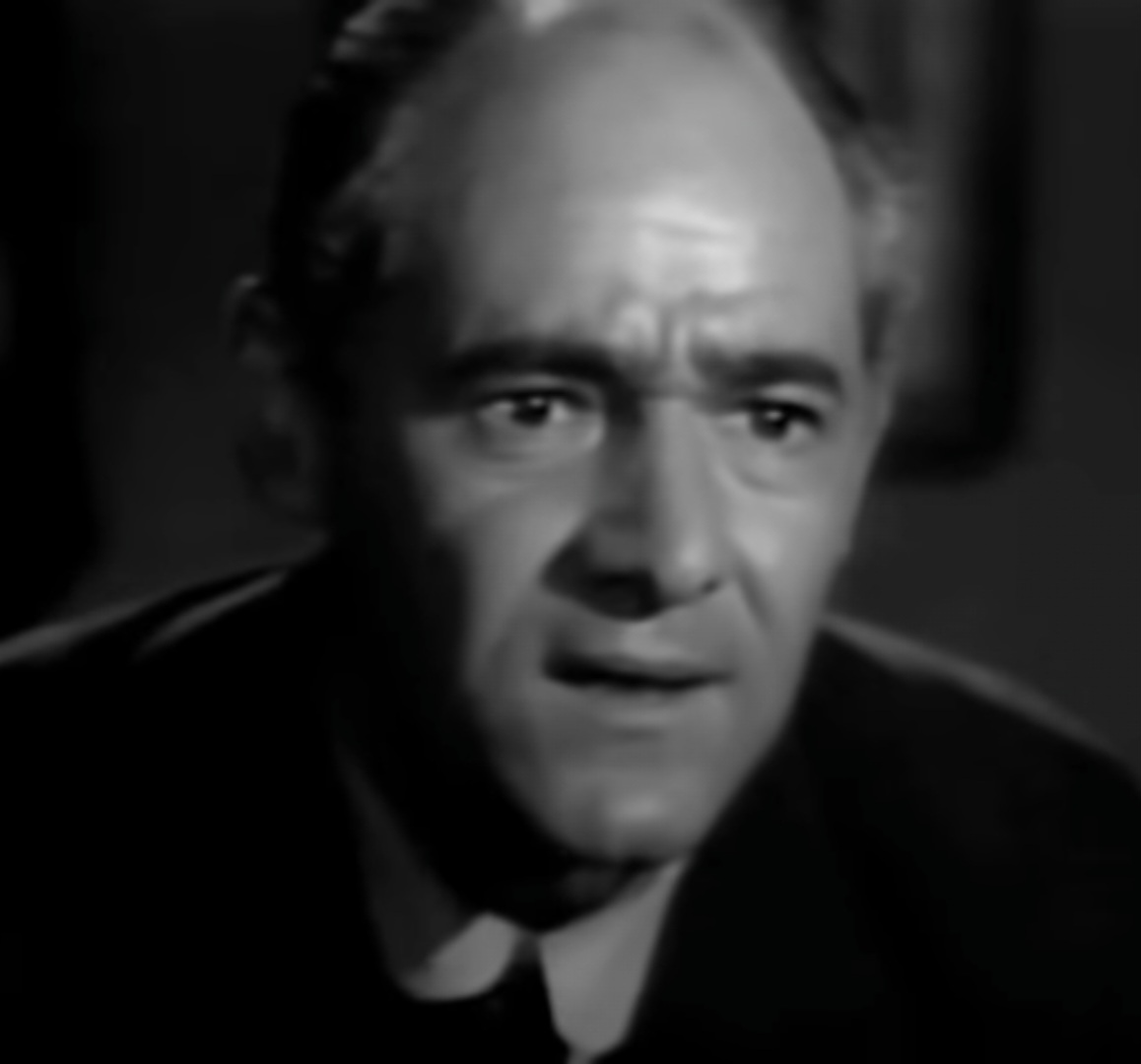
- Opatoshu in the TV series One Step Beyond, episode Earthquake, 1960
- Born: David Opatovsky; January 30, 1918; New York City, New York, U.S.
- Died: April 30, 1996 (aged 78); Los Angeles, California, U.S.
- Other name: David Opatashu
- Occupation: Actor
- Years active: 1936–1996
- Spouse: Lillian Weinberg (m. 1941)
- Children: 1
- Father: Joseph Opatoshu

David Opatoshu (born David Opatovsky; January 30, 1918 – April 30, 1996) was an American actor and writer. He appeared in over 150 film, television, and stage productions from the late 1930s through the early 1990s.

== Early life ==
Opatoshu was born to Jewish parents in New York City in 1918. His father, Joseph Opatoshu, was a Polish-born writer of Yiddish literature. As a young man, Opatoshu began his stage acting career in the Yiddish theater.

== Career ==
Following his tenure in the role of "Mr. Carp" in the 1938 national tour of the play Golden Boy, he made his Broadway debut in 1940 in the play Night Music. His first film, The Light Ahead (1939), directed by Henry Felt and Edgar G. Ulmer, is notable for being entirely in Yiddish.

After serving with the Army Air Forces in the South Pacific during World War II, Opatoshu returned to Manhattan and worked in radio, theater, television and films. His wartime experiences provided the material for Between Sea and Sand, a collection of short stories he published in Yiddish in 1946.

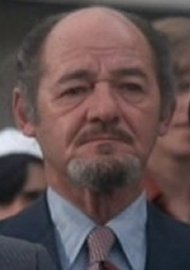
David Opatoshu in Raid on Entebbe

Opatoshu appeared as the homicide detective, Sgt. Ben Miller, in Jules Dassin's film noir, The Naked City (1948) produced by Mark Hellinger. He had a small uncredited role in Dassin's Thieves Highway. In 1953 he appeared in Henri Verneuil's Public Enemy Number One.

In 1958, he played a supporting character in The Brothers Karamazov with his future Star Trek co-star William Shatner. He played the Irgun leader (and Ari Ben Canaan's estranged uncle), a fictional character based on Menachem Begin's role in the Irgun, in Otto Preminger's 1960 film Exodus. He played the father of Benny Rampell in 1963's The Cardinal uncredited.

In 1965, he played the supervillain in Tarzan and the Valley of Gold, then portrayed Herr Jacobi, one of the people who help Paul Newman and Julie Andrews escape from East Germany in Alfred Hitchcock's 1966 film Torn Curtain.

In 1967, Opatoshu played Morris Kolowitz, the father of the main character David (Reni Santoni), in Carl Reiner's directorial debut Enter Laughing. In the 1977 film, Raid on Entebbe (based on the actual Operation Entebbe and the freeing of hostages at Entebbe Airport in Entebbe, Uganda on July 4, 1976), he played the part of Menachem Begin.

=== Television ===
His career in television began in 1949 and lasted through the 1980s.

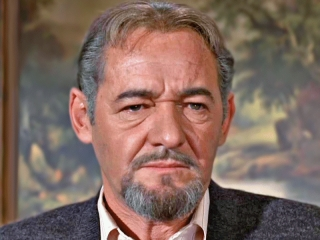
Opatoshu in the 1969 Mannix episode "A Pittance of Faith", as Mr. Lardelli.

In 1963, he co-starred with James Doohan in an episode of The Twilight Zone titled "Valley of the Shadow". He guest-starred in the 1964 The Outer Limits episode "A Feasibility Study"; in the 1965 Voyage to the Bottom of the Sea episode "The Price of Doom"; and in the 1965 two-part episode of The Man from U.N.C.L.E. called "The Alexander the Greater Affair".

In 1967, he played Anan 7 in the original Star Trek series episode "A Taste of Armageddon". In 1969, he figured in a Hawaii Five-O episode "Face of the Dragon", and also in the 1969 season 3 Ironside episode "L'Chayim", and in Mannix, in the episode "A Pittance of Faith", as Mr. Lardelli, in the same year.

Opatoshu played in a 1970 episode of Daniel Boone as "Tamenund", an aged Pequot Indian bent on revenge for his tribe's near-extinction. He was also in the "No Way to Treat a Relative" episode of the 1973 situation comedy Needles and Pins (never broadcast because of the show's cancellation), the Kojak episode "Both Sides of the Law", the 1977 The Bionic Woman episode "Doomsday Is Tomorrow", the 1978 Little House on the Prairie episode "I'll Be Waving as You Drive Away", the 1981 Buck Rogers in the 25th Century episode "Time of the Hawk", and the 1981 miniseries Masada. In 1986 he played an Iranian ambassador in the TV thriller Under Siege, about Islamic terrorist attacks in the United States.

On October 30, 1989, Opatashu guest-starred as the Tenctonese ex-slave Paul Revere in the episode "Night of the Screams", of the television series Alien Nation.

In 1991, he won an Emmy Award for his guest appearance in the episode "A Prayer for the Goldsteins" of the ABC series Gabriel's Fire.

=== Broadway ===
Opatoshu appeared on Broadway in Silk Stockings (1956), Once More, With Feeling (1958), The Wall (1960), Bravo Giovanni (1962), Lorenzo (1963), and Does a Tiger Wear a Necktie? (1969).

=== Screenwriter ===
David Opatoshu also wrote the screenplay for the film Romance of a Horsethief (1971), based on a novel by his father Joseph.

== Personal life ==
Opatoshu married Lillian Weinberg (died 2000), a psychiatric social worker, on June 10, 1941. They had one child together, screenwriter Danny Opatoshu.

=== Death ===
Opatoshu died in Los Angeles on April 20, 1996, at the age of 78.

== Filmography ==
=== Film ===
- The Light Ahead (1939) — Fishke
- The Naked City (1948) — Sergeant Dave Miller (uncredited)
- Illegal Entry (1949) — Al (uncredited)
- Any Number Can Play (1949) — Bartender (uncredited)
- Thieves' Highway (1949) — Frenchy — Thug in Cap (uncredited)
- The Goldbergs (1950) — Mr. Dutton
- The Most Wanted Man (1953) — Slim le Tueur
- Crowded Paradise (1956)
- The Brothers Karamazov (1958) — Captain Snegiryov
- Where Is Thy Brother? (1958, TV movie) — Father
- Party Girl (1958) — Lou Forbes
- Cimarron (1960) — Sol Levy
- Exodus (1960) — Akiva Ben Canaan
- Black City (1961) — Il Commissario Natalucci
- The Best of Enemies (1961) — Italian Physician Bernasconi
- Guns of Darkness (1962) — President Rivera
- The Cardinal (1963) — Mr. Rampell (uncredited)
- Sands of Beersheba (1964) — Daoud
- One Spy Too Many (1966) — Mr. Kavon
- Tarzan and the Valley of Gold (1966) — Augustus Vinero
- Torn Curtain (1966) — Mr. Jacobi
- The Defector (1966) — Orlovsky
- Enter Laughing (1967) — Mr. Morris Kolowitz
- Ha-Dybbuk (1968) — Zadik
- The Fixer (1968) — Latke
- The Smugglers (1968, TV movie) — Alfredo Faggio
- Death of a Gunfighter (1969) — Edward Rosenbloom
- The D.A.: Murder One (1969, TV movie) — Dr. Rudolph Grainger
- A Walk in the Spring Rain (1970) — (uncredited)
- Incident in San Francisco (1971, TV movie) — Herschel Roman
- Romance of a Horsethief (1971) — Schloime Kradnik
- Portrait: A Man Whose Name Was John (1973, TV movie) — Rabbi Isaac Herzog
- Conspiracy of Terror (1975, TV movie) — Arthur Horowitz
- Francis Gary Powers: The True Story of the U-2 Spy Incident (1976, TV movie) — Grinev
- Raid on Entebbe (1976, TV movie) — Menachem Begin
- Woman on the Run (1977, TV movie) — Ed Mills
- Ziegfeld: The Man and His Women (1978, TV movie) — Flo's Father
- Who'll Stop the Rain (1978) — Bender
- In Search of Historic Jesus (1979, Documentary) — Herod
- Americathon (1979) — Abdul Muhammad
- Beyond Evil (1980) — Dr. Solomon
- Flash Gordon: The Greatest Adventure of All (1982, TV movie) — Vultan (voice)
- Forced Vengeance (1982) — Sam Paschal
- Forty Days of Musa Dagh (1982) — Henry Morgenthau, Sr.
- Under Siege (1986, TV movie) — Ambassador Sajid Moktasanni
- Conspiracy: The Trial of the Chicago 8 (1987, TV movie) — Judge Julius Hoffman

=== Television ===
- Alfred Hitchcock Presents (1958) (Season 3 Episode 20: "On the Nose") as Mr. Cooney
- The Walter Winchell File (1958) (Season 1 Episode 23: "The Silent City") — Triple "A"
- Decision (1958) (Season 1 Episode 12: "Man Against Crime") as Sam Mischner
- One Step Beyond (1960) (Season 2 Episode 17: "Earthquake") — Gerald Perkins
- Alfred Hitchcock Presents (1962) (Season 7 Episode 19: "Strange Miracle") as Pedro Siqueras
- The Outer Limits (1964) (Season 1 Episode 29: "A Feasibility Study") — Ralph Cashman
- The Alfred Hitchcock Hour (1964) (Season 2 Episode 13: "The Magic Shop") as Mr. Dulong
- Dr. Kildare (1965) (six episodes) — Fred Kirsh
  - (Season 5 Episode 13: "The Life Machine")
  - (Season 5 Episode 14: "Toast the Golden Couple")
  - (Season 5 Episode 15: "Wives and Losers")
  - (Season 5 Episode 17: "A Little Child Shall Lead")
  - (Season 5 Episode 18: "Hour of Decision")
  - (Season 5 Episode 19: "Aftermath")
- Perry Mason (1965) (Season 8 Episode 19: "The Case of the Feather Cloak") — Gustave Heller
- McHale's Navy (1966) (Season 4 Episode 29: "Binghamton, at 20 Paces") — Count Cesare Spinetti
- The Time Tunnel (1966) (Season 1 Episode 10: "Reign Of Terror") — Shopkeeper
- Mission: Impossible (1967) (Season 1 Episode 18: "The Trial") – Deputy Premiere Anton Kudnov
- Star Trek: The Original Series (1967) (Season 1 Episode 23: "A Taste of Armageddon") – Anan 7 (First Councilman of the High Council of Eminiar VII)
- Mission: Impossible (1969) (Season 4 Episode 5: "Fool's Gold") – Premier Roshkoff
- Mission: Impossible (1970) (Season 4 Episode 20: "Terror") – Ahmed Vassier
- The Streets of San Francisco (1972) (Season 1 Episode 1: "The Thirty-Year Pin") — Joseph Beemer, Jeweler
- Needles and Pins (1974) (Season 1 Episode 12: "No Way to Treat a Relative") — Leo (never aired)
- Little House on the Prairie (1978) (Season 4 Episode 22: "I'll Be Waving as You Drive Away: Part 2") — Taylor Nash
- Buck Rogers in the 25th Century (1981) (Season 2 Episode 1: "Time of the Hawk") — Llamajuna
- Masada (1981 miniseries) (4 episodes: Part I, Part II, Part III, Part IV) — Shimon
