= Abraham Polonsky =

American screenwriter and film director (1910–1999)

- Born: Abraham Lincoln Polonsky; December 5, 1910; New York City, New York, U.S.
- Died: October 26, 1999 (aged 88); Beverly Hills, California, U.S.
- Occupations: Film director; screenwriter; essayist; novelist
- Known for: Body and Soul (1947); Force of Evil (1948)
- Spouse: Sylvia Marrow (m. 1937)
- Children: 2: Susan Polonsky Epstein and Henry Polonsky

Abraham Lincoln Polonsky (December 5, 1910 – October 26, 1999) was an American film director, screenwriter, essayist and novelist. He was nominated for an Academy Award for Best Original Screenplay for Body and Soul (1947). The following year, he wrote and directed Force of Evil (1948), which was later hailed by Martin Scorsese and others as one of the finest achievements of American film noir. However, it was to be Polonsky's last credited film for more than twenty years. In April 1951, he refused to cooperate or "name names" to the House Un-American Activities Committee and was blacklisted by the movie studios.

== Early life ==
Abraham Polonsky was born in New York City, the eldest son of Russian Jewish immigrants, Henry and Rebecca (née Rosoff). Polonsky would later say, "I'm the son of a pharmacist, il dottore, from a Sicilian neighborhood on the East Side where we lived after the Bronx." He attended DeWitt Clinton High School with classmates that included future film composer Bernard Herrmann.

In 1928, he entered City College of New York (CCNY). While there, he became entranced with the writings of Marcel Proust. Polonsky's initial literary efforts show the influence of the French author. Among Polonsky's close college friends were Paul Goodman and Leonard Boudin. After graduating, Polonsky earned his law degree in 1935 at Columbia Law School. He had paid his way by teaching night classes at CCNY in English literature and writing. A committed Marxist, Polonsky joined the Communist Party USA (CPUSA) in 1936. The following year he married his longtime sweetheart, Sylvia Marrow. They had two children.

== Career ==
=== Lawyer and writer ===
As a young lawyer, Polonsky participated in union politics and also established and edited a left-wing newspaper, The Home Front, for the CIO. After a few years of law practice, mixed with teaching at CCNY, he decided to devote himself to writing. He wrote essays, radio scripts, novels and an occasional play. His first novel, The Goose is Cooked, written with Mitchell A. Wilson under the singular pseudonym of Emmett Hogarth, was published in 1940. His next novel, The Enemy Sea (1943), was serialized in Collier's magazine and was noticed by Paramount Pictures.

=== World War II ===
Meanwhile, the U.S. had entered World War II, and Polonsky wanted to enlist. However, as "a man over thirty with thick glasses", he had difficulty getting accepted by any military branch. Finally, based on a tip from his brother, he joined the Office of Strategic Services (OSS) (forerunner of the CIA). Shortly before being sent overseas, he signed a five-year contract with Paramount, starting at $250 a week. Because his family needed the money, he asked General "Wild Bill" Donovan of the OSS how he could keep the Paramount job. Donovan said, "[G]reat, it'll make a good cover story. So he gave me a letter instructing Paramount to say I'd been hired to do a documentary on the bombing of England."

Polonsky served in Europe with the OSS from 1943 to 1945, mainly working as a liaison with the French Resistance, and sometimes operating behind enemy lines. He wrote and directed radio programs on clandestine OSS stations. His programs intermixed American jazz, which German soldiers tuned in to, with U.S.-supplied information. Polonsky recalled: "When a German sub went down the Germans never admitted it. But we knew who was on the sub, who went down, his name, address, and all the rest. We broadcast all that to their families as they listened to the jazz. A lot of people listened." Among his other OSS assignments was interviewing Nazi defector Rudolf Hess, and participating in the D-Day landing while posing in his intelligence capacity as an army major.

=== Filmmaker and essayist ===
Polonsky returned to the movie industry after the war. He helped launch the academic film journal Hollywood Quarterly (now titled Film Quarterly), and contributed several essays. His first screenplay credit for Paramount Pictures was Golden Earrings (1947), directed by Mitchell Leisen. His next project would change the trajectory of his career. He was loaned out by Paramount to Enterprise Studios to write a boxing story for John Garfield. Polonsky's original screenplay for the Robert Rossen-directed Body and Soul (1947), also starring Lilli Palmer, became an enormous critical and box-office success. The screenplay was nominated for an Academy Award. Body and Soul gave Polonsky leverage to direct his own film. As he recalled in a 1997 interview, "there's nothing like having a hit."

For his initial directorial effort, Polonsky chose to adapt Ira Wolfert's 1943 novel, Tucker's People. The story centers on a moral conflict between two brothers: one is a crooked lawyer who has grown rich in the numbers racket, and the other is a struggling small-time operator who still wants to maintain his integrity and decency. Unlike Body and Soul, Force of Evil was not a commercial success when released in the U.S. But after a while it came to be praised by film critics in France and England, and since then its reputation has continued to soar. It is now recognized as a high point of American film noir. Andrew Sarris would later call Force of Evil "one of the great films of modern American cinema." Polonsky's biographers noted that when Martin Scorsese sponsored the re-release of the movie on videotape in 1996, he introduced it on-screen as "the gem of neglected 1940s art cinema and a major influence on his own work." In 1994, Force of Evil was selected for preservation in the National Film Registry by the Library of Congress for being "culturally, historically or aesthetically significant".

=== Hollywood blacklist ===
Polonsky's career as a director and a credited screenwriter was abruptly halted when the Second Red Scare gripped the film industry. In April 1951, he was named as a Communist to the House Un-American Activities Committee (HUAC) by Richard J. Collins, Sterling Hayden, and Meta Rosenberg. Later that month, on April 25, 1951, Polonsky was summoned before the committee. He refused to answer questions, instead invoking the Fifth Amendment's shield against self-incrimination. He also refused to answer whether his wife Sylvia had been a CPUSA member.

Only once during his testimony did Polonsky offer a response. He was asked for the names of the men he worked with in the OSS. He replied, "It's none of your business." Before he could be pressed to answer a follow-up question about whether he signed an OSS loyalty oath, a dark-suited man hurried up to the dais and whispered in HUAC Chairman John Wood's ear. Polonsky later said, "He told them to stop right away. The guy in the suit was an intelligence operative, and even he knew I shouldn't answer that question. All those guys I'd been with in the OSS were now in the CIA." At that point in the proceedings, Congressman Harold Velde (R-IL) recognized that Polonsky possessed a unique set of qualities: successful Hollywood filmmaker, suspected Communist, and former intelligence agent. Velde stated, "in refusing to answer whether or not you signed a loyalty oath when you went into the OSS, you leave me with the impression that you are a very dangerous citizen." The "very dangerous citizen" label instantly became a headline in The Hollywood Reporter and ensured Polonsky would be blacklisted. The phrase was later used as the title of a Polonsky biography.

From 1953 to 1955, Polonsky wrote 24 episodes (including the premiere episode, "The Landing of the Hindenburg", directed by Sidney Lumet) of the popular TV series, You Are There. Hosted by Walter Cronkite, the 30-minute educational show reenacted famous days in history. Polonsky crafted the tag line that Cronkite closed with: "What kind of a day was it? A day like all days, filled with those events that alter and illuminate our time...and YOU WERE THERE!" Polonsky's work was uncredited, as was the work of his frequent writing partners and fellow blacklistees, Walter Bernstein and Arnold Manoff. The three blacklisted writers met regularly in a New York City restaurant to discuss, and offer assistance with, the scripts they were working on. Their ability to still sell scripts while blacklisted relied on finding "fronts" – individuals who would agree to put their name on the blacklistee's script and pose as the screenwriter in conferences with the show's producer. The restaurant meetings between Bernstein, Manoff, and Polonsky were later dramatized by Bernstein in the 1976 film, The Front. In 1955, William Dozier, executive producer of You Are There, informed the network of the true identities of the three writers and they were immediately fired.

In the ensuing years, Polonsky continued to write scripts using fronts and pseudonyms. It is known that he, along with Nelson Gidding, co-wrote the screenplay for Odds Against Tomorrow (1959), based on a novel of the same name by William McGivern. It was initially credited to John O. Killens, who acted as the front. Polonsky was not given public credit for the screenplay until 1997, when the Writers Guild of America West officially restored his name to the film under the WGA screenwriting credit system.

=== Novelist ===
Through the ups and downs of his film and television career, Polonsky pursued aspirations as a novelist. He published five novels over the course of 40 years. After his early efforts The Goose Is Cooked (1940) and The Enemy Sea (1943), he wrote his most ambitious novel, and personal favorite, The World Above in 1951. Adhering somewhat to the Bildungsroman convention, the book covers the formative years and maturation of Dr. Carl Meyers, a Freudian-trained psychiatrist who seeks to add scientific rigor to the field of psychology and, in his struggles to do so, becomes a politically radical thinker. The World Above garnered a few favorable reviews at the time, but was generally ignored until it received a second look in 1999, when the University of Illinois Press reissued it as part of "The Radical Novel Reconsidered" series.

Polonsky's next novel was A Season of Fear (1956), which attempted "to make psychological sense out of the phenomenon of the Friendly Witness, the erstwhile friend and collaborator who testifies for the government against his own past and against the futures of those who made his success possible." His last published work of fiction was Zenia's Way (1980). It was his most autobiographical novel about a boy growing up in 1920s Bronx in the thrall of his courageous Aunt Zenia (Polonsky's boyhood was also influenced by a much-beloved aunt). They meet up again in Israel after many decades.

== Later years ==
As the blacklist eased in the mid-1960s, Polonsky began to get credited work again. He was the creator, script supervisor and writer of the pilot episode of the Canadian television series Seaway. Shot in and around Montreal in 1965, the series was distributed internationally by Lew Grade 's ITC. In 1968, Polonsky was the screenwriter for Madigan, a neo-noir film where he used his own name in the credits. The film was directed by Don Siegel and starred Richard Widmark and Henry Fonda.

After a 21-year absence, Polonsky returned to directing in 1969 with the Western, Tell Them Willie Boy Is Here. Starring Robert Redford, Robert Blake, and Katharine Ross, it's a tale of a fugitive Native American pursued by a posse. Polonsky transformed it into an allegory about racism, genocide, and persecution. In a glowing New York Times review of the film, Roger Greenspun characterized Polonsky's long absence since Force of Evil as "perhaps the most wasteful injustice of the late 1940's Hollywood blacklisting".

While working in London on his next directorial project after Romance of a Horsethief (1971)—an adaptation of Mario and the Magician starring Albert Finney—Polonsky developed a severe heart problem which required emergency surgery. He survived the procedure but was advised by his cardiologist that he could no longer handle the pressure and workload of film directing, and so from then on he confined himself to writing and teaching.

Polonsky was an uncredited contributor to the Mommie Dearest (1981) screenplay (based on Christina Crawford's memoirs of her adoptive mother Joan Crawford), and to the screenplay adaptation of A. E. Hotchner's novel The Man Who Lived at the Ritz (1988). To supplement his income, Polonsky taught a two-year production class in San Francisco State University's Film Department from 1980 to 1982. In the 1990s, he taught a philosophy class called "Consciousness and Content" at the USC School of Cinema-Television.

He publicly objected when director Irwin Winkler rewrote his script for Guilty by Suspicion (1991), a film about the Hollywood blacklist era. Winkler converted Polonsky's lead character David Merrill (played by Robert De Niro) from a Communist into a wrongly accused liberal. At that point, Polonsky was so offended by the script changes, he had his name removed from the credits. He later said he turned down "a ton of money" to withdraw from Guilty by Suspicion, but he added, "I would have sold out long ago if I could be bought." In 1996, he appeared in Thom Andersen's documentary Red Hollywood, which focused on films made by the "Hollywood Ten" and other blacklistees.

Although Polonsky had resigned his CPUSA membership in the 1950s after rejecting Stalinism, he remained committed to Marxist political theory, stating in a 1999 interview: "I was a Communist because I thought Marxism offered the best analysis of history, and I still believe that."

Until his death, Polonsky was a virulent opponent of director Elia Kazan who had "named names" of his Communist associates to the HUAC. In 1999, Polonsky was furious when he learned that Kazan would receive an Academy Honorary Award for Lifetime Achievement. Polonsky said he hoped Kazan would be shot onstage: "It would no doubt be a thrill in an otherwise dull evening." He added that his latest project was designing a movable headstone: "That way if they bury that man in the same cemetery, they can move me."

In 1998, Polonsky was a co-winner (along with Casablanca screenwriter Julius Epstein) of the Career Achievement Award presented by the Los Angeles Film Critics Association. Polonsky said during an interview prior to the award ceremony: "I have no regrets. Fighting for lost causes is a perfectly proper activity for a human being. It's one reason I've had such a helluva good life."

Abraham Polonsky died on October 26, 1999, in Beverly Hills, California. He was 88.

== Filmography ==
- Golden Earrings (with Frank Butler and Helen Deutsch) (1947)
- Body and Soul (1947)
- Force of Evil (with Ira Wolfert) (1948) (also director)
- I Can Get It for You Wholesale (with Vera Caspary) (1951)
- Odds Against Tomorrow (with Nelson Gidding) (1959) (uncredited)
- Kraft Suspense Theatre - writer of the episode The Last Clear Chance (1965) (TV)
- Seaway - writer of the episode Shipment from Marseilles, creator, executive producer (1965) (TV)
- Madigan (with Howard Rodman) (1968)
- Tell Them Willie Boy Is Here (1969) (also director)
- Romance of a Horsethief (1971) (director only)
- Avalanche Express (1979)
- Mommie Dearest (1981) (uncredited)
- Monsignor (with Wendell Mayes) (1982)
- Guilty by Suspicion (1991) (uncredited)

== Published works ==
- The Goose is Cooked (1940) (novel) – with Mitchell Wilson, and using pseudonym "Emmett Hogarth"
- The Enemy Sea (1943) (novel)
- "The Best Years of Our Lives: A Review" (1947) (essay in Hollywood Quarterly)
- "Odd Man Out and Monsieur Verdoux" (1947) (essay in Hollywood Quarterly)
- The World Above (1951) (novel)
- A Season Of Fear (1956) (novel)
- "How the Blacklist Worked in Hollywood" (1970) (essay in Film Culture)
- "Making Movies" (1971) (essay in Sight and Sound)
- "Introduction" to The Films of John Garfield by Howard Gelman (1975)
- Zenia's Way (1980) (novel)
- To Illuminate Our Time: The Blacklisted Teleplays of Abraham Polonsky (1993)
- Force of Evil: The Critical Edition (1996)
- You Are There Teleplays: The Critical Edition (1997)
- Odds Against Tomorrow: The Critical Edition (1999)
- Body and Soul: The Critical Edition (2002)
