= Walter Bernstein =

American screenwriter and film producer (1919–2021)

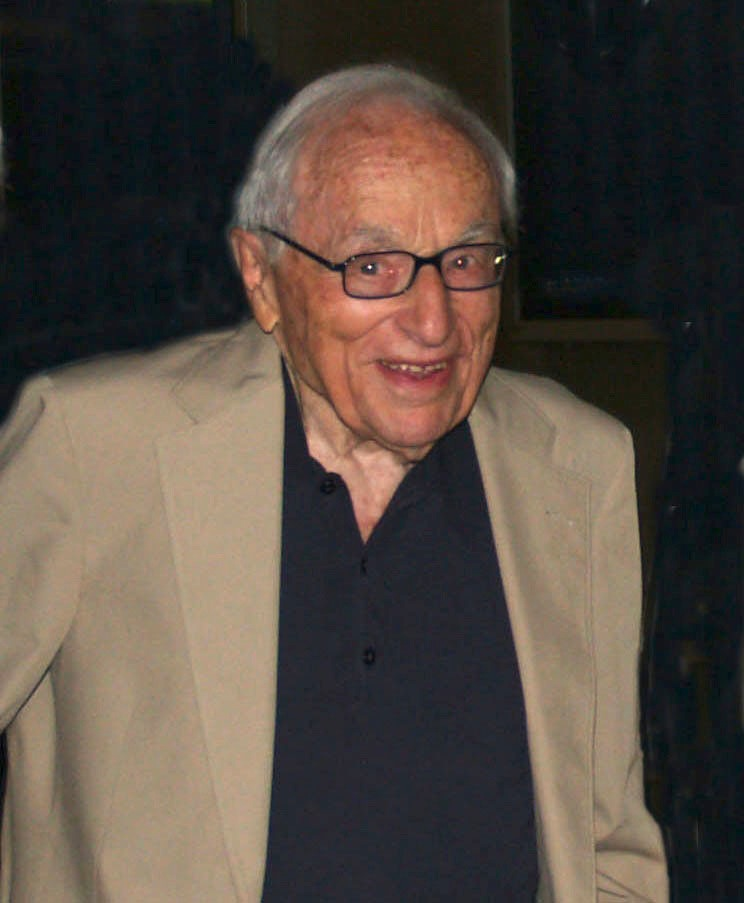
- Bernstein following a 2016 screening of The Front at the SVA Theater in Manhattan
- Born: August 20, 1919; Brooklyn, New York, U.S.
- Died: January 23, 2021 (aged 101); Manhattan, New York, U.S.
- Occupations: Screenwriter; film producer
- Years active: 1947–2017
- Spouses: Marva Spelman; Barbara Lane; Judith Braun; Gloria Loomis
- Children: 5; including Andrew and Jake

Walter Bernstein (August 20, 1919 – January 23, 2021) was an American screenwriter and film producer who was blacklisted by the Hollywood movie studios in the 1950s because of his views on communism. Some of his notable works included The Front (1976), Yanks (1979), and Little Miss Marker (1980). He was a recipient of Writers Guild of America Awards including the Ian McLellan Hunter Award and the Evelyn F. Burkey Award.

== Early life ==
Bernstein was born on August 20, 1919, in Brooklyn, New York, to Eastern European Jewish immigrants Hannah (née Bistrong) and Louis Bernstein, a teacher. He studied at Erasmus High School in Flatbush, Brooklyn. After graduating he entered a six-month immersive language course at University of Grenoble; he lived with a French family who were acquaintances of his father. It was here that Bernstein was initially exposed to communist ideas. He returned to the U.S. and attended Dartmouth College, where he gained his first writing job, as a film reviewer for the campus newspaper, and where he joined the Young Communist League. He graduated from Dartmouth in 1940.

In February 1941, Bernstein was drafted into the U.S. Army. Attaining the rank of sergeant, he spent most of World War II as a correspondent on the staff of the Army newspaper Yank, filing dispatches from Iran, Palestine, Egypt, North Africa, Sicily, and Yugoslavia. He documented his Palestine experiences in an article titled "War and Palestine".

Bernstein drew on his years in the Army for a number of articles and stories, some of which originally appeared in The New Yorker. These were collected in Keep Your Head Down, his first book, published in 1945.

== Career ==
Bernstein came to Hollywood in 1947, under a ten-week contract with writer-producer-director Robert Rossen at Columbia Pictures, working uncredited on All the King's Men. After that, Bernstein obtained his first screen credit, shared with Ben Maddow, for adapting Gerald Butler's novel Kiss the Blood Off My Hands for a film of the same name; it was produced by Harold Hecht for Universal Pictures and premiered in 1948. Bernstein returned to New York, where he resumed writing for The New Yorker and other magazines, and eventually found work as a scriptwriter in the early days of live television.

=== Blacklist ===
In 1950, because of his numerous left-wing political affiliations and related activities, Bernstein's name appeared in the publication Red Channels, resulting in his blacklisting by Hollywood studios as part of McCarthy era actions against individuals with communist beliefs and affiliations. Throughout the 1950s, however, Bernstein managed to continue writing for television by using pseudonyms and "fronts" (non-blacklisted individuals who would permit their names to appear on the work of blacklistees). In this manner, he contributed to TV programs of the era, including Danger, the CBS News docudrama series You Are There, and the mystery series Colonel March of Scotland Yard. (It has been incorrectly stated in some sources that Bernstein's blacklisting resulted from "unfriendly" testimony given to HUAC in 1951, but, in fact, he was not subpoenaed by the committee until the late 1950s, and he never actually testified.)

=== Rebound ===
Bernstein's screenwriting career began to rebound from the blacklist when director Sidney Lumet hired him to write the screenplay for the Sophia Loren movie That Kind of Woman (1959). From then on Bernstein was able to work openly on films such as Paris Blues (1961) and Fail-Safe (1964). He made contributions to the screenplays of The Magnificent Seven (1960) and The Train (1964), and was one of several writers who worked on the script for the ill-fated Something's Got to Give, which was left unfinished in 1962 due to the death of its star, Marilyn Monroe.

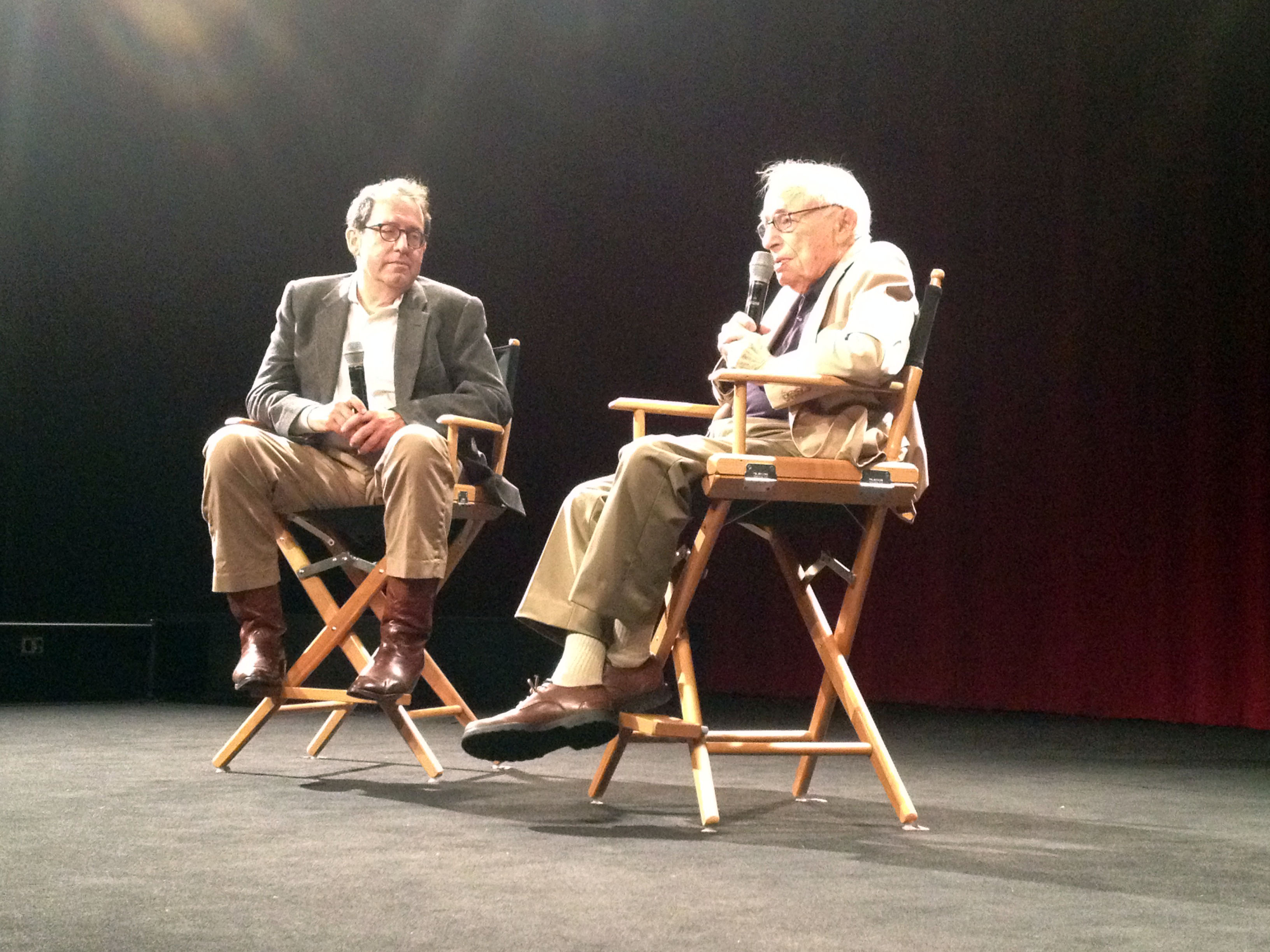
Bernstein (right), during a June 2016 Q&A with Sony Pictures Classics co-founder Michael Barker at the SVA Theater in Manhattan, which followed a screening of The Front

Paris Blues was his first feature film collaboration with director Martin Ritt, a friend since the 1940s (and himself a victim of the Hollywood blacklist); they subsequently worked together on The Molly Maguires (1970), which Bernstein also co-produced with Ritt, and The Front (1976). The latter film is a drama about a restaurant cashier (played by Woody Allen) with no real talent or political convictions who is hired to act as a "front" for blacklisted television writers during the 1950s. Bernstein based the story on his own blacklist experience when he regularly met in a New York City restaurant with close friends and fellow blacklistees Abraham Polonsky and Arnold Manoff. The three writers would discuss, and offer assistance with, the scripts they were working on anonymously for TV. They sold their work via fronts, who agreed to put their name on the script and pose as the screenwriter in conferences with the show's producer. The Front earned Bernstein an Academy Award nomination for Best Original Screenplay and the WGA Award for Best Drama Written Directly for the Screen. In 1977, Bernstein made a cameo appearance in Allen's film Annie Hall.

Bernstein was nominated for the WGA for Best Comedy Adapted from Another Medium for Semi-Tough (1977) and for a BAFTA Award for Best Screenplay for Yanks (1979). He stepped behind the camera as director of his only feature film, Little Miss Marker (1980), a remake of the 1934 film based on the Damon Runyon story of the same name. He also wrote and directed one segment of the made-for-TV movie Women & Men 2: In Love There Are No Rules (1991).

=== Teaching ===
Bernstein served until his death in 2021 as an adjunct visiting instructor and screenwriting thesis adviser at New York University's Tisch School of the Arts in the Department of Dramatic Writing.

Bernstein was also a visiting screenwriting instructor at Columbia University School of the Arts in the 1990s.

== Inside Out ==
In 1996, Bernstein published Inside Out: A Memoir of the Blacklist. The book focuses on his politics and the blacklist years. He recounts joining the Young Communist League at Dartmouth College, and the Communist Party USA (CPUSA) a year after his discharge from the Army. He remained in the CPUSA until 1956 when he dropped out in the wake of Nikita Khrushchev's February 1956 "Secret Speech" on the Stalinist cult of personality, and the Soviet repression later that year of the Hungarian Uprising. In an interview following Inside Out's publication, Bernstein spoke about the damaging effects the blacklist had on his friendships with former colleagues Robert Rossen, Elia Kazan, Budd Schulberg, and Ben Maddow, who all agreed to cooperate with the HUAC.

== Personal life ==
Bernstein was married four times, with the first three marriages to Marva Spelman, Barbara Lane, and Judith Braun, ending in divorce. He married literary agent Gloria Loomis in 1988. In the 1950s, he was also in a relationship with actress Maggie McNamara. He had two children with his first wife Marva Spelman, Joan Bernstein and Peter Spelman; and three children with his third wife Judith Braun, Nicholas Bernstein, Andrew Bernstein, and Jake Bernstein.

Walter Bernstein died of pneumonia on January 23, 2021, at the age of 101.

== Other awards ==
- In 1994, he received the Ian McLellan Hunter Memorial Award for Lifetime Achievement in Writing from the Writers Guild of America, East (WGAE).
- In 2008, the WGAE presented Bernstein with their Evelyn F. Burkey Award, given "in recognition of contributions that have brought honor and dignity to writers everywhere."

== Sources ==
- McGilligan, Patrick. Backstory 3: Interviews with Screenwriters of the 60s. Berkeley: University of California Press, 1997.
