= List of Young Sheldon episodes =

200x200

Young Sheldon is an American coming-of-age sitcom television series created by Chuck Lorre and Steven Molaro for CBS. The series is a spin-off prequel to The Big Bang Theory and chronicles the life of the character Sheldon Cooper as a child living with his family in East Texas. Iain Armitage stars as the title character. Jim Parsons, who portrayed the adult Sheldon Cooper on The Big Bang Theory, narrates the series and serves as an executive producer. In 2021, CBS renewed the series for a fifth, sixth, and seventh season, while in November 2023, it was announced that the seventh season would be its last season.

The seventh and final season, which consists of 14 episodes, premiered on February 15, 2024. During the course of the series, 141 episodes of Young Sheldon aired over seven seasons, between September 25, 2017, and May 16, 2024.

== Series overview ==
Season	Episodes	Originally released		Rank	Avg. viewers (millions)
Season	Episodes	First released	Last released	Rank	Avg. viewers (millions)
1	22	September 25, 2017	May 10, 2018	6	16.30
2	22	September 24, 2018	May 16, 2019	5	14.37
3	21	September 26, 2019	April 30, 2020	8	11.45
4	18	November 5, 2020	May 13, 2021	12	9.45
5	22	October 7, 2021	May 19, 2022	8	9.21
6	22	September 29, 2022	May 18, 2023	6	9.32
7	14	February 15, 2024	May 16, 2024	5	9.28

== Episodes ==
=== Season 1 (2017–2018) ===
No. overall	No. in season	Title	Directed by	Written by	Original release date	Prod. code	U.S. viewers (millions)
1	1	"Pilot"	Jon Favreau	Chuck Lorre & Steven Molaro	September 25, 2017	T12.15551	17.21
Sheldon Cooper, a 9-year-old genius, begins his first day of high school in the ninth grade with his older brother, George "Georgie" Cooper Jr. Having shown more skills than a typical child his age, he skipped several grades. On his first day, he questions his teachers and informs students of their rule-breaking. He tries to find his place in the new school and Georgie must deal with having a younger sibling in his class.
2	2	"Rockets, Communists, and the Dewey Decimal System"	Michael Zinberg	Chuck Lorre & Steven Molaro	November 2, 2017	T12.15552	12.66
Sheldon learns that his mother is worried about him not having any friends. He therefore, gets a copy of How to Win Friends and Influence People from the school library and tries its methods on various students and teachers without success. His sister Missy recommends that he try to make friends with other people who checked out the book since they too are looking to make friends. That also fails. He eventually meets a Vietnamese American boy named Tam who sees him with the book, and they share how difficult it has been for them to make friends. As they start speaking, they realize that they also share an interest in rocketry. Sheldon's mother is so happy that she insists Sheldon invite Tam over for dinner and lifts the ban on Sheldon's model rocketry hobby. The dinner turns awkward when Sheldon's parents and siblings exhibit cultural insensitivity as Tam tells them the story of his life. After dinner, the boys' launch attempt goes out of control just as FBI agents arrive to ask Sheldon why he was trying to buy uranium.
3	3	"Poker, Faith, and Eggs"	Michael Zinberg	Story by : Damir Konjicija & Dario Konjicija; Teleplay by : Chuck Lorre & Steven Molaro	November 9, 2017	T12.15553	12.39
Sheldon debates the relationship between religion and science with Pastor Jeff, while Billy Sparks brings some eggs for Missy. George suffers a mild heart attack, so Mary takes him to the hospital after calling her mother, Connie, to watch the children. While Connie is sleeping, Georgie "borrows" her car and takes the other children to see their father. Sheldon prays to Blaise Pascal for his father's recovery in the hospital chapel. Sheldon briefly doubts his atheism when he does recover, but he immediately gets over it after his family eats Billy's eggs and suffers from food poisoning. When Sheldon gets into another debate with Pastor Jeff, George pretends to have heart trouble to get his family out of the church service. Note: Annie Potts makes her first appearance as Mary's mother, Connie Tucker, known to Sheldon and Missy as "Meemaw".
4	4	"A Therapist, a Comic Book, and a Breakfast Sausage"	Jaffar Mahmood	Story by : Chuck Lorre & Steven Molaro; Teleplay by : Rob Ulin & Dave Bickel	November 16, 2017	T12.15554	11.83
Sheldon chokes on sausage and becomes fearful of solid foods. His parents take him to a psychiatrist, Dr. Goetsch, who talks to his parents first, telling Sheldon he can read any of the comic books in the waiting room. Although Sheldon had previously not been interested in comic books, he starts reading X-Men, which inspires him. He then leaves Dr. Goetsch's office and wanders away to a comic bookstore to read the next volume of X-Men. He runs into Tam, who is eating licorice at the store. Due to his fear of solid foods, Sheldon initially refuses the licorice that Tam offers him but eventually gives in and eats one, resolving his eating disorder. Meanwhile, Connie babysits Georgie and Missy and comforts them with their invisible feelings because Sheldon's quirks take most of their parents' attention.
5	5	"A Solar Calculator, a Game Ball, and a Cheerleader's Bosom"	Chris Koch	Story by : Chuck Lorre & Steven Molaro; Teleplay by : Damir Konjicija & Dario Konjicija	November 23, 2017	T12.15555	11.43
Sheldon uses sports analytics to help his school's football team, coached by his father, win games, but immediately becomes too popular for his taste as a result. Georgie struggles with his father neglecting him in favor of spending time with Sheldon, while Missy and Tam revel in Sheldon's new popularity. Meanwhile, Connie also asks for his advice regarding her sports bets. Sheldon gets a B+ on a math test due to his exhaustion after accompanying Tam to a party and decides that he cannot keep helping the team and continue giving Connie advice. He tells on his family to Mary, which prompts her to reprimand them on their actions. George begins ignoring Sheldon again for being a "snitch" and reconciles with Georgie. Ray Liotta makes a cameo appearance as a loan shark.
6	6	"A Patch, a Modem, and a Zantac®"	Don Scardino	Story by : Chuck Lorre & Steven Molaro; Teleplay by : Anthony Gioe & Nick Mandernach	November 30, 2017	T12.15556	12.11
Dr. Ronald Hodges, a NASA engineer, appears as a guest speaker in Sheldon's science class and does not take his idea about VTVL technology seriously, making Sheldon go to great lengths to prove him wrong. He tries to do the calculations himself, but he needs a computer. When he realizes the family cannot afford one, he becomes frustrated, which causes him a stress ulcer. Sheldon takes the opportunity to use his doctor's computer and internet access to complete his calculations and send his results to NASA. When no reply comes, Sheldon gets depressed, prompting George to impulsively drive the family to the Johnson Space Center and demand that Hodges listen to Sheldon's idea. Hodges admits it is theoretically valid but that NASA lacks the technical capability to implement it at that time. Sheldon concludes that he is ahead of his time. On the way home, he thanks his father for standing up for him. 27 years later, a flashforward in 2016 shows the successful SpaceX CRS-8 mission, followed by SpaceX co-founder Elon Musk looking over Sheldon's old notebook then hiding it in a desk drawer.
7	7	"A Brisket, Voodoo, and Cannonball Run"	Mark Cendrowski	Story by : Nick Bakay; Teleplay by : Chuck Lorre & Steven Molaro	December 7, 2017	T12.15557	12.49
Connie's disdain for George emerges when she refuses to give him her brisket recipe. George later complains that Mary always takes her mother's side. Connie gives him a fake recipe that requires him to go to great lengths to get the ingredients to get back at George for secretly searching her home for it. After George spends 14 hours cooking in vain, he attempts to ban her from the household. When Georgie and Missy fear their parents might divorce over this, Sheldon suddenly recalls a memory of Connie telling him her recipe when he was 23 months old, so he threatens to reveal it unless the two of them make up. While he initially shows his interest in the recipe, George states that he is more bothered by the fact that she never thought he was good enough for her daughter. He acknowledges that he was disappointing when they first met, but he believes he has grown since then. Connie seemingly accepts him as a worthy son-in-law, only for George to get the recipe from Sheldon as soon as she leaves.
8	8	"Cape Canaveral, Schrödinger's Cat, and Cyndi Lauper's Hair"	Howie Deutch	Story by : Chuck Lorre & Steven Molaro; Teleplay by : David Bickel	December 14, 2017	T12.15558	11.64
George takes the boys to Florida to see a Space Shuttle launch as a way to cater to Sheldon's interests for a change, but it gets rained out. To cheer him up, George plays dumb and asks Sheldon how lightning and thunder work, leading the latter to appreciate the former more. Meanwhile, Mary, Missy, and Connie go to a beauty salon. Mary and Connie get into a heated argument after the latter comments on the former for being "no fun" for forbidding Missy to dye her hair, but both later make amends with one another.
9	9	"Spock, Kirk, and Testicular Hernia"	Peter Lauer	Chuck Lorre & Steven Molaro	December 21, 2017	T12.15559	11.32
Sheldon tutors Georgie for their math test, only to discover that the latter cheated to pass. Since Star Trek character Captain Kirk also got away with cheating on the Kobayashi Maru test, Sheldon decides to adapt the "playing fast-and-loose with the rules" lifestyle he believes both Georgie and Kirk embrace by forging Mary's signature on a note excusing him from P.E. class and not properly checking out school library books. He eventually gets caught after Coach Wilkins shows George the note, prompting Mary to tell off Sheldon and force him to make amends by returning the books and going back to P.E., where Coach Wilkins makes him do the rope climb.
10	10	"An Eagle Feather, a String Bean, and an Eskimo"	Rebecca Asher	Story by : Chuck Lorre & Steven Molaro; Teleplay by : Rob Ulin & David Bickel	January 4, 2018	T12.15560	14.70
Sheldon's principal asks Mary and George to consider sending Sheldon to a school for the gifted in Dallas. Sheldon and his teachers are delighted by the idea, but his family (except for Georgie) quickly begins to miss him. Sheldon enjoys the intellectual stimulation, but dislikes the folk rock-singing family that he lives with, and is unable to sleep after the folk-rock piano session that they have after dinner. When George impulsively drives to Dallas to bring him home, Sheldon is happy to go back home, but is upset when George turns on the radio which, coincidentally, plays the same song the family was playing at their house, before George turns it off.
11	11	"Demons, Sunday School, and Prime Numbers"	Howie Deutch	Story by : Chuck Lorre & Steven Molaro; Teleplay by : Chuck Lorre & Steven Molaro & Eric Kaplan	January 11, 2018	T12.15561	14.17
Mary becomes worried when she finds Sheldon playing with a Demonic figure from Dungeons & Dragons with Tam and Billy. She tries to get Tam's and Billy's parents' help to put an end to the game, but they see it as harmless. Mary then seeks advice from Pastor Jeff, who, with Mary, convinces Sheldon to study Baptist theology. Sheldon, however, takes it a step further and starts researching all the major religions, quizzing Tam on what being a Catholic involves and Ira Rosenbloom on being Jewish. He is ultimately unsatisfied with all the major religions. One night, he has a dream about two living numbers, a 1 and a 0, who almost reveal the secrets of the universe to him before Georgie wakes him up. He then decides to start his religion which he calls "Mathology," and the only sin is being stupid.
12	12	"A Computer, a Plastic Pony, and a Case of Beer"	Richie Keen	Story by : Chuck Lorre & Steven Molaro; Teleplay by : Chuck Lorre & Steven Molaro & Tara Hernandez	January 18, 2018	T12.15562	13.33
Sheldon asks Mary to buy him a Tandy 1000 SL computer. George insists that they cannot afford it, but Mary reveals that she has been secretly saving money. They get into a heated argument about the secret fund, which prompts Mary to take Sheldon and Missy to live with Connie for a while. She buys Sheldon the computer to make a point to George. While Sheldon is initially thrilled, he finds that its ELIZA psychotherapy program's advice on fixing his parents' marriage proves to be useless. Connie eavesdrops on Sheldon and forces Mary to feel out George to get her out of her house. Meanwhile, Georgie advises George to apologize to Mary, which the latter eventually does. In the ensuing days, the family finds various uses for the computer. Sheldon uses it to determine how much money his father spends on beer, concluding that if he switched to punch they could "double the size of their house", Missy uses it for gambling, Mary uses it to organize her recipes, and Connie is clueless as to how it works, assuming the mouse is a telephone.
13	13	"A Sneeze, Detention, and Sissy Spacek"	Howie Deutch	Story by : Chuck Lorre & Steven Molaro; Teleplay by : Eric Kaplan & Jeremy Howe	February 1, 2018	T12.15563	12.92
Sheldon's mysophobia surfaces when influenza hits his school. He is successively sentenced to detention and suspension for leaving his class and the school after his teacher got a cold, escaping from other people who had the flu, and escaping from detention after the other teacher had a tickle in his throat. He then uses his suspension time in an attempt to convert the garage into a closed ecological system instead of doing extra chores for the entire week of suspension. While George, Missy, and Connie are mostly amused by him, Mary is the only member of the family to be worried about him. Meanwhile, Georgie takes advantage of Sheldon's situation to gain sympathetic hugs from girls at school. With numerous attempts to get him out of the garage proving futile, Connie finally coaxes Sheldon out by appealing to his pride as a Texan. Nevertheless, he gets sick but feels better when his mother sings "Soft Kitty" to him.
14	14	"Potato Salad, a Broomstick, and Dad's Whiskey"	Howie Deutch	Chuck Lorre & Steven Molaro & Tara Hernandez	March 1, 2018	T12.15564	12.42
Mary gets a job as church secretary, but Pastor Jeff quickly begins asking her for advice since his beautiful new wife does not speak English and is spending all his money. Since Mary does not get home until 6 pm and Connie refuses to watch them until then, Missy and Sheldon become latchkey kids. When Connie peeks in on the twins, they think she is a burglar and spray her with a fire extinguisher. When Sheldon gets a splinter in his finger, Missy searches all over the house for tweezers with which to extract it. She eventually finds them in an Operation game and successfully removes the splinter.
15	15	"Dolomite, Apple Slices, and a Mystery Woman"	Mark Cendrowski	Story by : Chuck Lorre & Steven Molaro; Teleplay by : Chuck Lorre & Steven Molaro & Tara Hernandez	March 8, 2018	T12.15565	12.52
Sheldon and Tam befriend Libby, an 11th-grade girl interested in geology. During one of their lunches at the library, Libby offers to drive the three of them to the Houston Museum of Natural Science to see an IMAX film. However, Sheldon is devastated to learn that Libby thinks of him as a child during her talk with Mary. While Sheldon resolves never to make any more friends, Mary assures him that he will be surrounded by many of them who are also smart. Tam and Libby go to Houston without Sheldon to see the film, where Libby rejects Tam's advances. Sheldon and Tam later revert to a two-person social group, where Sheldon reconsiders geology as "not a science" to the point where he considers it more a hobby.
16	16	"Killer Asteroids, Oklahoma, and a Frizzy Hair Machine"	Howie Deutch	Story by : Chuck Lorre & Steven Molaro; Teleplay by : Steven Molaro	March 29, 2018	T12.15566	11.91
At the school science fair, Sheldon is devastated when his asteroid impact avoidance project loses to another student's Van de Graaf generator and vows to quit science. After a therapy session with Dr. Goetsch, Sheldon decides to become an actor. In acting class, he impresses the drama teacher, Mr. Lundy, and gets the lead role in Annie. His parents worry about him playing a female role, but Sheldon dismisses their concerns until he experiences stage fright on opening night and refuses to perform, leaving Mr. Lundy to take over his role.
17	17	"Jiu-Jitsu, Bubble Wrap, and Yoo-Hoo"	Jaffar Mahmood	Story by : Chuck Lorre & Steven Molaro; Teleplay by : Tara Hernandez & Jeremy Howe	April 5, 2018	T12.15567	11.66
Sheldon is being bullied by Bobbi Sparks, a six-year-old girl who is his neighbor. His parents have different ideas about how to handle the situation, neither of which is effective. In the end, George and Bobbi's dad hang out and plan to tell their wives the made-up story of them being involved in a deadly fight. Sheldon even tries paying Missy to warn Bobbi off using his life savings, but that plan eventually fails.
18	18	"A Mother, A Child, and a Blue Man's Backside"	Jaffar Mahmood	Story by : Chuck Lorre & Steven Molaro & Teagan Wall; Teleplay by : David Bickel & Damir Konjicija & Dario Konjicija	April 12, 2018	T12.15568	11.70
After Mary confiscates Sheldon's comic books due to the rather explicit content in an issue of Watchmen, Sheldon demands to be treated like an adult. He fails his every attempt at adulthood until a tornado warning reminds him of his family values.
19	19	"Gluons, Guacamole, and the Color Purple"	Alex Reid	Chuck Lorre & Steven Molaro & Tara Hernandez	April 19, 2018	T12.15569	11.67
Connie drives Sheldon to a nearby college so that he can audit a weekly class on quantum chromodynamics. The professor, Dr. John Sturgis, asks Connie out on a date. She has a nice time, but finds that he is like an older version of Sheldon. The following week, she has to leave the class because her presence is too distracting for Sturgis. Meanwhile, Missy gets Georgie to help her with her homework. Stimulated by Sheldon's example, they actually make some progress.
20	20	"A Dog, A Squirrel, and a Fish Named Fish"	Jaffar Mahmood	Story by : Damir Konjicija & Dario Konjicija & Teagan Wall; Teleplay by : Chuck Lorre & Steven Molaro & David Bickel	April 26, 2018	T12.15570	11.15
Sheldon's cynophobia surfaces when the Sparks family begins taking care of a relative's dog, which shows a strange attraction to Sheldon. The families are unable to agree about how to control the dog until Pastor Jeff mediates. Sheldon tries to overcome his fear by dressing in protective clothing and petting the dog, but this backfires when the dog licks him, apparently stimulated by the smell of his Brylcreem. Connie tries to get Sheldon accustomed to animals by buying him a fish, but the fish bites both him and George.
21	21	"Summer Sausage, a Pocket Poncho, and Tony Danza"	Alex Reid	Story by : Steven Molaro & Eric Kaplan & Stacey Pulwer; Teleplay by : Chuck Lorre & Tara Hernandez & Connor Kilpatrick	May 3, 2018	T12.15571	11.67
Sheldon invites Dr. Sturgis to dinner without telling anyone. The next evening, Dr. Sturgis comes to Connie's house to cook her some Sichuan cuisine, after which she invites him to stay for the night. Sheldon monitors the events through his binoculars. George takes Missy, who is dressed as a princess, to dinner at Red Lobster. That leaves Mary and Georgie to have dinner together, where he questions her about the chronology of his conception.
22	22	"Vanilla Ice Cream, Gentleman Callers, and a Dinette Set"	Jaffar Mahmood	Story by : Jeremy Howe & Damir Konjicija & Dario Konjicija; Teleplay by : Chuck Lorre & Steven Molaro & Eric Kaplan	May 10, 2018	T12.15572	12.44
Connie tries to date Dr. Sturgis and Ira simultaneously, but then decides to dump Ira, who tries to win her back by giving her furniture. Dr. Sturgis goes to confront Ira and they reach an understanding. Connie is furious that Dr. Sturgis did that without her permission and that Sheldon is meddling in their relationship. It then occurs to Sheldon that he can draw up a relationship agreement which covers the three of them. He also mentions that he eventually draws up a contract for his own children.

=== Season 2 (2018–2019) ===
No. overall	No. in season	Title	Directed by	Written by	Original release date	Prod. code	U.S. viewers (millions)
23	1	"A High-Pitched Buzz and Training Wheels"	Jaffar Mahmood	Story by : Chuck Lorre & Steven Molaro; Teleplay by : David Bickel & Eric Kaplan & Jeremy Howe	September 24, 2018	T12.16053	10.58
Sheldon takes apart the refrigerator in order to stop it from emitting a buzzing sound, which forces George to pay $200 to a repairman. Sheldon then gets a job delivering newspapers so he can reimburse George, but the job turns out to be difficult and stressful. He eventually outsources the work to Billy Sparks.
24	2	"A Rival Prodigy and Sir Isaac Neutron"	Mark Cendrowski	Story by : Chuck Lorre & Steven Molaro & David Bickel; Teleplay by : Damir Konjicija & Dario Konjicija & Tara Hernandez	September 27, 2018	T12.16052	10.21
Sheldon is joined in Dr. Sturgis's physics class by Paige, who is slightly smarter and younger than he is, causing him to be jealous. Paige and her family visit the Coopers. Her parents begin bickering after talking with George and Mary about raising a gifted child, Sheldon is still jealous of Paige, but Missy and Georgie like her older sister. Dr. Sturgis learns that he must not praise Paige too much in front of Sheldon.
25	3	"A Crisis of Faith and Octopus Aliens"	Jaffar Mahmood	Story by : Chuck Lorre & David Bickel & Eric Kaplan; Teleplay by : Steven Molaro & Maria Ferrari & Jeremy Howe	October 4, 2018	T12.16051	10.68
Mary questions her faith in God after hearing about a sixteen-year-old girl in the congregation who died in an accident. Despite his atheism, as he challenges Pastor Jeff how God would look like in an alien planet with octopuses, Sheldon helps Mary find her faith in God again by using the teleological argument.
26	4	"A Financial Secret and Fish Sauce"	Jonathan Judge	Story by : Chuck Lorre & David Bickel & Jeremy Howe; Teleplay by : Steven Molaro & Damir Konjicija & Dario Konjicija	October 11, 2018	T12.16054	11.18
While doing his parents' taxes, Sheldon finds a $300 discrepancy due to a missing check, but George does not want to talk about it and requires Sheldon to keep this a secret from his mother. Sheldon becomes so stressed by the requirement to keep the secret that he asks to stay overnight at Tam's house to avoid Mary. During the sleepover, he confesses to Tam (although Tam is not a priest, Sheldon reasons that it makes perfect sense because anyway Sheldon is not Catholic, he is Baptist, while Tam is Catholic) and feels his conscience lifted. After the sleepover, Sheldon pressures George to come clean to Mary. The missing $300 turns out to have been a fine Connie had to pay for being caught behind the wheel while inebriated (even though Georgie was the driver). Because her secret was exposed, Connie gets back at George and tells Mary how George once relieved himself in the church's vegetable garden.
27	5	"A Research Study and Czechoslovakian Wedding Pastries"	Jude Weng	Story by : Steven Molaro & Damir Konjicija & Dario Konjicija; Teleplay by : Chuck Lorre & David Bickel & Eric Kaplan	October 18, 2018	T12.16055	11.00
Dr. Sturgis suggests that Sheldon and Missy begin participating in a weekly twin study. Mary is concerned about possible effects on the children, but George likes the money that was being offered by Dr.Sturgis, who had also agreed to take care of the fuel, and also offered $300 that the study pays every week. Sheldon excels at the analytical tests, but has little patience for the tests of perceptiveness, while Missy is the opposite. She also suggests ways that her psychologist could make herself more attractive to her colleague. While monitoring the sessions, Mary learns that Missy feels a bit neglected, so she is given the choice of restaurant on the way home.
28	6	"Seven Deadly Sins and a Small Carl Sagan"	Chris Koch	Story by : Chuck Lorre & David Bickel & Jeremy Howe; Teleplay by : Chuck Lorre & Eric Kaplan & Connor Kilpatrick	October 25, 2018	T12.16056	10.96
Pastor Jeff wants to put on a Halloween Hell House ("Heck House") to warn children and teenagers of the consequences of sin and puts Mary in charge. She enlists the help of Mr. Lundy, who then takes over the whole production. He dresses as Satan and sets up a different room in a vacant house for each of the seven deadly sins. The last room is heaven, featuring Mary dressed as an angel, but the only person who wants to be saved from sin is Georgie's date, Veronica. Meanwhile, Sheldon dresses as Carl Sagan for trick-or-treating, but only one person recognizes his costume.
29	7	"Carbon Dating and a Stuffed Raccoon"	Rebecca Asher	Story by : Chuck Lorre & Damir Konjicija & Dario Konjicija; Teleplay by : Steven Molaro & Eric Kaplan & Tara Hernandez	November 1, 2018	T12.16057	11.07
George takes Sheldon to a lecture on carbon dating, which is also being attended by Paige. While waiting in a restaurant, he is separately approached by Paige's parents, whose marriage is precarious because of the demands of raising Paige. The children become bored by the lecture and wander into a closed area of the museum. Meanwhile, Connie is holding a garage sale, and becomes upset by the sight of Dr. Sturgis wearing her dead husband's jacket.
30	8	"An 8-Bit Princess and a Flat Tire Genius"	Jaffar Mahmood	Story by : Chuck Lorre & Damir Konjicija & Dario Konjicija; Teleplay by : Steven Molaro & David Bickel & Tara Hernandez	November 8, 2018	T12.16058	11.00
Connie and Sheldon become addicted to video games. She even pulls him out of school so he can play with her, since she had promised not to play without him. Meanwhile, Georgie takes a part-time job at Herschel Sparks' garage, where he displays a definite talent for tire repair.
31	9	"Family Dynamics and a Red Fiero"	Alex Reid	Story by : Steven Molaro & Maria Ferrari & Tara Hernandez; Teleplay by : Chuck Lorre & Eric Kaplan & Jeremy Howe	November 15, 2018	T12.16059	10.77
Sheldon takes a psychology class as his elective, and is told to observe family dynamics over the Thanksgiving weekend. He sees his parents argue over whether or not George should accept a higher-paying job coaching at the University of Tulsa, since his family does not want to leave Medford. George rejects the offer and Sheldon becomes unexpectedly emotional while reading his report to his class.
32	10	"A Stunted Childhood and a Can of Fancy Mixed Nuts"	Rebecca Asher	Chuck Lorre & Steven Molaro & Tara Hernandez	December 6, 2018	T12.16060	10.91
Missy and Paige have a sleepover. After learning that people with a stunted childhood become social outcasts, Sheldon tries to be more like a 10-year-old by playing practical jokes on various people. After finally succeeding with Missy, he becomes satisfied with his social progress. Meanwhile, John asks Connie to teach him how to drive a car. He fails to become proficient, but they then state their love for each other.
33	11	"A Race of Superhumans and a Letter to Alf"	Jaffar Mahmood	Story by : Tara Hernandez & Damir Konjicija & Dario Konjicija; Teleplay by : Chuck Lorre & Steven Molaro & Eric Kaplan	January 3, 2019	T12.16061	10.95
Sheldon tries to teach math to Missy using Socratic questioning and operant conditioning, causing her to slug him when he threatens to damage her Cabbage Patch doll unless she learns calculus. Georgie joins Mary's bible study group so that he can be close to Veronica. They get baptized together, but she slugs him when he kisses her. Mary berates and grounds her sons for their actions.
34	12	"A Tummy Ache and a Whale of a Metaphor"	Mark Cendrowski	Story by : Chuck Lorre & Steven Molaro; Teleplay by : Tara Hernandez & Jeremy Howe & Connor Kilpatrick	January 10, 2019	T12.16062	12.05
Sheldon has to go to a hospital for several days to get his gall bladder removed. He is a difficult patient until he gets a roommate with a hole in his heart. All of his family (except for Georgie) miss him.
35	13	"A Nuclear Reactor and a Boy Called Lovey"	Chris Koch	Story by : Chuck Lorre & Steven Molaro & Tara Hernandez; Teleplay by : Chuck Lorre & Steven Molaro & Eric Kaplan	January 17, 2019	T12.16064	11.46
Georgie is humiliated at school when he tries to win back Veronica, Mary insists that George tell her who his first crush was, Connie has to break up a shoving match between John and another scientist who was getting too friendly towards her, and Sheldon acquires a box of defective smoke detectors so that he can take out the Americium-241 and build a nuclear power plant for the neighborhood. Government agents in hazmat suits then arrive.
36	14	"David, Goliath, and a Yoo-hoo from the Back"	Jaffar Mahmood	Story by : Chuck Lorre & Jeremy Howe & Stacey Pulwer; Teleplay by : Steven Molaro & Maria Ferrari & Tara Hernandez	January 31, 2019	T12.16063	11.58
Sheldon witnesses Georgie being bullied by a fellow student, and strikes up a friendship with the bully that enables him to coerce services from Georgie. However, Sheldon brags about the relationship to an even bigger bully, which results in Sheldon being imprisoned in a locker overnight. Meanwhile, Missy steals Connie's makeup for school picture day, accuses Mary of being a killjoy, and has to spend the night with Connie. Connie then explains to her that Mary became a devout Christian because Missy almost died at birth, causing her to change her attitude towards her mother.
37	15	"A Math Emergency and Perky Palms"	Jaffar Mahmood	Story by : Chuck Lorre & Steven Molaro; Teleplay by : Tara Hernandez & Jeremy Howe & Connor Kilpatrick	February 7, 2019	T12.16065	12.06
Dr. Sturgis gives Sheldon a 95% on a physics test, which Sheldon disputes. Eventually, Dr. Sturgis admits that Sheldon was right, and deserved a perfect score. Pastor Jeff becomes ill, and asks Mary to take over his duties, such as providing counseling to a pair of newlyweds, and visiting a former military officer who is a shut-in with failing health; the visit to the curmudgeonly recluse is difficult, but when Mary tries to visit him again, she discovers that he has died.
38	16	"A Loaf of Bread and a Grand Old Flag"	Alex Reid	Story by : Chuck Lorre & Steven Molaro; Teleplay by : Tara Hernandez & Jeremy Howe & Connor Kilpatrick	February 21, 2019	T12.16066	11.31
Sheldon's favorite brand of bread tastes different, so he begins a campaign to advocate for tight government regulation of bakeries. During a TV interview, he inadvertently says that communism might be the answer to the bread crisis, so the Cooper family is shunned by the town. Meanwhile, Veronica breaks up with her boyfriend, so she and Georgie become "just friends", and due to the students dismissing Georgie as a communist, Veronica is the only one who wants to sit next to him at lunch. Later, George appears with Sheldon on TV to proclaim their allegiance to America.
39	17	"Albert Einstein and the Story of Another Mary"	Beth McCarthy-Miller	Story by : Chuck Lorre & Steven Molaro & Eric Kaplan; Teleplay by : Chuck Lorre & Steven Molaro & Steve Holland	March 7, 2019	T12.16067	11.57
Mary becomes pregnant, causing George to worry about finances. He does get a pay raise from the school, but Mary suffers a miscarriage. Meanwhile, Sheldon takes up violin lessons to be more like Albert Einstein. Noticing the prevalence of Jews like Einstein in physics, he decides to become Jewish himself. A rabbi then talks him out of it.
40	18	"A Perfect Score and a Bunsen Burner Marshmallow"	Chris Koch	Story by : Chuck Lorre & David Bickel & Tara Hernandez; Teleplay by : Steven Molaro & Eric Kaplan & Jeremy Howe	April 4, 2019	T12.16068	10.50
Colleges begin to take notice of Sheldon after he gets a perfect score on his PSAT/NMSQT. To gain some experience in living at a college, he stays overnight with John. The experience is mostly enjoyable, but after he accidentally starts a fire in the kitchen, he is happy to return home. Mary is delighted, since she had been experiencing empty nest syndrome.
41	19	"A Political Campaign and a Candy Land Cheater"	Jude Weng	Story by : Chuck Lorre & Damir Konjicija & Dario Konjicija; Teleplay by : Steven Molaro & David Bickel & Steve Holland	April 25, 2019	T12.16069	10.46
Annoyed that so many school funds go to football instead of the science classroom, Sheldon decides to run for class president. The campaign goes badly until Sheldon decides to fight dirty using information that Missy got from his opponent's younger sister; she's originally from New York. Sheldon uses Texas pride to win. However, Principal Petersen vetoes his use of an old version of the Pledge of Allegiance.
42	20	"A Proposal and a Popsicle Stick Cross"	Jaffar Mahmood	Story by : Chuck Lorre & David Bickel & Steve Holland; Teleplay by : Steven Molaro & Tara Hernandez & Jeremy Howe	May 2, 2019	T12.16070	10.73
When Veronica has problems at home, the Coopers take her in for a few days, thrilling Georgie. She fits in well with all the family and Georgie's kindness makes her actually start to have feelings for him. George steps in when her mother's boyfriend tries to take her home against her will. Meanwhile, Dr. Sturgis proposes to Connie after a year of dating, only to hear she never thought she'd marry again, upsetting him. Connie takes out a large newspaper ad proclaiming her love for him, winning him back.
43	21	"A Broken Heart and a Crock Monster"	Alex Reid	Story by : Chuck Lorre & Damir Konjicija & Dario Konjicija; Teleplay by : Steven Molaro & Tara Hernandez & Jeremy Howe	May 9, 2019	T12.16071	10.48
Pastor Jeff stays with the Coopers while he has marital problems, making things uncomfortable for Mary and George and bonding with Georgie over girl problems. When he finds his wife has left him, he considers leaving the church until he meets Robin, a female police officer. Sheldon and Missy get many donations for the church, while Connie takes Dr. Sturgis to the casino. He does not enjoy it very much and is put off by her attitude while losing, until she has a big win.
44	22	"A Swedish Science Thing and the Equation for Toast"	Jaffar Mahmood	Story by : Chuck Lorre & Damir Konjicija & Dario Konjicija; Teleplay by : Steven Molaro & Eric Kaplan & Tara Hernandez	May 16, 2019	T12.16072	13.60
Georgie uses his own money to pay for cable TV service, but when he will not allow his father to use it, George presents him with a bill for his services. Sheldon invites the entire school to a listening party for the announcement of the Nobel Prize winners in Physics over a shortwave radio. Due to the time difference between Sweden (where the announcements are made) and Texas, the announcement comes at five o'clock in the morning local time, so nobody attends Sheldon's party except Mary, whom he excuses after realizing that she is not really interested in the Nobels and only felt sorry for him. Although he helped Sheldon set up the shortwave radio, Dr. Sturgis does not attend Sheldon's party, as the looming announcement triggers a depressive episode regarding his (likely permanent) lack of a Nobel for his own work. Sheldon begins to cry as the results are read out, believing he will remain friendless for the rest of his life; however, a subsequent montage reveals the current whereabouts of his present-day friends - including Leonard also listening to the Nobels broadcast, Raj doing schoolwork, Howard playing video games, Penny and Bernadette both sleeping, and his future wife Amy reading Little House on the Prairie with a flashlight - and the adult Sheldon notes that "thankfully", this belief was wrong.

=== Season 3 (2019–2020) ===
No. overall	No. in season	Title	Directed by	Written by	Original release date	Prod. code	U.S. viewers (millions)
45	1	"Quirky Eggheads and Texas Snow Globes"	Jaffar Mahmood	Story by : Chuck Lorre & Tara Hernandez & Jeremy Howe; Teleplay by : Steven Molaro & Steve Holland & Maria Ferrari	September 26, 2019	T12.16451	8.24
Following Dr. Sturgis's hospitalization in a mental hospital, Mary worries something similar may happen to Sheldon. With Mary being indirect in trying to evaluate Sheldon's mental state, her questions cause Sheldon to be concerned about her mental health. This is resolved at the psychologist's office once Mary reveals the reason for her questioning. Meanwhile, Georgie discovers that a local gift shop is going out of business, and is selling snow globes for $1 each. He asks George for money to purchase a large quantity of snow globes with the intent of selling them at $5 each. His father dismisses the idea. Georgie initially fails with his plan until he figures out a way to play on the locals' nostalgia for snow in Texas to sell the snow globes.
46	2	"A Broom Closet and Satan's Monopoly Board"	Alex Reid	Story by : Chuck Lorre & Steven Molaro & Steve Holland; Teleplay by : Tara Hernandez & Jeremy Howe & Connor Kilpatrick	October 3, 2019	T12.16452	8.35
Believing he is not being challenged enough at school, Sheldon decides to skip his classes and study independently in a broom closet within the school library. Once discovered, George and Mary disagree on who has responsibility to resolve the matter. Connie suggests having Sheldon audit Dr. Linkletter's physics course while Dr. Sturgis is hospitalized during one argument. Although the problem with Sheldon is solved, George is disturbed by his fight with Mary, and with the advice of Assistant Coach Wilkins, George invites Mary for date night. Meanwhile, Pastor Jeff tries to ward off his desires for intimacy with his girlfriend, Officer Robin, and Mary assists him with that. Pastor Jeff calls Mary's home for assistance, but he speaks to Missy instead, since Mary is out on her date night with George. Missy lies to Pastor Jeff about her and Georgie's experimentation with a Ouija board. Missy then fears that the lie will land her in hell, so she calls Pastor Jeff back to confess. The call back occurs just as Pastor Jeff was about to get intimate with his girlfriend, which he interpreted as a sign from God to cease. In response, Officer Robin asks Pastor Jeff to marry her.
47	3	"An Entrepreneurialist and a Swat on the Bottom"	Mark Cendrowski	Story by : Steve Holland & Maria Ferrari & Connor Kilpatrick; Teleplay by : Steven Molaro & Eric Kaplan & Jeremy Howe	October 10, 2019	T12.16453	7.63
Dr. Linkletter, wanting to create additional opportunities to meet with Connie, invites Sheldon to a robotics lecture. Connie feels uncomfortable and refuses to take Sheldon to the lecture. Sheldon accuses Connie of being selfish, so she spanks him (offscreen). His parents also refuse to drive him, hearing of his disrespect towards Connie. Sheldon also accuses his parents of being more selfish than Connie, so they ground him for a month. Sheldon, therefore, decides to take a bus to visit Dr. Sturgis at the mental hospital. Before the police track him down, a seatmate on the bus convinces Sheldon that he is in the wrong. He then 'apologizes' to his parents and Connie by showing them an episode of Star Trek that conveys his feelings, but they do not quite get it. Meanwhile, Georgie's latest get-rich-quick scheme (selling candy for half the price of the school's vending machine) nets him much money, which impresses Veronica, but she rejects the expensive necklace he buys her. Hence, he buys her a cheap candy bracelet instead.
48	4	"Hobbitses, Physicses and a Ball with Zip"	Jaffar Mahmood	Story by : Steven Molaro & Eric Kaplan & Tara Hernandez; Teleplay by : Steven Holland & Maria Ferrari & Connor Kilpatrick	October 17, 2019	T12.16454	7.94
Sheldon becomes obsessed with solving the unified field theory, a problem unsolved by Einstein. This worries Mary, so Sheldon (unsuccessfully) tries to distract himself with other activities. The school librarian suggests that Sheldon do something that is the "opposite of science," leading Sheldon to conclude that reading fiction is the closest alternative. He starts reading The Lord of the Rings, but becomes obsessed with figuring out discrepancies in the storyline. When Sheldon falls asleep, he dreams about a battle between "the Hobbitses" and "the Physicses" for his attention. With "the Physicses" winning, Sheldon goes back to focusing on physics after waking up. Meanwhile, Missy becomes infatuated with a boy who is into baseball. She, therefore, asks George to teach her how to throw and catch a baseball and how to sound intelligent talking about baseball. The plan fails because the boy is interested in another girl, but the time spent with George helps Missy bond with him. George then teaches Missy how to throw a curveball, a skill that she uses to throw an apple at the boy who hurt her feelings.
49	5	"A Pineapple and the Bosom of Male Friendship"	Alex Reid	Story by : Chuck Lorre & Steve Holland & Maria Ferrari; Teleplay by : Steven Molaro & Tara Hernandez & Jeremy Howe	October 24, 2019	T12.16455	8.66
Dr. Sturgis is released from the mental hospital and comes with Connie for dinner at Cooper's home. After dinner, Dr. Sturgis breaks up with Connie, feeling that she deserves someone more mentally stable than himself. Connie, not used to being broken up with, gets upset, so Dr. Sturgis recommends that she go back to dating her ex-boyfriend, Ira Rosenbloom. During the date with Rosenbloom, Connie confesses that she only called him for a revenge date, and it was at Sturgis' suggestion. In response, Rosenbloom rejects future dates with Connie. Meanwhile, Sheldon feels that it's unfair for him not to be friends with Dr. Sturgis just because Sturgis and Connie broke up and convinces Mary to invite Sturgis for dinner. Sturgis arrives at the Coopers' home bringing a pineapple as a gift, which he explains is a symbol of hospitality. Mary does not like the dinner table conversation that is taking place and asks George to take Dr. Sturgis to a bar. Dr. Sturgis publicly toasts "the bosom of the male friendship" that he thinks he has developed with George at the bar.
50	6	"A Parasol and a Hell of an Arm"	Chris Koch	Story by : Chuck Lorre & Eric Kaplan & Jeremy Howe; Teleplay by : Steven Molaro & Steve Holland & Connor Kilpatrick	November 7, 2019	T12.16456	8.83
The Coopers visit a church carnival, except for Connie, who stays at home struggling with her breakup with Dr. Sturgis. Georgie volunteered at a stall in the carnival expecting to be working together with Veronica. Still, she got sick, and he had to work with Peg, Pastor Jeff's chain-smoking secretary, who bores him with her stories of disappointments in her love life. Missy scores seven consecutive successful throws at the carnival dunk tank thanks to her baseball practices with her dad, which makes her want to join a baseball team. George takes Missy to sign up for the youth league, but the Coach, Dale, refuses to accept a girl in the team. When Connie hears about her rejection, she gets off the couch and visits Dale herself, along with Missy, who finally gets to show her skills and is accepted into the team; and Connie gets a date with the coach. Meanwhile, Georgie, bored out of his wits by Peg and Connie's lamentations, pays a visit to Veronica with a "Get Well Soon" balloon, but she is at the doctor's, and Georgie gets stuck with her grandmother, who bores him all over again.
51	7	"Pongo Pygmaeus and a Culture that Encourages Spitting"	Jaffar Mahmood	Story by : Chuck Lorre & Steven Molaro & Steve Holland; Teleplay by : Maria Ferrari & Tara Hernandez & Jeremy Howe	November 14, 2019	T12.16457	9.05
Sheldon buys a direct-connect 300 baud modem and uses it to post a wave function collapse theory on a physics newsgroup, which is met with disagreement from another user. Without the fear of physical retaliation, Sheldon resorts to name-calling. As the scientific argument escalates, Sheldon asks for advice from Dr. Sturgis, and eventually, his opponent concedes, remarking that Sheldon's point "has some validity." Dale takes George out for a beer, where they connect over small talk, but George does not tell him anything that would worry Connie, who is dating him. Other girls taunt Missy in her school for playing baseball, which makes Missy think of quitting baseball, but when Brenda Sparks calls Mary on the phone, calling Missy weird for playing baseball, Mary pressures Missy to stay on the team. Missy beats up a pitcher at a baseball match who tries to hit her with the ball. A girl from Georgie's English class named Lisa flirts with Georgie in school, producing mixed feelings in Veronica.
52	8	"The Sin of Greed and a Chimichanga from Chi-Chi's"	Chris Koch	Story by : Eric Kaplan & Maria Ferrari & Jeremy Howe; Teleplay by : Steven Molaro & Steve Holland & Connor Kilpatrick	November 21, 2019	T12.16458	8.38
When Sheldon scores exceptionally well on his college exam, Dr. Sturgis suggests to George that he transfer to college full-time, suggesting that George take a better-paying job coaching college football in order to be near him: George considers the offer, while Principal Petersen provides them with various perks in order to keep them at Medford High to ensure Sheldon's high scores keep the school well-funded. Dale offers Georgie a job as a salesman at his sporting goods store; Georgie's new cash flow quickly goes to his head. Mary is concerned at the apparent "selfishness" and "greed" running rampant in her family and confiscates all symbols of excess until Connie explains her frustrations as being a relapse of empty nest syndrome.
53	9	"A Party Invitation, Football Grapes and an Earth Chicken"	Jaffar Mahmood	Story by : Steven Molaro & Steve Holland & Tara Hernandez; Teleplay by : Eric Kaplan & Maria Ferrari & Jeremy Howe	December 5, 2019	T12.16459	8.39
When Missy receives an invitation to Billy's birthday party, but Sheldon does not, Mary pressures the Sparks family into inviting Sheldon, even getting Pastor Jeff to deliver a sermon on neighborliness. However, Sheldon will only attend as Mr. Spock, complete with tricorder. Dr. Sturgis eventually manages to establish a friendship with Connie and George. Billy's mother complains that Billy wants to spend time in the hen house with Sheldon instead of being at the party. Mary acknowledges that she made a mistake insisting Sheldon be included and explains to Brenda her worry about Sheldon not fitting in anywhere and her concern about what will happen when he grows up. This causes a rare moment of sympathy between the two moms as Brenda admits her worries about Billy. When Mary comments that this sort of thing bothers her far more than Sheldon, Brenda sympathetically agrees, saying, "Doesn't make it any easier, does it?" Although Brenda agrees to let Billy and Sheldon play with the chickens rather than rejoining the party, Sheldon immediately runs in screaming because a chicken pooped on him, causing Mary to take him home again.
54	10	"Teenager Soup and a Little Ball of Fib"	Nikki Lorre	Story by : Eric Kaplan & Maria Ferrari & Tara Hernandez; Teleplay by : Steven Molaro & Steve Holland & Connor Kilpatrick	December 12, 2019	T12.16460	8.21
Sheldon pretends to be sick to get out of taking a swimming class at school, but the guilt over the lie traumatizes him; he attempts to actually get sick before confessing to Mary, and in the end does get sick. He even infects his friends, classmates, teachers, principal, mom, dad, Missy, Georgie, Connie and Dale. Meanwhile, Dr. Sturgis spies on Dale, and Connie starts defending him once Dale begins to insult him.
55	11	"A Live Chicken, a Fried Chicken, and Holy Matrimony"	Alex Reid	Story by : Steven Molaro & Steve Holland & Yael Glouberman; Teleplay by : Maria Ferrari & Tara Hernandez & Jeremy Howe	January 9, 2020	T12.16461	7.57
Pastor Jeff and Officer Robin rush to get married so that they can commence marital relations: Pastor Jeff asks Mary to plan their wedding, but she gets carried away with wedding fever and breaks down over her lackluster marriage. George and Connie are left to look after the children. Sheldon finds that Georgie has taped Baywatch over one of his Star Trek: The Next Generation episodes, so he invites a stranger from an internet chat room to bring over his recording, much to Connie's dismay. Missy tries to save Billy's chicken from being eaten and stops George from eating his fried chicken. Georgie brings a girl, Jana (Ava Allan), into his bedroom, so George awkwardly tries to have "the talk" with him.
56	12	"Body Glitter and a Mall Safety Kit"	Lea Thompson	Story by : Steven Molaro & Steve Holland & Eric Kaplan; Teleplay by : Maria Ferrari & Tara Hernandez & Connor Kilpatrick	January 16, 2020	T12.16462	8.88
Paige's parents get a divorce, leading to Paige struggling in school. She begins acting rebellious, and Sheldon becomes concerned when Paige no longer wants to be smart. Dr. Sturgis advises Sheldon to listen to Paige, who admits to Sheldon that everyone she knows is acting "weird" and that she feels alone. Sheldon offers to make her a hot beverage (which becomes his go-to method for consoling others in the parent series). Meanwhile, George Sr. and Georgie clash when the latter tries to buy his way out of chores.
57	13	"Contracts, Rules and a Little Bit of Pig Brains"	Jaffar Mahmood	Story by : Chuck Lorre & Eric Kaplan & Maria Ferrari; Teleplay by : Steven Molaro & Steve Holland & Jeremy Howe	January 30, 2020	T12.16463	8.64
Dale invites George Sr. and Georgie on a fishing trip, and Dr. Sturgis tags along. The trip does not go well as Dale constantly insults Dr. Sturgis who then returns on his own. Connie visits the grave of her husband Charlie to reflect on her feelings for both men. Meanwhile, Missy and Sheldon play a bunch of games with the winner deciding what they should do that day. Missy eventually wins but their time is up, and Sheldon secretly got to enjoy arguing over the rules and staying home all day.
58	14	"A Slump, a Cross and Roadside Gravel"	Howie Deutch	Story by : Steven Molaro & Steve Holland & Connor Kilpatrick; Teleplay by : Eric Kaplan & Maria Ferrari & Tara Hernandez	February 6, 2020	T12.16464	8.98
Georgie enlists Sheldon in an attempt to get rich by extracting platinum from roadside gravel, but their attempt burns out a kiln at the school. Meanwhile, Missy falls into a batting slump. Mary tells her how God can provide support, but is later offended when Missy uses religion like a good luck charm.
59	15	"A Boyfriend's Ex-Wife and a Good Luck Head Rub"	Jaffar Mahmood	Story by : Steven Molaro & Steve Holland & Eric Kaplan; Teleplay by : Maria Ferrari & Tara Hernandez & Jeremy Howe	February 13, 2020	T12.16465	8.89
Connie meets Dale's ex-wife June and the two hit it off. Dr. Sturgis runs into them and June later tells him not to give up on Connie. Sheldon has to work on a group project with two college students and clashes with them at home, with his parents talking things over with his assignment partners. Meanwhile, Georgie takes Missy to the mall where she sees the boy she liked previously.
60	16	"Pasadena"	Jaffar Mahmood	Story by : Eric Kaplan & Maria Ferrari & Jeremy Howe; Teleplay by : Steven Molaro & Steve Holland & Tara Hernandez	February 20, 2020	T12.16466	9.11
Sheldon wants to go to Caltech for a Stephen Hawking lecture and brings George Sr. Sheldon has a panic attack on the plane, but his father calms him down by having him pretend to be Mr. Spock. Sheldon later says he could see a future in Pasadena. Mary catches Georgie in a lie by spying on his phone conversation with Jana, but is able to bond with him over her own teenage mistakes. The episode ends with Sheldon and his father admiring the cafeteria at Caltech, the venue for many scenes in the parent series, The Big Bang Theory.
61	17	"An Academic Crime and a More Romantic Taco Bell"	Melissa Joan Hart	Story by : Steven Molaro & Steve Holland & Maria Ferrari; Teleplay by : Tara Hernandez & Jeremy Howe & Connor Kilpatrick	March 5, 2020	T12.16467	8.55
Sheldon assists Dr. Sturgis with a paper about quantum time by correcting one of the equations, but when Dr. Sturgis tells Sheldon he'll be mentioned in the footnotes instead of being a co-author, Sheldon accuses him of plagiarism. This results in Dr. Sturgis banning Sheldon from his class. Georgie takes Jana out on a date, but runs into Veronica and his old feelings for her start to resurface. Meanwhile, Mary hunts for a female baseball trophy for Missy.
62	18	"A Couple Bruised Ribs and a Cereal Box Ghost Detector"	Chris Koch	Story by : Chuck Lorre & Eric Kaplan & Connor Kilpatrick; Teleplay by : Steven Molaro & Steve Holland & Maria Ferrari	March 12, 2020	T12.16468	8.88
After George Sr. accidentally injures the school librarian, Ms. Hutchins, she stays with the Cooper family. She makes Sheldon see he was wrong and he apologizes to Dr. Sturgis. Connie questions Georgie about Dale before she and Dale agree to a monogamous relationship. Georgie does not want a monogamous relationship with Jana so she dumps him.
63	19	"A House for Sale and Serious Woman Stuff"	Alex Reid	Story by : Steven Molaro & Steve Holland & Maria Ferrari; Teleplay by : Eric Kaplan & Tara Hernandez & Jeremy Howe	April 2, 2020	T12.16469	10.06
When Sheldon discovers the house next door is for sale, he decides the buyer must be one he approves. Pastor Jeff and Officer Robin express interest, and Sheldon likes the idea of having a police officer nearby, but Mary hesitates to have her boss live so close. She changes her mind to be a good neighbor. The couple buy the house, but Sheldon is less happy to hear they're expecting a baby. Meanwhile, Missy has to pitch against her "boyfriend" in a baseball game and is worried he'll dump her if she strikes him out. She eventually does, but he shows he still likes her and holds her hand, to Missy's great joy.
64	20	"A Baby Tooth and the Egyptian God of Knowledge"	Jaffar Mahmood	Story by : Eric Kaplan & Tara Hernandez & Jeremy Howe; Teleplay by : Steven Molaro & Steve Holland & Connor Kilpatrick	April 16, 2020	T12.16470	9.57
Under anesthesia at the dentist, Sheldon dreams he is given the solution to the unified field theory by the Egyptian deity Thoth, but upon waking he cannot remember it. A concentrated drink of Camomile tea makes him hallucinate that his wall posters of famous scientists are telling him the pursuit of scientific knowledge is more rewarding than just knowing the answers. Connie takes Dale to the casino. She turns down his suggestion they get married and is unwilling to say she loves him. He gets mighty upset. Georgie, put in charge of the store by Dale, returns from helping a customer to find an opened and emptied cash register drawer. Georgie repays Dale the loss from his savings but Dale angrily fires him.
65	21	"A Secret Letter and a Lowly Disc of Processed Meat"	Alex Reid	Story by : Steven Molaro & Steve Holland & Connor Kilpatrick; Teleplay by : Maria Ferrari & Tara Hernandez & Jeremy Howe	April 30, 2020	T12.16471	10.14
Sheldon and George are angry at Mary having hidden from them that Caltech wrote to Sheldon that they wanted him to study there. Mary discloses there have been other letters from other institutions. Mary can bond with Brenda Sparks about her fears for Sheldon's future. George convinces Sheldon that studying far away at present is an unrealistic option, but helps him with a videotape presentation to convince Mary to allow Sheldon to enroll full-time with Dr. Sturgis, with support from Dr. Sturgis and the high school staff; Mary agrees. Meanwhile, Connie is furious that Dale fired Georgie so they take revenge by egging his store.

=== Season 4 (2020–2021) ===
No. overall	No. in season	Title	Directed by	Written by	Original release date	Prod. code	U.S. viewers (millions)
66	1	"Graduation"	Jaffar Mahmood	Story by : Eric Kaplan & Jeremy Howe & Connor Kilpatrick; Teleplay by : Steven Molaro & Steve Holland & Tara Hernandez	November 5, 2020	T12.16751	6.77
Dale tries making up with Connie after their breakup and apologizes for firing Georgie; he later reinstates Georgie and gives back the money Georgie gave him after Dale's store was burglarized. Sheldon's friend Tam shows indifference about Sheldon graduating. Sheldon learns he will be valedictorian of his graduating class, but later panics when unable to find his goggles at school, fearing he will catch "eyebrow lice." Sheldon is interviewed on local television and succumbs to his fear that he is unable to handle things on his own. George tries to convince Sheldon he is ready for college, while Mary seems glad Sheldon might stay in high school. Missy, facing elementary school graduation, admits to Sheldon that she is also afraid but tells him they should face their graduations despite the fear. Sheldon gives a poignant graduation speech, crediting Missy, who graduates soon after. In the present day, Sheldon narrates that the twins' graduation party was the best he ever attended until he held one for his son Leonard. It is presumed that Leonard was named after Sheldon's adulthood roommate Leonard Hofstadter until Sheldon mentions he was originally going to be named Leonard Nimoy Cooper. Sheldon's wife and Leonard's mother Amy Farrah Fowler is then heard telling Sheldon he should "be happy I let you name him Leonard."
67	2	"A Docent, A Little Lady and a Bouncer Named Dalton"	Alex Reid	Story by : Steven Molaro & Steve Holland & Tara Hernandez; Teleplay by : Maria Ferrari & Jeremy Howe & Connor Kilpatrick	November 12, 2020	T12.16752	7.40
Sheldon gets a volunteer position as a docent (or a guide) for a railway museum but is removed from the position after continually correcting the man who selected him. Connie tries to teach Sheldon that people can get tired of hearing a barrage of facts by telling him about knitting; Sheldon continues being interested after Connie becomes tired of explaining it. While George is driving Missy to one of her baseball games, Missy uses a restroom and has her first period, and George freaks out. However, he is assisted by a female clerk who empathizes with his situation. He later cheers Missy on as she strikes out an opposing batter. Meanwhile, Georgie walks in on Mary watching Road House, which she pretends she turned on by accident. They both admit they've seen the movie several times, even though it's rated R. George then ruins Road House for Mary after pointing out Patrick Swayze's resemblance to Georgie.
68	3	"Training Wheels and an Unleashed Chicken"	Jeremy Howe	Story by : Maria Ferrari & Tara Hernandez & Connor Kilpatrick; Teleplay by : Steven Molaro & Steve Holland & Eric Kaplan	November 19, 2020	T12.16753	7.30
Concerned he cannot walk fast enough to get from class to class at college, Sheldon gets Missy to teach him how to ride a bicycle without using training wheels. However, one of the Sparks' family chickens flies out, and the bicycling Sheldon crashes into a mailbox. His father George rushes him to the emergency room, where Sheldon's fractured right ulna is found. Brenda Sparks, concerned about getting sued, brings a peace offering--the offending chicken cooked. Sheldon asks Georgie about being left-handed, then is "babied" by his mother, Mary, and has a dream his mother is his training wheels. Connie tells her daughter Mary that if a parent does their job right, their children no longer need them. Missy inspires Sheldon to succeed despite his "handicap" and points to the great physicist Stephen Hawking, who uses a wheelchair. Despite Pastor Jeff's efforts, Sheldon credits Hawking instead of God. Sheldon lets people sign his cast for a memory of his maturing. His arm heals, and the cast is removed. With Missy's encouragement, he again rides a bicycle without training wheels, but a dog chases him for 11 miles.
69	4	"Bible Camp and a Chariot of Love"	Jaffar Mahmood	Story by : Steven Molaro & Steve Holland & Jeremy Howe; Teleplay by : Maria Ferrari & Tara Hernandez & Connor Kilpatrick	December 3, 2020	T12.16754	7.57
After Sheldon's Stamp Camp is canceled due to a lack of interest, his mother forces him to attend Bible Camp with Missy. Paige is also there, after her mother caught her smoking. Despite both mocking religion, Sheldon and Paige soon get competitive over Bible trivia. Sheldon studies all night to be more prepared than Paige, but she finds it more fun not to compete and watch Sheldon squirm. Sheldon tries various other ways to annoy her, which have no effect. When Sheldon points out how she must blame herself for her parents' divorce, she gives him a black eye. Meanwhile, Georgie buys his first vehicle but chooses a van with a mini-fridge and bed to invite his girlfriend Jana inside. George bans him from the house to get him to sell it. Georgie lives inside the van despite being attacked by a rat. However, he does agree to sell it once Jana's father sees the bed and refuses to let his daughter go for a ride in the van.
70	5	"A Musty Crypt and a Stick to Pee On"	Alex Reid	Story by : Tara Hernandez & Jeremy Howe & Connor Kilpatrick; Teleplay by : Steven Molaro & Steve Holland & Eric Kaplan	December 17, 2020	T12.16755	6.86
George is going to a conference with Coach Wilkins, and Mary joins in when she learns Coach Wilkins is bringing his wife, Darlene. While George and Mary bicker, the other couple is happy and supportive of each other. With encouragement, George and Mary express mutual appreciation of each other. Connie and Dale play Dungeons & Dragons with Sheldon and Missy; Connie reveals she is tired of Dale's trying to be kind, thinking it's just an act. Dale reveals he is still upset about Connie rejecting his marriage proposal. Connie remains unwilling to get married but admits she liked the old Dale more, so Dale reverts to his sarcastic, drinking ways. Meanwhile, Georgie's girlfriend Jana thinks she is pregnant. While waiting for her to take a test, Georgie imagines what his life would be like with children. Jana is not pregnant but tells Georgie he was afraid he would have to marry her.
71	6	"Freshman Orientation and the Inventor of the Zipper"	Jaffar Mahmood	Story by : Steve Holland & Eric Kaplan & Tara Hernandez; Teleplay by : Steven Molaro & Jeremy Howe & Connor Kilpatrick	January 21, 2021	T12.16756	7.38
Sheldon is about to begin college and attend his freshman orientation. Dr. Sturgis calls to say he took a new job at the Superconducting Super Collider. Mary is worried about how Sheldon will handle college without a trusted adult there, but Sheldon insists he navigates his first day. Sheldon gets a smoothie spilled on him, a bee stings his eye, his zipper is stuck, causing his pants to rip, and he gets a roll of duct tape stuck to himself trying to fix the rip. But he does make it to the orientation. Mary runs into Sam; a student Sheldon has worked with previously. Other students mistake Mary for a new student, and Mary enjoys herself at a barbecue with them. George helps Pastor Jeff build a nursery, and they discuss how life changes when you become a father. Both of them become depressed, but they both cheer up when George takes Pastor Jeff for a ride on his long-unridden motorcycle. Meanwhile, Connie is upset Dr. Sturgis never told her he was moving away for his new job. She hints at her feelings while helping Missy, who now wants to be called by her given name, Melissa, with her hair. But Connie is pleased when she gets a letter from Dr. Sturgis.
72	7	"A Philosophy Class and Worms That Can Chase You"	Alex Reid	Story by : Tara Hernandez & Jeremy Howe & Connor Kilpatrick; Teleplay by : Steven Molaro & Steve Holland & Eric Kaplan	February 11, 2021	T12.16757	7.59
Sheldon begins a philosophy class with Professor Erikson (Melanie Lynskey), who questions how anything can be truly proven and the value of science compared with skepticism. Talking with Dr. Linkletter, Sheldon decides to drop the class; but Professor Erikson says he is giving up. Sheldon spends the night studying science and the logical structure of the world and dreams, talking things over with René Descartes. However, his dream turns into a nightmare where he is a butterfly killed by his sister. Sheldon has an existential crisis in the morning and unwilling to go to school because nothing matters; Mary is alarmed. Meanwhile, Mary and Brenda Sparks reveal that Missy may become popular in middle school.
73	8	"An Existential Crisis and a Bear That Makes Bubbles"	Alex Reid	Story by : Steven Molaro & Eric Kaplan & Tara Hernandez; Teleplay by : Steve Holland & Jeremy Howe & Connor Kilpatrick	February 18, 2021	T12.16758	7.72
With Sheldon still doubting reality, George, Connie, and Dr. Sturgis fail to rouse him and Connie resorts to scaring him with a chicken. At the university, Sheldon questions his physics class with Dr. Linkletter. As Connie and Dr. Linkletter both demand Professor Erikson fix Sheldon, she tells Sheldon that asking philosophical questions to gain knowledge is the point of life. Sheldon decides to drop physics for philosophy and begins practicing the various branches. He goes to Dr. Linkletter to change his field of study. As Dr. Linkletter tries to warn him about switching fields while on a scholarship, Sheldon blows some bubbles, which causes him to think about science again and no longer want to switch fields. Meanwhile, George finds out Georgie is cutting class and wants to leave the football team, preferring to work at the store; he claims he is happy there while George hates his job. George reveals to his coworkers his unhappiness anywhere.
74	9	"Crappy Frozen Ice Cream and an Organ Grinder's Monkey"	Michael Judd	Story by : Steve Holland & Tara Hernandez & Yael Glouberman; Teleplay by : Steven Molaro & Connor Kilpatrick & Marie Cheng	February 25, 2021	T12.16759	7.87
The college president pressures Sheldon and George into attending a dinner with a wealthy benefactor. George has Sheldon practice being nice with Billy Sparks when someone says something Sheldon finds stupid. Sheldon does manage to shake the donor's hand but finds it difficult to listen to his beliefs in fringe science, finally snapping that people pretend to agree with him for his money. The donor appreciates Sheldon's honesty, giving a large donation to the college while George gets football tickets and Sheldon receives an anti-static lab chair. Connie attends the second wedding of Dale's son. Dale's ex-wife June is there with a much younger man, admitting she is dating him to upset Dale, angering Connie. Meanwhile, Missy wants to go to a school dance, but Mary forbids it due to their religion. Georgie showing Missy Footloose is unhelpful, but Georgie tells Mary she should lighten up and be glad Missy still respects her enough to ask. Mary allows her to go, not knowing Missy is about to sneak out.
75	10	"Cowboy Aerobics and 473 Grease-Free Bolts"	Melissa Joan Hart	Story by : Eric Kaplan & Jeremy Howe & Connor Kilpatrick; Teleplay by : Steven Molaro & Steve Holland & Yael Glouberman	March 4, 2021	T12.16760	7.71
Sheldon relentlessly begs Dr. Linkletter to be his lab assistant, finally getting the job by calling in the middle of the night. Sheldon is insulted that it is only menial tasks in the lab and quits, but George demands Sheldon stick to his word. Sheldon returns and does the tasks and respects the boundaries, not letting Dr. Linkletter know about the flaw in his experiment. Dr. Linkletter tries various methods to get Sheldon to tell him, even calling George in the middle of the night, but Sheldon is unbroken. Dr. Linkletter runs the experiment anyway and accidentally starts a small fire. After realizing how much money Richard Simmons makes, Georgie decides to make his exercise video, turning to the drama teacher Mr. Lundy (Jason Alexander), for help. Mr. Lundy turns it into a cowboy aerobics theme, and Georgie convinces Connie to invest in him as her grandson. However, Connie and Georgie back out when Mr. Lundy wants 80% of the profits. Mr. Lundy carries on with the idea, launching successful videos starring David Hasselhoff. However, Mr. Lundy loses all the money by creating a play based on his life.
76	11	"A Pager, a Club and a Cranky Bag of Wrinkles"	Jaffar Mahmood	Story by : Steven Molaro & Steve Holland & Eric Kaplan; Teleplay by : Tara Hernandez & Jeremy Howe & Connor Kilpatrick	March 11, 2021	T12.16761	6.49
Sheldon constantly eats lunch with Dr. Linkletter. Mary and Dr. Linkletter both encourage Sheldon to join a school club, but Sheldon finds a flaw in them all. He goes back to Dr. Linkletter, who tells Sheldon that they are not friends, only professor, and student. Sheldon is hurt and tries to set up a Professor Proton club. Nobody shows up, but Sheldon silently reads with another student in the room doing the same. June calls Connie to apologize for what happened at the wedding earlier, and the two go to a casino and get drunk together. June believes Connie regrets rejecting Dale's marriage proposal. Connie later calls Dale drunk that night but cannot remember what she said. Meanwhile, Georgie gets a pager for work, but an older woman mistakenly contacts him. To his annoyance, he does various errands and chores for her, but he then meets and has a crush on her granddaughter.
77	12	"A Box of Treasure and the Meemaw of Science"	Alex Reid	Story by : Steve Holland & Tara Hernandez & Marie Cheng; Teleplay by : Steven Molaro & Jeremy Howe & Connor Kilpatrick	April 1, 2021	T12.16762	6.64
Sheldon and Dr. Linkletter need Connie's crochet skills to help solve the solar neutrino problem. Connie gets excited about contributing to science, calling Dr. Sturgis to brag and dreaming she wins an award as the 'Meemaw of Science.' The experiment works, but Connie is disappointed to learn that it is just an early prototype, and the actual breakthrough will take decades. Mary spots Pastor Jeff walking around the neighborhood with Brenda Sparks, which makes her jealous. Though not invited to join them, Brenda eventually admits her husband moved out, willing to talk about it with Mary. Meanwhile, Georgie finds Sheldon's old perfectly scored high school tests. With the teachers still using the same ones, he sells the tests to other students for cash. While sneaking into the photocopy room to make more, he sees Mr. Givens, the science teacher making out with the librarian Ms. Hutchins. When Mr. Givens confronts him about the tests, Georgie agrees to stay quiet about what he saw if Mr. Givens stays quiet about the tests.
78	13	"The Geezer Bus and a New Model for Education"	Melissa Joan Hart	Story by : Steven Molaro & Connor Kilpatrick & Yael Glouberman; Teleplay by : Steve Holland & Eric Kaplan & Tara Hernandez	April 8, 2021	T12.16763	6.95
While bringing Sheldon home from college, Connie swerves to avoid hitting a cat and crashes her car into a tree. Though both of them are fine, Missy plans on using the car accident story to get better treatment from her teachers. Sheldon becomes afraid of being a passenger in any car and asks Dr. Linkletter to deliver his class lectures over the phone. When Dr. Linkletter refuses, Sheldon goes to President Hagemeyer to get Dr. Linkletter to comply. Wanting to keep Sheldon happy, President Hagemeyer has a second phone line installed at Sheldon's house, amongst other perks. Mary thanks President Hagemeyer for supporting Sheldon but has her stop giving him everything he wants. When Mary eventually gets Sheldon into a car to go to RadioShack, he creates the alphabetic periodic table element car game he plays as an adult with his roommate Leonard. Meanwhile, Connie is forced to use the church transportation service with other seniors with her car in the shop. She takes them all to a salon and shows them they can still be bold and enjoy life.
79	14	"Mitch's Son and the Unconditional Approval of a Government Agency"	Alex Reid	Story by : Eric Kaplan & Tara Hernandez & Jeremy Howe; Teleplay by : Steven Molaro & Steve Holland & Connor Kilpatrick	April 15, 2021	T12.16764	7.46
The IRS charges the Cooper family $4.22 for a mistake on their tax returns. Wanting to prove he does the family's taxes perfectly, Sheldon calls them to explain how he was correct, and they made a mistake. The IRS responds by auditing them for the three years Sheldon has done the taxes. Sheldon can explain everything perfectly, but the accountant gets him to admit George buys him a model train for completing the taxes, a violation of accepting payment for unlicensed work. Sheldon is crushed; he made a mistake, but a pep talk from George teaches him that mistakes are how one learns and does not give up. Sheldon realizes since George is a teacher, doing the taxes counts as an economics lesson and the model trains are an acceptable gift for this, so the family's taxes are fine. Dale must get a colonoscopy and wants Connie to get one. She refuses, avoiding doctors since her husband was in surgery and died nine months after a similar appointment. Connie eventually gets a check-up and is healthy but must also get her colonoscopy. Meanwhile, Missy almost swears by saying phrases like "son of a Mitch," which annoys Mary. Missy further gets under Mary's skin by reading about "asses" in The Bible, and Mary grounds Missy for it.
80	15	"A Virus, Heartbreak and a World of Possibilities"	Michael Judd	Story by : Steven Molaro & Steve Holland & Connor Kilpatrick; Teleplay by : Eric Kaplan & Tara Hernandez & Jeremy Howe	April 22, 2021	T12.16765	7.01
Sheldon wants an expensive computer game, so Tam offers to get him a bootleg copy. Mary offers to take Brenda Sparks out for a night of fun, going with Connie to a bar. With Billy Sparks at the Cooper house, he plays poker with George, Coach Wilkins, Mr. Givens, and Principal Petersen. Meanwhile, Georgie and Jana take Missy to the movies for a date with Marcus. A virus wipes Sheldon's computer, and he realizes his backup disc is also corrupted, and the files are gone forever. Brenda enjoys her time out, but her story of how her marriage fell apart worries Mary about her marriage. George tries to cheer up Billy, saying his parents were unhappy staying together. Jana is upset Georgie responded to her saying she loved him with "Samesies," but Georgie admits he cares about her more than anyone else. Sheldon unknowingly and unintentionally hurts Billy with an ironic comment about his erased files never coming back, as may be the case with Billy's father. The episode ends with Sheldon, Mary and Billy upset about their problems; but Jana and Georgie are happy again, and Missy gets her first kiss on the cheek from Marcus.
81	16	"A Second Prodigy and the Hottest Tips for Pouty Lips"	Melissa Joan Hart	Story by : Steve Holland & Tara Hernandez & Jeremy Howe; Teleplay by : Steven Molaro & Connor Kilpatrick & Marie Cheng	April 29, 2021	T12.16766	7.34
President Hagemeyer wants Sheldon's help recruiting Paige for the university. Sheldon tries to talk her out of enrolling. Still, she is not interested, only taking the tour to please her mother, wanting to go to Columbia or Harvard instead. This aggravates Sheldon, who does not like her criticizing his school and implying he only went there to stay with his mother. Missy believes Sheldon has a crush on Paige, and he has all the signs of a crush in her magazine's quiz. Talking with Dr. Sturgis, Sheldon realizes he probably does have a crush. He tells Paige, who claims she also has a crush on him. However, she gets him to close his eyes for a kiss and instead draws a mustache on Sheldon's face. Sheldon decides he does not have a crush. Mary sees Brenda Sparks' new haircut; feeling unsupported by George and lacking her own identity, Mary goes to June's salon. She instead decides to make her family's clothes, though George is upset about the cost of the fabrics. Mary gets a haircut after getting her hair caught in her sewing machine.
82	17	"A Black Hole"	Jaffar Mahmood	Story by : Steve Holland & Jeremy Howe & Connor Kilpatrick; Teleplay by : Steven Molaro & Eric Kaplan & Tara Hernandez	May 6, 2021	T12.16767	6.64
Dr. Sturgis returns to town after being fired from the SSC project because he inadvertently caused public concern about the safety of high-energy particle collision experiments. He does not want his old job back, starting over at the grocery instead. Invited to the Cooper household for dinner, they all discuss various possibilities: the black hole occurring and everyone saying goodbye to each other as the world ends; an alternate universe where Dr. Sturgis is a cowboy, Connie is a New Yorker, George is a pastor, Mary is a sultry woman, Georgie is bald, Missy is the genius and Sheldon is a normal kid; and the possibility of two Sheldons which Missy imagines attacking each other. Dr. Sturgis imagines telling Connie he would want to live in a universe where they never broke up but remains quiet in real life, even as Connie admits she worries about him sometimes. While narrating, the older Sheldon reflects on this dinner when he bonded with his whole family discussing science, including his father. Later, Georgie tries to buy beer at the grocery store with Dr. Sturgis vouching for him but just leaves annoyed when Dr. Sturgis accidentally knocks over a display of cans.
83	18	"The Wild and Woolly World of Nonlinear Dynamics"	Alex Reid	Story by : Eric Kaplan & Tara Hernandez & Jeremy Howe; Teleplay by : Steven Molaro & Steve Holland & Connor Kilpatrick	May 13, 2021	T12.16768	7.21
Mary volunteers to work late at the church with Peg so Pastor Jeff can spend time with his newborn son. Peg gets under Mary's skin by not contributing and saying Mary always wants to be right. Missy comes home upset about Marcus, trying to shut everyone out. George's attempts to make her feel better fail and lead to George and Connie bickering. After Sheldon acts insensitive, she rips his Professor Proton picture. This leads to tensions between George and Sheldon. Mary comes home in a bad mood, and without knowing the whole story, grounds Missy; leaving Missy furious that her mother always sides with Sheldon and George angry that Mary does not respect his parenting. Sheldon talks with Connie, who tells Sheldon he must look out for his sister. Georgie comes home, accidentally worsening the fight between his parents when George says Mary does not realize he is unhappy in his career and life because she did not care to ask. Sheldon catches Missy running away, so he follows her as her brother. They go to a shack in the woods where Missy explains Marcus broke her heart by holding hands with a 7th grader named Nicole at the roller rink, and Sheldon comforts her. Mary admits to Georgie that George may have a point. At a bar, George meets Brenda Sparks and begins playing pool.

=== Season 5 (2021–2022) ===
No. overall	No. in season	Title	Directed by	Written by	Original release date	Prod. code	U.S. viewers (millions)
84	1	"One Bad Night and Chaos of Selfish Desires"	Alex Reid	Story by : Steve Holland & Eric Kaplan & Nick Bakay; Teleplay by : Steven Molaro & Jeremy Howe & Connor Kilpatrick	October 7, 2021	T12.17201	7.12
Picking up with George and Brenda at the bar, they enjoy talking but when Brenda invites him to her place, George has another mild heart attack. Mary is grateful to Brenda for helping George. Georgie finds Sheldon and Missy in the woods and brings them home. George convinces Mary to put their argument behind them and Missy apologizes to her father for how she treated him earlier. George is feeling guilty about what almost happened with Brenda, and is made more uncomfortable when Pastor Jeff praises him as a family man and husband, Sheldon points out that he and Missy got off without punishment, and Missy says she cannot believe Marcus thought she would not find out he held hands with another girl. After Brenda avoids Mary's thank-you dinner, George and Brenda both admit they feel guilty but talking with each other made both of them feel good. Mary finds comfort in religion, Sheldon in Star Trek and Missy in burning her notebook with Marcus's name on the cover.
85	2	"Snoopin' Around and the Wonder Twins of Atheism"	Michael Judd	Story by : Steven Molaro & Jeremy Howe & Nadiya Chettiar; Teleplay by : Steve Holland & Connor Kilpatrick & Marie Cheng	October 14, 2021	T12.17202	6.54
Connie gets suspicious when she runs into Brenda at the grocery store, and Brenda acts strangely about the night at the bar. Connie confronts George, who reveals nothing, and warns Brenda. Connie then asks the bartender, who also tells Connie nothing and informs George. George confronts Connie for her snooping and insists nothing happened. Connie apologizes and says she believes him but is still suspicious. Brenda and George agree not to go to the bar simultaneously and bond again while talking. George successfully hides from Billy as well. Meanwhile, Pastor Jeff hires someone to teach the youth, Pastor Rob, who bothers Mary with his unconventional thinking around religion. Missy questions whether she believes in God; talking with Georgie is helpful, and she considers joining Sheldon in atheism. Pastor Rob tells Missy it is alright to have questions, and he wants her to figure out her own. This impresses both Missy and Sheldon, leaving Mary flabbergasted.
86	3	"Potential Energy and Hooch on a Park Bench"	Nikki Lorre	Story by : Steve Holland & Marie Cheng & Yael Glouberman; Teleplay by : Steven Molaro & Eric Kaplan & Nick Bakay	October 21, 2021	T12.17203	6.36
After learning Dale dropped out of high school, Georgie does the same to work full-time. George and Mary are furious, and George kicks Georgie out of the house over Mary's protests. Jana also breaks up with Georgie for being a dropout. Both Mary and George argue with Dale, who will not talk Georgie out of it, and Connie agrees that school is not the best environment for Georgie's talents. Connie agrees to let Georgie stay one night. To not upset Georgie's parents more, Dale will not give him full-time hours, so Georgie needs to get a second job. Meanwhile, Dr. Linkletter tries to get Dr. Sturgis to return to the university. Dr. Linkletter sees Dr. Sturgis is happy at the grocery store and may point out their careers, getting them nowhere. They get drunk and sing in a park together. Dr. Sturgis goes to Connie's, while Dr. Linkletter falls asleep on a bench and is awoken by a policeman.
87	4	"Pish Posh and a Secret Back Room"	Alex Reid	Story by : Steven Molaro & Nick Bakay & Nadiya Chettiar; Teleplay by : Steve Holland & Jeremy Howe & Connor Kilpatrick	October 28, 2021	T12.17204	7.23
Georgie compromises with his parents by moving into the garage and paying rent. Missy takes the opportunity to move into Georgie's old room, and Sheldon struggles with the changes. He and Missy pester each other, but she does allow Sheldon to sleep on her floor the first night. They later establish a communication system for their separate rooms with walkie-talkies. Connie buys the laundromat that has secret illegal casino slots in the back. Dale does not love the idea and talks with his friend Officer Jake (Bill Fagerbakke), who says the police usually look the other way in these back rooms. Connie's first day dealing with the laundry side of the business does not go well, and Jake shuts down the casino to help his chances of becoming Sheriff. He does not arrest Connie as a favor to Dale, though. Connie is sad but still wants to run a gaming room.
88	5	"Stuffed Animals and A Sweet Southern Syzygy"	Jeremy Howe	Story by : Steve Holland & Eric Kaplan & Connor Kilpatrick; Teleplay by : Steven Molaro & Nadiya Chettiar & Yael Glouberman	November 4, 2021	T12.17205	7.12
With Mary away, Billy Sparks asks George's permission to ask out Missy. George tells him to think about it first. Sheldon knows he and Dr. Linkletter need Dr. Sturgis' help on a science problem, but the two are professional rivals. George advises Sheldon that they are all scientists working for one goal. Dr. Linkletter and Sturgis insult each other at their first meeting. Missy is shocked and embarrassed at what George said and turns Billy down. George cheers Billy up, and Dr. Linkletter and Sturgis make progress later. Sheldon never tells George this, and Missy is unwilling to hear how George talked to Billy again. The older Sheldon narrates that while George may not have been the best father, they may not be the best children either. Meanwhile, Connie wants Georgie to work for her at the laundromat. Georgie refuses but suggests having people play the slots for tickets they can exchange for non-monetary prizes; Connie can then buy back at whatever value she wants, rewarding those who win at the slots and be legal. Connie thinks it's a stupid idea until Dale agrees. Connie apologizes and goes to talk with Georgie.
89	6	"Money Laundering and a Cascade of Hormones"	Nikki Lorre	Story by : Steven Molaro & Eric Kaplan & Jeremy Howe; Teleplay by : Steve Holland & Nick Bakay & Marie Cheng	November 11, 2021	T12.17206	7.04
Missy's questions about sex and relationships at Sunday School cause Pastor Rob to ask that the church talk to the children. Mary's attempt with Missy at home does not go well. Pastor Rob can convince Mary giving the talk as a pair would be a good idea. Mary later has a sexy dream about Pastor Rob. Angry calls from parents get Pastor Jeff to cancel the talk. Missy is further upset when she is made fun of at school for starting this. Sheldon is baffled people are so uncomfortable with the topic of reproduction; talking about it with Dr. Sturgis at the grocery store gets Dr. Sturgis fired. Sheldon later chooses the term "coitus" as the blandest term for sex. Missy also dreams about marrying Pastor Rob. Meanwhile, Georgie helps get Connie's casino running by using teddy bear prizes in exchange for cash, but she later cuts Georgie out. To Connie's chagrin, Officer Jake has Connie give the police department 10% of her earnings since it is a legal gray area.
90	7	"An Introduction to Engineering and a Glob of Hair Gel"	Jaffar Mahmood	Story by : Steve Holland & Nick Bakay & Yael Glouberman; Teleplay by : Steven Molaro & Jeremy Howe & Connor Kilpatrick	November 18, 2021	T12.17207	6.95
Sheldon begins his first engineering class with Professor Boucher (Lance Reddick). Initially, Sheldon likes Professor Boucher's no-nonsense teaching style, but then he instantly rips up Sheldon's bridge-building assignment. Repeated attempts by Sheldon to fix it end in the same result. Sheldon going to President Hagemeyer doesn't help, as Professor Boucher has tenure. Sheldon has George talk to him, but Professor Boucher can prove that being hard on Sheldon will prepare him for the real world. Sheldon eventually realizes that though his math is perfect, he's not accounting for real-world factors such as wind. He is excited to show Professor Boucher but gets locked out of class for being late. The older Sheldon narrates this was the start of his hatred of engineering, shocking his engineer friend Howard Wolowitz, who was telling the story alongside Sheldon. President Hagemayer and Professor Boucher later revel in Sheldon's reaction to being locked out. Meanwhile, June has a knee injury, and Dale and Connie agree to help her. Connie is upset June had Dale help shower her, though June apologizes and says Connie has nothing to worry about. They later both agree they put work in to make Dale a better partner in a relationship.
91	8	"The Grand Chancellor and a Den of Sin"	Alex Reid	Story by : Steven Molaro & Nick Bakay & Connor Kilpatrick; Teleplay by : Steve Holland & Eric Kaplan & Nadiya Chettiar	December 2, 2021	T12.17208	6.59
Sheldon is upset that the university is reducing science requirements for the general student population, President Hagemeyer blaming it on a "grand chancellor" to secretly get Sheldon to drop the matter. After being told by the campus newspaper that there is no such person, Sheldon goes back to President Hagemeyer, who won't reverse her decision; and Sheldon questions if everyone tells lies. Meanwhile, Mary finds out Georgie is working for Connie's gambling room. Connie sees nothing wrong with it, and Georgie refuses to quit. Pastor Jeff slightly calms Mary by saying all teenagers rebel. As Mary prays, feeling like a failing mother, Sheldon comforts her, and Mary convinces Sheldon that not everyone lies. George secretly goes to the gambling room and is fine with Georgie working there, as long as he doesn't tell Mary that George also plays the slots.
92	9	"The Yips and an Oddly Hypnotic Bohemian"	Kabir Akhtar	Story by : Jeremy Howe & Marie Cheng & Ben Slaughter; Teleplay by : Nick Bakay & Yael Glouberman & Alex Ayers	December 9, 2021	T12.17209	6.96
Missy ends up with the yips, getting in her head too much and ruining her pitching game. Sheldon gets the yips on one easy question in his midterm test. Talking with George and Georgie doesn't help, as he cannot figure it out while redoing the test. Sheldon finds Bob Ross painting on television, calming him. The test goes perfectly on his third attempt, much to Sheldon and Dr. Linkletter's relief. Dale can cure Missy's yips by insulting her for being a girl, making Missy angry, and restoring her pitching skill. Meanwhile, George fixes things around Brenda Sparks' house, encouraged by Mary. Both George and Brenda try to be nice to each other though George worries they might be starting to cross the line again. Talking with Principal Petersen at the bar, George considers setting him up with Brenda.
93	10	"An Expensive Glitch and a Goof-Off Room"	Melissa Joan Hart	Story by : Steve Holland & Eric Kaplan & Jeremy Howe; Teleplay by : Steven Molaro & Nadiya Chettiar & Connor Kilpatrick	January 6, 2022	T12.17210	7.39
Due to a four-hour gap between his classes, Sheldon is given his private dorm room. Running into fellow student Sam, she says he gets undeserved special treatment, and nobody likes him because of his arrogance. Talking with Dr. Sturgis about humans being social creatures and judging his personal ways, Sheldon decides to experiment to see if people will like him more. After letting Sam use the room to study, word spreads Sheldon has a free room. He allows couples to use it to study, unaware of why they want it. When his parents find out, they tell him people are using it to waste time, convincing Sheldon to stop lending it out. Meanwhile, a glitch in the slot machines lets June win $11,000. Unable to pay it, Connie is forced to let June become a partner in her casino business. June and Georgie support each other's ideas for the place. Connie tries to talk Georgie to her side, but he says Connie hates anything she doesn't think of herself. Georgie adds a small disco ball, further angering Connie.
94	11	"A Lock-In, a Weather Girl and a Disgusting Habit"	Alex Reid	Story by : Steven Molaro & Nick Bakay & Connor Kilpatrick; Teleplay by : Steve Holland & Jeremy Howe & Marie Cheng	January 13, 2022	T12.17211	7.70
Mary has Sheldon and Missy attend an overnight church lock-in. With Billy also attending, George feels nervous that he could meet Brenda without anyone knowing. Mary also tries to avoid being alone with Pastor Rob while chaperoning the event. George takes Principal Petersen out and runs into Brenda anyway. George awkwardly leaves. Mary and Pastor Rob bond while smoking cigarettes outside. George sees them together and leaves without Mary knowing he was there. Missy tricks Sheldon into hiding in a closet, and he falls asleep there. Georgie meets a woman, Mandy (Emily Osment), at the laundromat, who says she is 25. Claiming he is 21, he takes her on a date, which goes well. When Mandy reveals she is actually 29, Georgie keeps quiet about his own age.
95	12	"A Pink Cadillac and a Glorious Tribal Dance"	Beth McCarthy-Miller	Story by : Steve Holland & Nick Bakay & Yael Glouberman; Teleplay by : Steven Molaro & Eric Kaplan & Nadiya Chettiar	January 20, 2022	T12.17212	7.98
Mary runs into Mr. Lundy who has a pink Cadillac from selling Mary Kay makeup products. He talks Mary into selling for him. She initially gets one sale to the high school librarian Ms. Hutchins. Mr. Lundy talks Mary into selling to the women in her Bible Study group. Mary succeeds, but later has a guilt-ridden dream for doing so, and quits being a seller. Sheldon is on Spring Break from college when he hears about a three-day comic convention. Unable to get an adult to go with him, Sheldon decides to rebel and take a bus to the convention. Seeing someone from his local comic shop and his old science teacher Mr. Givens, they debate the merits of Lost in Space, Star Trek and The Next Generation. Sheldon enjoys the trip though he gets in trouble afterwards for sneaking out.
96	13	"A Lot of Band-Aids and the Cooper Surrender"	Jaffar Mahmood	Story by : Steven Molaro & Jeremy Howe & Marie Cheng; Teleplay by : Steve Holland & Nick Bakay & Connor Kilpatrick	January 27, 2022	T12.17213	7.73
Sheldon meets Oscar and Darren, undergrads in the dorm room next door to his. Finding they have many things in common like video games, Sheldon likes hanging out with them. Meanwhile, George's job is at risk due to parents who are unhappy with the football team's performance. George's meeting with them doesn't go well. A stressed-out George lets Sheldon stay overnight to play Dungeons & Dragons at the dorm without consulting Mary. Though annoyed, Mary is able to talk to George and give him a sincere hug when she learns what is bothering him. Mary later goes to get Sheldon herself, as he is about to vomit from too much candy and root beer. Also, after clothes shopping, Missy is made fun of at school and accidentally injures herself trying to shave her legs. Connie patches her up and promises to show her how to do it safely, cheering Missy up.
97	14	"A Free Scratcher and Feminine Wiles"	Michael Judd	Story by : Steve Holland & Eric Kaplan & Nadiya Chettiar; Teleplay by : Steven Molaro & Jeremy Howe & Connor Kilpatrick	February 24, 2022	T12.17214	6.95
Drs. Linkletter, Sturgis and Sheldon are constantly arguing over their project. Tired of being in the middle, President Hagemeyer brings in Dr. Carol Lee (Ming-Na Wen) to take charge. While both men fall in line, Sheldon is upset she isn't implementing any of his ideas. Dr. Lee bonds with President Hagemeyer about being women in male-dominated fields, while Sheldon's attempt to alter the project drastically backfires. Meanwhile, Mary is given a free lottery ticket but immediately throws it away; Missy finds it and begins scratching it before Mary confiscates it. She proceeds to finish it and ends up winning $500. Mary doesn't want to use it for anything fun or practical, hating gambling. Connie talks to her about putting a damper on things and growing apart from George, while George mentions to Principal Petersen that he saw Mary seem to be happier talking with Pastor Rob. George agrees to let Mary do what she sees fit. They buy a new dishwasher for the family, which everyone (except Missy) enjoys.
98	15	"A Lobster, an Armadillo and a Way Bigger Number"	Alex Reid	Story by : Steven Molaro & Nick Bakay & Jeremy Howe; Teleplay by : Steven Holland & Eric Kaplan & Marie Cheng	March 3, 2022	T12.17215	6.48
Sheldon and Drs. Sturgis and Linkletter go on a three-day road trip to a telescope near Fort Davis. On the way, Dr. Sturgis tries to drive and runs over an armadillo. Ending up in a biker bar, Sheldon is able to help his colleagues, though the armadillo dies. After burying it they drive on with mariachi music in tribute to the armadillo. Missy is annoyed Sheldon gets to do whatever he wants. George tries to take her to Red Lobster, but she doesn't want to be seen in there with him. Eating burgers and bonding later, George lets Missy drive in a parking lot. Meanwhile, Connie finds out Georgie is lying about his age to Mandy. Connie wants him to confess, but Dale admits he may have done the same at Georgie's age. Though he feels conflicted, Georgie keeps quiet while bringing Mandy back to his place in the garage.
99	16	"A Suitcase Full of Cash and a Yellow Clown Car"	Jaffar Mahmood	Story by : Steve Holland & Nadiya Chettiar & Connor Kilpatrick; Teleplay by : Steven Molaro & Nick Bakay & Yael Glouberman	March 10, 2022	T12.17216	6.79
Connie has a lot of money from her gaming room. Unable to put it in the bank, she gives a few hundred dollars to Sheldon and Missy. Sheldon buys three shares in Tandy Corporation, though his ideas for the business don't get very far. He later admits his idea was similar to the attempted Incredible Universe. Missy buys a cotton candy machine and Georgie tells her how to make a profit by selling the candy, though ants later ruin the machine. Dale suggests they take the rest of the money to retire and travel together, but Connie buys a yellow Mazda MX-5 sports car. Meanwhile, it appears George will be replaced as football coach. Sheldon's college no longer has a football team and no other coaching options are close to where the family lives. Dale offers to let George work in his store on a trial run, and may let George takeover the store eventually. With Connie unwilling to slow down in life, Dale breaks up with her.
100	17	"A Solo Peanut, a Social Butterfly and the Truth"	Alex Reid	Story by : Chuck Lorre & Jeremy Howe & Eric Kaplan; Teleplay by : Steven Molaro & Steve Holland & Connor Kilpatrick	March 31, 2022	T12.17217	6.93
Paige visits Sheldon's university, stunned that Sheldon has friends in Oscar and Darren, when she is lonely at her own school. She later returns and asks to hideout in Sheldon's dorm room, thinking of dropping out. Missy finds out and tells Mary. Paige is gone when they arrive but thanks Sheldon for helping her. She returns to her mother's house a few days later. Connie goes drinking with Mary, pretending she is fine with Dale dumping her. At the store, Dale annoys George by asking questions about Connie. Meanwhile, Georgie tells Mandy his true age and she throws him out. Mandy confronts Connie who in turn makes Georgie realize what he did was wrong. The older Sheldon narrates he realizes now parenting is hard as he raises his own children. Georgie goes to talk to Mandy again, who reveals she is pregnant.
101	18	"Babies, Lies and a Resplendent Cannoli"	Shiri Appleby	Story by : Steven Molaro & Nick Bakay & Connor Kilpatrick; Teleplay by : Steve Holland & Jeremy Howe & Marie Cheng	April 14, 2022	T12.17218	6.85
Sheldon is upset at the recent death of science-fiction author Isaac Asimov. Dr. Linkletter is a fan and Dr. Sturgis is interested in his novels. Since Sheldon's late grandfather enjoyed the novels as well, Sheldon talks Connie into joining his book club with the two professors to read "Nightfall". Once the two men find out Dale dumped Connie, they flirt with her and both leave her several voicemails. Meanwhile, Georgie tells Dale about Mandy being pregnant; Georgie is the father and Mandy wants to keep it. Dale later urges Georgie to tell George. Missy has her own disastrous experience babysitting Pastor Jeff's baby, alarming Georgie. In the garage, Georgie finally tells his father the truth.
102	19	"A God-Fearin' Baptist and a Hot Trophy Husband"	Alex Reid	Story by : Nick Bakay & Nadiya Chettiar & Yael Glouberman; Teleplay by : Chuck Lorre & Steven Molaro & Steve Holland	April 21, 2022	T12.17219	7.26
George is shocked and quickly has Georgie tell Mary. Though upset, Mary and George note they did the same when Mary got pregnant with Georgie. Mary informs Connie who is able to convince Mandy to come to dinner with the Coopers; relating how she felt back when Mary got pregnant. The dinner is awkward, with Mary wanting the baby to be raised Baptist and wanting Georgie and Mandy to get married. Mandy and George both think that is a horrible idea while Georgie would be willing to marry her. Mary and George get into an argument about their own marriage. Mandy is thankful for Connie's support though. Mandy later rebuffs Georgie's declaration of love for her. Meanwhile, the truth is hidden from Sheldon and Missy. When they are sent to Brenda Sparks for dinner, Missy and Sheldon start to think George could be dying or their parents could be getting divorced. They later mistakenly think Mary is pregnant.
103	20	"Uncle Sheldon and a Hormonal Firecracker"	Shiri Appleby	Story by : Steve Holland & Eric Kaplan & Jeremy Howe; Teleplay by : Steven Molaro & Nick Bakay & Connor Kilpatrick	April 28, 2022	T12.17220	6.91
Mary and George are still bickering. After Connie tells Sheldon and Missy that Mary isn't pregnant, Missy figures out the truth about Georgie. Mary swears the twins to secrecy. Talking about it without specifics, Mary later feels judged by Pastor Jeff. Sheldon cannot hold it and tells an uninterested Dr. Linkletter, George tells Coach Wilkins, Mary tells Pastor Rob and Missy tells a girl at school. Georgie is upset everyone spread it around and Mandy is further angry with him. Georgie has a heartfelt moment with Missy who believes Georgie will be a good father. George is further irritated Mary bonded with Pastor Rob again over this and listens to him when George had earlier given essentially the same advice; but doesn't tell her why he dislikes Pastor Rob. When nobody attends her Bible Study, a sad Mary calls Pastor Rob who says he always has time for her.
104	21	"White Trash, Holy Rollers and Punching People"	Jeremy Howe	Story by : Nick Bakay & Connor Kilpatrick & Marie Cheng; Teleplay by : Chuck Lorre & Steven Molaro & Steve Holland	May 12, 2022	T12.17221	6.93
After Missy punches a boy in Sunday school for making fun of her family, Pastor Jeff insists Mary take a leave of absence from working at the church to the objection of both George and Pastor Rob. At home, George disagrees with Mary that Missy should be punished. Pastor Rob stops by and prays with Mary, but Missy comes home interrupting their alone time. Mandy tells Connie her family has disowned her for being pregnant and invites her to accompany her to her medical examination. At the clinic, Georgie showed up despite being uninvited and after some bickering was allowed to stay, while Connie offers to cover the cost of Mandy's prenatal care. George is upset that Mary saw Pastor Rob again in private and storms out of the door. After Sheldon informs President Hagemeyer of his family troubles, Mary snaps at President Hagemeyer over the phone. Missy hugs and supports her mother, later covering for George's absence to her brothers and asking God to bless Mary.
105	22	"A Clogged Pore, a Little Spanish and the Future"	Alex Reid	Story by : Steve Holland & Eric Kaplan & Yael Glouberman; Teleplay by : Steven Molaro & Nick Bakay & Nadiya Chettiar	May 19, 2022	T12.17222	7.06
George finds out that the high school offered his job to Coach Wilkins and quits. Working part-time at Dale's store won't be enough, so George and Mary both hit the newspaper classifieds, with no luck. To George's discomfort, Mary later gets a job working with Brenda Sparks at the bowling alley. Georgie wants to make extra money because of the baby and decides to sell cigarettes in the gaming room. Connie tells him they are real cheap in Mexico and agrees to go with him. Connie later calls George to tell him that they got arrested at the border. Meanwhile, Sheldon gets his first pimple, alarming him about puberty and pending adulthood. When he asks President Hagemeyer and Dr. Linkletter for their advice, they are not helpful, and Sheldon later has a nightmare in which he becomes each of his parents and Connie and Georgie, who all seem unhappy. He wakes Missy who calms Sheldon with some wise advice, which inspires him to buy his first Flash graphic t-shirt. Meanwhile, at the house, Meemaw calls George and informs that she and Georgie have been arrested for smuggling 400 cartons of cigarettes.

=== Season 6 (2022–2023) ===
No. overall	No. in season	Title	Directed by	Written by	Original release date	Prod. code	U.S. viewers (millions)
106	1	"Four Hundred Cartons of Undeclared Cigarettes and a Niblingo"	Alex Reid	Story by : Chuck Lorre & Nick Bakay & Jeremy Howe; Teleplay by : Steven Molaro & Steve Holland & Connor Kilpatrick	September 29, 2022	T12.17701	6.88
Connie and Georgie are detained for trying to smuggle in 400 cartons of cigarettes. The fine to release them is $2,500. With Dale the only one having that kind of money, he and George go down to the border and bail them out. Dale reveals to George he was bluffing when he threatened to break up with Connie and wants her back. He merely irritates her on the way home. George is upset but knows Georgie was doing it for the baby and tells him that he was scared too when Georgie was born. Sheldon and Missy meet Mandy and tell her about the jail situation and Mary's struggles with the church congregation and losing her job. Mary and the twins attend church but Mary feels unwelcome and soon leaves. Sheldon gives an accurate but awkward speech about the congregation's hypocrisy. Mary later tells Pastor Jeff she feels as though God is walking away from her and shuts the door on Pastor Jeff.
107	2	"Future Worf and the Margarita of the South Pacific"	Beth McCarthy-Miller	Story by : Steve Holland & Nick Bakay & Yael Glouberman; Teleplay by : Steven Molaro & Eric Kaplan & Nadiya Chettiar	October 6, 2022	T12.17702	6.96
Missy decides to get a job to help with the family's money problems. She gets a job at Sheldon's favorite comic book shop using superhero knowledge she heard from Sheldon, much to his chagrin. Sheldon tries pitching ideas for Star Trek episodes to his friends and family, and later the idea for cryptocurrency, but doesn't get far. Mary starts working at the bowling alley despite George secretly meeting Brenda where they agree it is weird. Mary sees Pastor Rob there on a date with someone she used to babysit. Mary becomes upset so she goes out drinking and dancing with Brenda, much to George's happy surprise. Meanwhile, Connie agrees to a date with Dr. Linkletter but he quickly gets drunk and annoys her the whole time.
108	3	"Passion's Harvest and a Sheldocracy"	Jeremy Howe	Story by : Chuck Lorre & Steven Molaro & Connor Kilpatrick; Teleplay by : Steve Holland & Nick Bakay & Marie Cheng	October 13, 2022	T12.17703	7.25
Connie gives Mary a romance novel to read. Finding it trashy, Mary decides to write her own. The man she creates that is emotionally supportive turns her on to George's surprise and Dale's bafflement. Mandy has financial problems and is kicked out of her apartment. She moves into Georgie's garage and has a breakdown of what a mess her life is. Georgie comforts her and she thanks him for trying to be supportive. He later steals back Mandy's possessions from her landlord. Georgie then helps her move into Connie's guest room. Meanwhile, Dr. Sturgis assigns Sheldon to pick and argue a side in an ethical debate. Sheldon finds it frustrating that there is no clear correct answer. He decides the smartest people should make all the decisions in an autocracy, and tries to take over Dr. Sturgis' class.
109	4	"Blonde Ambition and the Concept of Zero"	Shiri Appleby	Story by : Steve Holland & Eric Kaplan & Nadiya Chettiar; Teleplay by : Steven Molaro & Jeremy Howe & Connor Kilpatrick	October 20, 2022	T12.17704	6.80
At Brenda's request, George is able to get Sheldon to tutor Billy in math so Billy can pass sixth grade. While teaching him, Billy asks how can zero both exist as something but be nothing. This causes Sheldon to have an existential crisis which later spreads to Dr. Sturgis and Linkletter. Talking with Billy again, he suggests they just pretend it exists which Sheldon interprets as an act of faith which restores him. Billy is able to pass and later get into seventh grade; though Adult Sheldon narrates he would stay there for years. Meanwhile, after Connie's advice on boys backfires on Missy, she starts going to Mandy for advice, to the chagrin of Mary and Connie. Missy finds Mandy very cool and later botches an attempt to dye her hair blonde to look like Mandy. Mandy and Georgie try and hide this from George and Mary but Missy sneaks out the bathroom window for Connie's help, who immediately returns her to her parents.
110	5	"A Resident Advisor and the Word 'Sketchy'"	Alex Reid	Story by : Chuck Lorre & Steve Holland & Nick Bakay; Teleplay by : Steven Molaro & Jeremy Howe & Yael Glouberman	October 27, 2022	T12.17705	7.07
Mary allows Sheldon to stay overnight in his college dorm for an early class. Sheldon hates the loud partying at night. He gets President Hagemayer to make him Resident Advisor but ends up duct taped to the wall for his efforts to enforce the rules by shutting off the hot water. Mary and George rekindle their romance, alarming Missy, though George turns down Mary's idea that they have another baby, saying she just feels out of place without the church and now that the kids are older. Missy hangs out with Georgie and Mandy and is comforted by their bickering. Meanwhile, Connie talks Dale into renting a truck to Mississippi so she can expand her casino business with video poker machines. Dale admits he was wrong to breakup with Connie. They pay a man named Dennis for them but he follows them in an attempted shakedown since the machines aren't legal in Texas. After Connie deflates Dennis' tires, Dale punches him out.
111	6	"An Ugly Car, an Affair and Some Kickass Football"	Nikki Lorre	Story by : Steve Holland & Steven Molaro & Connor Kilpatrick; Teleplay by : Eric Kaplan & Nadiya Chettiar & Marie Cheng	November 3, 2022	T12.17706	6.89
Georgie trades in his car for a more family-oriented one, impressing Mandy. Mandy becomes suspicious about Connie's money and expanded business once Officer Jake pays a visit. Connie and Georgie reveal the gambling rooms, and Mandy is very excited her baby will have secure finances. After watching Georgie take care of Sheldon, Mandy stays with Georgie for the night and meets an amused Connie in the morning. Meanwhile, Coach Wayne Wilkins' wife Darlene cheated on him with his best friend, and is now pregnant. Principal Peterson convinces George to come back and coach a major football game with Wayne emotionally checked-out. George's team wins and Principal Peterson offers him his job back. After securing Wayne's job as well, George accepts.
112	7	"A Tougher Nut and a Note on File"	Michael Judd	Story by : Jeremy Howe & Yael Glouberman & Ben Slaughter; Teleplay by : Steve Holland & Steven Molaro & Nick Bakay	November 10, 2022	T12.17707	7.13
While out to dinner, Mandy and Georgie run into her parents: Audrey and Jim. Though Jim is open to getting to know Georgie and seems to miss his daughter, Audrey is cold to them both. Georgie visiting the tire store they own doesn't help, and Mandy is angry Georgie went behind her back. Jim shows up at the Cooper household to leave money for Mandy and meets George and Mary. Mandy finds out he is there and says her parents must apologize to be part of her life again. Meanwhile, Sheldon is upset Missy sold a comic at the store that is very rare that Sheldon was seeking. Talking to adult comic fan Nathan, Sheldon seeks a comic to trade but then gets the idea for an online comic database. He talks Missy's boss into letting him count all his inventory for the database and brings Nathan to help. Sheldon realizes a database could be used for helping grantors and grantees in the scientific community connect. He abandons his comic idea, leaving Nathan alone to steal from the store. Sheldon tells his database idea to President Hagemeyer, who loves the idea because they could charge an access fee and dismisses Sheldon.
113	8	"Legalese and a Whole Hoo-Ha"	Alex Reid	Story by : Steve Holland & Nick Bakay & Eric Kaplan; Teleplay by : Steven Molaro & Jeremy Howe & Connor Kilpatrick	December 8, 2022	T12.17708	7.18
When President Hagemeyer brings in Sheldon's parents to sign a contract for Sheldon's database idea, his parents are concerned when the University wants to take 90%. Dr. Linkletter believes he should get a portion as he put the idea of databases in Sheldon's head in the first place. President Hagemeyer and Dr. Linkletter both try various bribes to sway Sheldon to their side (naming a science center after him and giving him a Feynman autograph respectively) while Mary uses a similar tactic (putting more hot dogs in his spaghetti) to try and get him to plan to use the money for his future. At the legal meeting, all three sides claim Sheldon agrees with them. Sheldon storms out, upset they all care about money and not science. Mary apologizes and asks what Sheldon wants. Sheldon decides to go to private investors for the money, leaving Mary baffled. Meanwhile, Pastor Jeff and his congregation take offense to some of the content in the movies at Connie's video store. Connie and Mandy are both greatly irritated but agree to play along once Georgie points out they cannot have extra attention exposing the gambling rooms. Pastor Jeff pushes for more control and Connie and Mandy eventually stop him by discovering what videos his wife and the Church Elders have previously rented.
114	9	"College Dropouts and the Medford Miracle"	Nikki Lorre	Story by : Steven Molaro & Connor Kilpatrick & Marie Cheng; Teleplay by : Steve Holland & Nadiya Chettiar & Yael Glouberman	January 5, 2023	T12.17709	7.43
Sheldon finds that no investors are willing to take him seriously due to his age. He gets the idea to team up with Dr. Sturgis, but then the investors would want Sheldon's full focus to be on the database; his parents strictly refuse to let him drop out of school. Sheldon remembers Gary, the rich investor with strange beliefs that gave Sheldon money for being honest years ago. At the meeting, Sheldon and Dr. Sturgis find him baffling. Meanwhile, George is back coaching and Pastor Rob is brought in to pray with the team. They win, but everyone gives Pastor Rob and God the credit, to George's chagrin. George deliberately takes Pastor's Rob's advice on a play at another game, thinking he'll be blamed for the loss and forced to stop hanging around the team; but they win again, annoying George. Meanwhile, Missy brings a boy, Dean, over to Connie's. Dean had recently lost his own grandmother and grows attached to Connie, to both her and Missy's irritation.
115	10	"Pancake Sunday and Textbook Flirting"	Jaffar Mahmood	Story by : Steve Holland & Nick Bakay & Jeremy Howe; Teleplay by : Steven Molaro & Eric Kaplan & Connor Kilpatrick	January 12, 2023	T12.17710	7.20
Mary is adrift without the church. George suggests she make some new friends. She eventually winds up with Brenda and her drinking buddies. The other women tease Brenda about a secret crush that she won't tell them about, whom they speculate is married. Mary loves the gossip and tells George. When George secretly confronts Brenda about this, she claims it is not him, though her face after George leaves hints at otherwise. A hungover Mary is later woken up by Sheldon attempting to tell her all about the lore of Star Trek. Meanwhile, a young woman named Amber flirts with Georgie at the video store. Mandy encourages Georgie to go out with her as they are not together. Georgie is upset but eventually goes on the date. He ends up telling Amber about himself and Mandy's pregnancy. Amber finds it weird but also relates since she is in the middle of a divorce after a year's marriage. Mandy later admits to Connie she regrets pushing Georgie away. The next day Georgie thanks Mandy for her encouragement as he has a lot in common with Amber, unknowing of Mandy's feelings.
116	11	"Ruthless, Toothless, and a Week of Bed Rest"	Alex Reid	Story by : Steven Molaro & Eric Kaplan & Nadiya Chettiar; Teleplay by : Steve Holland & Jeremy Howe & Marie Cheng	February 2, 2023	T12.17711	7.31
Mandy is ordered to take a week of bedrest by the doctor, and Connie throws her back out. Mary takes care of them both and Mandy grows closer to Mary, revealing the baby will be a girl. After hearing Mandy's mother, Audrey, again reject her over the phone, Mary visits and berates Audrey until she is willing to call Mandy. With Georgie short-staffed at Connie's businesses, he brings in George and Missy to help. After George embarrasses Missy, she reveals Billy has told her about George meeting Brenda in the chicken coop more than once. George is able to pass it off as Brenda having a hard time and them speaking as friends. Meanwhile, Sheldon and Dr. Sturgis learn that Dr. Linkletter and President Hagemeyer are building their own database. Sheldon and Dr. Sturgis offer the other programmer more money from Gary. President Hagemeyer plans to put two roommates in Sheldon's dorm room. Gary buys a mainframe computer which Sheldon has placed in his room to prevent this. Upon plugging it in, there is a large blackout.
117	12	"A Baby Shower and a Testosterone-Rich Banter"	Jeremy Howe	Story by : Steve Holland & Steven Molaro & Connor Kilpatrick; Teleplay by : Eric Kaplan & Nadiya Chettiar & Yael Glouberman	February 9, 2023	T12.17712	7.73
Mary invites Audrey to a baby shower for Mandy. Her father, Jim, and Connor, her 22 year old, unemployed, vegetarian, artist brother visit the Cooper men. Mary is agitated when Audrey takes over the event. After talking with Amber, Georgie gets a gift for Mandy, a heart locket with a sonogram picture of their daughter. Mandy continues to be conflicted that Georgie is seeing someone else, but doesn't admit it to him. George and Jim bond over having sons they don't understand. Sheldon and Connor slightly bond over comic books. Audrey offers to let Mandy move back into a nursery with her family, but insults Georgie, for which Mandy storms off. Audrey then has Jim and Connor leave with her, to Jim's disappointment.
118	13	"A Frat Party, a Sleepover and the Mother of All Blisters"	Jason Alexander	Story by : Chuck Lorre & Steve Holland & Nick Bakay; Teleplay by : Steven Molaro & Jeremy Howe & Connor Kilpatrick	February 16, 2023	T12.17713	7.30
At the university, Sheldon runs into Paige, attending a frat party. She had dropped out of college and now feels very lonely, getting drunk. She drags Sheldon to another house party, where Missy also is, invited by a friend's older sister. Missy and Sheldon stop Paige from doing anything too reckless and Missy states she will stay in Paige's life. They take her back to Sheldon's room and Missy makes Sheldon promise not to tell on them. George and Mary find out that Missy has gone to some party. George and Georgie drive around for her talking about what kind of parent Georgie wants to be, while Mary and Mandy reflect on their pasts when they were younger. George and Mary are relieved and angry when Missy returns. Meanwhile Dale spends the night at Connie's but decide they can be comfortable together without spending every night together.
119	14	"A Launch Party and a Whole Human Being"	Alex Reid	Story by : Steven Molaro & Connor Kilpatrick & Marie Cheng; Teleplay by : Steve Holland & Jeremy Howe & Nadiya Chettiar	March 2, 2023	T12.17714	7.62
The day of Sheldon's database launch arrives. Pastor Rob invites Mary to lunch and asks her opinion of him moving away for another church. Mandy goes into labor, and with only Sheldon home he brings in Brenda Sparks. Georgie misses these events due to putting in the car seat for the baby. George arrives at the hospital and Mary sees George and Brenda together as she arrives with Pastor Rob. Mary accuses Brenda of having feelings for George. In turn, Brenda accuses Mary of having feelings for Rob, and George accuses Rob of having feelings for Mary. Mandy's parents and Connie also arrive. Missy and Billy Sparks are forgotten at school and Billy annoys her by asking what it would be like if George and Brenda got together. Georgie has a small panic attack about being ready to be a father but Sheldon inadvertently helps him feel ready for the birth, and installs the car seat for Georgie. Mandy and Georgie name their daughter Constance. Mary states she will spend the night at Connie's which George supports. Sheldon is upset when his database launches with no subscribers.
120	15	"Teen Angst and a Smart-Boy Walk of Shame"	Shiri Appleby	Story by : Steve Holland & Nick Bakay & Connor Kilpatrick; Teleplay by : Steven Molaro & Nadiya Chettiar & Yael Glouberman	March 9, 2023	T12.17715	7.66
Sheldon is upset over the failure of his database. Dr. Sturgis advises that dealing with failure and setbacks make someone better. Sheldon tries throwing a football and calming down his new niece CeCe, but is surprisingly talented at both. He later tries and fails to understand sarcasm with Dr. Linkletter. Georgie and Mandy adjust to being parents and do fairly well despite the exhaustion. George and Mary spend time apart; while both insist nothing has ever happened, they both admit to liking being around Brenda and Rob respectively, and don't know what to do next. Mary decides to stay with Connie longer. Missy is upset she was forgotten at school, missed the birth, and is being kept in the dark about the problems her parents are having and constantly overlooked with everyone else preoccupied. She gets in trouble at school for which her parents berate her. Upon seeing Mary comfort Sheldon over his database, Missy packs her things that night, and drives off in George's truck.
121	16	"A Stolen Truck and Going on the Lam"	Ruby Stillwater	Story by : Steven Molaro & Eric Kaplan & Jeremy Howe; Teleplay by : Steve Holland & Connor Kilpatrick & Marie Cheng	March 30, 2023	T12.17716	7.13
Missy calls Paige and they decide to run away to Daytona Beach together. They have fun getting into trouble and bonding over how Missy feels overlooked and how Paige doesn't like being a child genius. Nobody notices they are gone until Mary notices that George's truck is missing. Once Sheldon says Missy is still in touch with Paige, they call her mother, Linda. A cop pulls Missy over in Louisiana and Missy instantly admits everything. The cop later lets the girls use her radar gun to catch speedsters. While driving to get them, George, Mary and Linda discuss the Coopers' marriage and Linda's divorce. George scoffs at the idea of going to Linda's marriage counselor, and all three bicker over each other's issues at parenting. Sheldon stays home with Connie, baffled by Missy's behavior. While driving home, a dejected Missy states she liked it better when her parents weren't talking to each other. Adult Sheldon narrates this is just the start of Missy's "difficult" times.
122	17	"A German Folk Song and an Actual Adult"	Kabir Akhtar	Story by : Steve Holland & Jeremy Howe & Nadiya Chettiar; Teleplay by : Steven Molaro, Eric Kaplan & Yael Glouberman	April 13, 2023	T12.17717	6.88
With Missy grounded for stealing her father's truck, she is most upset over being banned from watching episodes of Beverly Hills, 90210. Sheldon offers to watch the show for her and tell her what happens and actually starts getting invested. Mary returns to work but gets into an argument with Brenda. Brenda later shows up at the house suggesting they deal with their issues. She insists she and George only talked and that Brenda believes George found it easier to talk to another person, like Mary did with Pastor Rob. Mary and Brenda reach a kind of understanding. On Georgie's 18th birthday, Mandy plans him a party but Amber asks him on a date during which Georgie breaks up with Amber, deciding he prefers to be home with Mandy and the baby. Georgie asks Mandy to marry him.
123	18	"Little Green Men and a Fella's Marriage Proposal"	Matthew A. Cherry	Story by : Steven Molaro & Jeremy Howe & Marie Cheng; Teleplay by : Steve Holland & Eric Kaplan & Nadiya Chettiar	April 27, 2023	T12.17718	7.20
A surprised Mandy rejects Georgie's marriage proposal and he leaves hurt. Mandy admits to Connie she was caught off guard. After arguing at the pediatrician's office, they accidentally lock Cece in the car. Georgie gets her out and he and Mandy make peace, though she stops him from proposing again. Meanwhile, a cheerleader asks Billy Sparks on a date but Missy reveals it is just a prank. She offers to go to the movies with Billy, but is invited to the cheerleader's party at the same time. Though the adults encourage her to do the right thing, she tells Billy who says Missy should go to the party, which she does. Sheldon begins considering if life on other planets is possible, but both Dr. Linkletter and Dr. Sturgis reject the idea as ridiculous. Sheldon eventually partners with another professor, causing Linkletter and Sturgis to join them -- just in case Sheldon is right.
124	19	"A New Weather Girl and a Stay-at-Home Coddler"	Alex Reid	Story by : Steve Holland & Eric Kaplan & Yael Glouberman; Teleplay by : Steven Molaro & Jeremy Howe & Connor Kilpatrick	May 4, 2023	T12.17719	7.14
When the local news station has an opening for a new weathergirl, Mandy decides to apply for the job. Georgie is surprised, thinking she'd stay home with the baby. Mandy is annoyed he doesn't support her and decides to get ready anyway. Cece proves to be a good luck charm in the gambling room with Georgie. Connie later tells him he should support Mandy and it could also be good for Cece. Georgie apologizes to Mandy. During her audition, Mandy has an unfortunate accident when she unexpectedly begins to lactate. Sheldon realizes his classmates are planning to spend the summer beefing up their resumes for grad school and that he cannot rely on being a child genius anymore; so he may not get into Caltech as he had planned. Sheldon blames Mary and Dr. Linkletter and Dr. Sturgis for this, while Missy thinks he is worried over nothing but excited that he may be moving out. After Sheldon's apology, Dr. Sturgis tells Sheldon about a summer opportunity at a university in Germany.
125	20	"German for Beginners and a Crazy Old Man with a Bat"	Nikki Lorre	Story by : Steven Molaro & Jeremy Howe & Connor Kilpatrick; Teleplay by : Steve Holland & Nadiya Chettiar & Marie Cheng	May 11, 2023	T12.17720	6.69
Connie's gambling room is broken into overnight and the cash stolen. Dale tries to act tough to protect the place. They now take the cash to Connie's, so Dale and Georgie try to protect the house. Missy meets Tonya, Pastor Jeff's rebellious niece who was sent to stay with him for the summer. The two quickly bond and sneak out at night together, with Missy trying a cigarette. But they quickly turn back home upon seeing someone awake at Connie's house. Seeing them, but unable to see who it is, Dale and Georgie think they scared off potential robbers. With the college not willing to fund Sheldon's trip to Germany, his parents firmly tell him he cannot go. He tries to sell some of his things in a yard sale but finds he cannot part with anything. Sheldon is dejected but Dr. Linkletter and Pastor Jeff each show up with a gift of money from the school faculty and church congregation respectively; many people are excited for Sheldon to go to Germany for the summer and leave them alone.
126	21	"A Romantic Getaway and a Germanic Meat-Based Diet"	Michael Judd	Story by : Steve Holland & Jeremy Howe & Connor Kilpatrick; Teleplay by : Steven Molaro & Eric Kaplan & Yael Glouberman	May 18, 2023	T12.17721	6.89
Mandy invites Georgie to go with her to a spa weekend. While Georgie accepts, they get into an argument during a couples' massage in their room, when Georgie says Mandy keeps drawing him in but then pushes him away. On their drive home, Mandy belatedly accepts his marriage proposal and they happily make up. While Sheldon is adapting to 'German time' with a very early breakfast, he sees Missy returning home and sneaking back into the house. Missy persuades him not to tell on her by saying if she gets in trouble, their parents will both want to stay home and Sheldon wouldn't go to Germany. His conscience eventually makes him tell. Missy is grounded for the entire summer and when he tries to explain he was concerned for her, she coldly says she hates him. Mary and George argue over which of them should go with Sheldon; George eventually agrees it should be Mary.
127	22	"A Tornado, a 10-Hour Flight and a Darn Fine Ring"	Alex Reid	Story by : Steven Molaro & Jeremy Howe & Nadiya Chettiar; Teleplay by : Steve Holland & Connor Kilpatrick & Ben Slaughter	May 18, 2023	T12.17722	6.97
Mary and Sheldon leave for the airport with Missy still angry with her parents and Sheldon. Mary is worried Sheldon will get upset on the plane, but he ends up talking to a famous scientist the whole time. Georgie gets a big advance on his pay from Connie to buy Mandy an expensive engagement ring. They go to tell Mandy's parents they are engaged, though Mandy and her mother get into another argument. As this happens, a tornado hits town; leaving the car, George protects Missy by lying over her in a drainage ditch; Pastor Jeff is in the laundromat when Connie and Dale take everyone to shelter inside the gambling room; Mandy and her mother continue bickering. While everyone is physically safe, and George comforts an emotional and apologetic Missy, Connie's house is destroyed and her gambling room money scattered. As everyone helps her sort through the wreckage and collect up the money, she accepts Dale's offer to move in with him, while George offers Mandy and Cece Sheldon's room. Sheldon and Mary land in Germany unaware of the tornado but unable to get anyone to answer the phone.

=== Season 7 (2024) ===
No. overall	No. in season	Title	Directed by	Written by	Original release date	Prod. code	U.S. viewers (millions)
128	1	"A Wiener Schnitzel and Underwear in a Tree"	Alex Reid	Story by : Chuck Lorre & Steve Holland & Steven Molaro; Teleplay by : Nick Bakay & Jeremy Howe & Connor Kilpatrick	February 15, 2024	T12.18701	7.99
Soon after the tornado, Connie is told her insurance does not cover the damage. She decides to stay at George's after Dale makes an insensitive joke about it. Missy steps up as the responsible one running the house and talking with Dale about his feelings. Pastor Jeff's wife finds Connie's cash but, since it was illegally gained, uses it to buy a big-screen television. Pastor Jeff later gives it to George without explaining. Hearing the news in Germany, Mary wants to go back home, but Sheldon refuses, saying it won't change anything and he doesn't want to miss his classes. Everyone at home says it is already too crowded anyway. Mary instead gets drunk, embarrassing Sheldon. She is later seen throwing up in the restroom which leads to Sheldon being insensitive and throwing up as well.
129	2	"A Roulette Wheel and a Piano Playing Dog"	Nikki Lorre	Story by : Steve Holland & Nick Bakay & Nadiya Chettiar; Teleplay by : Chuck Lorre & Steven Molaro & Eric Kaplan	February 22, 2024	T12.18702	7.14
Sheldon finds he is academically behind everyone else in his class in Germany, and a girl younger than him is sent to tutor him, amusing Mary. Sheldon struggles with not being the smartest for once, but after calling Dr. Linkletter, he is encouraged to listen and learn, which he eventually does, thinking himself quite humble. Meanwhile, to make more money quicker, Connie has a roulette wheel put into the gaming room. Georgie is hesitant about this, especially after hearing what the Dixie Mafia did to the previous owner, but Mandy talks him into it. Missy continues to run the house and talk with Georgie about his fears and encourage George and Mandy's father, Jim, to help out. But she feels unappreciated and makes a chore chart for everyone.
130	3	"A Strudel and a Hot American Boy Toy"	Jeremy Howe	Story by : Chuck Lorre & Steven Molaro & Nick Bakay; Teleplay by : Steve Holland & Connor Kilpatrick & Yael Glouberman	February 29, 2024	T12.18703	7.10
To save money on long distance calls, George starts writing letters to update Mary. Mary is rather touched and writes back with her own updates and tells George how much she loves him. Sheldon wants to explore the German trains by himself but Mary forbids it. He starts lying about where he goes, but loses his bag on a train after getting off for food. Missy takes another call when Sheldon asks her for help. Sheldon explains the situation to two police officers, who refuse him a ride, forcing him to walk back, during which he is chased by a small wiener dog. Missy eventually calls Mary about what happened before Sheldon walks in. He lies about where was he and Mary writes to George about how he squirms with guilt. Georgie writes his own letter to Mandy that she enjoys. Missy's new friend Taylor is a boy, but to keep George in the dark, Missy lies that he is gay and George falls for it. Meanwhile, Connie moves in with Dale and they adjust to living together, which proves difficult.
131	4	"Ants on a Log and a Cheating Winker"	Michael Judd	Story by : Chuck Lorre & Steve Holland & Jeremy Howe; Teleplay by : Steven Molaro & Connor Kilpatrick & Nadiya Chettiar	March 7, 2024	T12.18704	6.82
Sheldon and Mary return from Germany. Sheldon is irritated that his room is taken and that the baby will not stop crying. Returning to the university, he finds someone studying computer science in his room. Not bothering to learn the other student's name, he instead gets caught up in a computer game they have. Mary feels out of place with the house functioning without her and spends the day with George's football team but George is against it being a regular thing. Mary finds her place again consoling Missy after Taylor dumps her. Sheldon returns home and thinks he spots George with another woman (resulting in adult Sheldon's misconception about George owing to which he never spoke to him again) but it is just Mary roleplaying as Helga, a German woman. Older Sheldon states after this he started adding extra knocks on doors (referencing adult Sheldon's norm in The Big Bang Theory).
132	5	"A Frankenstein's Monster and a Crazy Church Guy"	Alex Reid	Story by : Steven Molaro & Nick Bakay & Eric Kaplan; Teleplay by : Chuck Lorre & Steve Holland & Marie Cheng	March 14, 2024	T12.18705	6.52
Missy learns from Billy Sparks that his mom is out of town and persuades him to throw a party. Georgie and Mandy are unwilling to get them get beer but Georgie gives Missy some fireworks. Billy buys beer after Missy realizes that he looks old enough. Mary donates $50 to a televangelist, which George isn't happy about. He convinces Pastor Jeff to talk to Mary about returning to their church. Mary is at first unconvinced since she just got an $800 tax refund. While praying on it, a bird poops in her eye; later, her car won't start, she breaks her pinky toe and she is hit in the rear by a small firework from the party, so she agrees to go back to her old church. The next day there, Missy starts throwing up in the collection plate while hungover. Meanwhile, Sheldon and his roommate Evan and his friend create an AI to trade stocks for them. It works well but seemingly develops a mind of its own and starts making its own trading decisions, including trading overseas. Sheldon tries to ask it physics questions as well, which makes them start losing money. Eventually, Sheldon throws the computer out the (closed) window, destroying it.
133	6	"Baptists, Catholics and an Attempted Drowning"	Matthew A. Cherry	Story by : Chuck Lorre & Steve Holland & Ben Slaughter; Teleplay by : Steven Molaro & Jeremy Howe & Connor Kilpatrick	April 4, 2024	T12.18706	6.74
Missy loses sleep due to hearing "people do it all night." So Mary asks Georgie and Mandy about their wedding plans. Realizing they have no reason to wait, they decide to get married at City Hall the next week. Mandy's mother Audrey offers to pay for a bigger formal wedding. As Mandy's family is Catholic and the Coopers are Baptist, Mary and Audrey get into an argument about where the wedding should be and what religion to raise Cece with. Mary secretly calls Pastor Jeff to baptize Cece in the kitchen sink. While distracting Mandy, Audrey has her priest also baptize Cece. Sheldon comes home upset that Evan upgraded Sheldon's computer behind his back and thus he cannot defeat it at chess now. This makes Mary admit what she did to Mandy. Audrey later does the same. Mandy is angry with them both and Georgie doesn't initially see why. Mandy talks it over with Connie and Dale as Georgie apologizes. Mandy decides she and Georgie should get married immediately at City Hall without their parents and Georgie, Connie and Dale are on board.
134	7	"A Proper Wedding and Skeletons in the Closet"	Michael Judd	Story by : Steven Molaro & Eric Kaplan & Nadiya Chettiar; Teleplay by : Chuck Lorre & Steve Holland & Yael Glouberman	April 11, 2024	T12.18707	7.35
Both sets of parents (and Missy) are informed and rush over to City Hall and are allowed to be part of the wedding. After the ceremony at dinner, Sheldon is happy he was left out of the ceremony. Audrey offers to pay for Georgie and Mandy to have a weekend at Dollywood as their honeymoon. On the drive there Mandy and Georgie discuss aspects of their future and pull over to have sex. Cece is left with Connie but the police come to shut down the gambling room and arrest her after she tries to run down the sidewalk with a stroller. Since it is a Friday the judge is away and Connie will have to stay in jail for the weekend. Dale gets Cece and gives her to Mary. Audrey finds out about the gambling room and Georgie working there, leading to tension. Jim and George break that bit over dinner as both couples discuss extended family members they have issues with. Meanwhile, the arrest makes Sheldon learn of the gambling room as he was the only one in the Cooper family that never knew. Missy pranks him by saying there is a dead body under Mary's prayer garden in the backyard, and has him dig for it.
135	8	"An Ankle Monitor and a Big Plastic Crap House"	Jeremy Howe	Story by : Chuck Lorre & Steve Holland & Connor Kilpatrick; Teleplay by : Steven Molaro & Nick Bakay & Eric Kaplan	April 18, 2024	T12.18708	7.15
Connie is put under house arrest at Dale's with an ankle bracelet. Sheldon studies law but Connie rejects his idea that she pleaded insanity. A lawyer Dale knows says she can probably avoid jail if she pleads guilty, pays some fines and loses the laundromat and video store as well. Connie reluctantly agrees. The septic tank at the Cooper house breaks. George brings in a portable toilet that soon has a snake get inside. Connie has secretly stashed more money at their house and Mary catches her retrieving it. Connie gives her some of the money for the repairs after hearing about the snake. Meanwhile, the plumbing issue makes Mandy and Georgie move in with Audrey and Jim. Audrey initially intends to talk Mandy out of the marriage but Georgie's helpfulness around the house, determination to get a job and being with Cece soften Audrey slightly. Audrey allows Jim to hire Georgie at the tire store. Meanwhile, at night, George goes into the portable toilet, but soon realizes there’s a snake inside.
136	9	"A Fancy Article and a Scholarship for a Baby"	Ansley Rix	Story by : Chuck Lorre & Steven Molaro & Marie Cheng; Teleplay by : Steve Holland & Jeremy Howe & Nadiya Chettiar	April 25, 2024	T12.18709	6.86
A paper that Sheldon cowrote with his tutor in Germany is published internationally. Several prestigious universities contact George and Mary, attempting to woo Sheldon for grad school, and offering to pay for all travel expenses for both him and the family. President Hagemeyer finds out and demands Drs. Linkletter and Sturgis use their bond with Sheldon, Sheldon's local family ties and dislike of change so he will stay at East Texas Tech. She also offers potential scholarships for Georgie, Missy and Cece to George and Mary. Sheldon narrows it down to either MIT or Caltech. He cannot decide and almost chooses to stay, until Drs. Linkletter and Sturgis admit that Sheldon has surpassed them both and that he must move on for both science and his future. Sheldon picks MIT but, after George and Sheldon fly to Boston and see a snow storm outside the airport, they both agree to change to Caltech. Meanwhile, at Audrey's suggestion, Georgie tries to become more well-spoken for Cece.
137	10	"Community Service and the Key to a Happy Marriage"	Nikki Lorre	Story by : Steven Molaro & Jeremy Howe & Connor Kilpatrick; Teleplay by : Steve Holland & Eric Kaplan & Ben Slaughter	May 2, 2024	T12.18711	7.17
Connie must complete 180 hours of community service and meets with her no-nonsense probation officer Rhonda Thompson (Octavia Spencer). She decides to do it at Mary's church, thinking it will be quick and easy. Mary refuses to inflate Connie's hours and insists she actually work by sorting through the church's large and messy donations room. Connie finds out George knows Rhonda and tries to have him reduce the number of hours for her, though it backfires and Rhonda gives Connie two days to finish the room. Connie brings in Sheldon, who loves doing it, but an angry Mary removes him. The next day Mary decides to help with Sheldon, not actually wanting Connie to go to jail, and irritated by Sheldon's need to finish the room. Connie submits the first 40 hours with Mary's support. Meanwhile, Mandy and Audrey are sniping at each other over parenting Cece. Mandy is upset when Georgie doesn't agree with her. Jim advises that Georgie just agree with them both individually but Mandy catches on. She wants them to be better than her parents, which Georgie truly supports. Georgie and Jim leave once Mandy and Audrey argue about marriage.
138	11	"A Little Snip and Teaching Old Dogs"	Ruby Stillwater	Story by : Steve Holland & Nadiya Chettiar & Yael Glouberman; Teleplay by : Steven Molaro & Connor Kilpatrick & Ben Slaughter	May 9, 2024	T12.18710	6.65
Sheldon has less than two months before he leaves for California. He gives President Hagemeyer his ideas for the future physics curriculum at East Texas Tech. Drs. Sturgis and Linkletter do not understand it and must ask Sheldon to tutor them. The teaching techniques Sheldon learned in Germany are not appreciated by the two men. A call to Connie convinces Sheldon to be patient and they both catch on. Meanwhile, Mary loves babysitting Cece and is open to the idea of another baby. This alarms George who after talking with Coach Wilkins and Principal Peterson decides to secretly get a vasectomy and afterwards lies to Mary about getting hurt at work. Mary decides she doesn't want another baby after all, to George's disdain.
139	12	"A New Home and a Traditional Texas Torture"	Alex Reid	Story by : Chuck Lorre & Steve Holland & Eric Kaplan; Teleplay by : Steven Molaro & Nadiya Chettiar & Connor Kilpatrick	May 9, 2024	T12.18712	6.82
Wanting to wrap things up in Texas, Sheldon visits his local comic bookstore, has one last lunch with Tam in the high school library (though Tam had graduated the previous year), and says goodbye to his former science teacher Mr. Givens. Principal Petersen tells George that Rice University is going to offer him a coaching job, which is George's dream. Talking with Mary, she feels ready to move to Houston with him and Missy. Everyone except Sheldon is excited by this opportunity. Sheldon attempts to get Connie, Georgie and Mandy and East Texas Tech to buy the house, but it doesn't work. President Hagemeyer says maybe Sheldon is truly scared of going to California. The next afternoon, as the family prepares for a family portrait photo, Coach Wilkins and Principal Peterson arrive at the Coopers' door and inform them that George has suffered a fatal heart attack at work.
140	13	"Funeral"	Michael Judd	Chuck Lorre & Steven Molaro & Steve Holland	May 16, 2024	T12.18713	9.15
As the family prepares for George's funeral, expressing their grief in different ways, Sheldon imagines alternate timelines featuring a variety of things he could have said to George during the last time before his father left the house for work, rather than keeping silent and ignoring George as he usually did. At the funeral, several characters deliver eulogies for George. Georgie reflects on how his father always supported him no matter how he behaved. Connie makes humorous references to George's eating and drinking habits while remarking that, despite her initial disapproval of Mary's decision to pursue a relationship with him, she grew to love him as a son. Principal Petersen struggles to maintain his composure during his speech. Mary tearfully vents her anger about George leaving behind the family. Finally, Sheldon visualizes himself giving a powerfully moving speech on everything he wishes he could have said had he known George was about to die. The adult Sheldon, now comfortable saying what he wanted to say in the past, narrates that he loved his father and will always miss him.
141	14	"Memoir"	Alex Reid	Chuck Lorre & Steven Molaro & Steve Holland	May 16, 2024	T12.18714	9.32
In the weeks following George's funeral, Sheldon, now a college graduate, prepares to leave for California when Mary insists that he and Missy be baptized. They are reluctant to do so until Connie convinces them otherwise, not wanting to see her daughter overwhelmed by grief. She visits Mary while she is praying at George's gravestone, urging her to spend time with her children before they leave the house. At the church, a still grieving Missy storms out, but Sheldon, wanting to show support for Mary yet stay hygienic in a potentially unsanitary tub of water, dons a wetsuit and scuba diving gear to be baptized. In the present, the adult Sheldon, seen writing his memoir of his Texas childhood, now lives in a suburban Los Angeles house with his wife, Amy Farrah Fowler, their son Leonard, and an unnamed daughter. Amy struggles to convince Sheldon to join her in watching Leonard play in a school hockey game until he realizes he should spend more time with his children as Mary and George did with him, Missy, and Georgie. Sheldon visualizes himself in his childhood home some time after Mary sold it, recalling one of the last conversations he had with Missy about cherishing his last day in the house before leaving. Finally, the young Sheldon arrives at Caltech; when a professor (David Saltzberg) passing by asks if he is lost, he replies that he is exactly where he's supposed to be.

== Ratings ==
=== Season 1 ===
Viewership and ratings per episode of List of Young Sheldon episodes
No.	Title	Air date	Rating/share (18–49)	Viewers (millions)	DVR (18–49)	DVR viewers (millions)	Total (18–49)	Total viewers (millions)
1	"Pilot"	September 25, 2017	3.8/13	17.21	1.7	5.25	5.5	22.46
2	"Rockets, Communists, and the Dewey Decimal System"	November 2, 2017	2.2/8	12.66	1.1	3.89	3.3	16.74
3	"Poker, Faith, and Eggs"	November 9, 2017	2.2/8	12.39	1.2	4.07	3.4	16.47
4	"A Therapist, a Comic Book, and a Breakfast Sausage"	November 16, 2017	2.0/8	11.83	1.2	3.54	3.2	15.37
5	"A Solar Calculator, a Game Ball, and a Cheerleader's Bosom"	November 23, 2017	2.6/11	11.43	1.3	4.10	3.9	15.53
6	"A Patch, a Modem, and a Zantac"	November 30, 2017	2.1/8	12.11	1.0	3.60	3.1	15.71
7	"A Brisket, Voodoo and Cannonball Run"	December 7, 2017	2.2/8	12.49	1.1	3.71	3.3	16.20
8	"Cape Canaveral, Schrödinger's Cat, and Cyndi Lauper's Hair"	December 14, 2017	2.0/8	11.64	—N/a	—N/a	—N/a	—N/a
9	"Spock, Kirk, and Testicular Hernia"	December 21, 2017	1.8/8	11.32	—N/a	—N/a	—N/a	—N/a
10	"An Eagle Feather, a String Bean, and an Eskimo"	January 4, 2018	2.6/10	14.70	1.1	3.73	3.7	18.43
11	"Demons, Sunday School, and Prime Numbers"	January 11, 2018	2.6/10	14.17	1.1	3.81	3.7	17.99
12	"A Computer, a Plastic Pony, and a Case of Beer"	January 18, 2018	2.4/9	13.33	1.2	4.04	3.6	17.37
13	"A Sneeze, Detention, and Sissy Spacek"	February 1, 2018	2.3/9	12.92	1.3	4.03	3.6	16.95
14	"Potato Salad, a Broomstick, and Dad's Whiskey"	March 1, 2018	2.1/8	12.42	1.3	4.30	3.4	16.72
15	"Dolomite, Apple Slices, and a Mystery Woman"	March 8, 2018	2.1/9	12.52	1.2	4.09	3.3	16.61
16	"Killer Asteroids, Oklahoma, and a Frizzy Hair Machine"	March 29, 2018	2.0/9	11.91	1.2	4.06	3.2	15.97
17	"Jiu-Jitsu, Bubble Wrap, and Yoo-Hoo"	April 5, 2018	1.9/8	11.66	1.2	4.02	3.1	15.69
18	"A Mother, A Child, and a Blue Man's Backside"	April 12, 2018	1.9/8	11.70	1.1	3.67	3.0	15.37
19	"Gluons, Guacamole, and the Color Purple"	April 19, 2018	1.9/8	11.67	1.1	3.89	3.0	15.56
20	"A Dog, A Squirrel, and a Fish Named Fish"	April 26, 2018	1.8/7	11.15	1.0	3.62	2.8	14.78
21	"Summer Sausage, a Pocket Poncho, and Tony Danza"	May 3, 2018	1.9/8	11.67	1.2	3.76	3.1	15.44
22	"Vanilla Ice Cream, Gentleman Callers, and a Dinette Set"	May 10, 2018	2.2/9	12.44	1.1	3.96	3.3	16.41

=== Season 2 ===
Viewership and ratings per episode of List of Young Sheldon episodes
No.	Title	Air date	Rating/share (18–49)	Viewers (millions)	DVR (18–49)	DVR viewers (millions)	Total (18–49)	Total viewers (millions)
1	"A High-Pitched Buzz and Training Wheels"	September 24, 2018	1.7/7	10.58	1.1	3.81	2.8	14.40
2	"A Rival Prodigy and Sir Isaac Neutron"	September 27, 2018	1.6/7	10.21	0.9	3.42	2.5	13.64
3	"A Crisis of Faith and Octopus Aliens"	October 4, 2018	1.8/9	10.68	1.0	3.54	2.8	14.23
4	"A Financial Secret and Fish Sauce"	October 11, 2018	1.8/8	11.18	0.9	3.32	2.7	14.51
5	"A Research Study and Czechoslovakian Wedding Pastries"	October 18, 2018	1.7/7	11.00	0.9	3.37	2.6	14.37
6	"Seven Deadly Sins and a Small Carl Sagan"	October 25, 2018	1.7/7	10.96	0.9	3.49	2.6	14.46
7	"Carbon Dating and a Stuffed Raccoon"	November 1, 2018	1.7/7	11.07	0.9	3.42	2.6	14.50
8	"An 8-Bit Princess and a Flat Tire Genius"	November 8, 2018	1.8/7	11.00	1.0	3.68	2.8	14.68
9	"Family Dynamics and a Red Fiero"	November 15, 2018	1.8/7	10.77	1.0	3.72	2.8	14.49
10	"A Stunted Childhood and a Can of Fancy Mixed Nuts"	December 6, 2018	1.6/7	10.91	1.0	3.57	2.6	14.48
11	"A Race of Superhumans and a Letter to Alf"	January 3, 2019	1.7/7	10.95	0.9	3.52	2.6	14.47
12	"A Tummy Ache and a Whale of a Metaphor"	January 10, 2019	1.9/8	12.05	0.8	3.27	2.7	15.33
13	"A Nuclear Reactor and a Boy Called Lovey"	January 17, 2019	1.7/7	11.46	1.0	3.62	2.7	15.09
14	"David, Goliath, and a Yoo-hoo from the Back"	January 31, 2019	1.8/8	11.58	0.8	3.19	2.7	14.78
15	"A Math Emergency and Perky Palms"	February 7, 2019	2.0/9	12.06	1.0	3.65	3.0	15.79
16	"A Loaf of Bread and a Grand Old Flag"	February 21, 2019	1.7/8	11.31	0.9	3.56	2.6	14.87
17	"Albert Einstein and the Story of Another Mary"	March 7, 2019	1.7/8	11.57	1.0	3.78	2.7	15.35
18	"A Perfect Score and a Bunsen Burner Marshmallow"	April 4, 2019	1.5/7	10.50	0.9	3.29	2.4	13.79
19	"A Political Campaign and a Candy Land Cheater"	April 25, 2019	1.4/7	10.46	0.9	3.52	2.3	13.98
20	"A Proposal and a Popsicle Stick Cross"	May 2, 2019	1.5/8	10.73	0.8	3.29	2.3	14.03
21	"A Broken Heart and a Crock Monster"	May 9, 2019	1.5/8	10.48	0.8	3.24	2.3	13.73
22	"A Swedish Science Thing and the Equation for Toast"	May 16, 2019	2.1/10	13.60	1.0	3.99	3.1	17.59

=== Season 3 ===
Viewership and ratings per episode of List of Young Sheldon episodes
No.	Title	Air date	Rating/share (18–49)	Viewers (millions)	DVR (18–49)	DVR viewers (millions)	Total (18–49)	Total viewers (millions)
1	"Quirky Eggheads and Texas Snow Globes"	September 26, 2019	1.1/6	8.24	0.7	3.00	1.8	11.24
2	"A Broom Closet and Satan's Monopoly Board"	October 3, 2019	1.0/6	8.35	0.6	2.70	1.6	11.05
3	"An Entrepreneurialist and a Swat on the Bottom"	October 10, 2019	1.0/5	7.63	0.6	2.85	1.6	10.48
4	"Hobbitses, Physicses and a Ball with Zip"	October 17, 2019	1.0/5	7.94	0.6	2.75	1.6	10.69
5	"A Pineapple and the Bosom of Male Friendship"	October 24, 2019	1.1/5	8.66	0.7	2.75	1.8	11.41
6	"A Parasol and a Hell of an Arm"	November 7, 2019	1.1/6	8.83	0.6	2.79	1.7	11.62
7	"Pongo Pygmaeus and a Culture that Encourages Spitting"	November 14, 2019	1.2/6	9.05	0.5	2.88	1.7	11.93
8	"The Sin of Greed and a Chimichanga from Chi-Chi's"	November 21, 2019	1.0/5	8.38	0.6	2.93	1.6	11.31
9	"A Party Invitation, Football Grapes and an Earth Chicken"	December 5, 2019	1.1/6	8.39	0.5	2.47	1.6	10.86
10	"Teenager Soup and a Little Ball of Fib"	December 12, 2019	1.0/6	8.21	0.5	2.60	1.5	10.81
11	"A Live Chicken, a Fried Chicken and Holy Matrimony"	January 9, 2020	1.0/5	7.57	0.6	3.02	1.6	10.59
12	"Body Glitter and a Mall Safety Kit"	January 16, 2020	1.0/6	8.88	0.5	2.58	1.5	11.46
13	"Contracts, Rules and a Little Bit of Pig Brains"	January 30, 2020	1.0/5	8.64	0.5	2.89	1.5	11.53
14	"A Slump, a Cross and Roadside Gravel"	February 6, 2020	1.0	8.98	0.5	2.55	1.5	11.53
15	"A Boyfriend's Ex-Wife and a Good Luck Head Rub"	February 13, 2020	1.0	8.89	0.5	2.78	1.5	11.67
16	"Pasadena"	February 20, 2020	1.0	9.11	0.5	2.64	1.5	11.75
17	"An Academic Crime and a More Romantic Taco Bell"	March 5, 2020	0.9	8.55	0.6	2.79	1.5	11.34
18	"A Couple Bruised Ribs and a Cereal Box Ghost Detector"	March 12, 2020	1.1	8.88	0.5	2.74	1.6	11.62
19	"A House for Sale and Serious Woman Stuff"	April 2, 2020	1.3	10.06	0.5	2.44	1.8	12.50
20	"A Baby Tooth and the Egyptian God of Knowledge"	April 16, 2020	1.0	9.57	0.6	2.65	1.6	12.22
21	"A Secret Letter and a Lowly Disc of Processed Meat"	April 30, 2020	1.1	10.14	0.5	2.49	1.6	12.64

=== Season 4 ===
Viewership and ratings per episode of List of Young Sheldon episodes
No.	Title	Air date	Rating (18–49)	Viewers (millions)	DVR (18–49)	DVR viewers (millions)	Total (18–49)	Total viewers (millions)
1	"Graduation"	November 5, 2020	0.7	6.77	0.5	2.54	1.2	9.31
2	"A Docent, A Little Lady and a Bouncer Named Dalton"	November 12, 2020	0.8	7.40	0.5	2.46	1.3	9.86
3	"Training Wheels and an Unleashed Chicken"	November 19, 2020	0.8	7.30	—N/a	—N/a	—N/a	—N/a
4	"Bible Camp and a Chariot of Love"	December 3, 2020	0.8	7.57	0.4	2.17	1.2	9.74
5	"A Musty Crypt and a Stick to Pee On"	December 17, 2020	0.7	6.86	—N/a	—N/a	—N/a	—N/a
6	"Freshman Orientation and the Inventor of the Zipper"	January 21, 2021	0.8	7.38	—N/a	—N/a	—N/a	—N/a
7	"A Philosophy Class and Worms That Can Chase You"	February 11, 2021	0.9	7.59	0.3	2.25	1.2	9.84
8	"An Existential Crisis and a Bear That Makes Bubbles"	February 18, 2021	0.8	7.72	0.3	2.06	1.1	9.78
9	"Crappy Frozen Ice Cream and an Organ Grinder's Monkey"	February 25, 2021	1.0	7.87	0.4	2.28	1.4	10.15
10	"Cowboy Aerobics and 473 Grease-Free Bolts"	March 4, 2021	0.9	7.71	0.4	2.19	1.3	9.90
11	"A Pager, a Club and a Cranky Bag of Wrinkles"	March 11, 2021	0.7	6.49	0.4	2.10	1.2	8.59
12	"A Box of Treasure and the Meemaw of Science"	April 1, 2021	0.7	6.64	0.3	1.63	1.0	8.27
13	"The Geezer Bus and a New Model for Education"	April 8, 2021	0.8	6.95	0.3	2.02	1.1	8.97
14	"Mitch's Son and the Unconditional Approval of a Government Agency"	April 15, 2021	0.8	7.46	—N/a	—N/a	—N/a	—N/a
15	"A Virus, Heartbreak and a World of Possibilities"	April 22, 2021	0.7	7.01	0.3	2.16	1.0	9.17
16	"A Second Prodigy and the Hottest Tips for Pouty Lips"	April 29, 2021	0.7	7.34	0.3	1.95	1.0	9.29
17	"A Black Hole"	May 6, 2021	0.6	6.64	0.3	2.10	0.9	8.74
18	"The Wild and Woolly World of Nonlinear Dynamics"	May 13, 2021	0.7	7.21	0.3	1.99	1.1	9.20

=== Season 5 ===
Viewership and ratings per episode of List of Young Sheldon episodes
No.	Title	Air date	Rating (18–49)	Viewers (millions)	DVR (18–49)	DVR viewers (millions)	Total (18–49)	Total viewers (millions)
1	"One Bad Night and Chaos of Selfish Desires"	October 7, 2021	0.7	7.12	—N/a	—N/a	—N/a	—N/a
2	"Snoopin' Around and the Wonder Twins of Atheism"	October 14, 2021	0.7	6.54	0.4	2.47	1.0	9.00
3	"Potential Energy and Hooch on a Park Bench"	October 21, 2021	0.6	6.36	0.3	2.42	1.0	8.78
4	"Pish Posh and a Secret Back Room"	October 28, 2021	0.7	7.23	—N/a	—N/a	—N/a	—N/a
5	"Stuffed Animals and A Sweet Southern Syzygy"	November 4, 2021	0.7	7.12	—N/a	—N/a	—N/a	—N/a
6	"Money Laundering and a Cascade of Hormones"	November 11, 2021	0.7	7.04	—N/a	—N/a	—N/a	—N/a
7	"An Introduction to Engineering and a Glob of Hair Gel"	November 18, 2021	0.7	6.95	0.3	2.19	1.0	9.14
8	"The Grand Chancellor and a Den of Sin"	December 2, 2021	0.6	6.59	0.3	2.28	1.0	8.87
9	"The Yips and an Oddly Hypnotic Bohemian"	December 9, 2021	0.7	6.96	0.3	2.02	0.9	8.98
10	"An Expensive Glitch and a Goof-Off Room"	January 6, 2022	0.7	7.39	—N/a	—N/a	—N/a	—N/a
11	"A Lock-In, a Weather Girl and a Disgusting Habit"	January 13, 2022	0.7	7.70	—N/a	—N/a	—N/a	—N/a
12	"A Pink Cadillac and a Glorious Tribal Dance"	January 20, 2022	0.8	7.98	—N/a	—N/a	—N/a	—N/a
13	"A Lot of Band-Aids and the Cooper Surrender"	January 27, 2022	0.7	7.73	—N/a	—N/a	—N/a	—N/a
14	"A Free Scratcher and Feminine Wiles"	February 24, 2022	0.6	6.95	—N/a	—N/a	—N/a	—N/a
15	"A Lobster, an Armadillo and a Way Bigger Number"	March 3, 2022	0.6	6.48	—N/a	—N/a	—N/a	—N/a
16	"A Suitcase Full of Cash and a Yellow Clown Car"	March 10, 2022	0.6	6.79	—N/a	—N/a	—N/a	—N/a
17	"A Solo Peanut, a Social Butterfly and the Truth"	March 31, 2022	0.6	6.93	—N/a	—N/a	—N/a	—N/a
18	"Babies, Lies and a Resplendent Cannoli"	April 14, 2022	0.6	6.85	—N/a	—N/a	—N/a	—N/a
19	"A God-Fearin' Baptist and a Hot Trophy Husband"	April 21, 2022	0.6	7.26	—N/a	—N/a	—N/a	—N/a
20	"Uncle Sheldon and a Hormonal Firecracker"	April 28, 2022	0.6	6.91	—N/a	—N/a	—N/a	—N/a
21	"White Trash, Holy Rollers and Punching People"	May 12, 2022	0.6	6.93	—N/a	—N/a	—N/a	—N/a
22	"A Clogged Pore, a Little Spanish and the Future"	May 19, 2022	0.7	7.06	—N/a	—N/a	—N/a	—N/a

=== Season 6 ===
Viewership and ratings per episode of List of Young Sheldon episodes
No.	Title	Air date	Rating (18–49)	Viewers (millions)	DVR (18–49)	DVR viewers (millions)	Total (18–49)	Total viewers (millions)
1	"Four Hundred Cartons of Undeclared Cigarettes and a Niblingo"	September 29, 2022	0.5	6.88	0.3	2.23	0.8	9.11
2	"Future Worf and the Margarita of the South Pacific"	October 6, 2022	0.5	6.96	0.3	2.15	0.8	9.11
3	"Passion's Harvest and a Sheldocracy"	October 13, 2022	0.7	7.25	0.3	2.10	1.0	9.35
4	"Blonde Ambition and the Concept of Zero"	October 20, 2022	0.6	6.80	0.3	1.94	0.8	8.74
5	"A Resident Advisor and the Riviera of the South"	October 27, 2022	0.6	7.07	0.3	2.13	0.8	9.20
6	"An Ugly Car, an Affair and Some Kickass Football"	November 3, 2022	0.6	6.89	0.3	2.27	0.9	9.15
7	"A Tougher Nut and a Note on File"	November 10, 2022	0.6	7.14	0.3	2.11	0.9	9.24
8	"Legalese and a Whole Hoo-Ha"	December 8, 2022	0.6	7.18	—N/a	—N/a	—N/a	—N/a
9	"College Dropouts and the Medford Miracle"	January 5, 2023	0.7	7.43	0.3	2.21	0.9	9.64
10	"Pancake Sunday and Textbook Flirting"	January 12, 2023	0.6	7.20	0.3	2.19	0.9	9.39
11	"Ruthless, Toothless, and a Week of Bed Rest"	February 2, 2023	0.6	7.31	—N/a	—N/a	—N/a	—N/a
12	"A Baby Shower and a Testosterone-Rich Banter"	February 9, 2023	0.7	7.73	—N/a	—N/a	—N/a	—N/a
13	"A Frat Party, a Sleepover and the Mother of All Blisters"	February 16, 2023	0.6	7.30	—N/a	—N/a	—N/a	—N/a
14	"A Launch Party and a Whole Human Being"	March 2, 2023	0.6	7.62	—N/a	—N/a	—N/a	—N/a
15	"Teen Angst and a Smart-Boy Walk of Shame"	March 9, 2023	0.7	7.66	—N/a	—N/a	—N/a	—N/a
16	"A Stolen Truck and Going on the Lam"	March 30, 2023	0.6	7.13	—N/a	—N/a	—N/a	—N/a
17	"A German Folk Song and an Actual Adult"	April 13, 2023	0.5	6.88	—N/a	—N/a	—N/a	—N/a
18	"Little Green Men and a Fella's Marriage Proposal"	April 27, 2023	0.5	7.20	—N/a	—N/a	—N/a	—N/a
19	"A New Weather Girl and a Stay-at-Home Coddler"	May 4, 2023	0.6	7.14	—N/a	—N/a	—N/a	—N/a
20	"German for Beginners and a Crazy Old Man with a Bat"	May 11, 2023	0.6	6.69	—N/a	—N/a	—N/a	—N/a
21	"A Romantic Getaway and a Germanic Meat-Based Diet"	May 18, 2023	0.6	6.89	—N/a	—N/a	—N/a	—N/a
22	"A Tornado, a 10-Hour Flight and a Darn Fine Ring"	May 18, 2023	0.6	6.97	—N/a	—N/a	—N/a	—N/a

=== Season 7 ===
Viewership and ratings per episode of List of Young Sheldon episodes
No.	Title	Air date	Rating (18–49)	Viewers (millions)	DVR (18–49)	DVR viewers (millions)	Total (18–49)	Total viewers (millions)
1	"A Wiener Schnitzel and Underwear in a Tree"	February 15, 2024	0.6	7.99	TBD	TBD	TBD	TBD
2	"A Roulette Wheel and a Piano Playing Dog"	February 22, 2024	0.5	7.14	TBD	TBD	TBD	TBD
3	"A Strudel and a Hot American Boy Toy"	February 29, 2024	0.5	7.10	TBD	TBD	TBD	TBD
4	"Ants on a Log and a Cheating Winker"	March 7, 2024	0.5	6.82	TBD	TBD	TBD	TBD
5	"A Frankenstein's Monster and a Crazy Church Guy"	March 14, 2024	0.5	6.52	0.2	1.74	0.7	8.26
6	"Baptists, Catholics and an Attempted Drowning"	April 4, 2024	0.4	6.74	0.3	2.34	0.7	9.08
7	"A Proper Wedding and Skeletons in the Closet"	April 11, 2024	0.6	7.35	TBD	TBD	TBD	TBD
8	"An Ankle Monitor and a Big Plastic Crap House"	April 18, 2024	0.5	7.15	0.2	1.98	0.7	9.05
9	"A Fancy Article and a Scholarship for a Baby"	April 25, 2024	0.4	6.86	0.2	2.07	0.7	8.93
10	"Community Service and the Key to a Happy Marriage"	May 2, 2024	0.5	7.17	0.2	2.03	0.7	9.20
11	"A Little Snip and Teaching Old Dogs"	May 9, 2024	0.4	6.65	0.3	2.15	0.7	8.80
12	"A New Home and a Traditional Texas Torture"	May 9, 2024	0.5	6.82	0.3	2.71	0.7	9.54
13	"Funeral"	May 16, 2024	0.7	9.15	0.3	2.20	1.0	11.34
14	"Memoir"	May 16, 2024	0.8	9.32	0.3	2.42	1.0	11.74
