= List of The Big Bang Theory guest stars =

This is a list of The Big Bang Theory guest stars. Most "played" themselves. The episodes in which they appeared are followed by the season in brackets.

== Actors ==
- Sean Astin as Dr. Greg Pemberton
  - "The Confirmation Polarization" (12)
  - "The Laureate Accumulation" (12)
  - "The Plagiarism Schism" (12)
- Kathy Bates as Mrs. Fowler, Amy Farrah Fowler's mother
  - "The Bow Tie Asymmetry" (11)
  - "The Conjugal Configuration" (12)
  - "The Consummation Deviation" (12)
- LeVar Burton
  - "The Toast Derivation" (4)
  - "The Habitation Configuration" (6)
  - "The Champagne Reflection" (8)
- Keith Carradine as Wyatt, Penny's father
  - "The Boyfriend Complexity" (4)
  - "The Bachelor Party Corrosion" (9)
  - "The Conjugal Conjecture" (10)
  - "The Procreation Calculation" (12)
  - "The Donation Oscillation" (12)
- Eliza Dushku as FBI Special Agent Angela Page
  - "The Apology Insufficiency" (4)
- Nathan Fillion
  - "The Comic Book Store Regeneration" (8)
- Carrie Fisher
  - "The Convention Conundrum" (7)
- Sarah Michelle Gellar
  - "The Stockholm Syndrome" (12)
- Summer Glau
  - "The Terminator Decoupling" (2)
- Judy Greer as Dr. Elizabeth Plimpton
  - "The Plimpton Stimulation" (3)
- Mark Hamill
  - "The Bow Tie Asymmetry" (11)
- Courtney Henggeler as Melissa Cooper, Sheldon's sister
  - "The Pork Chop Indeterminacy" (1)
  - "The Bow Tie Asymmetry" (11)
- James Earl Jones
  - "The Convention Conundrum" (7)
- Christopher Lloyd as Theodore, to whom Sheldon sublets his room
  - "The Property Division Collision" (10)
- Joe Manganiello
  - "The D&D Vortex" (12)
- Danica McKellar as Abby
  - "The Psychic Vortex" (3)
- Leonard Nimoy
  - "The Transporter Malfunction" (5, voice)
- Jerry O'Connell as George Cooper Jr., Sheldon's older brother
  - "The Sibling Realignment" (11)
  - "The Bow Tie Asymmetry" (11)
  - "The Tam Turbulence" (12)
- Jodi Lyn O'Keefe as Mikayla, a prostitute
  - "The Vegas Renormalization" (2)
- Kal Penn as Dr. Kevin Campbell
  - "The Confirmation Polarization" (12)
  - "The Laureate Accumulation" (12)
  - "The Plagiarism Schism" (12)
- Katee Sackhoff
  - "The Vengeance Formulation" (3)
  - "The Hot Troll Deviation" (4)
- Charlie Sheen
  - "The Griffin Equivalency" (2)
- William Shatner
  - "The D&D Vortex" (12)
- Kareem Abdul-Jabbar
  - "The D&D Vortex" (12)
- Kevin Smith
  - "The Fortification Implementation" (8)
  - "The D&D Vortex" (12)
- Octavia Spencer as a Department of Motor Vehicles employee
  - "The Euclid Alternative" (2)
- Brent Spiner
  - "The Russian Rocket Reaction" (5)
- June Squibb as Constance Cooper, Sheldon's grandmother
  - "The Meemaw Materialization" (9)
- George Takei
  - "The Hot Troll Deviation" (4)
- Billy Bob Thornton as Dr. Oliver Lorvis
  - "The Misinterpretation Agitation" (8)
- Analeigh Tipton
  - "The Panty Piñata Polarization" (2) as themself
  - “The Mystery Date Observation” (9) as Vanessa Bennett
- Jessica Walter as Mrs. Latham, a philanthropist
  - "The Benefactor Factor" (4)
- Adam West
  - "The Celebration Experimentation" (9)
- Steven Yeun
  - "The Staircase Implementation" (3)

== Athletes ==
- Kareem Abdul-Jabbar
  - "The D&D Vortex" (12)
- Rick Fox as Glenn, Bernadette's ex-boyfriend
  - "The Love Car Displacement" (4)

== Astronauts ==
- Buzz Aldrin
  - "The Holographic Excitation" (6)
- Mike Massimino
  - "The Friendship Contraction" (5)
  - "The Countdown Reflection" (5)
  - "The Decoupling Fluctuation" (6)
  - "The Re-Entry Minimization" (6)
  - "The Table Polarization" (7)
  - "The First Pitch Insufficiency" (8)

== Comedians ==
- Eric André as Joey
  - "The 21-Second Excitation" (4)
- Lewis Black as Professor Crawley
  - "The Jiminy Conjecture" (3)
- Ellen DeGeneres
  - "The Geology Elevation" (10)
  - "The Laureate Accumulation" (12)
- Howie Mandel
  - "The Re-entry Minimization" (6)
- Stephen Merchant as Dave Gibbs
  - "The Spock Resonance" (9)
  - "The Mystery Date Observation" (9)
  - "The Earworm Reverberation" (9)
- Michael Rapaport as Kenny Fitzgerald
  - "The Helium Insufficiency" (9)
- Bob Newhart as Arthur Jeffries, "Professor Proton"
  - "The Proton Resurgence" (6)
  - "The Proton Displacement" (7)
  - "The Proton Transmogrification" (7)
  - "The Opening Night Excitation" (9)
  - "The Proton Regeneration" (11)
  - "The Planetarium Collision" (12)
- Teller as Mr. Fowler, Amy Farrah Fowler's father
  - "The Bow Tie Asymmetry" (11)
  - "The Conjugal Configuration" (12)
  - "The Consummation Deviation" (12)

== Entrepreneurs ==
- Bill Gates
  - "The Gates Excitation" (11)
- Elon Musk
  - "The Platonic Permutation" (9)
- Steve Wozniak
  - "The Cruciferous Vegetable Amplification" (4)

== Scientists ==
- Frances Arnold
  - "The Laureate Accumulation" (12)
- Brian Greene
  - "The Herb Garden Germination" (4)
- Stephen Hawking
  - "The Hawking Excitation" (5)
  - "The Extract Obliteration" (6, voice)
  - "The Relationship Diremption" (7, voice)
  - "The Troll Manifestation" (8)
  - "The Celebration Experimentation" (9)
  - "The Geology Elevation" (10)
  - "The Proposal Proposal" (11)
- George Smoot
  - "The Terminator Decoupling" (2)
  - "The Laureate Accumulation" (12)
- Kip Thorne
  - "The Laureate Accumulation" (12)
- Neil deGrasse Tyson
  - "The Apology Insufficiency" (4)
  - "The Conjugal Configuration" (12)

== Others ==
- Ira Flatow
  - "The Vengeance Formulation" (3, voice)
  - "The Discovery Dissipation" (7)
  - "The Retraction Reaction" (11)
- Neil Gaiman
  - "The Comet Polarization" (11)
- Stan Lee
  - "The Excelsior Acquisition" (3)
- Adam Nimoy
  - "The Spock Resonance" (9)
- Bill Nye
  - "The Proton Displacement" (7)
  - "The Conjugal Configuration" (12)
