= The Big Bang Theory season 12 =

Final season of television series

The Big Bang Theory
- Season 12
- DVD cover art
- Showrunner: Steve Holland
- Starring: Johnny Galecki; Jim Parsons; Kaley Cuoco; Simon Helberg; Kunal Nayyar; Mayim Bialik; Melissa Rauch; Kevin Sussman
- No. of episodes: 24

Release
- Original network: CBS
- Original release: September 24, 2018 – May 16, 2019

Season chronology
- ← Previous; Season 11

The twelfth and final season of the American television sitcom The Big Bang Theory aired on CBS from September 24, 2018 to May 16, 2019.

== Production ==
In March 2017, the series was renewed for an eleventh and twelfth season, running through the 2018–19 television season.

Unlike the previous two seasons, the first episode of the twelfth season aired on a Monday before moving to Thursdays following CBS' contractual rights to air the Thursday Night Football games moving over to Fox.

On August 22, 2018, CBS and Warner Bros. Television officially announced that the twelfth season would be the series' last. This stemmed from Jim Parsons' decision to leave the series at the end of the twelfth season if the show were to have been renewed for a thirteenth season.

== Cast ==
=== Main cast ===
- Johnny Galecki as Dr. Leonard Hofstadter
- Jim Parsons as Dr. Sheldon Cooper
- Kaley Cuoco as Penny Hofstadter
- Simon Helberg as Howard Wolowitz
- Kunal Nayyar as Dr. Rajesh "Raj" Koothrappali
- Mayim Bialik as Dr. Amy Farrah Fowler
- Melissa Rauch as Dr. Bernadette Rostenkowski-Wolowitz
- Kevin Sussman as Stuart Bloom

=== Recurring cast ===
- Christine Baranski as Dr. Beverly Hofstadter
- Brian Posehn as Dr. Bertram "Bert" Kibbler
- Brian George as Dr. V.M. Koothrappali
- Lauren Lapkus as Denise
- Keith Carradine as Wyatt
- Rati Gupta as Anu
- Bob Newhart as Dr. Arthur Jeffries/Professor Proton
- Joshua Malina as President Siebert
- John Ross Bowie as Dr. Barry Kripke
- Brian Thomas Smith as Zack Johnson
- Lindsey Kraft as Marissa Johnson
- Kal Penn as Dr. Kevin Campbell
- Sean Astin as Dr. Greg Pemberton

=== Guest cast ===
- Teller as Larry Fowler
- Kathy Bates as Mrs. Fowler
- Neil deGrasse Tyson as himself
- Bill Nye as himself
- Jerry O'Connell as George Cooper Jr.
- Robert Wu as Tam Nguyen
- Maribeth Monroe as Dr. Lee
- Iain Armitage as Young Sheldon
- Lance Barber as George Cooper Sr.
- Montana Jordan as Young George Cooper Jr.
- Andy Daly as Nathan
- William Shatner as himself
- Wil Wheaton as himself
- Kevin Smith as himself
- Kareem Abdul-Jabbar as himself
- Joe Manganiello as himself
- Ellen DeGeneres as herself
- George Smoot as himself
- Kip Thorne as himself
- Frances H. Arnold as herself
- Regina King as Janine Davis
- Todd Giebenhain as Mitch
- Sarah Michelle Gellar as herself

== Episodes ==
No. overall	No. in season	Title	Directed by	Written by	Original release date	Prod. code	U.S. viewers (millions)
256	1	"The Conjugal Configuration"	Mark Cendrowski	Story by : Chuck Lorre & Eric Kaplan & Tara Hernandez; Teleplay by : Steve Holland & Maria Ferrari & Jeremy Howe	September 24, 2018	T12.16001	12.92
Sheldon and Amy go on their honeymoon, starting with Legoland California and then travelling to New York City. Sheldon's insistence on scheduling their marital relations stresses Amy. He says he only does it to remind himself to be intimate with her. They compromise by letting him make a schedule without sharing it with her. Leonard and Penny discover Mr. Larry Fowler (Teller) in Sheldon and Amy's apartment hiding from his wife (Kathy Bates). Leonard notices parallels in his own marriage, which offends Penny. Leonard apologizes and Penny convinces Mrs. Fowler to give her husband a break. When Mrs. Fowler wants to hang out with her regularly, Penny scares Larry out of the building. Raj instigates a Twitter feud with Neil deGrasse Tyson, but is scared off when confronted over the phone. Neil then calls Bill Nye to scare him, too.
257	2	"The Wedding Gift Wormhole"	Mark Cendrowski	Story by : Steve Holland & Steven Molaro & Maria Ferrari; Teleplay by : Dave Goetsch & Eric Kaplan & Andy Gordon	September 27, 2018	T12.16002	12.04
While opening their wedding gifts, Sheldon and Amy cannot figure out the purpose of the glass shard Leonard and Penny gave them. They decide it must be a clue to a scavenger hunt to the real gift. They eventually end up in the coffee shop where they first met and find a locket in the lost and found that they think must be the real gift. The glass shard was actually a crystal chakra wand that Raj gave as a gift to Howard and Bernadette, who then re-gifted it to Leonard and Penny, who finally passed it on as a joke. Leonard and Penny find it less funny when they are given a coded thank-you note they have to use to unlock their WiFi. After making out with his employee Denise at Sheldon and Amy's wedding reception, Stuart finally asks Denise out on a date; while preparing for the date, he has a spray-tan accident, but she just finds it funny and still goes out with him. Raj is depressed that everyone else has a relationship and asks his father to arrange a marriage for him.
258	3	"The Procreation Calculation"	Mark Cendrowski	Story by : Chuck Lorre & Tara Hernandez & Adam Faberman; Teleplay by : Steve Holland & Maria Ferrari & Anthony Del Broccolo	October 4, 2018	T12.16003	12.29
Raj meets with the woman his father set up for him, Anu. Her commanding personality and practical approach to marriage startle Raj, but he agrees to go ahead with it. Howard criticizes him, then apologizes; he just never expected Raj to give up on romance. Raj admits this to Anu, so she proposes to him and he says yes. Raj also sends out a relationship questionnaire to Leonard and Penny, which soon reveals that Penny does not think she ever wants kids, upsetting Leonard, who would like to have kids someday; their friends selfishly badger them on the issue. After telling her father Wyatt, who is also upset, Leonard tells Penny that he will be okay with it, as he never thought he would have her in his life. To get his mind off of it, Penny rents Leonard a Batmobile to drive in and have fun with for the day. Meanwhile, Stuart starts bringing home Denise at night, which makes Howard and Bernadette very uncomfortable. When they also try to make time for themselves, they wake up their kids.
259	4	"The Tam Turbulence"	Mark Cendrowski	Story by : Steve Holland & Steven Molaro & Maria Ferrari; Teleplay by : Dave Goetsch & Eric Kaplan & Jeremy Howe	October 11, 2018	T12.16004	12.94
Sheldon's childhood friend from Texas, Tam, is visiting the university with his son. Sheldon does not want to see him and the others wonder why Sheldon has never mentioned Tam. Tam is unaware Sheldon is angry with him, thinking they just naturally drifted apart. Sheldon's brother George does not know the reason either. Sheldon eventually reveals Tam promised he would move to California with Sheldon, but then got a girlfriend and stayed with her, leaving Sheldon feeling abandoned. Tam and Sheldon make up and Sheldon has Leonard take Tam to the airport. Meanwhile, Penny and Bernadette want to get to know Anu, impressed by her connections in the hotel industry. They tell her embarrassing things about Raj and wonder if they can go out with her again after Raj confronts them.
260	5	"The Planetarium Collision"	Mark Cendrowski	Story by : Eric Kaplan & Andy Gordon & Alex Ayers; Teleplay by : Steve Holland & Maria Ferrari & Tara Hernandez	October 18, 2018	T12.16005	12.22
Sheldon is annoyed that Amy does not have time to work on the super-asymmetry project with him, so he talks President Siebert into getting her removed from her own project at the university. Amy is angry at both of them, as she wants to still have her own identity outside the marriage. When confronted by Amy, Siebert apologizes to her, but states that it will be difficult for the university to give her her project back. After talking with Arthur Jeffries in a dream, Sheldon apologizes to Amy and both of them talk about their fears regarding their marriage. Meanwhile, Raj does not want to have Howard join him in his show at the planetarium, thinking he will just use his astronaut status to make it about himself. Raj eventually lets him join in and Raj and Howard spend the whole time complimenting each other, surprising Bernadette, Leonard, and Penny.
261	6	"The Imitation Perturbation"	Mark Cendrowski	Story by : Steve Holland & Maria Ferrari & Tara Hernandez; Teleplay by : Eric Kaplan & Jeremy Howe & Adam Faberman	October 25, 2018	T12.16006	12.99
Howard dresses as Sheldon for Halloween at work, hurting Sheldon's feelings, and refuses to apologize for it. Bernadette reveals to Amy that she made Howard's costume in retaliation for Sheldon ridiculing Howard's engineering and insulting Halley by comparing her appearance to Winston Churchill. Appalled at this, Sheldon and Amy dress as Howard and Bernadette at Penny and Leonard's party, angering Bernadette. Sheldon and Bernadette later bond over their painful childhood memories. Leonard is upset that Penny does not seem to remember that their first kiss was on Halloween in 2007. Penny later admits she does remember, but does not like to think of their first kiss as an unromantic drunken hookup. She likes to imagine their first kiss was one they shared on Leonard's 28th birthday, which pleases him.
262	7	"The Grant Allocation Derivation"	Mark Cendrowski	Story by : Eric Kaplan & Anthony Del Broccolo & Alex Yonks; Teleplay by : Steve Holland & Dave Goetsch & Maria Ferrari	November 1, 2018	T12.16007	12.64
President Siebert charges Leonard with distributing some extra university funds in the form of a grant. Everyone begins sucking up to Leonard. Penny is impressed by Leonard's decisiveness, but unimpressed when he cannot decide between Raj, Kripke, and Dr. Lee (Maribeth Monroe), an ornithologist who works with crows. Leonard, realizing that people will be angry with him no matter who he gives the funds to, eventually awards the money to himself for a high-powered laser. Meanwhile, a stressed out Bernadette starts hiding in Halley's playhouse after work so she can have time to herself. She is eventually joined by Penny and Amy. Howard reveals to Raj that he actually knows that Bernadette has been hiding out, but is keeping quiet about it so she can have her privacy and so he can use it to his advantage.
263	8	"The Consummation Deviation"	Mark Cendrowski	Story by : Chuck Lorre & Steve Holland & Maria Ferrari; Teleplay by : Eric Kaplan & Andy Gordon & Adam Faberman	November 8, 2018	T12.16008	12.85
Anu wants to have sex with Raj, but he gets so nervous in the lead-up that his selective mutism returns. Confessing to her, she is very understanding, revealing an unusual secret of her own. The next morning, he is able to have sex with her in the shower. Sheldon attempts to bond with his father-in-law, but Larry is more impressed with Howard's magic tricks, causing a jealous Sheldon to spend time with Mrs. Fowler. They bond after finding out Amy has been using Sheldon as an excuse to avoid her mother, though he does gently advise her to forgive her daughter like he would his wife. A remorseful Amy invites the Fowlers over for dinner, where Sheldon and Mrs. Fowler continue to bond over Larry's ineptitude with magic.
264	9	"The Citation Negation"	Kristy Cecil	Story by : Eric Kaplan & Tara Hernandez & Jeremy Howe; Teleplay by : Steve Holland & Dave Goetsch & Maria Ferrari	November 15, 2018	T12.16009	12.56
Sheldon and Amy recruit Leonard to research and write citations for their paper on super-asymmetry. While working in the campus library, Leonard and Raj discover a Russian paper that asserts that super-asymmetry has no merit. Reluctantly, Leonard shares the news with Sheldon and Amy, who fall into a depressive state and do not leave their apartment. Meanwhile, Bernadette asks Denise to teach her how to play Fortnite: Battle Royale so that she can beat Howard. Despite losing to Howard in a rematch after all of her training, Bernadette revels in beating a disinterested Penny.
265	10	"The VCR Illumination"	Mark Cendrowski	Story by : Steve Holland & Steven Molaro & Bill Prady; Teleplay by : Maria Ferrari & Andy Gordon & Jeremy Howe	December 6, 2018	T12.16010	12.52
Sheldon is still despondent over the disproving of his and Amy's theory on asymmetry. Leonard brings out a VHS tape of a pep talk that Sheldon recorded as a boy in case he ever needed to cheer himself up, but it turns out that his late father had recorded a long-ago football game over it. However, Sheldon is buoyed by a halftime pep talk his father gave the team (despite the fact that they still went on to lose the game), realizing he and his father had more in common than he previously thought. This causes Amy to view asymmetry and symmetry in another manner and they decide their theory may not be dead after all. After Amy leaves, Sheldon briefly stays behind and thanks his father for inspiring him, promising to "give them hell". Meanwhile, Bernadette finds an old tape of Howard preparing to audition for The Magic Castle. She insists he fulfill his dream and audition with her as a coach, drawing on her beauty pageant experience, which only makes Howard miserable. Howard eventually decides to audition his own way and promptly botches his chances by accidentally destroying a judge's Rolex during a botched trick.
266	11	"The Paintball Scattering"	Mark Cendrowski	Story by : Maria Ferrari & Tara Hernandez & Adam Faberman; Teleplay by : Steve Holland & Eric Kaplan & Anthony Del Broccolo	January 3, 2019	T12.16011	12.80
Sheldon and Amy's paper is a huge success, but Sheldon is upset when President Siebert does not allow him to do interviews with Amy, who gets all the attention. Denise asks Stuart to move in with her, but he panics and flees. Raj sets up a doorbell camera app for Anu, but accidentally sees her greet her ex-boyfriend as he arrives to collect his things. At a paintball match, all the conflicts reach a boiling point, with Raj saying he cannot trust Anu since he does not even know her, throwing the wedding into question. Stuart makes up with Denise by giving her a key to the Wolowitz house. Sheldon tries to do one interview with Amy, but leaves when he is asked about the Russian scientists who had earlier disproved their theory.
267	12	"The Propagation Proposition"	Mark Cendrowski	Story by : Chuck Lorre & Steve Holland & Jeremy Howe; Teleplay by : Maria Ferrari & Dave Goetsch & Eric Kaplan	January 10, 2019	T12.16012	13.53
Penny runs into her ex-boyfriend Zack, who has gotten rich from selling his company and is now married to a similarly dim-witted woman named Marissa. He invites Leonard and Penny for dinner on their boat. Zack reveals he is infertile and he and Marissa ask Leonard to donate his sperm so they can have a baby. Leonard is flattered, but Penny finds it creepy. Leonard says that since Penny decided she did not want to have children, he should be allowed to help another couple with this issue. Sheldon advises him to think about the emotional toll this could have on him. Leonard says he will not do it if Penny objects; Penny says she will support whatever decision Leonard makes. Meanwhile, Raj tries to get Anu back, but she points out he just wanted to be married like his friends. Raj points out that Anu is similarly looking for a quick marriage. He admits to Anu that he really likes her and they decide to start their relationship as just dating.
268	13	"The Confirmation Polarization"	Mark Cendrowski	Story by : Eric Kaplan & Andy Gordon & Anthony Del Broccolo; Teleplay by : Steve Holland & Maria Ferrari & Tara Hernandez	January 17, 2019	T12.16013	13.32
Two physicists from Chicago, Dr. Kevin Campbell and Dr. Greg Pemberton, accidentally prove Sheldon and Amy's super-asymmetry theory. This puts them on track for a Nobel Prize, but Leonard points out they tend to go to the experimental scientists who prove a concept instead of theorists like Sheldon who come up with it. Meeting with them, they tell Sheldon they are willing to share the Prize, but only three names can be on the submission and they want to cut Amy out. Amy does not want to prevent Sheldon's lifelong dream, but he goes to President Siebert, who agrees to fight for Amy on their behalf. Meanwhile, Bernadette's drug has been approved and she wants to promote Penny to lead the marketing team. Penny resists, knowing Bernadette's attitude at work and concerned by her own inexperience in taking responsibility, but Bernadette uses reverse-psychology to get Penny to take the job. Penny mirrors Bernadette's commanding style to get the other employees in line, impressing Bernadette.
269	14	"The Meteorite Manifestation"	Mark Cendrowski	Story by : Chuck Lorre & Steve Holland & Maria Ferrari; Teleplay by : Eric Kaplan & Tara Hernandez & Jeremy Howe	January 31, 2019	T12.16014	13.66
Howard and Bernadette's new neighbor Andy begins using motion sensored floodlights mounted on his balcony, which encroaches on their rear deck and hot tub. Investigating whether the lights comply with city code, they enlist Sheldon to help them with the paperwork, but Sheldon finds out Howard and Bernadette's own deck is also not code-compliant. He considers turning them in, but ultimately chooses friendship over the rules. He does report Andy, though, for violating property lines, allowing Howard and Bernadette to enjoy their deck again. Meanwhile, Bert wants to cut into a meteorite with Raj's help, rejecting Leonard's idea to use his laser to do so. Leonard gets the flu and dreams that he opens the meteorite with his laser, becomes possessed by an alien parasite and eats Bert, Raj, and Penny. He later apologizes to Raj and Bert, admitting he was jealous. The possibility of the meteorite unleashing a plague scares Stuart and Denise, who use it as foreplay for procreation, Stuart closing the store on Sheldon when he tries to browse.
270	15	"The Donation Oscillation"	Mark Cendrowski	Story by : Bill Prady & Jeremy Howe & Adam Faberman; Teleplay by : Steve Holland & Dave Goetsch & Maria Ferrari	February 7, 2019	T12.16015	13.97
Leonard tells Zack and Marissa he will father their child, but Penny tries to seduce him, despite knowing he has to be abstinent for a few days. Her visiting father, Wyatt, points out her actions suggest she is more conflicted over having no kids than she lets on, which she admits. Wyatt says he will support her no matter what. Meanwhile, Sheldon and Amy warn Leonard about Penny's reservations and that he will not be allowed to raise a child that is not his. Leonard decides not to go through with it; he tells Zack to ask Sheldon be the donor, but Amy forbids it. Meanwhile, Howard turns Raj's cancelled bachelor party into a couples' trip in a zero-gravity aircraft, though he is convinced that Bernadette would hate it. Bernadette tries to get out of it, so Howard sits out, forcing Bernadette to go through with it just to prove him wrong, though she does not enjoy it.
271	16	"The D&D Vortex"	Mark Cendrowski	Story by : Steve Holland & Maria Ferrari & Anthony Del Broccolo; Teleplay by : Eric Kaplan & Andy Gordon & Tara Hernandez	February 21, 2019	T12.16016	13.48
Wil Wheaton brings William Shatner on his Professor Proton show to meet Sheldon, who gets so excited that he vomits on Shatner. Going to Wil to apologize, he finds Wil hosts a Dungeons & Dragons group with his celebrity friends, including Shatner. Finding out Stuart is in the group and never told them, the guys make Stuart panic and quit. Wil secretly invites Leonard, who discovers that the group (besides Shatner) also includes Kevin Smith, Joe Manganiello, and Kareem Abdul-Jabbar. Leonard tells Penny, who tells Amy and Bernadette, all three women having a crush on Manganiello. Because of that indiscretion, Wil kicks out Leonard and admonishes the guys for using him for his connections, saying that one of the worst things about being a celebrity is not knowing whether someone will like him for himself. To apologize, the guys invite Wil to play D&D with them at Leonard’s apartment, but Wil, secretly in the middle of a game with Penny, Amy, Bernadette, and the group, politely turns them down before allowing the girls to send them a photo of the event as payback.
272	17	"The Conference Valuation"	Mark Cendrowski	Story by : Chuck Lorre & Steven Molaro & Eric Kaplan; Teleplay by : Steve Holland & Maria Ferrari & Jeremy Howe	March 7, 2019	T12.16017	12.99
Penny and Bernadette attend a pharmaceuticals conference, where Bernadette's business rival Danny tries to recruit Penny. Bernadette is offended that Penny is considering the offer. At the meeting with Danny, Bernadette steps in to say Penny is the best saleswoman she knows and Penny agrees to keep working for Bernadette. Meanwhile, the rest of the gang does simple behavioral experiments on the Wolowitz children using a book Sheldon found. Leonard is shocked that his childhood was filled with these experiments; although his mother remembers that time with him fondly, she admits the experiment with him is not over. Raj figures Amy planted the book to get Sheldon to like babies, though Sheldon later states he would be open to having kids.
273	18	"The Laureate Accumulation"	Mark Cendrowski	Story by : Steve Holland & Adam Faberman & David Saltzberg; Teleplay by : Dave Goetsch & Eric Kaplan & Maria Ferrari	April 4, 2019	T12.16018	12.22
Campbell and Pemberton start a publicity tour for their Nobel campaign, including appearing on The Ellen DeGeneres Show. Caltech organizes a reception for Amy and Sheldon and reaches out to previous winners, including George Smoot, Kip Thorne, and Frances H. Arnold. Finding that Sheldon has offended most of them in the past, Amy and Sheldon try to get their good graces by sending them baked cookies which they all reject. Leonard and Penny convince them to show up to the reception, but Pemberton and Campbell crash the party. Leonard holds Sheldon back, only for Amy to verbally snap at them. Meanwhile, with Halley scared of the dark, Stuart and Bernadette turn Howard's story from his time in outer space into a children's book, The Frightened Little Astronaut. Howard is embarrassed as he finds the story emasculating until Bernadette talks him into helping both children and Stuart's art career by letting it get published.
274	19	"The Inspiration Deprivation"	Mark Cendrowski	Story by : Eric Kaplan & Maria Ferrari & Andy Gordon; Teleplay by : Steve Holland & Anthony Del Broccolo & Tara Hernandez	April 18, 2019	T12.16019	11.44
Sheldon and Amy are lectured by Mrs. Davis and President Siebert for jeopardizing their chance of winning the Nobel Prize over Amy's outburst. Amy would be the fourth woman to win in Physics, pressuring her to be a role model for women everywhere. To calm down, they try a sensory deprivation tank; Sheldon loves it, but it only worsens Amy's mood. Sheldon does not know how to help and ends up holding her while singing "Soft Kitty". A newly confident Amy goes back to Human Resources to be allowed to campaign again and shares a drink with Davis. Meanwhile, Howard buys a scooter to ride with Raj like in the old days. Bernadette finds out and makes him sell it, since it is too dangerous. Bert buys it and ends up meeting a nurse after he dislocates his arm in a wreck.
275	20	"The Decision Reverberation"	Mark Cendrowski	Story by : Steven Molaro & Steve Holland & Tara Hernandez; Teleplay by : Eric Kaplan & Maria Ferrari & Jermey Howe	April 25, 2019	T12.16020	11.84
When Penny tells Leonard he needs to be more assertive in making decisions for himself, he starts standing up to Sheldon over small things. His confidence makes him demand that the university support his idea for a plasma physics project. He threatens to quit if the university refuses, alarming both Sheldon and Penny, who consider this to be a risky career move. Sheldon is conflicted on whether or not he is being selfish over Leonard's decision, but Amy suggests that the fact that he is worried over Leonard's motivation proves that he does care about him, which he acknowledges. President Siebert refuses the project but, in order not to lose Leonard, gives him co-leadership over a photon entanglement project, leaving Leonard proud of himself and Penny impressed. Meanwhile, Raj shows Anu his lab and suggests one possible answer for something he has seen in space might be alien life. When someone mentions this at his observatory presentation, the scientific community starts mocking him as a conspiracy theorist. Raj points out scientists should consider all possibilities when seeking the truth, though this causes people to think he believes in the Loch Ness Monster.
276	21	"The Plagiarism Schism"	Nikki Lorre	Story by : Eric Kaplan & Maria Ferrari & Adam Faberman; Teleplay by : Steve Holland & Dave Goetsch & Tara Hernandez	May 2, 2019	T12.16021	12.48
Kripke offers to get proof that Pemberton plagiarized his thesis (as he thinks Pemberton to be a weasel), which would destroy his career and his chances at the Nobel Prize. Sheldon and Amy decide not to pursue this; they want to win on their own merits. Leonard secretly obtains the information from Kripke to expose Pemberton. Amy and Sheldon give the evidence to Pemberton and Campbell, as they refuse to blackmail them. Having been unaware of this, Campbell is furious that Pemberton's dishonesty could hurt his own career. Campbell then reveals he is sleeping with Pemberton's ex-wife, causing the pair to brawl. Afterwards, Campbell exposes Pemberton, getting Pemberton fired. Amy and Sheldon reject a drunken Campbell's request to join their team. Bernadette tells Howard that another waitress at the Cheesecake Factory was attracted to him back in the day, so she said Howard had hepatitis to scare her off. At first, Howard obsesses over who it was, but he tells Bernadette she is the only one that matters to him.
277	22	"The Maternal Conclusion"	Kristy Cecil	Story by : Steve Holland & Eric Kaplan & Jeremy Howe; Teleplay by : Maria Ferrari & Andy Gordon & Anthony Del Broccolo	May 9, 2019	T12.16022	12.59
Leonard's mother Beverly visits and he is thrilled when she takes an interest in his work as co-lead for the University's Photon Entanglement Project. However, when he learns that she is only being nice to him for research on a new parenting book, he is furious. He prepares to tell her how she let him down over the years, but instead chooses to accept and forgive her, and forgive himself for holding on to that resentment for so long. Beverly is touched that he forgave her and they share a genuine hug. Meanwhile, Anu gets a job offer in London. Raj prepares to fly out and propose to her, ready to follow her if she accepts. Howard stops Raj at the airport, saying there is a better match out there for him and convincing Raj to return home. Stuart and Denise are bothered by her creepy roommate Mitch, while Bernadette and Howard are tired of Denise constantly staying overnight with Stuart at their house. Stuart and Denise decide to move in together, admitting they love each other while convincing Mitch to move out.
278	23	"The Change Constant"	Mark Cendrowski	Chuck Lorre & Steve Holland & Steven Molaro & Bill Prady & Dave Goetsch & Eric Kaplan & Maria Ferrari & Andy Gordon & Anthony Del Broccolo & Tara Hernandez & Jeremy Howe & Adam Faberman	May 16, 2019	T12.16023	18.52
The episode opens with a short montage of clips from the series' twelve seasons, then segues to Sheldon and Amy, who are up late waiting for a call from the Nobel Committee. Following a prank call from Kripke, they are told they have won the Nobel Prize in Physics for their super-asymmetry work. The sudden attention from the media and the university bothers Sheldon, while Amy is saddened by unflattering pictures of her in the news. Seeing her dispirited, Raj convinces her to get a makeover. She loves her new look, but a rattled Sheldon demands she change it back. He then flees when he sees Penny emerge from the newly repaired elevator. Sheldon and Penny go to the Cheesecake Factory and Penny tells Sheldon that change is the only constant thing in life, so Sheldon finally accepts the changes in his life. On TV, they see Bernadette and Howard claim to be Sheldon and Amy's best friends. Raj and Leonard defend Amy, with Leonard accidentally breaking Sheldon's DNA molecule model in Apartment 4A. In the end, Penny convinces Sheldon to ride in the elevator.
279	24	"The Stockholm Syndrome"	Mark Cendrowski	Chuck Lorre & Steve Holland & Steven Molaro & Bill Prady & Dave Goetsch & Eric Kaplan & Maria Ferrari & Andy Gordon & Anthony Del Broccolo & Tara Hernandez & Jeremy Howe & Adam Faberman	May 16, 2019	T12.16024	18.52
After Sheldon and Leonard spend two months repairing Sheldon's DNA molecule model, everyone prepares to fly to Sweden for the Nobel Prize award ceremony. Howard and Bernadette nervously leave their kids for the first time with Stuart and Denise, while Raj leaves his dog with Bert. Penny has become pregnant, though she and Leonard are keeping it a secret. On the flight, Raj meets Sarah Michelle Gellar. Penny's frequent bathroom trips make Sheldon fear she is sick. Penny reveals her pregnancy to Sheldon but, instead of being excited for her, Sheldon is only selfishly relieved that he will not get sick, and he exposes the pregnancy, offending Leonard. At the hotel, a series of minor incidents with their kids make Howard and Bernadette want to go home. Much to their dismay, Sheldon is still insensitive. Amy furiously tells Sheldon he broke his friends' hearts and that people (sometimes including her) only tolerate him because he does not intentionally do so. Everyone decides to stay for the ceremony and Raj brings Gellar as a plus-one. After they are awarded their medals, Amy encourages girls to pursue science while Sheldon thanks his family and then, discarding the extensively long, ego-centered acceptance speech that he wrote as a child, individually acknowledges each of his friends and Amy as his other family who always support him, apologizing to all of them for not being the friend they deserved. In the last scene in the episode and the series, the gang is eating in Apartment 4A (an allusion to the final scene in the opening credits) with Sheldon and Amy wearing their medals as a slow acoustic version of the series' theme song's chorus plays.

== Ratings ==
Viewership and ratings per episode of The Big Bang Theory season 12
No.	Title	Air date	Rating/share (18–49)	Viewers (millions)	DVR (18–49)	DVR viewers (millions)	Total (18–49)	Total viewers (millions)
1	"The Conjugal Configuration"	September 24, 2018	2.5/11	12.92	1.7	5.29	4.2	18.22
2	"The Wedding Gift Wormhole"	September 27, 2018	2.2/10	12.04	1.6	4.82	3.8	16.86
3	"The Procreation Calculation"	October 4, 2018	2.2/10	12.29	1.6	4.85	3.8	17.14
4	"The Tam Turbulence"	October 11, 2018	2.3/10	12.94	1.4	4.41	3.7	17.32
5	"The Planetarium Collision"	October 18, 2018	2.1/9	12.22	1.5	4.56	3.6	16.78
6	"The Imitation Perturbation"	October 25, 2018	2.3/10	12.99	1.4	4.56	3.6	17.56
7	"The Grant Allocation Derivation"	November 1, 2018	2.1/10	12.64	1.5	4.43	3.7	17.08
8	"The Consummation Deviation"	November 8, 2018	2.3/10	12.85	1.7	5.07	4.0	17.92
9	"The Citation Negation"	November 15, 2018	2.3/10	12.56	1.5	4.78	3.9	17.35
10	"The VCR Illumination"	December 6, 2018	2.1/10	12.52	1.6	4.76	3.7	17.29
11	"The Paintball Scattering"	January 3, 2019	2.2/10	12.80	1.4	4.41	3.6	17.21
12	"The Propagation Proposition"	January 10, 2019	2.4/11	13.53	1.5	4.48	3.9	18.01
13	"The Confirmation Polarization"	January 17, 2019	2.3/10	13.32	1.5	4.45	3.8	17.78
14	"The Meteorite Manifestation"	January 31, 2019	2.4/11	13.66	1.5	4.52	3.9	18.18
15	"The Donation Oscillation"	February 7, 2019	2.6/12	13.97	1.4	4.69	4.0	18.66
16	"The D & D Vortex"	February 21, 2019	2.3/11	13.48	1.5	4.75	3.8	18.23
17	"The Conference Valuation"	March 7, 2019	2.1/10	12.99	1.5	4.62	3.6	17.61
18	"The Laureate Accumulation"	April 4, 2019	2.0/11	12.22	1.4	4.45	3.4	16.67
19	"The Inspiration Deprivation"	April 18, 2019	1.9/11	11.44	1.4	4.39	3.3	15.84
20	"The Decision Reverberation"	April 25, 2019	1.8/9	11.84	1.4	4.60	3.2	16.45
21	"The Plagiarism Schism"	May 2, 2019	1.9/10	12.48	1.4	4.42	3.3	16.91
22	"The Maternal Conclusion"	May 9, 2019	2.0/11	12.59	1.5	4.91	3.5	17.50
23	"The Change Constant"	May 16, 2019	3.2/17	18.52	1.8	6.22	5.0	24.75
24	"The Stockholm Syndrome"	May 16, 2019	3.2/17	18.52	1.8	6.22	5.0	24.75

== Special ==
A retrospective, Unraveling the Mystery: A Big Bang Farewell, hosted by Johnny Galecki and Kaley Cuoco, aired at 9:30 P.M. ET/PT, the night of the finale, following the season two finale of Young Sheldon, and the series finale of The Big Bang Theory. The special was also included on the DVD and Blu-Ray releases of the season.
