= The Conjugal Configuration =

- The Big Bang Theory episode
- Episode no.: Season 12; Episode 1
- Directed by: Mark Cendrowski
- Story by: Chuck Lorre; Eric Kaplan; Tara Hernandez
- Teleplay by: Steve Holland; Maria Ferrari; Jeremy Howe
- Production code: T12.16001
- Original air date: September 24, 2018

Guest appearances
- Giovanni Bejarano as Bellman; Ciara Renée as Sunny Morrow; Andy Kim as tour guide; Kathy Bates as Amy's mother; Teller as Amy's father

Episode chronology
← Previous "The Bow Tie Asymmetry"	Next → "The Wedding Gift Wormhole"
- The Big Bang Theory season 12

"The Conjugal Configuration" is the first episode of the twelfth and final season of the American television sitcom The Big Bang Theory, and the 256th episode of the series overall. The episode first aired on CBS on September 24, 2018.

== Plot ==
After their honeymoon starts at Legoland California, Sheldon and Amy head to New York City. Sheldon's insistence on scheduling their marital relations stresses Amy. He says he only does it to remind himself to be intimate with her. They compromise by letting him make a schedule without sharing it with her. Leonard and Penny discover Mr. Larry Fowler in Sheldon and Amy's apartment hiding from his wife. Leonard notices parallels in his own marriage, which offends Penny. Leonard apologizes, and he and Penny reconcile. Penny convinces Mrs. Fowler to give her husband a break. When Mrs. Fowler wants to hang out with her regularly, Penny scares Larry out of the building. Raj instigates a Twitter feud with Neil deGrasse Tyson but is scared off when confronted over the phone. Neil then calls Bill Nye.

== Production ==
=== Casting ===
In July 2018 at San Diego Comic Con, it was confirmed that Kathy Bates and Teller would reprise their roles as Amy's parents.

== Reception ==
=== Ratings ===
The episode was watched live by 12.92 million viewers, and had a ratings share of 2.5/11, during its original broadcast.

The episode attracted a total of 2,262,000 viewers within seven-days of its British premiere, making it the most watched programme on E4 for the week.

=== Critical response ===
Caroline Preece of Den of Geek complimented the guest appearance of Neil Degrasse Tyson. However, Preece criticized the episode's lack of humor and boredom, as well as the lack of character development due to the same arguments occurring.

Kyle Fowle of Entertainment Weekly rated the episode C+, criticizing the "familiar nature of the episode". Fowle also noted that this episode felt like a mid-season episode, lacking the magic a premiere should have, but expressed cautious optimism about the rest of the season.
