= Soft Kitty =

Song popularized in the American sitcom, The Big Bang Theory

"Soft Kitty" is a children's song popularized by the characters Sheldon Cooper, Penny, Leonard Hofstadter, Mary Cooper, and Amy Farrah Fowler (who sang the song in English, German, and Mandarin) in the 2007-2019 American sitcom The Big Bang Theory, and which elsewhere may be rendered as "Warm Kitty." It is described by Sheldon as a song that his mother (Mary) sang to him when he was ill.

The lyrics on The Big Bang Theory are: "Soft kitty, warm kitty, little ball of fur / Happy kitty, sleepy kitty, purr purr purr". A scene in an episode of Young Sheldon, the prequel series to The Big Bang Theory, depicts the origin of the song. This aired on February 1, 2018, and shows Mary singing the song to her son, who is suffering with the flu.

A 2015 copyright lawsuit alleged the words to "Warm Kitty" were written by Edith Newlin; however, the lawsuit was dismissed because the court found that the plaintiffs failed to show they had a valid claim.

== Origin ==
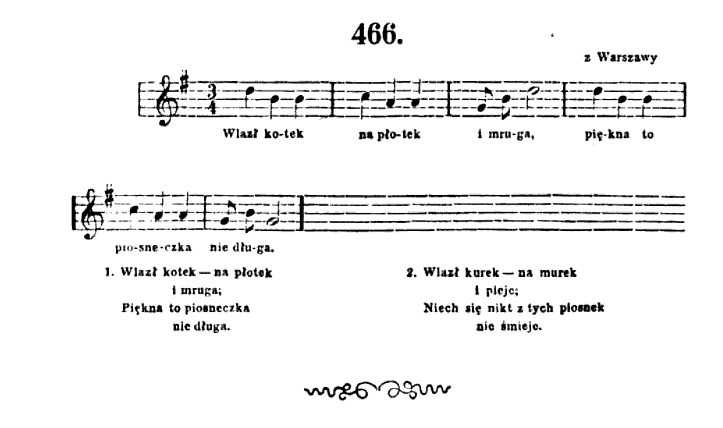
"Wlazł kotek na płotek" as it appears in Pieśniach ludu polskiego (1857)

The song is originally based on a Polish lullaby, "Wlazł kotek na płotek" ("The kitten climbed the fence"). The lyrics were noted by folklorist Oskar Kolberg in 1837, and the tune was first published by Stanisław Moniuszko in 1849, based on a Polish folksong. Władysław Syrokomla and Wiktor Każyński published a version of this song in 1857, in Pieśniach ludu polskiego ("Songs of the Polish people").

The 1972 Tom Glazer album Music For 1's & 2's features the song under the title "Nice"

Versions of the song have been released by Australian children's performer Patsy Biscoe, and by the long-running ABC children's program Play School—a recording sung by Philip Quast and Barbara Frawley was released on the show's 1993 album The Best of Play School, which predates The Big Bang Theory and has the lyrics reversed, instead going: "Warm kitty, soft kitty, little ball of fur. Sleepy kitty, happy kitty, purr purr purr." The song remains part of Play School's catalog of children's songs regularly performed on the program: the show's presenters occasionally perform the song for their young viewers.

== Copyright lawsuit ==
In December 2015, the heirs of Edith Newlin filed a lawsuit against the various companies associated with The Big Bang Theory, claiming that the words and music to the song appeared in the book Songs for the Nursery School published in 1937 by Willis Music Company, based on a poem by Newlin; the copyright to the book was renewed in 1964. The website for Willis Music states:

In 1937 we published a book called Songs for the Nursery School and we sold tens of thousands of copies. It is a hardbound book of over 150 songs for children. The book was written by Laura Pendleton MacCarteney. In that book on page 27 is 'Warm Kitty'.... Warner Brothers and I worked together to secure the rights for the show The Big Bang Theory and they have been using the song ever since.

The suit by Newlin's daughters, on the other hand, claimed that they held the copyright. Furthermore, they alleged that they did not authorize the use of the lyrics, that Willis Music did not have permission to authorize others to use the lyrics, and that the lyrics had been used not only in the television series but on various kinds of program-associated merchandise without proper permission.

On March 27, 2017, US District Court Judge Naomi Reice Buchwald dismissed the suit, holding that the plaintiffs had not shown that they held a copyright on their mother's lyrics: "They have failed to establish that they own a valid copyright as necessary to state a copyright infringement claim."
