= Robert Wolcott =

Robert Wolcott is the name of a fictional character in:

- The Reclusive Potential
- Zapped!
