= The Proposal Proposal =

- The Big Bang Theory episode
- Episode no.: Season 11; Episode 1
- Directed by: Mark Cendrowski
- Story by: Chuck Lorre; Eric Kaplan; Jeremy Howe
- Teleplay by: Steve Holland; Maria Ferrari; Tara Hernandez
- Production code: T12.15601
- Original air date: September 25, 2017

Guest appearances
- George Wyner as Dr. Zhang; Susan Chuang as Dr. Harris

Episode chronology
← Previous "The Long Distance Dissonance"	Next → "The Retraction Reaction"
- The Big Bang Theory (season 11)

"The Proposal Proposal" is the first episode of the eleventh season, and 232nd episode overall of The Big Bang Theory. It first aired on CBS on September 25, 2017.

== Plot ==
Amy enthusiastically accepts Sheldon's marriage proposal. However, when dining with Amy's colleagues later that night, Sheldon is offended that they are more impressed with Amy's work than his own. With help from Stephen Hawking, Sheldon later comes to grips with the fact that he will not always be the center of attention in the marriage. Bernadette is shocked to realize that she is pregnant again. She and Howard are not thrilled at the idea of having another baby so soon after their first. They attempt to convince Leonard and Penny to have a child as well but are rebuffed.

== Reception ==
=== Ratings ===
The episode was watched live by 17.65 million viewers, and had a ratings share of 4.1/16, during its original broadcast.

The episode attracted 2,182,000 viewers upon its British premiere, making it the most watched programme on E4 for the week.

=== Critical response ===
Jesse Schedeen of IGN rated the episode 5.9, complimenting how the episode "handled Sheldon's proposal" but criticized how the show has become stale after its ten-year run.

Caroline Preece of Den of Geek criticized how tired Sheldon not understanding his own arrogance and narcissism is.
