= The Stockholm Syndrome (The Big Bang Theory) =

- The Big Bang Theory episode
- Episode no.: Season 12; Episode 24
- Directed by: Mark Cendrowski
- Written by: Chuck Lorre; Steve Holland; Steven Molaro; Bill Prady; Dave Goetsch; Eric Kaplan; Maria Ferrari; Andy Gordon; Anthony Del Broccolo; Tara Hernandez; Jeremy Howe; Adam Faberman
- Cinematography by: Steven V. Silver
- Editing by: Peter Chakos
- Production code: T12.16024
- Original air date: May 16, 2019
- Running time: 23 minutes

Guest appearance
- Sarah Michelle Gellar as herself

Episode chronology
← Previous "The Change Constant"	Next → —
- The Big Bang Theory season 12

"The Stockholm Syndrome" is the series finale of the American television sitcom The Big Bang Theory. It is the twenty-fourth episode of the twelfth season and the 279th overall episode of the series. Written by series co-creators Chuck Lorre and Bill Prady, with all the season's writers Steve Holland, Steven Molaro, Dave Goetsch, Eric Kaplan, Maria Ferrari, Andy Gordon, Anthony Del Broccolo, Tara Hernandez, Jeremy Howe, and Adam Faberman. The episode was directed by Mark Cendrowski. The episode originally aired on CBS on May 16, 2019 in the United States. The episode finds Sheldon and Amy receiving a Nobel Prize in Physics, and Penny reveals she is pregnant. Sarah Michelle Gellar guest stars as herself. The Stockholm Syndrome was watched by 24.75 million total viewers in the United States and garnered positive reviews from critics.

== Plot ==
After Sheldon and Leonard spend two months repairing Sheldon's DNA molecule model, everyone prepares to fly to Sweden for the Nobel Prize award ceremony. Howard and Bernadette nervously leave their kids for the first time with Stuart and Denise, while Raj leaves his dog Cinnamon with Bert. Penny and Leonard are continuing to keep Penny's pregnancy a secret.

On the flight, Raj is seated next to a sleeping Sarah Michelle Gellar, but his friends do not believe it is her. Penny's frequent bathroom trips make Sheldon fear she is sick. Penny reveals her pregnancy to Sheldon but, instead of being excited for her, Sheldon is only relieved that she is not contagious and reveals the pregnancy to everyone on the plane. Leonard is upset that Sheldon is not happy for them, and Amy and Bernadette are both annoyed at Penny that they did not find out about the pregnancy from her.

At the hotel, Howard and Bernadette call with Stuart, and are anxious about not being with their children after learning about several mishaps that occurred. Howard is annoyed by Sheldon's unsupportive response. Though Penny is enjoying the cuisine, she and Leonard also decide to go home because of Sheldon's rudeness. Amy furiously tells Sheldon he broke his friends' hearts and that people only tolerate him because his insensitivity is not intentional. However, the group decide to stay for the ceremony and Raj brings Gellar as a plus-one.

Sheldon and Amy are awarded medals for the Nobel Prize in Physics. Amy encourages girls to pursue science in her speech. In his speech, Sheldon sets aside the lengthy monologue he had been preparing since childhood, and thanks his family, and then his friends and wife. He acknowledges that his accomplishments are due to their support, and says that he loves them. The show ends when the gang is eating in Apartment 4A (an allusion to the final scene in the opening credits) with Sheldon and Amy wearing their Nobel Prize medals, as an acoustic version of the theme song's chorus slowly plays.

== Production ==
Steve Holland said that the writers were aware of fan expectations about the finale, but aimed to write what "felt right" to them—in particular, the idea that there was a "big emotional climax" after which the characters would "get up and go to work together", with their lives continuing as normal.

Guest star Sarah Michelle Gellar came to fame as the eponymous Buffy in Buffy the Vampire Slayer. The program has been referenced by The Big Bang Theory previously, and writers Steve Molaro and Holland were fans. When the writers realized that Raj would not be seated next to anybody on the plane, Chuck Lorre suggested it would be a good opportunity for a celebrity guest star. Before Gellar was cast, Sandra Bullock was offered the role, but politely declined due to scheduling conflicts.

The characters' clothing evokes the pilot, while Leonard and Sheldon take 139 hours 30 minutes to rebuild the DNA molecule, which is the total length of time of The Big Bang Theory (with each episode running 30 minutes with commercials).

== Reception ==
=== Ratings ===
"The Stockholm Syndrome" was first broadcast on CBS on May 16, 2019, at 8 p.m., and was watched by 18.52 million viewers on CBS, the highest viewing figure that night, and ranking #1 for the day. It received a 3.2 rating and a 17 share in the 18–49 demographic, and aired at 8 p.m. alongside Grey's Anatomy on ABC, Superstore on NBC, Paradise Hotel on Fox and iZombie on The CW.

In Canada, the episode received 4.33 million viewers on CTV, making it the most watched episode that year. In Australia, the episode aired on the Nine Network on July 3, 2019, and had 1 million viewers.

=== Reviews ===
Daniel Fienberg from The Hollywood Reporter gave the episode a positive review, writing that the show had matured through "strong, funny female characters" since its unkind and crude first episode. Fienberg found Sheldon's acceptance speech moving and enjoyed the final scene. However, he criticized that the finale "didn't know what to do with Raj", that it did not sufficiently explore Penny's changed mind over having children, and that Sheldon's speech had ambiguities of being "a dream or hallucination".

Saloni Gajjar from Mashable summarized the episode as "sweet, tying up everything with a formulaic sitcom-style ending". Gajjar saw Amy's speech as one of a few "rare moments" in the show that "let shine the importance of women in science", found the working elevator to be the most surprising development in the episode, and criticized that Raj's narrative lacked closure and Penny's "sharp turn" to wanting children was undeveloped.

Brian Lowry from CNN wrote that "The Stockholm Syndrome", along with the previous episode, "felt satisfying and appropriate, if somewhat low-key". He said that it reflected how the show developed, through the addition of "key female characters" and "more grown-up problems and issues", without abandoning the focus for nerdy topics.

Lincee Ray from Entertainment Weekly appreciated the "low-key" ending to the show, with a "sweet, sincere and lovely" speech from Sheldon.
