= Ciara Renée =

American actress (born 1990)

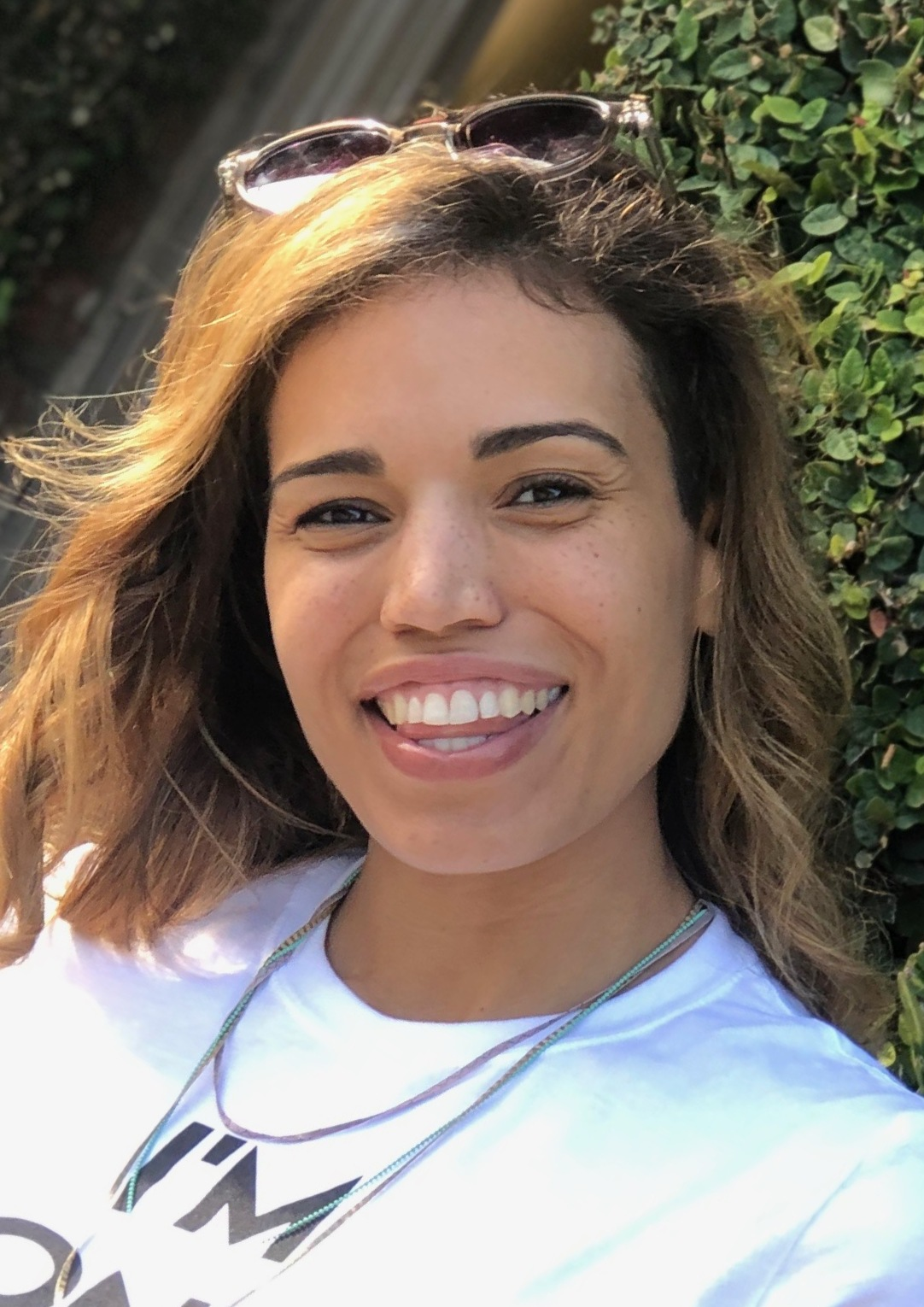
- Renée in 2019
- Born: Ciara Renée Harper; October 19, 1990 (age 36); Harrisburg, Pennsylvania, U.S.
- Education: Baldwin Wallace University (2013)
- Occupations: Actress, musician
- Years active: 2013–present

Ciara Renée Harper (born October 19, 1990) is an American actress and singer. She is best known for her roles on Broadway as The Witch in Big Fish, the Leading Player in Pippin, Jenna in Waitress, and Elsa in Frozen. She played Esmeralda in The Hunchback of Notre Dame at Paper Mill Playhouse and La Jolla Playhouse. In 2015, she guest starred as Kendra Saunders / Hawkgirl in episodes of CW series Arrow and The Flash, before reprising the role in the main cast for the first season of the associated series DC's Legends of Tomorrow, from its premiere in 2016. Her vocal type is mezzo-soprano.

== Early life ==
Renée was born and raised in Harrisburg, Pennsylvania. She attended Central Dauphin East High School and graduated with a degree in Music Theatre from Baldwin Wallace University in 2013.

== Career ==
In September 2013, Renée made her Broadway debut at the Neil Simon Theatre as The Witch in Big Fish after working in a pre-Broadway workshop of Bull Durham. In February of the following year, she was cast in a revival of the musical Pippin, replacing Patina Miller as the Leading Player. Renée guest-starred on Law & Order: SVU in the fall of 2014 on NBC. Based on the Victor Hugo novel and animated Disney film of the same name, Renée took on the role of Esmeralda in a musical adaptation of The Hunchback of Notre Dame at the Paper Mill Playhouse in association with the La Jolla Playhouse from March 15 to April 5 of 2015, a performance the Daily News described as "earthy and lovely". In March 2015, it was announced that Renée had been cast as Kendra Saunders / Hawkgirl in The CW's spin-off series DC's Legends of Tomorrow, an expansion of the network's existing universe of DC Comics adaptations. Renée introduced the character in a special guest appearance on the first-season finale of The Flash on May 20, 2015, followed by four appearances in Arrow that same year, before DC's Legends of Tomorrow premiered in January 2016.

In 2016, Renée played Susan in the Off-Broadway revival of Jonathan Larson's autobiographical musical Tick, Tick... Boom!. The production ran from October 20 to December 18. On November 22, Lilli Cooper replaced her in the role.

In the summer of 2017, she played Mary Magdalene in the Andrew Lloyd Webber musical Jesus Christ Superstar at The Muny in St. Louis, Missouri.

It was announced on January 15, 2020 that Renée would be returning to Broadway to play Elsa in Frozen beginning February 18. However, due to the COVID-19 pandemic, all Broadway theatres were closed in March 2020. Disney later announced that Frozen would not reopen after the lockdown.

Renée replaced country singer Jennifer Nettles as Jenna in the Broadway musical Waitress on November 25, 2021 and performed opposite Joshua Henry as Dr. Pomatter.

On August 25, 2025, it was revealed that Renée had filed a lawsuit against the producers of the musical Wanted after she was informed that she was to be re-cast prior to the show transferring to Broadway. Renée had played the co-lead role of Mary Clarke during a run at the Paper Mill Playhouse in New Jersey when the show was titled Gun and Powder, with the suit alleging that Renée's contract for that initial run guaranteed her "the right to continue [in the role] in a production of the Play mounted by the producers] in New York or London upon completion of good faith negotiations".

== Filmography ==
Television
| Year | Title | Role | Notes |
|---|---|---|---|
| 2014 | Law & Order: Special Victims Unit | Señora Perez | Episode: "Girls Disappeared" |
| 2015 | The Flash | Kendra Saunders / Hawkgirl | 4 episodes |
| 2015 | Arrow | Kendra Saunders / Hawkgirl | Episode: "Legends of Yesterday" |
| 2016 | Legends of Tomorrow | Kendra Saunders / Hawkgirl | Main cast (season 1) |
| 2017 | Master of None | Ellen | Episode: "Le Nozze" |
| 2018 | The Big Bang Theory | Sunny Morrow | Episode: "The Conjugal Configuration" |
| 2023 | Your Honor | Janelle | Recurring role (season 2) |
| 2026 | Elsbeth | TruRose | Episode: "High Class Problems" |

=== Film ===
| Year | Title | Role | Notes |
|---|---|---|---|
| 2020 | A Shot Through the Wall | Candace Walker | |
| 2023 | Paint | Ambrosia Iong | |

== Theatre credits ==
| Year | Title | Role | Venue |
|---|---|---|---|
| 2013 | Big Fish | The Witch | Neil Simon Theatre; Broadway |
| 2014 | Pippin | The Leading Player | Music Box Theatre; Broadway |
| 2014 | Hamilton | Peggy Schuyler / Maria Reynolds | Workshop at The 52nd Street Project; Manhattan |
| 2014–2015 | The Hunchback of Notre Dame | Esmeralda | Paper Mill Playhouse; Millburn |
| 2016 | Tick, Tick... Boom! | Susan | Acorn Theatre; Off-Broadway |
| 2017 | Jesus Christ Superstar | Mary Magdalene | The Muny; St. Louis |
| 2019 | The Wrong Man | Marianna | MCC Theater; Off-Broadway |
| 2020 | Frozen | Elsa | St. James Theatre; Broadway |
| 2021 | Waitress | Jenna Hunterson | Ethel Barrymore Theatre; Broadway |
| 2023 | The Lonely Few | Amy | Audrey Skirball Kenis Theatre; Los Angeles |
| 2024 | Gun & Powder | Mary Clarke | Paper Mill Playhouse; Millburn |
