= The Big Bang Theory season 11 =

The Big Bang Theory
- Season 11
- DVD cover art
- Showrunner: Steve Holland
- Starring: Johnny Galecki; Jim Parsons; Kaley Cuoco; Simon Helberg; Kunal Nayyar; Mayim Bialik; Melissa Rauch; Kevin Sussman
- No. of episodes: 24

Release
- Original network: CBS
- Original release: September 25, 2017 – May 10, 2018

Season chronology
- ← Previous; Season 10 Next → Season 12

The eleventh season of the American television sitcom The Big Bang Theory aired on CBS from September 25, 2017 to May 10, 2018.

The series returned to its regular Thursday night time slot on November 2, 2017 after Thursday Night Football on CBS ended.

As of 2026, this season is the last time a scripted network television show has been ranked No. 1 in the US by Nielsen.

== Production ==
In March 2017, the series was renewed for an eleventh and twelfth season, running through the 2018–19 television season.

Like the previous season, the first five episodes of the eleventh season aired on Mondays due to CBS' contractual rights to air the Thursday Night Football games.

Filming for the eleventh season began on August 15, 2017; it was also announced with the taping report that the premiere for the eleventh season would be titled "The Proposal Proposal". Before the season premiered, five episodes were filmed from August 15 to September 19, 2017.

According to TV Guide, Steve Holland announced on September 22, 2017, that both Bob Newhart and Wil Wheaton would return this season after their absences during the tenth season. A clip showing a wedding gift from Stephen Hawking was released separately, although not included in the twenty-fourth episode.

== Cast ==
=== Main cast ===
- Johnny Galecki as Dr. Leonard Hofstadter
- Jim Parsons as Dr. Sheldon Cooper
- Kaley Cuoco as Penny
- Simon Helberg as Howard Wolowitz
- Kunal Nayyar as Dr. Rajesh "Raj" Koothrappali
- Mayim Bialik as Dr. Amy Farrah Fowler
- Melissa Rauch as Dr. Bernadette Rostenkowski-Wolowitz
- Kevin Sussman as Stuart Bloom

=== Recurring cast ===
- Laurie Metcalf as Mary Cooper
- Christine Baranski as Dr. Beverly Hofstadter
- Stephen Hawking as himself
- Regina King as Janine Davis
- Brian Posehn as Dr. "Bert" Bertram Kibbler
- Wil Wheaton as himself
- Bob Newhart as Dr. Arthur Jeffries/Professor Proton
- John Ross Bowie as Dr. Barry Kripke
- Dean Norris as Colonel Richard Williams
- Brian Thomas Smith as Zack Johnson
- Brian George as Dr. V. M. Koothrappali
- Pamela Adlon as Halley Wolowitz (voice only)
- Joshua Malina as President Siebert
- Lauren Lapkus as Denise

=== Guest cast ===
- Riki Lindhome as Ramona Nowitzki
- Ira Flatow as himself
- Swati Kapila as Ruchi
- Beth Behrs as Nell
- Walton Goggins as Oliver
- Bill Gates as himself
- Megan McGown as Cynthia
- Peter MacNicol as Dr. Robert Wolcott
- Neil Gaiman as himself
- Jerry O'Connell as George Cooper Jr.
- Courtney Henggeler as Missy Cooper
- Teller as Larry Fowler
- Kathy Bates as Mrs. Fowler
- Mark Hamill as himself

== Episodes ==
| No. overall | No. in season | Title | Directed by | Written by | Original release date | Prod. code | U.S. viewers (millions) |
|---|---|---|---|---|---|---|---|
| 232 | 1 | "The Proposal Proposal" | Mark Cendrowski | Story by : Chuck Lorre & Eric Kaplan & Jeremy Howe; Teleplay by : Steve Holland & Maria Ferrari & Tara Hernandez | September 25, 2017 | T12.15601 | 17.65 |
Amy enthusiastically accepts Sheldon's marriage proposal. However, when dining with Amy's colleagues later that night, Sheldon is offended that they are more impressed with Amy's work than his own. With help from Stephen Hawking, Sheldon later comes to grips with the fact that he will not always be the center of attention in the marriage. Bernadette is shocked to realize that she is pregnant again. She and Howard are not thrilled at the idea of having another baby so soon after their first. They attempt to convince Leonard and Penny to have a child as well, but are rebuffed.
| 233 | 2 | "The Retraction Reaction" | Mark Cendrowski | Story by : Steven Molaro & Steve Holland & Maria Ferrari; Teleplay by : Dave Goetsch & Eric Kaplan & Anthony Del Broccolo | October 2, 2017 | T12.15602 | 14.06 |
Leonard gives an interview on public radio where he admits physics research might be at a dead end. The university is furious and, while trying to think of reasons to put in a retraction, he depresses Sheldon into thinking he might be right. Penny asks Howard and Raj come over and help the two but end up just as depressed. Getting drunk with Penny, the men go to the grave of Richard Feynman and realize there is hope for physics as long as they believe in it. Leonard accidentally sends a drunken email to Human Resources, which bemuses Mrs. Davis. Meanwhile, Amy and Bernadette agree with each other to keep quiet about the success in their careers so as not to upset Sheldon and Howard. While bragging to each other, they end up arguing which of their fields is better.
| 234 | 3 | "The Relaxation Integration" | Mark Cendrowski | Story by : Chuck Lorre & Steve Holland & Adam Faberman; Teleplay by : Maria Ferrari & Andy Gordon & Tara Hernandez | October 9, 2017 | T12.15603 | 13.13 |
Sheldon cannot find the perfect wedding date and begins talking in his sleep, adopting the persona of a laid-back person who goes with the flow. Amy and Penny believe that his subconscious mind is trying to tell him to be more relaxed; his attempt to be so while wearing flip-flops ends in disaster. He decides to leave all the wedding planning to Amy. Meanwhile, Raj and Stuart both become interested in Bernadette's new coworker Ruchi. While she likes them both as friends, she does not want a relationship with anyone.
| 235 | 4 | "The Explosion Implosion" | Mark Cendrowski | Story by : Bill Prady & Maria Ferrari & Tara Hernandez; Teleplay by : Steve Holland & Eric Kaplan & Jeremy Howe | October 16, 2017 | T12.15604 | 13.07 |
Howard and Bernadette learn their second child will be a boy, leading Howard to doubt whether he can be a good father to a son. He and Sheldon go out in the desert to test launch a model rocket, but it explodes, causing him further doubt. On the way home, Howard does a good job coaching Sheldon to drive them home, for which Sheldon tells him he will be a good teacher to his son. Leonard's mother Beverly begins talking to Penny as a friend and confidant, troubling Leonard, especially when he learns that Beverly told Penny that she was proud of her, a level of praise she never bestowed upon Leonard himself. When Leonard confronts Beverly, he is touched when she says that of all of her children's spouses, Penny is the one by whom she is most impressed and that, for this, she is indeed proud of him. Meanwhile, Raj helps Bernadette turn baby girl clothes into boy ones.
| 236 | 5 | "The Collaboration Contamination" | Nikki Lorre | Story by : Steven Molaro & Steve Holland & Eric Kaplan; Teleplay by : Dave Goetsch & Maria Ferrari & Jeremy Howe | October 23, 2017 | T12.15605 | 13.20 |
Amy and Howard begin collaborating on a neuroprosthetics project, upsetting Sheldon and Raj, who feel they are not spending as much time with them. When they seek solace with an annoyed Bernadette, she exploits the situation to trick Sheldon into doing Howard's chores. Penny successfully employs the approaches recommended in one of Bernadette's parenting books to deal with Sheldon, but Leonard believes she is coddling Sheldon too much. Sheldon and Raj resolve the issue of missing Amy and Howard by spending time together.
| 237 | 6 | "The Proton Regeneration" | Mark Cendrowski | Story by : Steven Molaro, Dave Goetsch, Alex Yonks; Teleplay by : Dave Steve Holland, Andy Gordon, Jeremy Howe | November 2, 2017 | T12.15606 | 14.14 |
Professor Proton, Sheldon's favorite childhood show, is being rebooted. After unsuccessfully auditioning for the part, he goes to Wil Wheaton for acting tips for his second audition. However, Sheldon is later dismayed when Wil is offered the role instead. Talking it over with Arthur in his dreams, he is still upset to see his idol replaced and considers Wil an enemy again. Meanwhile, Howard gets a vasectomy while Bernadette is on bed rest. Penny offers to take care of Halley for them, but they insult her by expecting her to be irresponsible. Halley ends up saying her first word by calling Penny "Mama."
| 238 | 7 | "The Geology Methodology" | Mark Cendrowski | Story by : Steve Holland & Anthony Del Broccolo & Adam Faberman; Teleplay by : Eric Kaplan & Maria Ferrari & Tara Hernandez | November 9, 2017 | T12.15607 | 13.80 |
Bert asks for Sheldon's help in a geology research project relating to dark matter. Sheldon secretly agrees, but is too embarrassed to admit he is working with rocks. Bert finds out about this and ends their partnership. After talking with Amy, Sheldon goes to apologize, only to find Leonard has taken his place. Meanwhile, Raj runs into Ruchi again and goes out with her, but she does not believe in romantic love. After Howard and Bernadette tell Raj that he can just have sex with Ruchi, he agrees to keep it casual.
| 239 | 8 | "The Tesla Recoil" | Anthony Rich | Story by : Chuck Lorre & Eric Kaplan & Tara Hernandez; Teleplay by : Steve Holland & Maria Ferrari & Jeremy Howe | November 16, 2017 | T12.15608 | 13.44 |
After learning Sheldon went behind their backs to work with the military again, Leonard and Howard say Sheldon is like Thomas Edison, taking credit for others' ideas, while they are more like Nikola Tesla. Leonard and Howard bring in Barry Kripke to help create a better idea than Sheldon's, but Kripke goes to the military himself, cutting all three of them out. Meanwhile, Bernadette fears Ruchi is trying to steal her projects at work while she is on maternity leave and enlists Raj to spy on her. Though he finds proof that Ruchi may be stealing from Bernadette, Raj tries to defend Ruchi like a boyfriend would, pointing out Bernadette's hypocrisy as she would most likely have stolen from other people's projects as well. Ruchi is not happy about this and promptly dumps Raj.
| 240 | 9 | "The Bitcoin Entanglement" | Mark Cendrowski | Story by : Steve Holland & Andy Gordon & Jeremy Howe; Teleplay by : Dave Goetsch & Maria Ferrari & Anthony Del Broccolo | November 30, 2017 | T12.15609 | 13.84 |
In 2010, Leonard, Howard, and Raj mined a lot of Bitcoin, now worth thousands of dollars, but left Sheldon out due to his fear of tax implications. Flashbacks are shown of how the Bitcoin ended up on an old laptop of Leonard's, which he allowed Penny to have during a dinner with Howard, Raj, and Sheldon at the Cheesecake Factory and which she subsequently gave to her old boyfriend Zack after she and Leonard broke up. In 2017, Leonard and Penny retrieve the computer from Zack, who first shows them a video of a drunken Penny apologizing for breaking up with Leonard; when an eavesdropping Sheldon asked why she dated Leonard, she said that it was because he was a great guy; she also said that she believed they would someday end up married but she was not ready for it yet. Leonard is moved by this revelation. The Bitcoin is not found on the laptop. Sheldon explains he had moved it to a flash drive on Leonard's keychain to teach the guys a lesson, but Leonard reveals that he lost the keychain years ago, leaving Sheldon embarrassed at his error. A final flashback to 2013 shows Stuart discovering the flash drive, which he decides to erase and sell for $10.
| 241 | 10 | "The Confidence Erosion" | Mark Cendrowski | Story by : Bill Prady & Maria Ferrari & Adam Faberman; Teleplay by : Steve Holland & Eric Kaplan & Tara Hernandez | December 7, 2017 | T12.15610 | 14.41 |
When Raj misses out on a job at the planetarium, his father says he has no confidence because Howard always makes fun of him. Raj distances himself from Howard and later gets the job. Howard is hurt by this (even after apologizing to him) and tries to make amends with Raj after his first performance at the planetarium but, when he sees him get a date, he leaves without speaking to him, thinking that the latter's life is better without him. Meanwhile, Sheldon and Amy try randomly dividing up wedding tasks, but they keep arguing. The only thing they can agree on is to get married, so they decide to just get married at City Hall instead. However, Sheldon decides that he wants a first dance with his new wife and they go home to plan their wedding.
| 242 | 11 | "The Celebration Reverberation" | Mark Cendrowski | Story by : Steve Holland & Eric Kaplan & Alex Ayers; Teleplay by : Dave Goetsch & Maria Ferrari & Jeremy Howe | December 14, 2017 | T12.15611 | 13.74 |
Howard and Raj are still fighting, so Howard dis-invites Raj to Halley's birthday party. However, when Stuart pulls out as party planner at the last minute, Raj agrees to plan the party, which does not turn out too well due to Halley being asleep, Bernadette being on bed rest, and no people turning up. When Howard and Raj get into a shoving match in the party's bounce house, they end up letting out their frustrations, but also having fun and reconciling. Leonard is depressed upon receiving his successful brother's Christmas card and attempts to make a list of what he and Penny accomplished this year, not coming up with much. This prompts them to think about their plans for the future, so they decide to go on trips and achieve more out of life together before starting a family. Sheldon cooks Amy a Little House on the Prairie-themed birthday dinner, which gives them both food poisoning. They eventually recover enough to attend Halley's birthday party with the others, where they have fun in the bouncy castle and then have sex in Howard and Bernadette's house.
| 243 | 12 | "The Matrimonial Metric" | Mark Cendrowski | Story by : Maria Ferrari & Tara Hernandez & Jeremy Howe; Teleplay by : Steve Holland & Eric Kaplan & Andy Gordon | January 4, 2018 | T12.15612 | 16.16 |
Sheldon and Amy struggle to choose a best man and maid of honor from their friends. They secretly decide to test and score them, allowing everyone to have an equal shot at either role. Once the gang finds out, none of them apart from Bernadette and Stuart want to be in the wedding. Sheldon settles for Stuart as best man but, once Leonard tells Sheldon that, as the groom, the decision is his alone, he picks Leonard. Amy is set to call Bernadette, but once Penny realizes Amy is her best friend, she immediately pitches herself for the position and Amy enthusiastically chooses her.
| 244 | 13 | "The Solo Oscillation" | Mark Cendrowski | Story by : Chuck Lorre & Steve Holland & Anthony Del Broccolo; Teleplay by : Eric Kaplan & Maria Ferrari & Jeremy Howe | January 11, 2018 | T12.15613 | 15.93 |
With Leonard, Howard, Raj, and Amy accomplishing so much on their respective projects, Sheldon is forced to admit he has nothing important upon which to work. He makes Amy leave the apartment for a few days so he can focus, but cannot come up with any ideas and calls his mother as a distraction. Leonard and Amy have fun recreating experiments from when they were growing up, boring Penny, so she eats with Sheldon as he mulls over his scientific studies. Penny helps him realize that his study of dark matter is his rebound science from string theory, which Sheldon admits he never truly disregarded, but explaining string theory to her inspires Sheldon, helping him discover a potential breakthrough in the field. Meanwhile, Howard is too busy with his family to be in the band with Raj, so Raj brings in Bert. But when Howard annoys Bernadette by writing an astronaut-themed musical while she is on bed rest, she makes him rejoin the band. The three are poorly received at a Bar mitzvah after singing Bert's original song about the boulder from Raiders of the Lost Ark.
| 245 | 14 | "The Separation Triangulation" | Mark Cendrowski | Story by : Chuck Lorre & Eric Kaplan & Maria Ferrari; Teleplay by : Steven Molaro & Steve Holland & Tara Hernandez | January 18, 2018 | T12.15614 | 14.92 |
Raj hooks up with a recently separated woman, Nell, after one of his lectures at the planetarium. Her husband, Oliver, confronts Raj at the planetarium and then breaks down over the end of his marriage. After comforting Oliver, Raj talks to Nell and convinces her to give her husband another chance. Meanwhile, after diving once again into string theory and sprawling his work across his and Amy's apartment, Sheldon approaches a reluctant Leonard and Penny and convinces them to let him use his old room to study for a three-day trial period with an agreement to be quiet and stay out of their way. Sheldon surprisingly sticks to this agreement, being a reasonably good guest, which shockingly frustrates Leonard to no end. After Leonard lets out his frustrations, Sheldon then renegotiates the guest tenancy agreement for an extra few days and resumes being his normal demanding self, much to Leonard's relief.
| 246 | 15 | "The Novelization Correlation" | Mark Cendrowski | Story by : Steve Holland & Andy Gordon & Adam Faberman; Teleplay by : Eric Kaplan & Maria Ferrari & Jeremy Howe | February 1, 2018 | T12.15615 | 14.69 |
Sheldon and Amy are surprised to find that Wil Wheaton's new Professor Proton show is actually very entertaining and that Wil had Howard on as a guest. On Howard's suggestion, Sheldon apologizes to Wil, mending their friendship, and tells him he wants to be on the show, but Wil asks for Amy. Sheldon tells her to do it, but she says she often does not do things to avoid upsetting him. Sheldon is horrified when he realizes how selfish he has been, especially when he finds out that the men do the same for him. Sheldon encourages Amy to go on the show to inspire girls to pursue science, even while trying to control his obvious jealousy for her. Meanwhile, Leonard writes a book about a physicist that solves a murder, basing the protagonist Logan Dean on himself and writing romantic tension between Logan and his mean boss Illsa. He lets others read his draft to seek their opinion. Bernadette points out that Illsa is similar to Penny, who thinks it is based on Bernadette, though Leonard does not correct her. However, Bernadette tells Penny the truth, upsetting her and making her mad at Leonard. After calling his mother for advice, Leonard learns that he inadvertently based Illsa on her, but abandons the book when he becomes disturbed at the romantic context.
| 247 | 16 | "The Neonatal Nomenclature" | Gay Linvill | Story by : Eric Kaplan & Maria Ferrari & Anthony Del Broccolo; Teleplay by : Steve Holland & Tara Hernandez & Adam Faberman | March 1, 2018 | T12.15616 | 13.75 |
Bernadette's due date arrives, but she still has not given birth. As Amy and Howard work together at the college, the rest of the friends try various ways to induce her labor, though Sheldon wants to play a complicated board game (The Campaign for North Africa) to help her pass the time. Amy shocks Howard by saying Bernadette has already decided to name the baby after her father, Michael. He does not agree and everyone makes suggestions as to what to name the baby. Bernadette goes into labor and gives birth to a son named Neil, after Neil Armstrong, Neil Gaiman, and Neil Diamond, with Michael as the middle name.
| 248 | 17 | "The Athenaeum Allocation" | Mark Cendrowski | Story by : Steve Holland & Steven Molaro & Tara Hernandez; Teleplay by : Dave Goetsch & Eric Kaplan & Maria Ferrari | March 8, 2018 | T12.15617 | 13.88 |
Sheldon and Amy decide on a wedding date of May 12th. They want to have their reception at the Athenaeum at Caltech. While scouting the location, they are shocked to see Leonard and Penny eating there, as Leonard had told Sheldon their application had been denied. In reality, Leonard just wanted a place to avoid Sheldon. Kripke has booked the venue for his birthday party on the same day as the wedding. Leonard cleans radioactive sludge for Kripke to get the date for Sheldon as an apology for lying. Kripke eventually agrees to change the day but, when Amy hears he wants to sing at the wedding, she suggests they get married at the Griffith Observatory instead. Meanwhile, Bernadette and Howard are unsure if one of them should quit his or her job to stay home with the children. Howard volunteers but, when left alone with the children, he passes out exhausted, leaving Raj in charge. When Bernadette meets Penny for lunch, she realizes that she loves being at the office again, but does not want to leave the children. She and Howard promise to figure it out later after they take a nap.
| 249 | 18 | "The Gates Excitation" | Mark Cendrowski | Story by : Eric Kaplan & Maria Ferrari & Andy Gordon; Teleplay by : Steve Holland & Tara Hernadnez & Jeremy Howe | March 29, 2018 | T12.15618 | 13.26 |
The men are excited that Bill Gates is visiting Penny's pharmaceutical company, although she says that she cannot bring them along. Sheldon believes that it is an April Fools' Day prank. Leonard sees what hotel Gates is staying at on Penny's schedule, so he, Raj, and Howard meet him in the lobby the day before. Once Sheldon sees proof, the men twice send him to the wrong hotel as real pranks. Penny says Leonard can meet Gates for real, so he fakes being sick to avoid him. When Penny puts Gates on a video call, he recognizes Leonard from the previous night. Meanwhile, Amy is tired of Bernadette only talking about her children, so Bernadette uses her expanded parental brain to learn random science facts.
| 250 | 19 | "The Tenant Disassociation" | Mark Cendrowski | Story by : Steve Holland & Jeremy Howe & Trevor Alper; Teleplay by : Dave Goetsch & Eric Kaplan & Maria Ferrari | April 5, 2018 | T12.15619 | 13.00 |
After Sheldon has a food truck moved away from the building, Leonard and Penny are shocked to discover he is the leader and sole member of the Tenants' Association for the building. Amy does not want to be caught in the middle but secretly suggests they rally support from the other tenants to vote Sheldon out. No one else supports Leonard, so Amy tells them Sheldon was never added to the lease when he moved across the hall with her. Sheldon fires back with his own legal technicality, so Amy is forced to support Leonard. She makes Sheldon happy by suggesting he be Leonard's official opposition, making Leonard doubt himself. Meanwhile, Howard and Raj find a drone in Howard and Bernadette's hot tub. With Stuart's help, Raj returns it to the cute owner Cynthia and gets her number. Unfortunately, Cynthia watches footage of Raj on the drone and is immediately turned off.
| 251 | 20 | "The Reclusive Potential" | Mark Cendrowski | Story by : Maria Ferrari & Anthony Del Broccolo & Tara Hernandez; Teleplay by : Steve Holland & Eric Kaplan & Adam Faberman | April 12, 2018 | T12.15620 | 12.77 |
Sheldon has been writing to reclusive scientist Dr. Wolcott (Peter MacNicol) who invites Sheldon to visit him in his completely isolated mountain cabin. The women quickly ask Leonard, Raj, and Howard to tag along with him, making this his bachelor party, despite Sheldon's assertions that it should not be called such. Wolcott has a brilliant mind, but his strange behavior unnerves the guys. He tells Sheldon he cut off all contact with others to focus on science. Though Sheldon enjoys the science, he decides that he does not want to live like Wolcott because of his friends and his love for Amy; the guys then leave to avoid Wolcott. Meanwhile, Penny and Bernadette throw Amy a quilting bee for her bachelorette party, which she quickly finds boring. When Amy tells them she wants a night full of bad decisions as she earlier implied, they go to a bar where Amy drinks a few shots and passes out in twelve minutes. When she wakes up back at the apartment hungover and disappointed, the women lie and reassure her she had a wild time, involving her drunkenly river-dancing.
| 252 | 21 | "The Comet Polarization" | Mark Cendrowski | Story by : Steve Holland & Bill Prady & Eric Kaplan; Teleplay by : Maria Ferrari & Andy Gordon & Tara Hernandez | April 19, 2018 | T12.15621 | 12.91 |
After Neil Gaiman tweets about Stuart's comic book store, it becomes very popular and the crowds upset Sheldon. Stuart hires an assistant manager named Denise and she impresses Sheldon with her comic recommendations. Amy goes to her for information on comics to connect to Sheldon but, when she tries to tell him, he says he has talked enough about comics with Denise. The store's popularity causes Stuart to be unable to babysit for Howard and Bernadette's date night. They try to have another date at home, but Stuart shows up so they hurriedly go out. Meanwhile, as Raj sets up a telescope, Penny sees a new comet. Raj takes sole credit for the discovery, angering Penny. Leonard tries to defend her, but feels sorry for hurting Raj's career. Penny confronts Raj herself and he agrees to share credit after Penny does not give in like Leonard.
| 253 | 22 | "The Monetary Insufficiency" | Nikki Lorre | Story by : Dave Goetsch & Maria Ferrari & Tara Hernandez; Teleplay by : Steve Holland & Eric Kaplan & Jeremy Howe | April 26, 2018 | T12.15622 | 11.79 |
Sheldon needs half a billion dollars to prove his latest concept of string theory, which the university cannot afford to fund. Crowdfunding and selling some of his most valuable comic books to Stuart give him a small start. When Raj mentions gambling in Las Vegas, Sheldon goes there, but is caught calculating odds by security before he can make any bets. Meanwhile, Amy takes Penny and Bernadette shopping for her wedding dress. She loves an old-fashioned one that the other girls admit that they find ugly, though Penny assures Amy that she can make her own decisions about her wedding. Sheldon, however, comes home and sees Amy in the dress and loves how she looks.
| 254 | 23 | "The Sibling Realignment" | Mark Cendrowski | Story by : Steve Holland & Eric Kaplan & Anthony Del Broccolo; Teleplay by : Dave Goetsch & Maria Ferrari & Jeremy Howe | May 3, 2018 | T12.15623 | 12.93 |
Sheldon's mother Mary refuses to attend his wedding unless he invites his older brother George, with whom he is no longer speaking. Sheldon and Leonard fly to Texas to talk to George, who now owns a chain of tire stores. He refuses to attend and later explains to Leonard and Sheldon that the family sacrificed a lot to fund Sheldon's education and he was stuck caring for their mother and sister Missy after their father died while Sheldon was at college. Sheldon never thanked him for this. Leonard takes George back to the hotel room where Sheldon apologizes for what he did and the brothers reconcile. George agrees to attend the wedding. Meanwhile, Howard and Bernadette's children contract pinkeye, infecting everyone except Penny, much to Amy's fury.
| 255 | 24 | "The Bow Tie Asymmetry" | Mark Cendrowski | Story by : Chuck Lorre & Steven Molaro & Maria Ferrari; Teleplay by : Steve Holland & Eric Kaplan & Tara Hernandez | May 10, 2018 | T12.15624 | 15.51 |
Sheldon and Amy's wedding day arrives, with many friends and family attending, including Amy's domineering mother (Kathy Bates) and quiet father (Teller), Sheldon's mother Mary, brother George, and sister Missy, who is pregnant with her second child and separated from her husband, and Mark Hamill, who replaces Wil Wheaton as officiant as a favor to Howard, who returned his lost dog. Sheldon cannot get his bow-tie to be symmetrical and conversations with Amy and his mother give him an epiphany about superasymmetry. Sheldon and Amy, along with Leonard, get caught up figuring out the math of the theory during the wedding ceremony, making Hamill take Star Wars questions to stall for time. Penny retrieves the couple, who then decide that they have the rest of their lives to make science together. Amy and Sheldon express their vows. Amy recites a set of heartfelt vows, leaving Sheldon initially at a loss for words before he reciprocates her loving speech. They are pronounced husband and wife, and as the wedding party starts to depart Kripke sings "At Last" in the background.

== Ratings ==
Viewership and ratings per episode of The Big Bang Theory season 11
| No. | Title | Air date | Rating/share (18–49) | Viewers (millions) | DVR (18–49) | DVR viewers (millions) | Total (18–49) | Total viewers (millions) |
|---|---|---|---|---|---|---|---|---|
| 1 | "The Proposal Proposal" | September 25, 2017 | 4.1/16 | 17.65 | 1.7 | 5.42 | 5.8 | 23.08 |
| 2 | "The Retraction Reaction" | October 2, 2017 | 3.2/12 | 14.06 | 1.8 | 5.14 | 5.0 | 19.20 |
| 3 | "The Relaxation Integration" | October 9, 2017 | 2.9/11 | 13.13 | 1.6 | 4.77 | 4.5 | 17.90 |
| 4 | "The Explosion Implosion" | October 16, 2017 | 2.8/11 | 13.07 | 1.6 | 4.64 | 4.4 | 17.71 |
| 5 | "The Collaboration Contamination" | October 23, 2017 | 2.8/10 | 13.20 | 1.6 | 4.76 | 4.4 | 17.96 |
| 6 | "The Proton Regeneration" | November 2, 2017 | 2.7/11 | 14.14 | 1.8 | 5.14 | 4.5 | 19.28 |
| 7 | "The Geology Methodology" | November 9, 2017 | 2.8/11 | 13.80 | 1.6 | 4.76 | 4.4 | 18.56 |
| 8 | "The Tesla Recoil" | November 16, 2017 | 2.6/11 | 13.44 | 1.7 | 4.84 | 4.3 | 18.28 |
| 9 | "The Bitcoin Entanglement" | November 30, 2017 | 2.5/10 | 13.84 | 1.7 | 4.70 | 4.2 | 18.54 |
| 10 | "The Confidence Erosion" | December 7, 2017 | 2.8/10 | 14.41 | 1.7 | 4.95 | 4.5 | 19.36 |
| 11 | "The Celebration Reverberation" | December 14, 2017 | 2.6/11 | 13.74 | TBD | TBD | TBD | TBD |
| 12 | "The Matrimonial Metric" | January 4, 2018 | 3.1/12 | 16.16 | 1.4 | 3.74 | 4.5 | 19.90^{1} |
| 13 | "The Solo Oscillation" | January 11, 2018 | 3.1/12 | 15.93 | 1.8 | 5.18 | 4.9 | 21.11 |
| 14 | "The Separation Triangulation" | January 18, 2018 | 2.9/12 | 14.92 | 1.6 | 4.65 | 4.5 | 19.58 |
| 15 | "The Novelization Correlation" | February 1, 2018 | 2.9/12 | 14.69 | 1.7 | 4.88 | 4.6 | 19.58 |
| 16 | "The Neonatal Nomenclature" | March 1, 2018 | 2.5/11 | 13.75 | 1.6 | 4.83 | 4.1 | 18.58 |
| 17 | "The Athenaeum Allocation" | March 8, 2018 | 2.6/11 | 13.88 | 1.7 | 4.62 | 4.3 | 18.50 |
| 18 | "The Gates Excitation" | March 29, 2018 | 2.5/11 | 13.26 | 1.7 | 4.90 | 4.2 | 18.17 |
| 19 | "The Tenant Disassociation" | April 5, 2018 | 2.4/11 | 13.00 | 1.6 | 4.67 | 4.0 | 17.67 |
| 20 | "The Reclusive Potential" | April 12, 2018 | 2.4/11 | 12.77 | 1.7 | 4.78 | 4.1 | 17.55 |
| 21 | "The Comet Polarization" | April 19, 2018 | 2.4/11 | 12.91 | 1.7 | 4.91 | 4.1 | 17.82 |
| 22 | "The Monetary Insufficiency" | April 26, 2018 | 2.0/9 | 11.79 | 1.6 | 4.55 | 3.6 | 16.34 |
| 23 | "The Sibling Realignment" | May 3, 2018 | 2.4/11 | 12.93 | 1.7 | 4.73 | 4.1 | 17.66 |
| 24 | "The Bow Tie Asymmetry" | May 10, 2018 | 2.9/14 | 15.51 | 2.1 | 6.30 | 5.0 | 21.82 |
