= Young Sheldon =

American television situational comedy (2017–2024)

- Genre: Coming-of-age sitcom
- Created by: Chuck Lorre; Steven Molaro
- Showrunners: Chuck Lorre; Steven Molaro; Steve Holland
- Starring: Iain Armitage; Zoe Perry; Lance Barber; Montana Jordan; Raegan Revord; Jim Parsons; Annie Potts; Matt Hobby; Wyatt McClure; Emily Osment
- Narrated by: Jim Parsons
- Theme music composer: Steve Burns
- Opening theme: "Mighty Little Man" by Steve Burns
- Ending theme: "Mighty Little Man" (instrumental)
- Composers: Jeff Cardoni; John Debney
- Country of origin: United States
- Original language: English
- No. of seasons: 7
- No. of episodes: 141 (list of episodes)

Production
- Executive producers: Steven Molaro; Jim Parsons; Todd Spiewak; Chuck Lorre; Steve Holland; Eric Kaplan; Jon Favreau
- Producer: Timothy Marx
- Cinematography: Tim Suhrsted; Fred "Buzz" Feitshans IV
- Editors: Jeff Seibenick; David Helfand; Brian Merken
- Camera setup: Single-camera
- Running time: 18–21 minutes
- Production companies: Chuck Lorre Productions; Warner Bros. Television

Original release
- Network: CBS
- Release: September 25, 2017 – May 16, 2024

Related
- The Big Bang Theory; Georgie & Mandy's First Marriage

Young Sheldon is an American sitcom television series created by Chuck Lorre and Steven Molaro which aired on CBS from September 25, 2017, to May 16, 2024. The series is a spin-off prequel to The Big Bang Theory that takes place during the late 1980s and early-to-mid-1990s, and follows child prodigy Sheldon Cooper as he grows up with his family in East Texas. Iain Armitage stars as Sheldon, alongside Zoe Perry, Lance Barber, Montana Jordan, Raegan Revord, and Annie Potts. Jim Parsons, who portrayed the adult Sheldon Cooper on The Big Bang Theory, narrated the series and served as an executive producer.

Development of the prequel series began in November 2016, from an initial idea that Parsons passed along to The Big Bang Theory producers. The following March, Armitage and Perry were cast, and the series was ordered by CBS. Young Sheldon premiered as a special preview on September 25, 2017, and was picked up for a full season that began airing weekly on November 2, 2017. In November 2023, CBS announced that the series would end after its seventh season. The one-hour series finale aired on May 16, 2024. The series received positive reviews from critics.

In January 2024, it was announced that a spin-off series focused on Georgie Cooper and Mandy McAllister was in development. In March 2024, CBS greenlit the series, titled Georgie & Mandy's First Marriage. The first episode was broadcast on October 17, 2024.

== Premise ==
The series follows Sheldon Cooper's early life as a child prodigy in the fictional town of Medford, Texas. As he grows up, he tries to fit into a world of people, including his own family and friends, who struggle to cope with his intellectual capabilities and social ineptitude. While the timeline begins in the fall of 1989, the passage of time is indicated by episodes referencing historic or pop cultural events from the early 1990s, some of which are unique to the US.

== Cast and characters ==
=== Main ===
- Iain Armitage as Sheldon Lee Cooper, a child prodigy well versed in various branches of mathematics and science. He states that he decided to pursue physics around the same time as the show begins. While academically gifted, Sheldon lacks a full understanding of social cues and behaviors. He often shows a sense of superiority over everyone, which leads him to be oblivious to the effect on other people, including his family. Nevertheless, Sheldon has proven to love his family. He is Georgie's younger brother and Missy's fraternal older twin brother. He begins attending high school at age nine and college full-time at age 11, then earns his undergraduate degree and moves to California at age 14 in the final episode, where he begins his graduate studies at Caltech, his future employer. Armitage appears as part of videotaped footage playing the character in The Big Bang Theory through an episode in the final season.
  - Jim Parsons is the voice of adult Sheldon Cooper, who provides the perspective of an adult recalling his childhood. Given a host of retroactive continuity issues explored within the series, he has since been considered an unreliable narrator by some observers.
  - Parsons also physically reprises his role as adult Sheldon in the series finale, where he is revealed to have been writing his memoir. Years after the finale of The Big Bang Theory, he now lives in suburban Los Angeles with his wife, Amy Farrah Fowler, their son Leonard, and their daughter.
- Zoe Perry as Mary Cooper (née Tucker), mother of Sheldon, Missy, and Georgie. She is strict and overprotective of her children, and she worries about them because of her own troubled past. She is a devout Southern Baptist, working at her local church, and sometimes objects to Sheldon's atheism. Nevertheless, she deeply loves her son and wants to protect him for as long as she can. Perry's mother, Laurie Metcalf, played Mary on The Big Bang Theory.
- Lance Barber as George Cooper Sr., father of Sheldon, Missy, and Georgie; a Vietnam veteran and the head football coach at Medford High. George does not share Sheldon's intellect, which sometimes leads others, especially Meemaw, to question his genetic relationship to Sheldon. He is often at odds with his children and particularly struggles to understand Sheldon, but he does try to be a caring and responsible father. In the episodes leading up to the series finale, he is offered a prestigious coaching job at Rice University, but dies of a heart attack shortly afterward. Barber appeared in a Season 5 episode of The Big Bang Theory as one of adult Sheldon's future roommate Leonard Hofstadter's high school bullies, Jimmy Speckerman, before making an appearance via a 1990s videotape as his Young Sheldon character in a final season episode.
- Montana Jordan as George Marshall "Georgie" Cooper Jr., older brother of Sheldon and Missy. Georgie resents the attention his parents, especially his mother, pay to Sheldon. He does not do well at school and gets mocked and teased for it by the rest of the family, particularly Sheldon and Meemaw. He does not get along well with Sheldon and is tired of being compared to him. He attends Medford High with Sheldon and plays on the school's football team. At age 17, he drops out of school to work full-time and discovers a talent for sales that will lead him to become the wealthy owner of a tire store chain in The Big Bang Theory, on which he is played by Jerry O'Connell, appearing in the final portions of the penultimate season for Sheldon's wedding. In season 5, he becomes attracted to a weather forecaster 12 years older than he is and unintentionally gets her pregnant, but starts acting more maturely and responsibly as he goes forward with raising their child and marrying her.
- Raegan Revord as Melissa "Missy" Cooper, younger sister of George, and younger twin sister of Sheldon. She teases Sheldon along with Georgie, but not as much. She does not share Sheldon's intelligence, but is very perceptive. Occasionally, she does not get along with Sheldon, but she finds in her twin brother a solid confidant and has admitted to not feeling as whole without him. She also shows love for her brother even though she constantly denies it. Courtney Henggeler plays adult Missy on The Big Bang Theory, appearing twice: once in the first season during a visit to Sheldon's place where his roommates flirt with her for attention, and the other time in the penultimate season finale for his wedding, when she meets his future wife Amy.
- Annie Potts as Constance "Connie" Tucker, maternal grandmother of Sheldon, Missy, and Georgie, who refer to her as "Meemaw". She is a fun-loving woman who can be sarcastic and often mocks those around her, especially her son-in-law George. On the other hand, she is patient with and sometimes struggles to understand Sheldon, whom she affectionately calls "Moonpie", and advises Mary to trust that Sheldon will find his way. In the fourth season, she is said to be 68 years old. June Squibb plays old Connie in The Big Bang Theory.
- Matt Hobby as Pastor Jeff Difford (seasons 3–7; recurring seasons 1–2), the upbeat pastor at the Cooper family's Baptist church. Like Mary, he too sometimes has friction with Sheldon's irreligious side and often challenges Sheldon to explore their line of thought through logic exercises.
- Wyatt McClure as William "Billy" Sparks (seasons 5–7; recurring seasons 1–4), the seemingly slow-witted son of Cooper family neighbors Herschel and Brenda Sparks. The pilot episode depicts him as Sheldon's nemesis, but he becomes much friendlier early in the series. He has an unrequited crush on Missy.
- Emily Osment as Amanda "Mandy" Elizabeth McAllister (seasons 6–7; recurring season 5), Georgie's 12-years-older girlfriend and later wife, with whom he has a daughter they name after Connie, nicknaming her "CeeCee".

=== Recurring ===
- Wallace Shawn as John Sturgis, a college physics professor whose class Sheldon attends as his first college course. He dates Meemaw with Sheldon's encouragement in seasons 1 through 3. He ends their relationship after having a mental breakdown and spending some time in a psychiatric hospital. After being fired from a post working with a hadron super collider, he works for a grocery store from late season 4 to early season 5 and gets fired again before returning to the university. Sheldon says he is the only adult who understands him.
- Ryan Phuong as Tam Nguyen (seasons 1–4, 7), Sheldon's Vietnamese-American childhood best friend and classmate. Tam introduces Sheldon to many of his non-scientific interests, including comic books and role-playing games. Robert Wu plays adult Tam on The Big Bang Theory.
- Billy Gardell as Herschel Sparks (seasons 1–2), Billy's father and Brenda's husband, who owns a garage and divorces his wife in season 4. In season 7, he is stated to have moved to New Jersey and now has a non-existent relationship with his son.
- Melissa Peterman as Brenda Sparks, Billy's mother, Herschel's wife until season 4, and Mary's initial nemesis and eventual friend, who works at the bowling alley frequented by Meemaw.
- Doc Farrow as Assistant Coach Wayne Wilkins, Sheldon's P.E. teacher and the former assistant, now head football coach at Medford High. He was originally going to be called "Roy", but was named "Wayne" as of the episode "Spock, Kirk, and Testicular Hernia".
- Valerie Mahaffey as Victoria MacElroy (seasons 1–3), Sheldon's homeroom and English teacher at Medford High.
- Danielle Pinnock as Evelyn Ingram (seasons 1–4), Sheldon's math teacher at Medford High.
- Brian Stepanek as Hubert Givens, Sheldon's science teacher at Medford High.
- Rex Linn as Tom Petersen, the principal of Medford High.
- Sarah Baker as Sheryl Hutchins, the Medford High librarian.
- Jason Alexander as Gene Lundy (seasons 1–5), Medford High School's resident drama teacher.
- Nancy Linehan Charles as Peg (seasons 1–5, 7), Pastor Jeff's chain-smoking secretary.
- Chris Wylde as Glenn (seasons 1–3), the owner of the comic book store King Kong Comics.
- Isabel May as Veronica Duncan (seasons 2–3), Georgie's Halloween date who is introduced in "Seven Deadly Sins and a Small Carl Sagan". She becomes a Christian after witnessing the "lust" room in Mr. Lundy's haunted house and loses interest in Georgie, who continues trying to win her over. She starts liking Georgie but backs off after he starts dating Jana.
- Ed Begley Jr. as Dr. Grant Linkletter (seasons 2–7), a colleague and friendly rival of Dr. Sturgis. He regularly pursues Connie but is continually rebuffed.
- Mckenna Grace as Paige Swanson (seasons 2–6), a child prodigy who treats Sheldon as a friend but whom Sheldon views as a rival, although he shows some empathy when she explains her difficult living situation at home.
- Andrea Anders as Linda Swanson (seasons 2–4, 6), Paige's mother.
- Mary Grill as Officer Robin (seasons 2–3, 7), Pastor Jeff's second wife, who works as a police officer.
- Craig T. Nelson as Dale Ballard (seasons 3–7), Missy's baseball coach and Meemaw's new boyfriend after Dr. Sturgis breaks up with her; he owns a sporting goods store and hires Georgie and George to work there.
- Reba McEntire as June (seasons 3–5, 7), Dale's ex-wife, the local hairdresser whom Meemaw befriends.
- Ava Allan as Jana Owens (seasons 3–5), Georgie's girlfriend after he gives up pursuing Veronica. They break up over Georgie's decision to drop out of school.
- London Cheshire as Marcus Larson (seasons 3–4), Missy's boyfriend.
- Wendie Malick as President Linda Hagemeyer (seasons 4–7), the president of the East Texas Tech, Sheldon's university.
- Dan Byrd as Pastor Rob (seasons 5–6), a young, unorthodox pastor hired by Pastor Jeff to teach Sunday school. He and Mary appear to become mutually interested in one another during the fifth season, which upsets George.
- Caleb Emery as Darren (season 5), one of Sheldon's new college dorm room neighbors who shares an interest in video games along with Oscar and Sheldon.
- Ivan Mok as Oscar (season 5), one of Sheldon's college dormitory neighbors who shares an interest in video games along with Darren and Sheldon.
- Rachel Bay Jones as Audrey McAllister (seasons 6–7), Mandy's mother
- Will Sasso as Jim McAllister (seasons 6–7), Mandy's father, who owns an auto service shop specializing in tires, which Georgie will eventually take over and transform into the Dr. Tire store chain in The Big Bang Theory.
- Sofia Rosinsky as Tonya (season 6), Pastor Jeff's niece.

=== Guest ===
- John Hartman as Dr. Jeremy Goetsch, the psychiatrist Sheldon sees when he has phagophobia and when he loses at the Medford High science fair.
- Ray Liotta as Vincent, Meemaw's bookie.
- Jason Kravits as Dr. Ronald Hodges, a NASA engineer and college roommate of Mr. Givens. He makes a presentation about his work to Mr. Givens' science class, which intrigues Sheldon to solve the challenges of reusable launch systems.
- Dave Florek as Dr. Karl Eberland, Sheldon's doctor.
- Karly Rothenberg as Mrs. Janice Veazey, Dr. Hodges' secretary.
- Frances Conroy as Dr. Flora Douglas, headmaster of the boarding school Sheldon briefly attends.
- Harry Groener as Elliot Douglas, Dr. Douglas' husband.
- Paul Yen as Le Nguyen, Tam's father. He runs Medford Mart with his wife.
- VyVy Nguyen as Trang Nguyen, Tam's mother and Mr. Nguyen's wife.
- Phil Morris as the voice of One and Anjali Bhimani as the voice of Zero in a dream Sheldon has.
- Richard Kind as Ira Rosenbloom, one of Meemaw's boyfriends.
- Zuleyka Silver as Selena, Pastor Jeff's ex-wife.
- Anjelika Washington as Libby, an eleventh grade student who aspires to be a geologist and whom Sheldon and Tam befriend.
- Ella and Mia Allan as Bobbi Sparks, Billy Sparks' younger sister with a reputation for tormenting Sheldon.
- Cleo King as Mrs. Costello, a Medford High School counselor
- Michael Cudlitz as a NASA supervisor who appears in Sheldon's daydream sequence.
- Josh Cooke as Barry Swanson, Paige's father.
- Ella Anderson as Erica, Paige's sister, who bonds with Georgie and Missy because they share common experiences being siblings of child prodigies
- Paul Fusco appears as ALF in "A Race of Superhumans and a Letter to Alf" when he reads Missy's letter.
- Mauricio Lara as Ricky, Sheldon's hospital roommate in "A Tummy Ache and a Whale of a Metaphor"
- John Rubinstein as Rabbi Schneiderman
- Benjamin Stockham as Preston.
- Maree Cheatham as Dorothy, Veronica's grandmother.
- Diedrich Bader as the voice of Batman in one of Sheldon's daydreams.
- Steve Burns as Nathan. Burns also is the performer of the show's theme song.
- Taylor Spreitler as Sam, a member of Sheldon's project group.
- Nolan Bateman as Keith, a member of Sheldon's project group.
- Louie Anderson as Ralph, the owner of a trophy shop where Mary wants to buy one for Missy.
- Ryan Stiles as Dr. Bowers, Sheldon's dentist.
- Melanie Lynskey as Professor Dora Ericson, Sheldon's college philosophy professor.
- Dave Foley as Gary O'Brien, Sheldon's university benefactor.
- David Hasselhoff as himself.
- Julia Pace Mitchell as Darlene Wilkins, Coach Wilkins' wife who is revealed by Coach Wilkins to be cheating on him in the episode "An Ugly Car, an Affair and Some Kickass Football".
- Diane Ladd, Alan Rachins and Marla Gibbs as Hortense, Vern and Doris, Meemaw's friends.
- Bill Fagerbakke as Jake, a police officer and Dale Ballard's acquaintance. Fagerbakke and Craig T. Nelson were previously costars on the sitcom Coach.
- Lance Reddick as Professor Boucher, a former Army engineer and a professor of engineering at Sheldon's university.
- Ming-Na Wen as Dr. Carol Lee, a physicist from UC Berkeley brought in to lead a project that Sheldon, Dr. Sturgis, and Dr. Linkletter are working on.
- Octavia Spencer as Officer Rhonda Thomason, Meemaw's Probation Officer. Similarly to Barber, Spencer previously appeared in an episode of The Big Bang Theory as a DMV employee who gives Sheldon his driver's permit.

=== Original cast cameos ===
- Mayim Bialik as Amy Farrah Fowler, Sheldon's wife and the mother of their son, Leonard Cooper, and an unnamed daughter. This role is reprised from The Big Bang Theory. She appears as part of the narration. She also physically reprises her role in the Young Sheldon series finale.
- Kaley Cuoco as the voice of the pool water in one of Sheldon's nightmares. Cuoco previously played Penny in The Big Bang Theory. Sheldon alludes to Penny in the series finale as the babysitter of his children, who sparks his daughter's interest in acting classes.
- Simon Helberg as Howard Wolowitz, an aerospace engineer and one of Sheldon's adulthood friends. This role is reprised from The Big Bang Theory. He appears as a narrator in the fifth season premiere on an episode detailing Sheldon's tryst with engineering.
- Bob Newhart as Arthur Jeffries, a scientist who plays the title character of Professor Proton, Sheldon's favorite educational television series. The character is an homage to Mr. Wizard. Newhart reprises his portrayal of the character from The Big Bang Theory.
- Melissa Tang as Ms. Fenley, a music teacher at Sheldon's high school. Tang had previously played the character Mandy Chao in an episode of The Big Bang Theory.
- Vernee Watson as Nurse Althea Robinson, who nurses George when he suffers a mild heart attack and then to Sheldon when he has his gall bladder removed. Watson reprises her portrayal of the character from The Big Bang Theory, including its pilot.
- Elon Musk makes a cameo appearance in the episode "A Patch, a Modem, and a Zantac®" in a flashforward scene set 27 years into the future. He had also appeared in an episode of The Big Bang Theory.
- Stephen Hawking as himself (voice-only). Hawking previously guest-starred as himself in a recurring role in The Big Bang Theory.
- Penn Jillette and Teller as Pimple and Pus, Sheldon's imaginary personifications of his first pimple and its pus, who appear when he begins going through puberty. Teller also appeared in multiple episodes of The Big Bang Theory as Sheldon's father-in-law Larry Fowler.

== Episodes ==
| Season | Episodes | Originally released | | Rank | Avg. viewers (millions) |
| Season | Episodes | First released | Last released | Rank | Avg. viewers (millions) |
|---|---|---|---|---|---|
| 1 | 22 | September 25, 2017 | May 10, 2018 | 6 | 16.30 |
| 2 | 22 | September 24, 2018 | May 16, 2019 | 5 | 14.37 |
| 3 | 21 | September 26, 2019 | April 30, 2020 | 8 | 11.45 |
| 4 | 18 | November 5, 2020 | May 13, 2021 | 12 | 9.45 |
| 5 | 22 | October 7, 2021 | May 19, 2022 | 8 | 9.21 |
| 6 | 22 | September 29, 2022 | May 18, 2023 | 6 | 9.32 |
| 7 | 14 | February 15, 2024 | May 16, 2024 | 5 | 9.28 |

== Production ==
=== Development ===
In November 2016, it was reported that CBS was in negotiations to create a spin-off of The Big Bang Theory centered on Sheldon Cooper as a young boy. The prequel series, described as "a Malcolm in the Middle-esque single-camera family comedy" would be executive produced by The Big Bang Theory co-creator Chuck Lorre and producer Steven Molaro, with The Big Bang Theory co-creator Bill Prady expected to be involved in some capacity, and intended to air in the 2017–18 season alongside The Big Bang Theory. The initial idea for the series came from Jim Parsons (who portrays the adult Sheldon on The Big Bang Theory), who passed it along to The Big Bang Theory producers. On March 13, 2017, CBS ordered the spin-off Young Sheldon series, which was created by Lorre and Molaro. Jon Favreau directed and executive produced the pilot. Parsons, Lorre, Molaro and Todd Spiewak also serve as executive producers on the series, for Chuck Lorre Productions and Warner Bros. Television. On September 27, 2017, CBS picked up the series for a full season of 22 episodes. On January 6, 2018, the show was renewed for a second season, which premiered on September 24 of that same year.

On February 22, 2019, CBS renewed the series for both a third and a fourth season. The third season premiered on September 26, 2019. Warner Bros. Television suspended production on March 13, 2020, due to the COVID-19 pandemic, leaving the third season with only 21 episodes. Production for the fourth season began on September 22, 2020, and premiered on November 5, 2020. Production for the fourth season concluded on March 15, 2021.

On March 30, 2021, CBS renewed the series for a fifth, sixth, and seventh season. The fifth season premiered on October 7, 2021. The sixth season premiered on September 29, 2022. The seventh season was on hold due to 2023 Writers Guild of America strike. In October of that year, writing resumed when the strike ended. The seventh and final season premiered on February 15, 2024. On November 14, 2023, CBS announced that the series would end after seven seasons, with the series finale airing on May 16, 2024. The final season consisted of a total of 14 episodes, and it finished filming on April 16, 2024.

=== Casting ===
In early March 2017, Iain Armitage was cast as the younger Sheldon, and Zoe Perry as his mother, Mary Cooper. Perry is the real-life daughter of Laurie Metcalf, who portrays Mary Cooper on The Big Bang Theory. Lance Barber stars as George Cooper Sr., Sheldon's father; he had previously appeared in one episode of The Big Bang Theory. Raegan Revord stars as Missy Cooper, Sheldon's twin sister; Revord only got the part after repeatedly asking her mother to be allowed to read for the role. The show also stars Montana Jordan as George Cooper Jr., Sheldon's older brother. Jim Parsons reprises his role as adult Sheldon Cooper, as narrator for the series. In July 2017, Annie Potts was cast as Meemaw, Sheldon's grandmother. In March 2024, it was announced that Jim Parsons and Mayim Bialik will guest star on the series finale as their original characters from The Big Bang Theory.

=== Overlap with the parent series ===
Jim Parsons provides voiceover for the series. In the Season 4 episode "Graduation", Mayim Bialik (as Amy, the wife of adult Sheldon) has a brief voice-over role while Sheldon describes the graduation party for their son Leonard, whom he reveals was named after Leonard Hofstadter and Leonard Nimoy. Amy and Sheldon make their only on-camera appearances together during the series finale in the office of their Pasadena, California home in an unnamed future year, as neither of their children had been born when The Big Bang Theory ended in 2019. Bob Newhart appears as Professor Proton in both series; with the appearance in this series, the character is made to look younger. Iain Armitage (Sheldon), Lance Barber (George), and Montana Jordan (Georgie) make a guest appearance in the parent series in a scene in which a VHS tape recorded decades earlier is played. There are other actors who appear in both series but as different characters. This includes Barber, who had another guest appearance in the parent series as a different character, and Kaley Cuoco who stars in the parent series and makes an uncredited voice appearance in this series, voicing an inanimate object. Elon Musk made cameo appearances as himself in both series, appearing in the sixth episode of the first season of Young Sheldon.

The second-season finale episode aired immediately following the one-hour series finale of the parent series. In a tribute to the parent series finale, several references are made to it in the Young Sheldon episode. The references are both general to the entire parent series, as well as to the series finale in particular. In one scene in the Young Sheldon episode, Sheldon promises his father that when he wins the Nobel Prize, Sheldon will mention him in his acceptance speech. In the parent series finale, Sheldon wins the Nobel Prize, and he does mention his father (among others) in the acceptance speech. In another scene in the Young Sheldon episode, Nobel Prize winners are announced over a montage showing the main characters from the parent series Leonard, Penny, Raj, Howard, Bernadette, and Amy as children. Christine Baranski and Carol Ann Susi, who respectively portray Leonard's mother and Howard's mother in the parent series, make a voice appearance in the montage (a posthumous appearance in the case of Susi). Following the montage, adult Sheldon says that he was wrong about feeling at the moment of the Nobel Prize announcement that he would be all alone for the rest of his life.

== Title sequence ==
The show's title sequence is played to Steve Burns' "Mighty Little Man", the first track from his 2003 album Songs for Dustmites. The background in the first two seasons shows mountains and a desert, whilst the foreground has Sheldon (usually in bow tie, checked shirt, shorts and cowboy boots) walking out, standing triumphantly, noticing a cow, and backing away from it before resuming his triumphant look as the logo appears and tilts to the sky. Occasionally, a tumbleweed appears, instead of the cow. The title sequence was changed from Season 3 onwards to include the entire Cooper family, as well as showing Sheldon in different costumes, such as Albert Einstein, Mr. Spock, The Flash, an astronaut, and a train engineer. Season 5 features a black bull in place of the cow. In Season 7, the title sequence was slightly changed to include Mandy and Constance (CeeCee). The Cooper family doesn't walk away from the bull. Instead, Georgie shoos the bull away.

== Release ==
=== Broadcast ===
Young Sheldon began airing weekly episodes on CBS on November 2, 2017, after The Big Bang Theory. It premiered as a special preview on September 25, 2017. The one hour series finale aired on May 16, 2024.

=== Syndication ===
Reruns of Young Sheldon aired on Nick at Nite from 2020 until 2022, and CMT from 2023 until 2024. On September 27, 2021, the series entered syndication in local markets, covering roughly 90% of the United States. The series also entered off-network syndication on TBS and began airing on September 27, 2021. Season 6 premiered on September 29, 2022, and concluded on May 18, 2023.

In the United Kingdom, Young Sheldon is aired on the free-to-air channel E4. Season 1 premiered on February 22, 2018, Season 2 on November 8, 2018, Season 3 on October 10, 2019, Season 4 on October 20, 2021, Season 5 on April 24, 2022, and Season 6 on July 16, 2023.

In Israel, Young Sheldon is aired on Yes Comedy.

In Southeast Asia, the series also premiered on Warner TV Asia. Reruns airing of this channel on 6 April 2025.

=== Streaming ===
In May 2020, it was announced that the first three seasons of the series would stream on the WarnerMedia's HBO Max service; no release date was announced at that time. The first three seasons were added on September 2, 2020. The sixth season was added in September 2023.

In October and November 2021, Netflix in Australia, Canada, and the United Kingdom picked up the streaming rights to the show. The first four seasons of Young Sheldon were added to Netflix in the United States on November 24, 2023. The series was unexpectedly added to Disney+ in Australia and New Zealand with all seasons streaming on the platform and in other regions.

=== Home media ===
The first season of Young Sheldon was released on DVD and Blu-ray by Warner Bros. on September 4, 2018. The second season was released on DVD and manufacture-on-demand Blu-ray on September 3, 2019. The third season was released on DVD and manufacture-on-demand Blu-ray on September 1, 2020, by Warner Bros. Home Entertainment and Warner Archive Collection respectively. The fourth season was released on DVD and Blu-ray on September 7, 2021. The fifth season was released on DVD and Blu-ray on September 6, 2022. The sixth season was released on DVD on September 5, 2023; no Blu-ray version was released at that time. The seventh and final season was released on DVD on September 24, 2024, along with a complete series set. On the same day, Warner Bros. released individual sets of the sixth and seventh seasons on Blu-ray in addition to a complete series set.

== Reception ==
=== Critical response ===
For the first season, the review aggregator website Rotten Tomatoes reported a 76% approval rating, with an average rating of 6.6/10 and based on 46 reviews. The website's consensus reads, "Young Sheldon's appealing cast and relatable themes bring a fresh—and overall enjoyable—perspective to its central character's familiar story." Metacritic, which uses a weighted average, assigned a score of 63 out of 100 based on 25 critics, indicating "generally favorable reviews".

Ben Travers of Indiewire characterized the initial season as “surprising for all the right reasons”. Entertainment Weekly stated that the show has “brilliant casting” and is overall “inoffensive” and “comforting” and asserted that compared to The Big Bang Theory, “the companion series don’t share much DNA”. A USA Today review by Kelly Lawler noted that the “changes in style and format may be jarring to regular Big Bang viewers” but that this choice “deserves credit for not forcing the Big Bang model onto a series where it wouldn’t fit”. Lawler assessed Armitage’s depiction of Sheldon Cooper as “cute but not cloying, and just blunt and annoying enough to see hints of Parsons’ version of the character nearly three decades older”. Likewise, a review in the Los Angeles Times stated that the first season “has its own gentler, more naturalistic rhythms and pleasures” compared to its predecessor and that Armitage’s portrayal is “charming and believable and just suggestive enough of Parsons”. The Colorado Springs Gazette opined that the show is a "smarter, more humorous and heartfelt show" than The Big Bang Theory.

The Pittsburgh Post-Gazette, reviewing only the pilot episode, commended Perry’s performance as “a standout” and described the overall episode as “warm and embraceable but not yet essential viewing”. Vox gave the show two and a half stars, stating, “It’s less of a blatant cash grab than it seems”, but disapproved of the humour and set design, asserting “it looks a little cheap, relative to the other, glossier single-camera comedies in its rough weight class”. Margaret Lyons of The New York Times argued that the show “isn’t funny” and that “its punch lines… only come from Sheldon’s inappropriate responses”.

Noel Murray reviewed the final season in The Daily Beast, and described the show as “charmingly unassuming” and that it “works in softer, mellower tones”. Murray stated that while “the comedy often relies on characters hitting the same note over and over” and that “the show isn’t top-shelf, can’t-miss great”, overall, it is a show that “connects with a large audience yet still has a meaningful point of view”.

=== Ratings ===
Viewership and ratings per season of Young Sheldon
| Season | Timeslot (ET) | Episodes | First aired | | Last aired | | TV season | Viewership rank | Avg. viewers (millions) | 18–49 rank | Avg. 18–49 rating |
| Season | Timeslot (ET) | Episodes | Date | Viewers (millions) | Date | Viewers (millions) | TV season | Viewership rank | Avg. viewers (millions) | 18–49 rank | Avg. 18–49 rating |
|---|---|---|---|---|---|---|---|---|---|---|---|
| 1 | Thursday 8:30 p.m. (Note: Both seasons premiered on a Monday, with all the other episodes in the respective seasons broadcasting at the designated time slot.) | 22 | September 25, 2017 | 17.21 | May 10, 2018 | 12.44 | 2017–18 | 6 | 16.30 | 10 | 3.3 |
| 2 | Thursday 8:30 p.m. | 22 | September 24, 2018 | 10.58 | May 16, 2019 | 13.60 | 2018–19 | 5 | 14.37 | 11 | 2.6 |
| 3 | Thursday 8:00 p.m. (Note: The eleventh episode of the fourth season aired at 8:30 p.m. due to President Biden's address on the one-year anniversary of the COVID-19 shutdown which aired at 8:00 p.m. on March 11, 2021.) | 21 | September 26, 2019 | 8.24 | April 30, 2020 | 10.14 | 2019–20 | 8 | 11.45 | 20 | 1.6 |
| 4 | Thursday 8:00 p.m. | 18 | November 5, 2020 | 6.77 | May 13, 2021 | 7.21 | 2020–21 | 12 | 9.45 | 22 | 1.2 |
| 5 | Thursday 8:00 p.m. | 22 | October 7, 2021 | 7.12 | May 19, 2022 | 7.06 | 2021–22 | 8 | 9.21 | 16 | 1.0 |
| 6 | Thursday 8:00 p.m. | 22 | September 29, 2022 | 6.88 | May 18, 2023 | 6.97 | 2022–23 | 6 | 9.32 | 12 | 0.9 |
| 7 | Thursday 8:00 p.m. | 14 | February 15, 2024 | 7.99 | May 16, 2024 | 9.32 | 2023–24 | 5 | 9.28 | 14 | 0.8 |

=== Accolades ===
The fourth season was one of 101 out of the 200 most-popular scripted television series that received the ReFrame Stamp for the years 2020 to 2021. The stamp is awarded by the gender equity coalition ReFrame and industry database IMDbPro for film and television projects that are proven to have gender-balanced hiring, with stamps being awarded to projects that hire female-identifying people, especially women of color, in four out of eight key roles for their production.

Accolades received by Young Sheldon
| Award | Date of ceremony | Category | Recipient(s) | Result | Ref. |
|---|---|---|---|---|---|
| Artios Awards | January 31, 2019 | Television Pilot & First Season — Comedy | Nikki Valko, Ken Miller, and Peter Pappas | Nominated | |
| Astra TV Awards | December 8, 2024 | Best Broadcast Network Comedy Series | Young Sheldon | Pending | |
| Astra TV Awards | December 8, 2024 | Best Actor in a Broadcast Network or Cable Comedy Series | Iain Armitage | Pending | |
| Astra TV Awards | December 8, 2024 | Best Actress in a Broadcast Network or Cable Comedy Series | Annie Potts | Pending | |
| Astra TV Awards | December 8, 2024 | Best Writing in a Broadcast Network or Cable Comedy Series | Chuck Lorre, Steven Molaro, and Steve Holland (for "Funeral") | Pending | |
| Critics' Choice Television Awards | January 13, 2019 | Best Supporting Actress in a Comedy Series | Zoe Perry | Nominated | |
| Critics' Choice Television Awards | January 13, 2019 | Best Supporting Actress in a Comedy Series | Annie Potts | Nominated | |
| Critics' Choice Television Awards | March 13, 2022 | Best Actor in a Comedy Series | Iain Armitage | Nominated | |
| Critics' Choice Television Awards | January 15, 2023 | Best Supporting Actress in a Comedy Series | Annie Potts | Nominated | |
| Golden Reel Awards | February 17, 2019 | Broadcast Media: Live Action Under 35:00 | "An 8-Bit Princess and a Flat Tire Genius" | Nominated | |
| Golden Trailer Awards | May 29, 2019 | Best Comedy Poster for a TV/Streaming Series | "Norman Rockwell" | Won | |
| Golden Trailer Awards | July 22, 2021 | Best Animation/Family Poster for a TV/Streaming Series | "Chalkboard" | Nominated | |
| People's Choice Awards | December 6, 2022 | The Comedy Show of 2022 | Young Sheldon | Nominated | |
| Nickelodeon Kids' Choice Awards | May 2, 2020 | Favorite Family TV Show | Young Sheldon | Nominated | |
| Nickelodeon Kids' Choice Awards | March 13, 2021 | Favorite Family TV Show | Young Sheldon | Nominated | |
| Nickelodeon Kids' Choice Awards | March 13, 2021 | Favorite Male TV Star | Iain Armitage | Nominated | |
| Nickelodeon Kids' Choice Awards | April 9, 2022 | Favorite Family TV Show | Young Sheldon | Nominated | |
| Nickelodeon Kids' Choice Awards | April 9, 2022 | Favorite Male TV Star (Family) | Iain Armitage | Nominated | |
| Nickelodeon Kids' Choice Awards | March 4, 2023 | Favorite Family TV Show | Young Sheldon | Nominated | |
| Nickelodeon Kids' Choice Awards | July 13, 2024 | Favorite Family TV Show | Young Sheldon | Won | |
| Nickelodeon Kids' Choice Awards | July 13, 2024 | Favorite Male TV Star (Family) | Iain Armitage | Won | |
| Teen Choice Awards | August 12, 2018 | Choice Breakout TV Star | Iain Armitage | Nominated | |
| National Television Awards | September 5, 2023 | Comedy | Young Sheldon | Won | |

== Music ==
The first and last shots of the series were set to Dire Straits' "Walk of Life."

== Spin-off series ==
In January 2024, it was announced that a spin-off series of Young Sheldon, focusing on Georgie Cooper (portrayed by Montana Jordan) and Mandy McAllister (portrayed by Emily Osment), titled Georgie & Mandy's First Marriage, was in development. On March 5, 2024, CBS announced that the series had been ordered. The series premiered on October 17, 2024.
