= The D&D Vortex =

- The Big Bang Theory episode
- Episode no.: Season 12; Episode 16
- Directed by: Mark Cendrowski
- Story by: Steve Holland; Maria Ferrari; Anthony Del Broccolo
- Teleplay by: Eric Kaplan; Andy Gordon; Tara Hernandez
- Production code: T12.16016
- Original air date: February 21, 2019

Guest appearances
- Joe Manganiello as himself; William Shatner as himself; Wil Wheaton as himself; Kareem Abdul-Jabbar as himself; Kevin Smith as himself

Episode chronology
| ← Previous "The Donation Oscillation" | Next → "The Conference Valuation" |
- The Big Bang Theory (season 12)

"The D&D Vortex" is the sixteenth episode of the twelfth and final season, and 271st episode overall of The Big Bang Theory. It first aired on CBS on February 21, 2019. The episode features several guests playing themselves, including William Shatner.

== Plot ==
Wil Wheaton brings William Shatner on his Professor Proton show to meet Sheldon, who gets so excited that he vomits on Shatner. Going to Wil to apologize, he finds Wil hosts a Dungeons & Dragons (D&D) group with his celebrity friends including Shatner. Finding out Stuart is in the group and never told them, the guys make Stuart panic and quit. Wil secretly invites Leonard who discovers that the group also includes Shatner, Kevin Smith, Joe Manganiello and Kareem Abdul-Jabbar. Leonard tells Penny, who tells Amy and Bernadette, all three women being infatuated with Manganiello. Because of this, Wil kicks out Leonard and admonishes the guys for using him for his connections, and says that one of the worst things about being a celebrity is not knowing whether someone will like him for himself. To apologize, the guys invite Wil to play D&D with them at Leonard's apartment, but Wil, secretly in the middle of a game with Penny, Amy and Bernadette and the group, politely turns them down, before allowing the girls to send them a photo of the events as payback.

== Production ==
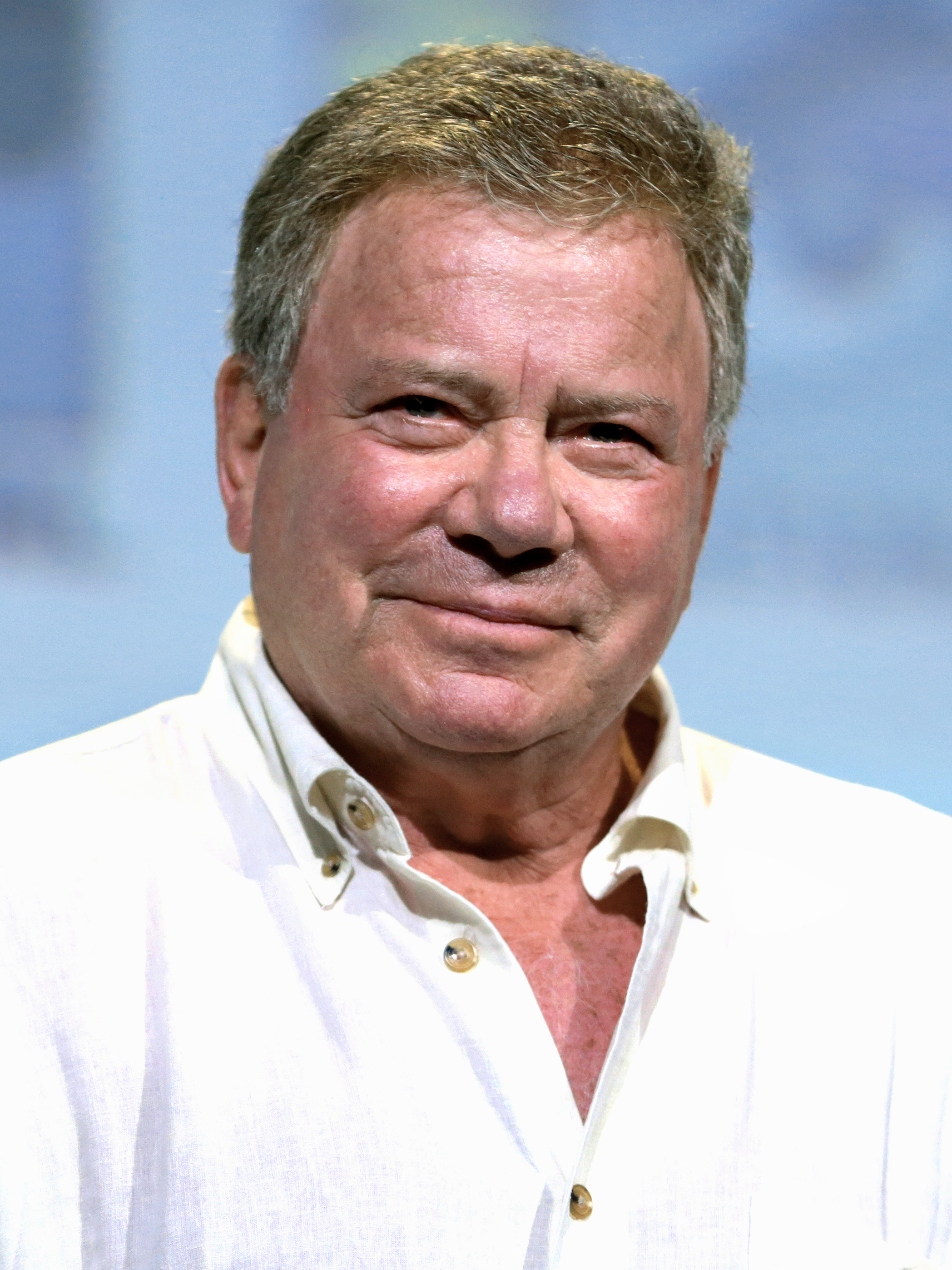
William Shatner

This episode features William Shatner (Star Trek, T. J. Hooker, Boston Legal), who was approached to appear on the show "several years back", a producer commented on his appearance "For one reason or another it didn’t quite work out, whether it was scheduling or whatever. But this time, coming into the final season, we knew we had a wish list of people we still wanted to be part of the show, and [Shatner] was at the top of our wish list. So we reached out to him again, I got on the phone and chatted with him about what we were thinking about for the episode — at that point we didn’t have a script — but I think he felt like he wanted to be a part of this before it came to an end. I think what changed going into the final season is that he knows [series co-star] Kaley [Cuoco] from doing [Priceline] commercials together and they're friendly. When I got on the phone, one of the things he asked was, 'Will I get to play a scene with Kaley?'"

== Reception ==
=== Ratings ===
The episode was watched live by 13.48 million viewers, during its original broadcast.

=== Critical response ===
Vulture gave praise to the episode saying; "And this is the kind of episode I’d hoped we’d see in this run up to the series finale. Wheaton playing this 'delightfully evil' version of himself for the last decade has been pure fun, and the often contentious frienemyship between him and Sheldon is right up there with the other best Sheldon relationship on the show, the one with Penny. Both are based on great chemistry amongst all the actors involved, and the fact that Delightfully Evil Wil and Penny are among the only people who can really go toe-to-toe with Sheldon."
