= Steve Holland (writer) =

American television producer and writer

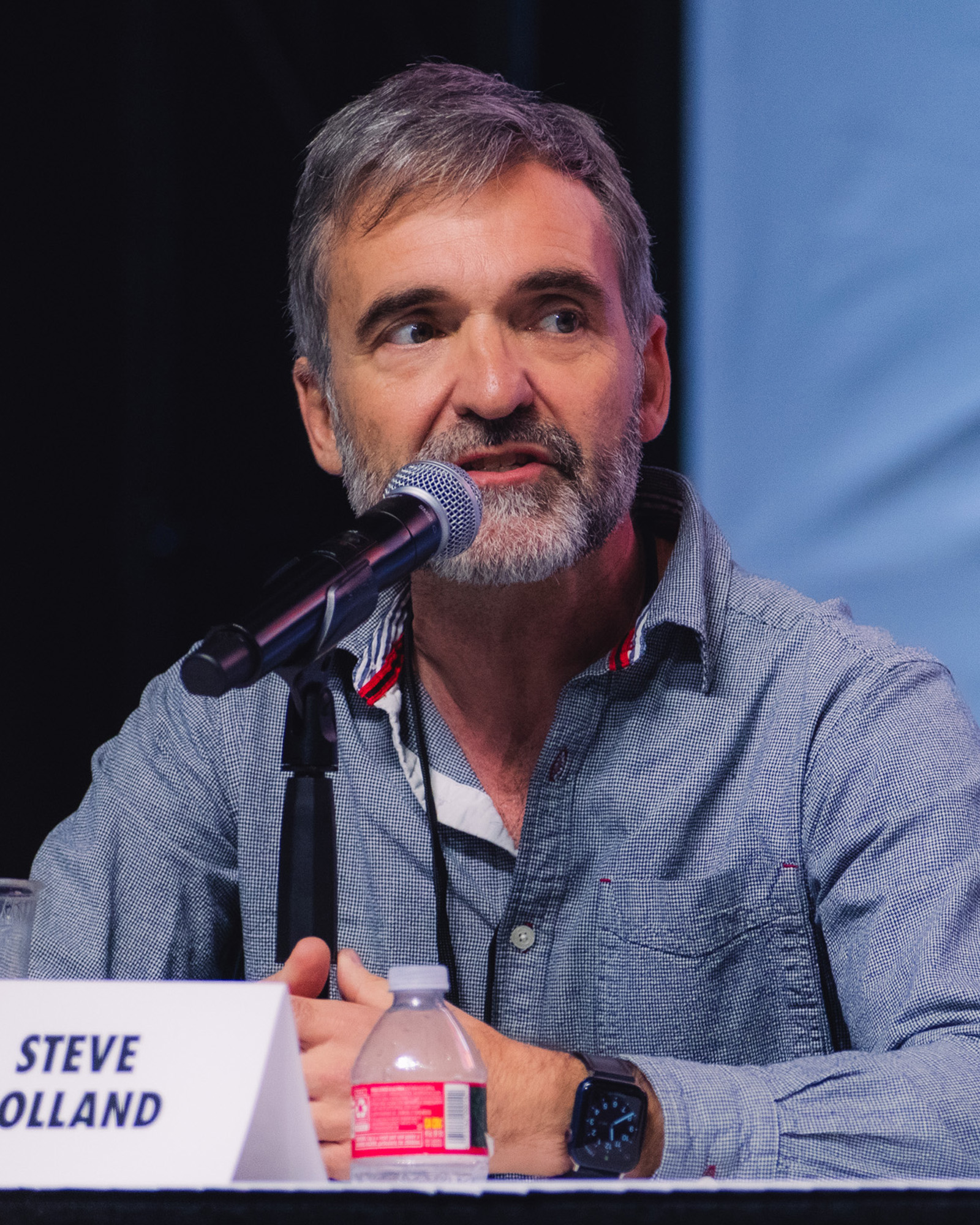
- Holland in 2025
- Born: April 29, 1968 (age 57)
- Occupation(s): Television producer and writer
- Years active: 1998–present

Steve Holland (born April 29, 1968) is an American television producer and writer.

== Career ==
He has written and produced for a number of television series including Kenan & Kel, Drake & Josh, Married to the Kellys, All That, Less than Perfect, Hype, Zoey 101, iCarly, The Big Bang Theory, Rules of Engagement, Young Sheldon, and Georgie & Mandy's First Marriage.
