= Amy Farrah Fowler =

Fictional character from The Big Bang Theory

- The Big Bang Theory / Young Sheldon character
- Mayim Bialik as Amy Farrah Fowler in her debut episode
- First appearance: "The Lunar Excitation"; The Big Bang Theory; May 24, 2010
- Last appearance: "Spoiler: We Couldn't Get Green Lantern"; Stuart Fails to Save the Universe; September 17, 2026
- Created by: Chuck Lorre; Bill Prady; Maria Ferrari
- Portrayed by: Mayim Bialik; Lily Sanfelippo (Young Sheldon)

In-universe information
- Full name: Amy Farrah Fowler
- Gender: Female
- Title: Doctor
- Occupation: Neuroscientist
- Spouse: Sheldon Cooper (m. 2018)
- Children: Leonard Cooper; Unnamed daughter
- Nationality: American

Amy Farrah Fowler, Ph.D. is a fictional character in the CBS television series The Big Bang Theory, portrayed by Mayim Bialik. Amy is a neuroscientist who is the love interest of Sheldon Cooper (Jim Parsons) and subsequent wife in the series. She has a PhD in neurobiology (Bialik herself has a PhD in neuroscience), with a research focus on addiction in primates and invertebrates, occasionally mentioning such experiments as getting a capuchin monkey addicted to cigarettes or getting a starfish addicted to cocaine. Amy goes on to win the Nobel Prize in Physics alongside her husband.

== Character biography ==
Amy makes her debut in the third season finale titled "The Lunar Excitation". In the episode, Raj Koothrappali (Kunal Nayyar) and Howard Wolowitz (Simon Helberg) find Amy through an online dating site, after establishing an account with Sheldon's name and information. The site matches her with Sheldon Cooper, since the two share many similar traits. Upon meeting, Amy and Sheldon become acquainted. The two initially communicate via text messages and video calls and eventually begin meeting in person.

Early on, Amy is shown as coldly rational, displaying little emotion, and appears awkward in social situations. She is initially ambivalent and often condescending towards Penny (Kaley Cuoco) and Bernadette Rostenkowski (Melissa Rauch). As they grow closer, she sheds her strident, aloof personality for a more feminine and social one, although retaining some social awkwardness. Amy begins to consider Penny a close friend, sometimes referring to her as her "bestie", and occasionally admitting that her entire social life revolves around Penny. Amy also often demonstrates an infatuation towards Penny, occasionally bordering on physical attraction. Amy tends to display a condescending attitude towards Bernadette, although she still considers her a close friend. Her feelings towards Sheldon grow considerably over time. Amy considers him to be ideal in almost every way, though sometimes she displays frustration with Sheldon's quirks, and his refusal of physical intimacy.

In season 5, after Amy goes out on a date with comic-bookstore owner Stuart Bloom (Kevin Sussman), Sheldon decides to solidify their relationship as boyfriend/girlfriend with a 31-page "Relationship Agreement". Later in the season, Amy begins a campaign to increase Sheldon's feelings for her by becoming more involved in his interests, including video games and Star Trek.

By the beginning of season 6, Sheldon and Amy regularly display signs of affection, such as holding hands, although Amy wants the relationship to evolve further to include sexual intimacy. By mid-season, Sheldon gets some intimate views of Amy when he cares for her while she has the flu. She also provides Sheldon with consoling hugs. On one Thanksgiving, Amy receives a slap on the rear by an intoxicated Sheldon who tells everyone that she is a "great gal."

In the season 7 episode "The Locomotive Manipulation", Amy wants to have a romantic Valentine's night with Sheldon and arranges for them (along with Howard and Bernadette) to have dinner on a train. While on the train, they meet Eric, another train enthusiast who engages Sheldon in conversation during dinner. Amy is upset about it, first sparking Bernadette, then Amy herself to confront Sheldon. Sarcastically, Sheldon says he will give Amy the romance she wants. He openly mocks her, staring into her eyes and then kissing her. At first, the kiss is forced, but then he leans in and appears to enjoy it.

In Season 8, Sheldon and Amy admit to being in love with each other in "The Prom Equivalency". In "The Clean Room Infiltration", Amy throws a Victorian Christmas at her home. Sheldon wanted to ruin her Christmas by getting her a thoughtful gift. He gave her a picture of him sitting on Santa Claus's lap, which she loved. Amy gave Sheldon cookies she made from his Meemaw's recipe, which he loved as well. In the season 8 finale episode, "The Commitment Determination", Amy and Sheldon are celebrating their 5th anniversary. While making out on Sheldon's couch, Amy tries to reminisce with him. Sheldon asks her whether he should start watching and become invested in the Flash TV show. Amy becomes upset that Sheldon cannot appreciate the irony of how slowly they are taking their relationship and his interest in the Flash TV show. She does not respond to any of Sheldon's attempts to contact her, then finally answers a Skype message. Amy tells him that she has decided to take a break from her relationship with Sheldon, telling him she needs some time to think. Unbeknownst to her, Sheldon had intended to propose. In this season we also learn that Amy is allergic to avocados.

In the Season 9 premiere, "The Matrimonial Momentum", Amy ultimately breaks up with Sheldon after his relentless berating and annoying behavior. Amy casually dated three men while they were apart. During Thanksgiving, they decided to go to the aquarium together. Afterwards, Amy decided she wanted to get back together with Sheldon. She called to ask him if he wanted to get back together. Sheldon said that getting over her was the hardest thing he had ever had to do, and he did not think he could do it again. Disappointed, Amy decided to go out with Dave, a man she had previously gone out with, to try to move on. Sheldon ended up getting an earworm, "Darlin" by the Beach Boys, and realized it was about Amy and how much he loved her. He went to Amy's apartment, while she was on a date with Dave, to declare his love. They ended up making out and subsequently getting back together.

In Season 9, episode 11, "The Opening Night Excitation", Sheldon decides to skip the premiere of the new Star Wars movie and celebrates Amy's birthday with her. As a present, he felt it was time for the two of them to get intimate. This starts a tradition of the "annual birthday booty spectacular", as quoted by Penny.

When Sheldon's grandmother visits in season 9, she confronts Amy for hurting Sheldon and unintentionally reveals the secret engagement ring in his possession. Although initially shocked, Amy is happy to know that Sheldon loves her enough to have considered taking that step forward in their relationship. Amy later prepares a surprise birthday party for Sheldon, which he has not previously celebrated with the group.

After a plumbing accident makes her apartment uninhabitable in season 10, Sheldon and Amy embark on a 5-week experiment living together to test their compatibility. Amy later admits she lied about how long the repairs were taking so that she could continue living with Sheldon. They eventually move into Penny's old apartment together, while Penny moves in with Leonard, and later makes the arrangement permanent. Amy is later offered a three-month science research project at Princeton University in New Jersey and leaves with Sheldon's encouragement. She becomes angry when she learns of Sheldon spending time with Ramona Nowitzki, who she rightfully suspects of having romantic feelings for Sheldon. In the season 10 finale, after Ramona surprises Sheldon with a passionate kiss, he visits Amy and proposes to her. The episode ends on a cliffhanger awaiting her answer. In the season 11 premiere episode "The Proposal Proposal", which picks up immediately after Sheldon's proposal, Amy's answer is further delayed by a phone call from Leonard and Penny, after which she finally says yes. She and Sheldon marry in the season 11 finale. Amy objects to Sheldon wanting to provide sperm for Zack Johnson's baby but does try to get him excited about having their own child.

Amy is musically inclined and is shown to play the harp, autoharp and keyboard throughout the series. Her mother is played by Kathy Bates (although Annie O'Donnell briefly played her in season 4) and her father, Larry, by magician Teller.

In the final season, Sheldon and Amy publish their work on super-asymmetric string theory and win the Nobel Prize in Physics together.

Amy is sometimes heard narrating some scenes of Young Sheldon, such as those that reveal that and Sheldon have a son named Leonard. Amy and the adult Sheldon also appear in the series finale, which shows that they now live in a house in suburban Los Angeles. She makes him go to their son's hockey game and reminds him that his parents, Mary and George, supported him no matter their differences. She also tells Sheldon that he has to go to acting classes with his daughter, who has developed an interest in that activity as a result of the influence of Penny.

== Reception ==
The fourth season received particular praise for character development. Alan Sepinwall of Uproxx, praised the additions of Amy and Bernadette to the cast, writing that "With Amy Farrah Fowler and Bernadette Rostenkowski promoted to semi-permanent status, because of this the show is now able to spend large chunks of each episode focusing only on the women, and in the process has made Penny a much more well-rounded character rather than just a foil for the nerds."

=== Awards and nominations ===
For her performance as Amy Farrah Fowler, Bialik received four consecutive nominations for Outstanding Supporting Actress in a Comedy Series at the 64th, 65th, 66th and 67th Primetime Emmy Awards from 2011–2015.
