= Jessie Prez =

American actor

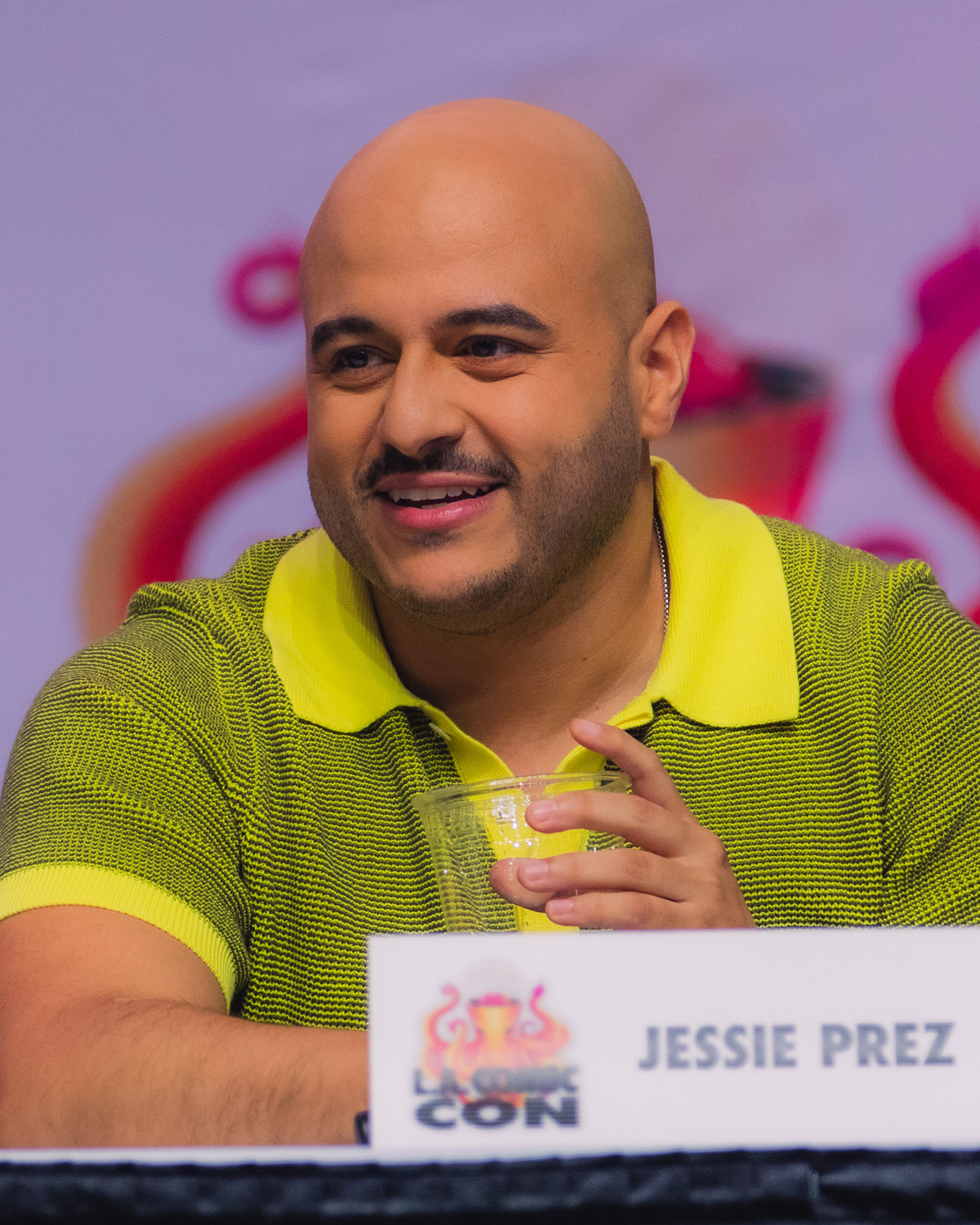
- Prez in 2025
- Born: Chicago, Illinois, U.S.
- Occupation: Actor
- Years active: 2008–present

Jessie David Perez, known professionally as Jessie Prez, is an American actor. He is best known for his main role as Ruben Alvarez in the CBS sitcom Georgie & Mandy's First Marriage, and has also made appearances on Shameless, Griselda, Bosch: Legacy, and 9-1-1: Lone Star.

== Early life ==
A first generation Assyrian American born in Chicago, Prez began his performing career in the city's Storefront theaters and the Steppenwolf Theater Company.

== Career ==
In his first television appearance on Boss and in additional TV and film appearances through 2016, Jessie was credited as either Jessie Perez or Jessie David Perez. From the 2017 film A Place to Be and onward, he became known as Jessie Prez.

Prez had a recurring role as drug dealer Sal Magluta on the Netflix miniseries Griselda (2024). In the fall of 2024, he joined the main cast of the CBS sitcom Georgie & Mandy’s First Marriage as Ruben Alvarez, an auto mechanic and later co-owner of the shop with lead character Georgie Cooper (Montana Jordan).

== Filmography ==
=== Film ===
Year	Title	Role	Notes	Ref.
2008	Barackula: The Musical	Vampire Dancer	Short film	
2013	Washed	Angel Martinez	Short film	
2016	Buckle Up Punk!	Sparks (Humberto)		
2017	A Place to Be	Braulio		
2021	Hot Mess Holiday	Security Guard	TV movie	
2022	Deep Woods	Enrique Diaz		
2026	Midnight Drop	Junior	Short film	

=== Television ===
Year	Title	Role	Notes	Ref.
2011	Boss	Mata's Associate #2	Episode: "Listen"	
2013	Chicago Fire	Doc	Episode: "You Will Hurt Him"	
2014	Lasting Damage Films	Intruder	Episode: "Game Night"	
2017	The Mayor	Passenger #1	Episode: "The Strike"	
2017	Life in Pieces	TJ	Episode: "Thirty-Five Teacher Escape Lottery"	
2019	Shameless	Pablo	2 episodes	
2021	Atypical	Man	Episode: "Player’s Ball"	
2022	9-1-1: Lone Star	Pete	2 episodes	
2022	The Rookie: Feds	Daryl Young	Episode: "Standoff"	
2022–2025	Bosch: Legacy	Albert Morales	2 episodes	
2023	Abbott Elementary	Firefighter	Episode: "Fire"	
2024	Griselda	Sal Magluta	3 episodes	
2024–present	Georgie & Mandy’s First Marriage	Ruben Alvarez	Main cast	
