= The Legacy of a Whitetail Deer Hunter =

- Film poster
- Directed by: Jody Hill
- Written by: Jody Hill; John Carcieri; Danny McBride
- Produced by: Scott Rudin; Eli Bush; Jody Hill
- Starring: Josh Brolin; Montana Jordan; Danny McBride
- Cinematography: Eric Treml
- Edited by: Jeff Seibenick
- Music by: Joseph Stephens
- Production companies: Rough House Pictures; Scott Rudin Productions
- Distributed by: Netflix
- Release dates: March 10, 2018 (SXSW); July 6, 2018 (United States and United Kingdom)
- Running time: 83 minutes
- Country: United States
- Language: English

The Legacy of a Whitetail Deer Hunter is a 2018 comedy-drama film directed by Jody Hill and written by Hill, John Carcieri, and Danny McBride. The film stars Josh Brolin, Montana Jordan, and McBride.

The Legacy of a Whitetail Deer Hunter premiered at the 2018 South by Southwest festival and was later released worldwide on July 6, 2018 by Netflix.

== Plot ==
The great hunter Buck Ferguson and his trusted cameraman Don set out for an epic weekend adventure to reconnect with Buck's son Jaden.

== Cast ==
- Josh Brolin as Buck Ferguson, Jaden’s father, Linda’s ex-husband and Don’s friend
- Montana Jordan as Jaden Ferguson, Linda and Buck’s son
- Danny McBride as Don, the trusted friend of Buck Ferguson
- Carrie Coon as Linda Ferguson, Buck’s ex-wife and Jaden’s mother
- Scoot McNairy as Greg, Linda's boyfriend

== Production ==
In June 2015, it was announced Danny McBride and Josh Brolin would star in the film. In November 2015, it was reported that Montana Jordan was cast in the film. In January 2016, Scoot McNairy joined the cast.

Principal photography began in October 2015.

== Reception ==
On review aggregator website Rotten Tomatoes, the film holds an approval rating of 25% based on 24 reviews, and an average rating of 5.0/10. The website's critical consensus reads, "The Legacy of a Whitetail Deer Hunter wastes a promising premise and talented cast on a frustratingly uneven comedy that lacks enough laughs to forgive its narrative flaws." On Metacritic, the film has a weighted average score of 49 out of 100, based on 12 critics, indicating "mixed or average reviews".
