= Montana Jordan =

American actor (born 2003)

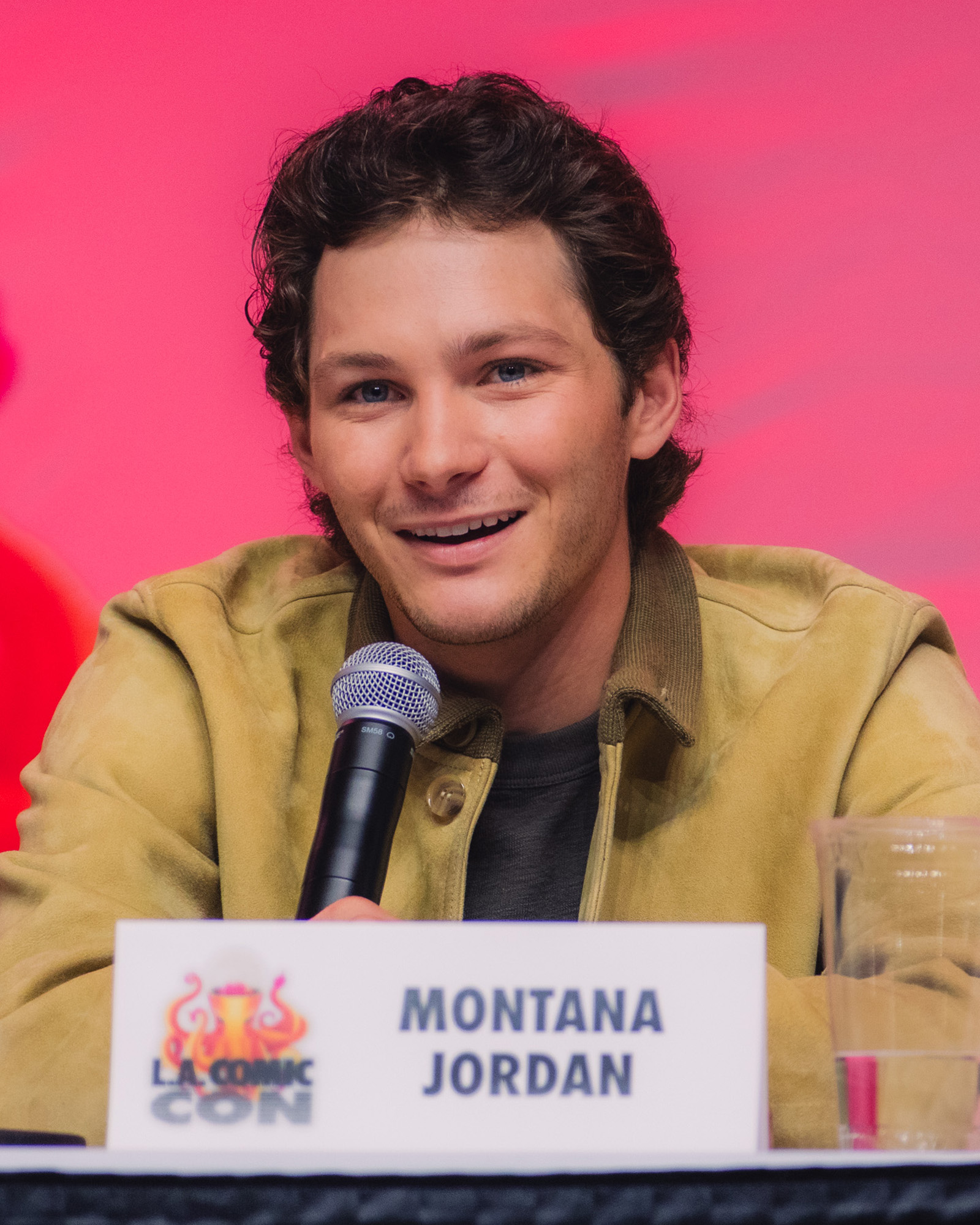
- Jordan in 2025
- Born: March 8, 2003 (age 23); Longview, Texas, U.S.
- Occupation: Actor
- Years active: 2015–present
- Known for: Young Sheldon; Georgie & Mandy's First Marriage
- Spouse: Jenna Weeks (m. 2025)
- Children: 1

Montana Jordan (born March 8, 2003) is an American actor. He is best known for his role as Georgie Cooper in The Big Bang Theory franchise, appearing as a series regular in Young Sheldon (2017–2024). He reprises the role as a lead actor in the spin-off Georgie & Mandy's First Marriage (2024–present).

== Early life and career ==
Jordan was born in Longview, Texas, and raised in Ore City, Texas.

In 2015, Jordan auditioned for The Legacy of a Whitetail Deer Hunter, a film directed by Jody Hill and starring Josh Brolin and Danny McBride. The film, which follows a father-son hunting trip, marked Jordan's acting debut when it was released in March 2018.

Jordan gained recognition in 2017 when he was cast as George "Georgie" Marshall Cooper Jr., the older brother of Sheldon Cooper, in Young Sheldon, a prequel series to The Big Bang Theory. Initially introduced as a supporting character, Georgie became a more central figure during the show's run. His character's relationship with Mandy McAllister (played by Emily Osment) became an important storyline, culminating in the characters' marriage during the show's seventh and final season.

In 2024, CBS announced a spin-off series titled Georgie & Mandy’s First Marriage, with Jordan and Osment reprising their roles. The series, which explores their journey as newlyweds and young parents, premiered later that year and received mostly positive reception. It was renewed for a second season in February 2025.

== Personal life ==
Jordan married his Texan girlfriend of four years, Jenna Weeks, in June 2025 in Longview. They met at a Cody Johnson concert. Their daughter was born in 2024.

== Filmography ==
=== Film ===
Year	Title	Role	Notes
2018	The Legacy of a Whitetail Deer Hunter	Jaden Ferguson	Filmed in 2015

=== Television ===
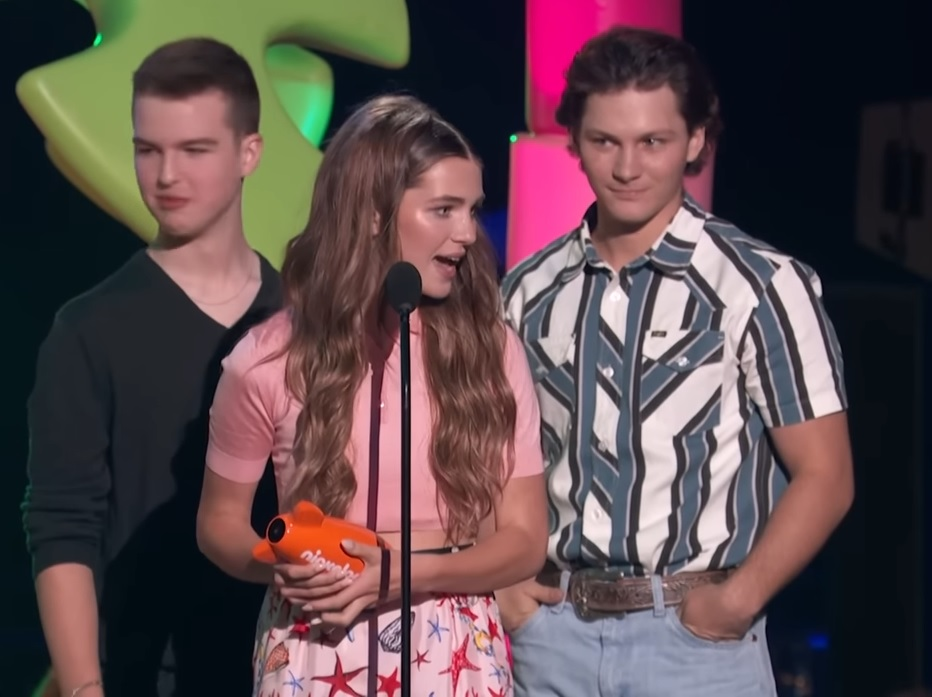
The Cooper siblings cast in 2024. Left to right: Iain Armitage, Raegan Revord and Montana Jordan

Year	Title	Role	Notes
2017–2024	Young Sheldon	George Marshall "Georgie" Cooper Jr.	Main role; 141 episodes
2018	The Big Bang Theory	George Marshall "Georgie" Cooper Jr.	Episode: "The VCR Illumination"
2024–present	Georgie & Mandy's First Marriage	George Marshall "Georgie" Cooper Jr.	Main role

== Awards ==
Award	Year	Category	Work	Result	Ref.
Young Artist Award	2018	Best Performance in a TV Series by a Supporting Teen Actor	Young Sheldon	Nominated	
