= Georgie & Mandy's First Marriage =

2024 television sitcom series

- Genre: Sitcom
- Created by: Chuck Lorre &; Steven Molaro &; Steve Holland
- Based on: Young Sheldon by Chuck Lorre & Steven Molaro; The Big Bang Theory by Chuck Lorre & Bill Prady
- Showrunners: Chuck Lorre; Steven Molaro; Steve Holland
- Directed by: Mark Cendrowski; Nikki Lorre
- Starring: Montana Jordan; Emily Osment; Rachel Bay Jones; Will Sasso; Dougie Baldwin; Jessie Prez
- Theme music composer: Astor Piazzolla
- Opening theme: "Libertango" performed by Layers Classic
- Country of origin: United States
- Original language: English
- No. of seasons: 3
- No. of episodes: 51

Production
- Executive producers: Steven Molaro; Steve Holland; Mark Cendrowski; Chuck Lorre; Bill Prady; Eddie Gorodetsky
- Producers: Timothy Marx; Robinson Green; Maile Gerken Millsap
- Cinematography: Buzz Feitshans IV
- Editors: Pamela Marshall; Brian Merken; Kate Colem
- Camera setup: Multi-camera
- Running time: 18–21 minutes
- Production companies: Chuck Lorre Productions; Warner Bros. Television

Original release
- Network: CBS
- Release: October 17, 2024 – present

Related
- The Big Bang Theory; Young Sheldon; Stuart Fails to Save the Universe

Georgie & Mandy's First Marriage is an American television sitcom created by Chuck Lorre, Steven Molaro, and Steve Holland. It premiered on CBS on October 17, 2024, and is the third installment in The Big Bang Theory franchise, serving as a direct sequel to Young Sheldon.

Set in the mid-1990s, the show centers on the marriage of Georgie Cooper and Mandy McAllister, who is 11 years older than Georgie. Montana Jordan and Emily Osment star as Georgie and Mandy, respectively, alongside Rachel Bay Jones, Will Sasso, Dougie Baldwin, and Jessie Prez.

In February 2025, the series was renewed for a second season, which premiered on October 16, 2025. In January 2026, it was renewed for a third season, which premiered on October 8, 2026.

== Premise ==
The series follows the marriage and the family life of Georgie Cooper and Mandy McAllister in the fictional town of Medford, Texas, during the 1990s. The newlyweds navigate the challenges of raising their daughter, CeeCee, while adjusting to family life, despite Mandy being 11 years older than Georgie, and their continued living with Mandy's parents.

== Cast ==
=== Main ===
- Montana Jordan as Georgie Cooper, the older brother of The Big Bang Theory main character and Young Sheldon titular character Sheldon Cooper. Georgie works at an auto service store owned by his father-in-law Jim McAllister, which he and his co-worker Ruben buy from Jim at the end of the first season. He is the father of CeeCee and is married to Mandy.
- Emily Osment as Amanda "Mandy" McAllister, Georgie's wife who is 11 years older than he is, and the mother of CeeCee. A former waitress at the Bluebell Diner, she works as a weather reporter for the local television station.
- Rachel Bay Jones as Audrey McAllister (née Hicks), Mandy's mother, who favors Connor, Mandy's younger brother. She can be critical and antagonistic, especially towards Mandy, Georgie and Mary Cooper, Georgie's mother.
- Will Sasso as Jim McAllister, Mandy's father, who founded and owned the family auto service business and employed Georgie; at the end of the first season, he sells the business to Georgie and Ruben and retires. He favors Mandy, while struggling to find much in common with Connor, who is very different from him.
- Dougie Baldwin as Connor McAllister, Mandy's unemployed younger brother, who displays little outward emotion, but enjoys making experimental music and is close with his mother Audrey.
- Jessie Prez as Ruben Alvarez, Georgie's co-worker and later co-owner of the auto business with Georgie, who is known for his quick wit and sarcastic remarks. He is close to and lives with his abuela (grandmother).

=== Recurring ===
- Zoe Perry as Mary Cooper, Georgie's mother and CeeCee's grandmother
- Annie Potts as Connie Tucker ("Meemaw"), Mary's mother, Georgie's grandmother and CeeCee's great-grandmother and namesake
- Raegan Revord as Missy Cooper, Georgie's rebellious and troubled younger sister
- Casey Wilson as Beth, Mandy's co-worker at the Bluebell Diner, whose son dates Missy
- Dale E. Turner as Roy, Bluebell Diner's curmudgeonly tea drinker
- Matt Letscher as Fred Fagenbacher, formerly Jim's and now Georgie and Ruben's business rival and Audrey's former high school boyfriend, who owns the other prominent auto business in Medford
- Matt Hobby as Pastor Jeff Difford, the optimistic pastor in charge of the Cooper family's church
- Isabelle and Zariah Booko as Constance "CeeCee" Cooper (season 2-), Georgie and Mandy's daughter

=== Guest ===
- Isabelle and Zariah Booko as Constance "CeeCee" Cooper (season 1), Georgie and Mandy's daughter
- Rebecca Metz as Officer Lisa Gilroy
- Sarah Baker as Sheryl Hutchins
- Craig T. Nelson as Dale Ballard, Connie's boyfriend
- Lance Barber as George Cooper, Georgie's father and Mary's husband, who died during the final season of Young Sheldon
- Doc Farrow as Wayne Wilkins, George's co-coach and a friend of the Cooper family
- Kelli Goss as Valerie, a real estate agent who develops an interest in Georgie
- Kara Arena as Chloe Costa, a girlfriend of Connor who works at the local music store
- Christopher Gorham as Scott, Mandy's ex-boyfriend and boss from her time in San Antonio and Medford's Channel 7 news station
- Jackson Kelly as Todd, Beth's son
- Lidia Porto as Ruben's abuela, with whom he lives
- Mary Grill as Robin Difford, Pastor Jeff's wife
- Rex Linn as Tom Petersen, the principal of Medford High
- Karen Malina White as Lindsey, Mandy's boss at Medford's Channel 9 news station
- Ava Allan as Jana Boggs, Georgie's ex-girlfriend
- Amy Farrington as Professor Phillips, the instructor at a business class Ruben attends

== Episodes ==
Season	Episodes	Originally released	
Season	Episodes	First released	Last released
1	22	October 17, 2024	May 15, 2025
2	22	October 16, 2025	May 21, 2026
3	TBA	October 8, 2026	TBA

=== Season 1 (2024–25) ===
No. overall	No. in season	Title	Directed by	Written by	Original release date	Prod. code	U.S. viewers (millions)
1	1	"The 6:10 to Lubbock"	Mark Cendrowski	Chuck Lorre, Steven Molaro & Steve Holland	October 17, 2024	T12.19101	6.56
Picking up from the end of Young Sheldon, newlyweds Georgie Cooper and Mandy McAllister, along with their infant daughter CeeCee, are living with Mandy's parents Audrey and Jim and her younger brother Connor. Georgie works at Jim's auto and tire shop, much to the disdain of fellow employee Ruben, who believes Georgie does not deserve authority over him. Mandy and Audrey argue when Audrey implies that, since CeeCee is not talking yet (despite being less than a year old), she could be dumb like Georgie. As a result, Georgie and Mandy decide to move out to a small place near the train tracks. They are given some housewarming gifts by Georgie's mother, Mary, and grandmother, Connie. After talking with Jim, Audrey apologizes to Mandy, and they return to the house. As Georgie starts to confront Audrey for insulting him, CeeCee says "Dada"; her first word through the baby monitor.
2	2	"Some New York Nonsense"	Mark Cendrowski	Teleplay by : Steven Molaro & Connor Kilpatrick; Story by : Steve Holland & Jim Reynolds	October 24, 2024	T12.19102	6.40
Georgie visits his father George Sr.'s grave. He claims he can handle the responsibilities of both his old family and his new family with Mandy. Ruben taunting him, Audrey undermining him, Mandy's job search, and his younger sister, Missy, all add to his stress. Missy has him pick her up after she is suspended from school for pulling the fire alarm to skip a test. At home, Mandy suggests they may move for her job prospects, which sets Georgie off, and he accuses Audrey of the idea. He storms out but goes to the hospital, believing he is having a heart attack. The doctor says it is actually a panic attack. He returns and tells Mandy. They make up, and the next day Georgie apologizes to Audrey. Georgie returns to George's grave and admits he does not have it all under control, and admires how George coped. He later brings Missy to the grave, where she lets out some of her grief.
3	3	"Secrets, Lies, and a Chunk of Change"	Mark Cendrowski	Teleplay by : Steve Holland & Connor Kilpatrick; Story by : Chuck Lorre & Steven Molaro	October 31, 2024	T12.19103	6.19
Georgie receives his first credit card, leading Mandy to reveal she is in credit card debt of about $12,000 from an irresponsible past. Among her most expensive purchases is a hospital visit for an ex-boyfriend, Nick. Georgie decides he should get the money owed to her and gets Nick's address from Jim. Nick is apologetic and writes a check for the amount he owes, but when Georgie attempts to cash it at the bank, it is found to be invalid. Nick then shows up at the bank and tells Georgie he is about to get his money by robbing it, and Georgie flees. Mandy returns to her former waitressing job to start paying off her debt, while Audrey watches CeeCee. To help out and make more money at work, Georgie has the idea of using his credit card to buy softball uniforms for the local police department; in turn, they will page Georgie when people need a tow truck from Jim's store.
4	4	"Todd's Mom"	Mark Cendrowski	Teleplay by : Steven Molaro & Nadiya Chettiar; Story by : Chuck Lorre & Steve Holland	November 7, 2024	T12.19106	6.15
Tired of always hanging out with her parents, Mandy goes to a bar with another waitress, Beth (Casey Wilson), who wants to have fun after her divorce. Taking Georgie to Beth's house, everyone is surprised when Beth's son, Todd, recognizes Georgie from high school and is only a year younger than him. Todd invites Georgie to go dirt biking with his friends. Mandy says it is too dangerous, but Georgie accuses her of acting like his mother and goes anyway. He enjoys it but ends up acting like a parent himself when the other guys try to add alcohol to the mix. Mandy goes back to the bar with Beth, and Beth ends up making out with Mandy's dentist. Mandy pages Georgie, and they return home together. Meanwhile, Audrey and Jim get competitive trying to guess the answer to a game of 20 Questions with Connor.
5	5	"Thanksgiving"	Mark Cendrowski	Teleplay by : Steve Holland & Jim Reynolds; Story by : Steven Molaro & Connor Kilpatrick	November 14, 2024	T12.19105	6.39
As the first Thanksgiving since George Sr.'s death approaches, Georgie and Mandy offer to spend it with Mary. Mary declines, saying she wants to be alone (giving Missy permission to go to a friend's house), and not do anything for her first holiday without her husband. Seeing that Georgie is hurting, Mandy convinces Connie and her boyfriend, Dale, to come to the McAllister house for dinner. Missy also agrees after Mandy takes her to get a dolphin tattoo on her ankle. Mary still refuses. On the day, Mary decides to come after all, but gets emotional as she hears Audrey argue about Jim's drinking, which reminds her of her and George. Georgie has the idea to take Mary and Missy to have pie at George's grave. Mary discovers the tattoo. Back at the house, Connor plays the accordion, and Dale plays his guitar.
6	6	"A Regular Samaritan"	Mark Cendrowski	Teleplay by : Steven Molaro & Nadiya Chettiar; Story by : Chuck Lorre & Steve Holland	December 5, 2024	T12.19104	6.18
Georgie tows the car of successful real estate agent Valerie (Kelli Goss), who attributes her success to God wanting her to be prosperous. She invites Georgie to her church, and he decides to go, thinking that the congregation would be a good source of new customers for the auto store. Mandy and the rest of the family are uninterested. Georgie cuts a deal with the church's reverend to repair all the church's vehicles; Jim is impressed and decides to give him a higher cut, which angers Audrey. Georgie likes how welcoming the church is and decides to spend more time there, which upsets Mandy. Audrey tells her that she needs to confront Georgie if this bothers her. After a Bible study session, Valerie kisses Georgie, who immediately pulls away. This is seen by Mandy, who punches Valerie and leaves with Georgie.
7	7	"An Old Mustang"	Mark Cendrowski	Teleplay by : Steve Holland & Connor Kilpatrick; Story by : Steven Molaro & Jim Reynolds	December 12, 2024	T12.19107	6.51
Jim has had an old Mustang convertible in the garage for years, so he and Georgie decide to start working on it to potentially sell it. Georgie also invites Connor to work on it with them, but he declines. Georgie tells Mandy he sometimes wishes he had tried to understand Sheldon better, and so insists that Connor join him and Jim on a road trip for a part for the car. With Connor in his own world of music, Jim admits to Georgie that he is worried about Connor's future. Connor tells Georgie that he feels Jim sees him as a failure for never having had a job, and that everything he does seems to make Jim angry, while Georgie says he is just worried about him. Stopping for lunch, Georgie tells Jim about the time George took him and Sheldon to NASA for a rocket launch that was rained out. While there, Connor gets a job as a busboy to prove his father wrong. Georgie is able to get Connor to return with them, saying he has a feeling Connor will be alright. Meanwhile, Mandy and Audrey try to turn Audrey's office into a nursery without arguing. Audrey admits she wants CeeCee to stay in school, unlike Georgie, but she is also worried that Mandy has given up on her dreams and is stuck; Audrey, too, gave up her dreams to have a family. Returning home, Connor tells Audrey he is glad Georgie was there, as Georgie is a kind person.
8	8	"Diet Crap"	Mark Cendrowski	Teleplay by : Steven Molaro & Connor Kilpatrick; Story by : Steve Holland & Rachel Intrieri	January 30, 2025	T12.19108	6.38
After Georgie gets $1,200 from a sales commission, Mandy feels insecure about her own financial contributions. After hearing a radio advertisement, she convinces Georgie to allow her to spend the commission on diet vitamins, shakes and nutrition bars to sell. Her first day going door-to-door at an apartment building does not go well. In front of a grocery store, Georgie takes over and makes sales, angering Mandy and confusing him. He goes to a bookstore to buy Men Are from Mars, Women Are from Venus and runs into the high school librarian Ms. Hutchins. Taking CeeCee to a doctor's appointment, Mandy commiserates with the other women about their work and husbands and makes her first bunch of sales, also succeeding at the apartment building with this strategy. Meanwhile, Jim does not want Connor to be coddled as much and asks that he do chores. Connor has no issue with this, he was just never asked before. He does them well, surprising his parents.
9	9	"A Tire Convention and the Moral High Ground"	Mark Cendrowski	Teleplay by : Steve Holland & Jim Reynolds; Story by : Steven Molaro & Nadiya Chettiar	February 6, 2025	T12.19109	6.59
Jim prepares to go to an annual tire convention in New Orleans and Georgie wants to tag along. After being convinced by the family, Jim agrees. On the way there Jim tells Georgie he actually goes to a casino for the weekend and has done so for ten years. At home, Audrey tells Mandy she has known from the start but also likes a weekend to herself. Georgie strongly dislikes the idea of lying to Mandy, and Mandy expects Georgie would tell her the truth. At the hotel with Jim listening, Georgie keeps up the lie. Audrey and Mandy go to a bar, leaving Connor to entertain CeeCee with his music. Audrey tells Mandy that Georgie is a good husband and goes a little wild while drunk. Jim tells Georgie that small secrets are normal in a long marriage, though Georgie doubts this. Georgie wins big at blackjack and uses the money to buy Mandy diamond earrings. Upon their return, Mandy privately gloats to Audrey about this.
10	10	"A House Divided"	Mark Cendrowski	Teleplay by : Steve Molaro & Connor Kilpatrick; Story by : Steve Holland & Nadiya Chettiar	February 13, 2025	T12.19110	6.49
While Mary is over at the McAllister house, Audrey finds that Mary has snuck in a photo of herself in the photo album Audrey made for CeeCee. Mary says she did this because she did not want to be excluded, while Audrey claims it was only because she has no photos of Mary. The two women become irritated with each other, and initially Georgie and Mandy each side with their respective mothers. After talking with Jim, Audrey goes to apologize but offends Mary who believes Audrey is just apologizing out of pity since George died. Georgie respects Audrey for trying to apologize, but Mandy believes Mary had reason not to accept, leading to the spouses' feuding. Georgie visits Mary at the church and is soon joined by Audrey and Mandy. Pastor Jeff tries to unsuccessfully counsel the four feuding family members. Georgie and Mandy decide to take inspiration from Sheldon and get their mothers to sign a Grandmother Agreement. The McAllisters then include Mary when getting a family portrait taken.
11	11	"Working for the Enemy"	Mark Cendrowski	Teleplay by : Steve Holland & Jim Reynolds; Story by : Chuck Lorre & Steven Molaro	February 20, 2025	T12.19111	6.57
Jim refuses to sell Korean tires that Georgie insists are better and would give the store an edge. Georgie goes behind Jim's back to get some on consignment for free to sell. Georgie walks out, insisting he quit while Jim claims he fired Georgie. He goes to the other auto store in town, run by Fred Fagenbacher (Matt Letscher), Jim's business rival and Audrey's ex-boyfriend from high school. Fred hires Georgie to annoy Jim. With their husbands stubborn, and Georgie mentioning Fred still likes Audrey, Mandy asks her mother to talk Fred into firing Georgie, so Georgie will apologize to Jim. Going to the other store, Audrey is hit on by Fred but she rejects him. Fred refuses to fire Georgie. After she leaves Fred speaks disrespectfully about Audrey to Georgie, so he quits. Jim admits to Audrey that Georgie was right about the Korean tires selling very well. Georgie apologizes to Jim, and Jim hires him back. Later while Jim and Audrey are eating at Mandy's restaurant, Fred comes in and annoys Jim by arguing over which business is doing better.
12	12	"Typhoid Georgie"	Mark Cendrowski	Teleplay by : Steven Molaro & Nadiya Chettiar; Story by : Steve Holland & Connor Kilpatrick	February 27, 2025	T12.19112	6.46
While working, Georgie comes down with a cold but insists he is well enough to stay, and that he is following his father's example, as George only missed work for his first heart attack. Jim makes Georgie go home, where Connor looks after him. Georgie has a dream where George mocks him for missing work and then turns into a zombie, demanding he go back. Georgie tries to, but Connor forces him back to bed; hinting that George might still be alive had he taken better care of himself. Georgie has another dream and tells George he wants to be around for his daughter. George expresses pride in Georgie. Meanwhile, Mandy is given a fill-in role as the weather girl at a local TV station. Audrey takes her shopping to buy a fashionable outfit. Mandy slightly panics, imagining if this goes well and they need to leave Medford. Audrey calms her down, though later tells Jim if Georgie and Mandy move, they will go with them. Mandy does well, impressing the family.
13	13	"McAllister Auto Loves the Ladies"	Mark Cendrowski	Teleplay by : Steve Holland & Jim Reynolds; Story by : Steven Molaro & Connor Kilpatrick	March 6, 2025	T12.19113	6.91
After Mandy expresses being uncomfortable at the hardware store, Georgie thinks the auto store could be more welcoming to women to get more customers. Jim, Georgie and Ruben initially try themselves, though Audrey says she has some ideas and offers to come work with them. Both Jim and Mandy are nervous about the idea of Audrey and Georgie working together. Surprisingly, they work well together, with Georgie supporting Audrey's cleaning and changes to the front of the store and Audrey complimenting Georgie's sales skills. Jim feels left out and reminds Georgie that he has supported Georgie far longer. At dinner, Georgie starts agreeing with Jim but Audrey catches on and is upset by Jim. That evening Georgie tries to apologize to them both as it is his fault, though Jim and Audrey have already made up, saying small fights are part of marriage. Audrey decides to return home and Jim has all the changes reverted, except the new toilet seat. Meanwhile, Connor makes music from the sounds around the house.
14	14	"A Sportsbook and a Breakup"	Mark Cendrowski	Teleplay by : Chuck Lorre & Steven Molaro & Connor Kilpatrick; Story by : Steve Holland & Nadiya Chettiar	March 13, 2025	T12.19114	6.27
Mandy finds out Connie is a bookie for an illegal sportsbook betting on high school sports. Connie invites George Sr.'s coworker Coach Wilkins to the diner, hoping for inside information but he gives her nothing. Mandy wants in, so Connie gives her a pager to take bets, as she is keeping it a secret from Dale. Georgie does not like it but Mandy points out he used to work in Connie's illegal casino before it was busted. Dale visits the auto store and Georgie tells him the truth. Dale breaks up with Connie and she moves into a hotel. Dale goes to the McAllister house with some of Connie's stuff. Audrey and Jim find out about the sportsbook as Dale gets drunk. Connie takes Mandy with her to collect a debt from a man hiding it from his wife. He gives them his Rolex, which Mandy's parents see her wearing. Dale tearfully apologizes to Connie and they get back together.
15	15	"Goddess of the Music Store"	Nikki Lorre	Teleplay by : Steven Molaro & Jim Reynolds; Story by : Chuck Lorre & Steve Holland	April 3, 2025	T12.19115	5.93
Connor approaches Georgie for advice on how to ask Chloe, who works at the music store selling instruments, out on a date. Georgie takes him to visit her and Connor does surprisingly well on his own, giving Chloe a cassette of instrumental music which she says she will write lyrics for. Mandy and Jim are excited for him, though Audrey is overprotective and everyone tries to get more information from Connor. A few days later he brings her to the house and she sings the lyrics in his room. She kisses him and spends the night with him. Mandy sees her leave the next morning. Mandy later tries to talk to Connor into being careful, but he says been out with women before and he has no plans on having a baby yet, not wanting to ruin his life like Mandy.
16	16	"Baby Fight"	Mark Cendrowski	Teleplay by : Steve Holland & Nadiya Chettiar; Story by : Steven Molaro & Connor Kilpatrick	April 10, 2025	T12.19116	5.98
After taking CeeCee to the doctor, Georgie and Mandy get into an argument about having another baby. Georgie wants another and soon so that there would not be too big of an age difference between the kids. Mandy is uncertain, wanting to focus on her career at the moment. Georgie apologizes but tries to seduce Mandy and ends up sleeping on the couch. Georgie tells Pastor Jeff and Mary, spending the next night at his mother's. Audrey and Connor like the idea of another baby. Jim tells Georgie to wait and that Mandy may change her mind when CeeCee is a bit older. Mandy apologizes for bullying Connor when they were kids. Georgie and Mandy later talk and find out they have very different ideas for their futures. They agree to leave the door open on another baby someday. Mandy gets another fill-in opportunity as the weather girl, but does not enjoy reporting in a major rainstorm.
17	17	"Two Idiots on a Dirt Bike"	Mark Cendrowski	Teleplay by : Chuck Lorre & Steven Molaro; Story by : Steve Holland & Laura Willcox	April 17, 2025	T12.19117	5.80
Mary tells Georgie she caught Missy in her bedroom with a boy; Mandy later learns it is Todd, the son of her co-worker Beth, and tells Georgie. Georgie threatens Todd, resulting in Mandy and Beth brawling in the restaurant. Missy persuades Todd to run away on his dirt bike to Mexico to get married. Mary and Beth both call Georgie in a panic, and Georgie, guessing that Missy and Todd will head for the border crossing at Los Indios, sets out with Mandy in his truck to find them. Audrey calls Mary to check in but they end up annoyed at each other. At a gas station, Missy and Todd break up after arguing about not having taken enough cash even to buy gas. Georgie tells Mandy he feels he is letting his father down, having promised him to look after Missy, and they worry that one day this will happen with CeeCee. Next morning, Missy returns home, to Mary's relief and then fury. Georgie and Mandy, not yet knowing and still heading for Mexico, run out of gas in the desert.
18	18	"TV Money"	Nikki Lorre	Teleplay by : Steve Holland & Connor Kilpatrick; Story by : Steven Molaro & Danny Rivera	April 24, 2025	T12.19118	5.93
Mandy gets paid for her TV work and decides to go on a spa day. This upsets Jim who feels Mandy is not financially responsible and does not show appreciation of her parents. He tells Audrey and Georgie. When Mandy hears, she writes her father a check and is surprised when he takes it. Audrey is surprised too and points out she and Georgie will never leave if they have to keep paying him. Jim tries to give the money back to Georgie, who refuses to accept it. Audrey talks to Mandy about the difficulties and unappreciated labor of being a working mother. After Jim is insensitive, Audrey and Mandy go to the spa and leave Jim to watch CeeCee alone. Meanwhile, Chloe needs a place to stay and stays in Connor's room. This stresses him out, as he is not used to being around someone for so long and believes his weirdness will drive her away. Chloe admits she is actually recently homeless and does not see anything wrong with Connor. They enjoy making music together.
19	19	"Snitch v. Deadbeat"	Mark Cendrowski	Teleplay by : Steven Molaro & Jim Reynolds; Story by : Steve Holland & Nadiya Chettiar	May 1, 2025	T12.19119	5.63
Connie tells Mandy that Jim owes $1,200 from betting with her. Mandy confronts Jim, and he tries to pay off in $50 installments so Audrey will not find out. Unwilling to wait, and unmoved by Georgie's attempt to use CeeCee to soften her up, Connie calls Audrey and explains. Audrey is furious at Jim for gambling, Mandy for working with Connie and Georgie for not telling her about this. Audrey manages to scare Jim straight away from gambling. Audrey confronts Connie saying they will not be paying and that she will turn Connie into the police. Connie threatens she will take Mandy down with her. Audrey goes to the police station but has a change of heart and leaves without reporting the crime. Georgie comes home and says he fixed everything by paying Connie with his own stash of money, angering Jim, Audrey and Mandy.
20	20	"Ladies Love Brunch"	Mark Cendrowski	Teleplay by : Steve Holland & Connor Kilpatrick; Story by : Steven Molaro & Jamie Laski	May 8, 2025	T12.19120	5.64
Georgie and Mandy try to make plans for Mother's Day, though both of their respective mothers also want to spend time with them. Audrey also asks Connor if she can meet Chloe. Connor agrees, but asks that Georgie and Mandy also be there as a buffer. To spend time with everyone, Georgie suggests a brunch for all the mothers at the McAlister house. With Missy grounded again, Mary agrees to get some space. The brunch initially goes well, and everyone likes Chloe as she tells the story of her ex-boyfriend abandoning her in Medford. Audrey is upset when Chloe seems to connect more with Mary, leading Mary and Audrey to snipe at each other once again, making it awkward for everyone. Audrey asks Mary where Missy is and that starts the fight again. Georgie and Mandy spend time together that night.
21	21	"Guilt Boots"	Mark Cendrowski	Teleplay by : Steven Molaro & Jim Reynolds; Story by : Steve Holland & Nadiya Chettiar & Rachel Intrieri	May 15, 2025	T12.19121	5.62
Mandy accepts a full-time position as the early morning weather reporter. Her boss, Scott, (Christopher Gorham), is her former boss and ex-boyfriend from her last reporter job in San Antonio. She has not told Georgie this, despite filling in at the station for months, and so she buys him gifts to assuage her guilt. Both Audrey and the local priest tell Mandy she must be honest. Meanwhile, Fred Fagenbacher offers to buy Jim's store, which would give Jim enough money to retire. Georgie is upset, as Jim had spoken of leaving the store to him one day. He unsuccessfully tries to talk Fred out of it and turns down a job from Fred. Jim tells Mandy he is torn, but has in mind that Georgie's father was younger than him when he died at work. Jim asks Audrey's opinion, and she tells Jim it is his choice. Jim tells the family he's decided to take the offer. That night, Mandy decides to tell Georgie about her and Scott. [Note: The weather map behind Mandy on the TV shows the fictional town of Medford as being about two-thirds of the distance between Dallas and Lufkin.]
22	22	"Big Decisions"	Mark Cendrowski	Teleplay by : Chuck Lorre & Connor Kilpatrick; Story by : Steven Molaro & Steve Holland	May 15, 2025	T12.19122	6.00
Georgie is upset by Mandy's news and goes to Mary's house. He thinks Mandy should not work with an ex-boyfriend, and that both Mandy and Jim have broken his trust. Audrey surprises Mandy by supporting her. Georgie asks Jim to give him 48 hours to come up with the money to match Fred's offer. When Mandy questions the potential debt, he points out her credit card debt and that he must make decisions for his career like Mandy is, but he is rejected at the banks in town. Fred gives Jim only one more day to respond. Mary offers her house as collateral for Georgie to get a loan. After visiting George's grave, Georgie goes to Jim with his offer which is still short of Fred's, so Ruben offers to make up the difference as Georgie's business partner. Jim accepts and is excited to retire. Mandy is promoted to weekend evenings by Scott, and she tells Georgie she has quit the waitressing job. Georgie and Mandy talk and reconcile. The next day, Fred comes into the store and warns Georgie and Ruben he intends to drive them out of business.

=== Season 2 (2025–26) ===
No. overall	No. in season	Title	Directed by	Written by	Original release date	Prod. code	U.S. viewers (millions)
23	1	"A Tie Breaker and a Huge Mistake"	Mark Cendrowski	Teleplay by : Steven Molaro & Steve Holland; Story by : Chuck Lorre & Jim Reynolds	October 16, 2025	T12.20201	4.83
Georgie and Ruben start the business together but cannot agree on anything. Georgie wants to spend money to make money and sees them eventually expanding under the name "Doctor Tire." Ruben wants to be more cautious as they are both under a lot of debt. The feud becomes centered on buying a new computer to automate their inventory. Jim stops by and suggests they lease one to see if it's worth it. This leads to another argument between the co-owners about hiring an accountant. Georgie and Ruben have a foot race around town as a tiebreaker. Mandy bandages Georgie's feet as he gloats he won. Meanwhile, now retired, Jim quickly does everything he wanted around the house. He annoys his other family members while bored. He drives around town in the Mustang but it breaks down, forcing him to walk home while his lumbago flares up.
24	2	"Fan Mail and Old-Timey Organ Music"	Mark Cendrowski	Teleplay by : Steven Molaro & Connor Kilpatrick; Story by : Steve Holland & Nadiya Chettiar	October 23, 2025	T12.20202	5.18
Mandy gets out of a speeding ticket after the police officer recognizes her as the weather girl. Audrey loves that her daughter is a local celebrity, bringing her picture to several local businesses. However they do not recognize her and decline the picture. While out to dinner a man sends a drink to Mandy right in front of Georgie. He is very jealous and thinks Mandy likes the attention. Mandy points out women flirt with Georgie at times too. Ruben sympathizes with Georgie and they go to a bar. Georgie tries to step in when a man hits on the bartender and ends up with a black eye. Audrey tells Mandy she is good at her job and should use every advantage she has. Both Mandy and Audrey are disturbed by a piece of fan mail. Meanwhile, Connor has been asked to perform the music at the high school baseball game. His first time doesn't go well as he doesn't understand sports, playing "Take Me Out to the Ball Game" at the wrong time, and hyping up the opposing team. Jim explains things to Connor and tells him to have fun. At the next game Connor is booed for playing a techno version of The National Anthem.
25	3	"A Will and a Dead Man's Wife"	Mark Cendrowski	Teleplay by : Steve Holland & Jim Reynolds; Story by : Steven Molaro & Connor Kilpatrick	October 30, 2025	T12.20203	5.36
Having dinner at the Cooper house, Mary says that Connie is trying to set her up with a man from bowling. Georgie is surprised by this feeling his mother isn't ready. Mandy points out it has been a year and a half since George died. Missy likes having her mother out of the house, but also sincerely tells her she supports her dating if she wants. Mary goes on the date and meets Joseph. Mandy finds out about this but hides it from Georgie. He calls the house only for Missy to be throwing a party and tell him she went on another date. Georgie confronting Mary about this at the church does not go well. He even rats Missy out for throwing a party. Pastor Jeff points out The Bible seems to support widows remarrying after a death. After hearing Mary struggle and pray on it, Missy passes on a message onto to Ruben, to admonish Georgie. The McAllisters support Mary and point out this is brave of her. Still struggling, Georgie goes to the house but leaves silently when he sees Mary talking with Joseph in the kitchen. Meanwhile, Jim points out he and Audrey don't have wills. Jim is against leaving things to either Mandy or Connor as they are both financially irresponsible. He claims Georgie would be the best choice, Audrey agrees but hates it. They consider spending everything on luxuries for themselves instead.
26	4	"Dirty Hands and a Barbed-Wire Fence"	Mark Cendrowski	Teleplay by : Chuck Lorre & Steven Molaro; Story by : Steve Holland & Yael Glouberman	November 6, 2025	T12.20204	5.69
After Pastor Jeff tells Georgie that Fred Fagenbacher has started repairing the church buses for free, Georgie and Ruben confront him over the phone. Fred again states he will drive them out of business. Ruben is worried how he will pay his rent. Georgie suggests they play dirty and sabotage Fred's tow trucks. Georgie and Ruben lie to the McAllisters that things are great and they may expand the business. Mandy suspects they are lying. That night, they sabotage the trucks by putting bleach in the fuel tanks, though Ruben is bitten by a guard dog when climbing back up the fence. Georgie refuses to tell Mandy anything but insists it is not an affair. Ruben also tells Mandy nothing. The scheme works to increase Georgie and Ruben's tow business but Georgie feels guilty and discusses it over a drink with Jim, who tells Georgie he got his hands dirty when starting out and never told Audrey; and that Georgie is a good man. Georgie gives Ruben money for his rent. Fred comes in saying he knows what they did and that it's not over.
27	5	"A Pregnancy Test and an Old Man's Prostate"	Mark Cendrowski	Teleplay by : Steve Holland & Connor Kilpatrick; Story by : Steven Molaro & Jim Reynolds	November 13, 2025	T12.20205	5.42
Mandy wants to take on more assignments at work so Scott offers her coverage of a meteor shower. He will be producing the piece so the two of them and some crew will be going away overnight. Georgie doesn't like this and Mandy says Georgie doesn't trust her. Georgie says it is about not trusting Scott. Ruben agrees with Georgie at the store. Georgie goes to the news station to confront Scott in person. Scott apologizes for causing them problems and offers to make another arrangement if Georgie wants. This calms Georgie and he accepts the trip. Mandy is annoyed Georgie went to her work. Mandy apologizes to Scott and he apologizes to her for how they broke up a long time ago. Mandy doesn't see any meteors and bores her coworker with facts about them instead during the segment. Meanwhile, Audrey finds a pregnancy test in the trash of Connor's bathroom. It is negative and Connor is angry with her about invading his privacy. As Jim goes to talk to Connor about apologizing to his mother, Connor admits Chloe broke up with him, relieved she wouldn't have a baby with him. Jim gives Connor a hug.
28	6	"Heartbreak and the Refuge of the Downtrodden"	Mark Cendrowski	Teleplay by : Steven Molaro & Nadiya Chettiar; Story by : Steve Holland & Connor Kilpatrick	November 20, 2025	T12.20206	5.72
Connor is still depressed about Chloe dumping him. Georgie tries to talk him through it, remembering how it felt back when Mandy dumped him. While watching movies late at night with him, Georgie falls asleep. Connor calls Chloe and it doesn't go well. Connor asks for Mandy's help in making a resume but he has no experience and minimal schooling. Instead, they start day-drinking together. Jim joins them and relates his first heartbreak before he was with Audrey. Audrey comes home to them playing beer pong and joins in. Georgie comes home and they all get drunk and eat pizza together. Connor decides to move on by focusing on his music. He writes a song about the Axolotl salamander, which can regenerate its heart. Though his family doesn't understand it, Connor sends a tape to Dr. Demento who likes it. [When the series was shown in the UK on TLC, this episode was omitted.]
29	7	"A Bus Bench and Faith out the Wazoo"	Nikki Lorre	Teleplay by : Steve Holland & Yael Glouberman; Story by : Steven Molaro & Jim Reynolds	December 4, 2025	T12.20207	5.78
Needing help with the store's accounting, Mandy suggests Georgie ask Mary. He does and Mary agrees so Audrey cannot do it. Audrey finds out and is upset as she did the books for years. Mary finishes and tells Georgie and Ruben they are struggling and need to cut expenses and that Georgie cannot afford to take an ad out on a bus bench at the moment. Georgie goes to Audrey and she reviews the books and has Georgie record a loss for a tax refund. Mary is furious when she sees the bench ad and realizes what Georgie did. Mary goes to talk to Audrey as Georgie can be overconfident with her house on the line. Mary and Audrey briefly get along, though start insulting each other again when they confront Georgie together. Meanwhile, Jim must renew his driver's license but fails the vision test. While driving with Mandy he's in a small fender-bender and gets a ticket for the expired license. Mandy takes him for driving glasses after threatening to tell Audrey. Jim easily passes the vision test afterwards.
30	8	"Bitin', Spankin' and a Load of Yankee Psychobabble"	Mark Cendrowski	Teleplay by : Steven Molaro & Connor Kilpatrick; Story by : Steve Holland & Alex Ayers	December 11, 2025	T12.20208	5.60
CeeCee has started biting people. Mandy refuses to bite her back, despite Audrey saying it worked on Mandy at that age. Georgie and Mandy trying to put on a puppet show about biting doesn't work. Later, Mandy is horrified to learn Audrey "nibbled" CeeCee after another incident at the park. Mary is happy for Mandy, Georgie and CeeCee to move into her house. Mary privately disapproves of Mandy cooking multiple meals to find one CeeCee will eat. CeeCee later throws a block at Mary's forehead. Mandy is against spanking, surprising Georgie, as Mary spanked him as a child. Mary tells Georgie that CeeCee lacks boundaries and he should talk to Mandy to reconsider her parenting methods. Mandy is upset they were talking behind her back, but the next day, Mandy calls into a family therapist's radio show in Chicago. Audrey also calls in when Mandy starts criticizing her. Jim also joins the call when Audrey learns he lied to her and never spanked Mandy as a child. Mary joins the call when Mandy also criticizes her, prompting Georgie also to call in as he listens in the store with Ruben.
31	9	"Payback and a Partial Shebang"	Mark Cendrowski	Teleplay by : Steve Holland & Jim Reynolds; Story by : Steven Molaro & Nadiya Chettiar	December 18, 2025	T12.20209	5.65
Someone has been sending Georgie on fake towing trips and ordering winter tires to the store. Georgie suspects Fred who warns them over the phone to watch themselves. Georgie and Ruben cannot afford security cameras, so they start taking turns staying at the store overnight. After supporting Georgie, Mandy confronts Fred and he tells her what happened to his trucks. Mandy is furious Georgie could go to jail if Fred had proof. Jim tries to tell Mandy that Georgie's heart is in the right place. The next night, Fred offers to buy Ruben out, and he is tempted by the stability. Georgie ignores Ruben's concerns and Ruben storms out. Mandy tells Georgie he sometimes does what he wants without thinking of others. Georgie goes to Ruben's house, meeting his grandmother and apologizing. Ruben stays with Georgie, bringing in his grandmother to visit the store and act as a tiebreaker for business decisions.
32	10	"Miami Beach and a Magical Family Christmas"	Mark Cendrowski	Teleplay by : Steven Molaro & Yael Glouberman; Story by : Steve Holland & Connor Kilpatrick	December 18, 2025	T12.20210	5.46
Mary plans on taking Missy to California to visit Sheldon for Christmas. This inspires Audrey to surprise everyone with a Christmas trip to Miami beach. Both Georgie and Mandy are initially uninterested, wanting to work. They start to reconsider, offending Ruben who had cancelled being with his family in Mexico as Georgie wanted to be open on Christmas. The news station wants Mandy to fill in on weekdays which would be good for her career. She convinces Jim to cancel and rebook the trip for two days later, despite the massive expense. Mary calls Georgie asking if Missy can spend Christmas with him as Missy is driving her crazy and Pasadena is not near a beach like Missy thought. Georgie convinces Jim to pay for Missy to join them. Everyone is stuck in traffic on the way to the airport and their first day on the beach has a major storm, while Missy unexpectedly bonds with Audrey. Connor sings to CeeCee in the hotel about various misfortunes on the trip that happened to everyone else. Back in Medford, Ruben shuts the store and leaves for the holidays to be with his family.
33	11	"A New Hobby, a Pervert and a Part-Time Job"	Mark Cendrowski	Teleplay by : Steve Holland & Nadiya Chettiar; Story by : Steven Molaro & Jim Reynolds	February 26, 2026	T12.20211	5.58
Jim has nothing to do, and is driving Audrey and Mandy crazy. He tries bird-watching but is mistaken for a pervert. He hints he would like to come back to the store part-time and for free. Despite Georgie being uncomfortable, the women and Ruben see no problem with it. Georgie shows Jim the new computerized inventory system. Jim accidentally deletes everything. After arguing, Jim leaves. At home, Georgie apologizes and Jim agrees to take a computer class, returning to the store as Audrey demands.
34	12	"The G Word and a Blaspheming Bimbo"	Mark Cendrowski	Teleplay by : Steven Molaro & Connor Kilpatrick; Story by : Steve Holland & Yael Glouberman	March 5, 2026	T12.20212	5.58
Mary and Pastor Jeff ask Mandy to cover the upcoming church carnival on the news. Georgie uses the broadcast to promote the store by placing his booth in view of the camera. During the broadcast, Mandy entertains the idea of God being a woman, leading many of her viewers to believe that she is mocking their faith. After receiving many angry phone calls, the news station considers suspending Mandy. She convinces them to let her issue a live apology. However, she does not retract her comments and instead says that she is sorry if her audience misunderstood her. Mandy is suspended and begins receiving hate mail while business slows down at the store. Georgie asks Mary to talk to Pastor Jeff, and he agrees to talk with Mandy on air. Audrey finds a letter from a young girl who found Mandy's comments inspiring, causing Mandy to think about the example she's setting for CeeCee. While on air with Pastor Jeff, Mandy realizes that she would not want her daughter to have to apologize for having an opinion and quits her job.
35	13	"A Big Birthday and Tequila Shots"	Mark Cendrowski	Teleplay by : Steve Holland & Jim Reynolds; Story by : Steven Molaro & Connor Kilpatrick	March 12, 2026	T12.20213	5.46
For Georgie's 21st birthday, he agrees to a quiet dinner with Mary and Missy. Ruben insists on taking him to a bar afterwards with Connor. Mandy is depressed without her job and takes Audrey's gift idea of a silver money clip shaped liked Texas. Mandy drinks heavily at Mary's and the bar and has no memory the next morning. Piecing it together, she acted drunkenly and called Scott at his home, to unsuccessfully beg for her job back. Georgie drove her home and she vomited on him and his truck, lamenting how Georgie has his life together when so young, and she must start over her career, again. The money clip was stuck in the plumbing in the morning. She goes to the store and apologizes and Georgie says he works hard and his life isn't easy. Mandy returns the money clip, but unknown to anybody, it was actually CeeCee who flushed it.
36	14	"Three Angry Women and a Prophylactic"	Mark Cendrowski	Teleplay by : Steven Molaro & Nadiya Chettiar; Story by : Steve Holland & Yael Glouberman	April 2, 2026	T12.20214	5.31
Mary is upset when she finds out that Missy has had sex with a boy who was using condoms in Missy's possession. It is later revealed that Mandy bought the condoms because she thought that Missy needs to be safe, and could not talk to Mary or Georgie about it. When Mary finds out about Mandy's involvement, she tells Georgie when she goes to confront Mandy. Georgie at first feels protective of Missy and is furious with Mandy for not being honest, but then becomes less certain. The four of them meet at the Cooper house with Pastor Jeff as mediator, but the meeting devolves into an argument that ends with Georgie deciding to take Mandy's side. Afterwards, they have sex in their car.
37	15	"A Stuffed Monkey and an Ex-Girlfriend"	Mark Cendrowski	Teleplay by : Steve Holland & Connor Kilpatrick; Story by : Steven Molaro & Jim Reynolds	April 9, 2026	T12.20215	5.70
CeeCee loses her stuffed monkey Beanie Baby and cannot sleep without it. As Connie returns from a vacation with Dale, Mandy goes to Mary and asks that Mary sew a new monkey for CeeCee. Mary does so but at the park, Connie realizes they are worth a lot to desperate mothers who want them for their kids. Mandy and Connie lie to Mary to get her to make more by telling her they're for a charity helping sick children. Mandy and Connie make a lot of money, though Ms. Hutchins the high school librarian realizes they're fakes. After Mary runs into a mother and child with one, she gets the idea for the Sunday School children to help make more. Meanwhile, Dr. Demento plays Connor's song and Chloe leaves him a message. Connor brings her to the house again, but rebuffs her trying to kiss him.
38	16	"Alpha Males and the Power of Prayer"	Mark Cendrowski	Teleplay by : Steven Molaro & Nadiya Chettiar; Story by : Steve Holland & Connor Kilpatrick	April 16, 2026	T12.20216	5.88
Fred is using the backlash against Mandy's God comments to draw business to him with a TV commercial. With Georgie and Ruben struggling, Mandy goes to Pastor Jeff to apologize for leaving their interview. Pastor Jeff has gotten backlash from young women and his wife for how he treated Mandy. A negotiation between Pastor Jeff, Mary, Georgie and Mandy results in the family going to the church twice a month and CeeCee will attend Sunday School when she's older. In exchange Pastor Jeff gives the church buses to Georgie, tells the congregation to go to his store, and to pray for Mandy. Mandy gets a job at another news channel that likes her controversy, Georgie and Mary believe the prayers worked. Meanwhile, Jim is stunned that Audrey still gives Connor allowance money. Audrey refuses to stop and they start a spending war. They offer to pay Connor to make his music but he doesn't make art for money. Jim storms off. Connor offers to find a job but Audrey says she cannot let Jim win.
39	17	"A Country Club, a Yokel and a New Boss"	Mark Cendrowski	Teleplay by : Steve Holland & Yael Glouberman; Story by : Steven Molaro & Jim Reynolds	April 23, 2026	T12.20217	5.13
Georgie gets the idea to use business money to join Medford's Country Club to gain access to wealthy people for the store. He is allowed to do this after promising Ruben's grandmother access to the Club perks. Audrey is interested in joining and teaches Georgie how to golf. Jim has no interest in it. While there, the manager says their policy is that only men are allowed to join, with their wives allowed in with them, so Audrey cannot join without Jim. Audrey wishes to storm off but Georgie and Mandy join anyway. Audrey calls Mandy a hypocrite and makes Jim understand why the sexism bothers her. Mandy's new boss wants her to focus on a women's centered story, so Mandy exposes the policy despite knowing that she and Georgie will get kicked out.
40	18	"A New Scoreboard and a Horse's You Know What"	Mark Cendrowski	Teleplay by : Steven Molaro & Connor Kilpatrick; Story by : Steve Holland & Nadiya Chettiar	April 30, 2026	T12.20218	5.61
Georgie takes a client from Fred and forgets about the 2-year anniversary of George's death. Having dinner with Mary and Missy, he thinks buying the high school a new scoreboard with George's name on it would be a great way to remember and memorialize his father. Using his sales skills and Missy's help selling cigarettes at school, he collects a significant amount but is still not close to the price. Principal Peterson calls Georgie and says Fred offered to buy the whole scoreboard, in exchange for having the Faghenbacher logo also on it. Georgie is upset and dreams about George replacing him with Fred as his son. Mandy tells Mary what is going on, and a furious Mary goes to Fred and gets him to back down and promise to apologize. Georgie is able to use the money he raised to instead name the school's football concession stand: The George Cooper Snack bar.
41	19	"A Little Schmoozin' and a Nose for the News"	Nikki Lorre	Teleplay by : Steve Holland & Jim Reynolds; Story by : Steven Molaro & Connor Kilpatrick	May 7, 2026	T12.20219	5.31
Georgie and Ruben join Medford's Chamber of Commerce. Georgie is the youngest member in its history and he thinks that would make a good news story to promote the store. Mandy doesn't like the idea. Georgie has Ruben contact Kelli, the replacement weather girl for Mandy at Channel 7. Mandy finds out about this and makes Georgie cancel the interview. Kelli makes reference to this on air. Mandy's boss at Channel 9 thinks a feud would be great for ratings so Mandy accuses Kelli of having a nose job. Kelli goes to the store and tells Georgie she doesn't want to set a bad example for women, but then makes reference on air to the time Mandy punched a woman at church. Mandy runs into Kelli at a coffee house, and they consider calling it off but both find it fun and good for ratings, so they agree to continue.
42	20	"Splurges and Secrets"	Mark Cendrowski	Teleplay by : Steven Molaro & Nadiya Chettiar; Story by : Chuck Lorre & Steve Holland	May 14, 2026	T12.20220	5.78
Audrey confirms for Georgie that the store has had its most profitable month ever. Georgie only wants to do responsible things with the money, though both Mandy and Ruben tell him to live a little, Ruben buying himself a Jeep. Mandy takes him clothes shopping, he likes a leather jacket and eventually gives in to buy it. Driving along, he sees and buys a jet ski. Mandy and Ruben are both less than thrilled and Audrey refuses to allow him to keep it at the house. Keeping it at the store causes a minor accident with Ruben's Jeep. Mary agrees to let him keep it in her driveway for a little while, though a montage of the future shows it still there seasons later. Meanwhile, Jim and Audrey think back to big purchases they made, Audrey is upset Jim went to the Super Bowl without her many years ago. Audrey says she has her own secret purchases. The only secret she confirms for Jim is that she knew his secret about going to casinos instead of tire conventions.
43	21	"Funky Chili and Friends Who Take Their Clothes Off"	Mark Cendrowski	Teleplay by : Steve Holland & Jim Reynolds; Story by : Steven Molaro & Rachel Intrieri	May 21, 2026	T12.20221	5.65
With Georgie and Ruben both down with bad food poisoning, Jim and Mandy take over the store. Jim teaches Mandy basic car mechanic tasks and tells her that, despite some detours in her life, he is proud of her. Audrey walks in on Chloe in Connor's bedroom. Connor says they are just friends and don't want to label their relationship. Audrey tries to act okay with it but really isn't, and is further alarmed when Connor says he is going to some music gigs with Chloe's friends who are mostly girls and they'll all sleep in a van. Georgie goes to Ruben's to recover and avoid his family's drama. Jim throws his back out and Mandy successfully finishes a few jobs at the store, though she has a nightmare about a tire coming loose and causing a fatal accident.
44	22	"A New Beau and Someone Else's Mom's House"	Mark Cendrowski	Teleplay by : Steven Molaro & Connor Kilpatrick; Story by : Steve Holland & Nadiya Chettiar	May 21, 2026	T12.20222	5.64
Georgie is irritated that Fred is attending Mary's Bible Study group at her house. Fred says he sincerely wants to change and Mary believes in helping him find God. Mandy tries to talk to Mary but it doesn't go well. Georgie and Mandy pay Connie to spy on Fred at the bar, but Connie and Fred hit it off. Connie tells Mary it is okay if she wants to be selfish and pursue Fred. Audrey is upset at the idea and that Mary thinks Fred dumped Audrey in high school, saying it was the other way around. At the next Bible Study, Georgie and Mandy attend. Fred admits his interest in Mary but says he won't bother Mary if she is not interested. Mary then asks out Fred, and he accepts. A furious Georgie threatens to ban Mary from seeing CeeCee, and Mary orders Georgie and Mandy out of her house. Connor finally calls Audrey from the road trip, from a police station.

=== Season 3 (2026) ===
No. overall	No. in season	Title	Directed by	Written by	Original release date	Prod. code	U.S. viewers (millions)
45	1	"Feminine Wiles and Some Tire Thing in Lubbock"	Mark Cendrowski	Teleplay by : Steve Holland & Connor Kilpatrick; Story by : Jim Reynolds & Nadiya Chettiar	October 8, 2026	T12.21301	5.50
After the argument with Mary over her dating Fred, Georgie and Mandy return home, with Mandy thinking Georgie may have gone too far and is being unfair to CeeCee. Connor doesn't tell Audrey anything and calls Georgie the next day at the store. He and the band were smoking pot, everyone else ran away, and he was the only one arrested. Travelling to Lubbock, Georgie pays Connor's $500 bail and $2000 fine and Connor must also complete 60 hours of community service. Georgie hides Connor at Ruben's. Feeling guilty, Mandy drops CeeCee off at Mary's that afternoon. Jim does the same that night and Audrey also does so, the next day. Georgie tells Mandy about Connor and she tells him about dropping off CeeCee. Over the phone Mary tells Georgie that all three of the McAlisters think he is wrong. Georgie goes to confront Audrey and Jim, but is stopped as Chloe is there and told them about Connor. Georgie later drops CeeCee off with Mary, though the tension with his mother hasn't changed.
46	2	"A Serious Journalist and Your Brain on Drugs"	Mark Cendrowski	Teleplay by : Maria Ferrari & Yael Glouberman; Story by : Steve Holland & Connor Kilpatrick	October 15, 2026	T12.21302	4.91
Mandy wants more serious stories as a reporter. She and Georgie take her boss, Lindsey, out to dinner. While there, Georgie sees Mary on a date with Fred. Georgie confronts them but Mary refuses to leave. Georgie fixates on them the entire evening, embarrassing Mandy. Mary drinks a lot of wine and rants about Georgie, not paying any attention to Fred. Fred decides to leave so Georgie can drive Mary home. Both Mandy and Mary criticize Georgie on ride. The next morning, Fred comes to Mary's with a hangover care package. They consider being just friends, but Mary kisses Fred. Meanwhile, Audrey isn't sure how to handle Connor anymore and he rejects her anti-drug pamphlets. Audrey tells Jim he was right and gives him permission to approach Connor how he sees fit. Connor admits his mistake, Jim admits he is happy Connor is living life outside the house and wants him to learn from it. Connor sells some of his instruments to begin paying Georgie back for the bail money and fine.
47	3	"A Germ Factory and a Good Mother"	Mark Cendrowski	Teleplay by : Jim Reynolds & Nadiya Chettiar; Story by : Steve Holland & Maria Ferrari	October 22, 2026	T12.21303	5.21
Mandy decides CeeCee should start preschool. This offends Audrey who loves watching her. Mandy says Audrey is just being selfish. On the first day, Mandy cannot let CeeCee go, so she takes her for ice cream instead. Mandy hides this from Audrey. Georgie goes with Mandy to drop CeeCee off the next day, they quickly change their minds and Georgie takes CeeCee to the store. CeeCee gets into things, runs outside and accidentally cuts her chin, needing stitches. Audrey is depressed, but rejects Jim's attempt to get her a puppy to fill the hole left by CeeCee. Audrey later comforts Mandy over the struggles of motherhood. CeeCee finally attends preschool but gets a cold that infects everyone except Connor; afterwards, the preschool calls to warn them about head lice.
48	4	"The Devil's Interval and a British Stripper"	Mark Cendrowski	Teleplay by : Steve Holland & Maria Ferrari; Story by : Connor Kilpatrick & Yael Glouberman	October 29, 2026	T12.21304	5.38
Still angry with Mary, Georgie asks Audrey to make CeeCee a dinosaur costume for Halloween. Mandy tells Mary this. Audrey struggles through sewing but makes one. Mary shows up with a better costume. Audrey reluctantly allows CeeCee to wear Mary's costume, but is annoyed all the houses keep complimenting how great it is. Audrey eggs the Cooper house as revenge. Mary had refused to let Missy out in a Spice Girls costume, and assumes Missy egged the house. Missy stays with the McAlisters when Mary refuses to believe Missy didn't do it. Jim and Ruben watch horror movies at the tire shop, where Jim tries to cheer up Ruben about still being single.
49	5	"A Snotty Attitude and a Party on a School Night"	Mark Cendrowski	Teleplay by : Jim Reynolds & Nadiya Chettiar; Story by : Steve Holland & Maria Ferrari	November 5, 2026	T12.21305	5.71
Missy quickly hits it off with Jim and Audrey. She moves into CeeCee's room and Georgie and Mandy have several uncomfortable nights with CeeCee in their bed. Jim lets Missy drive the Mustang while taking her to school. Mary begins falling apart, as she's driving her children away. Fred stops by the store to tell Georgie this but Georgie refuses to send Missy back. Mandy tries to talk Missy into going home but Missy points out it isn't Mandy's house either. Mandy visits Mary and suggests Mary apologize to Missy first. Missy calls Georgie to ask to go to a party, he says no, but Missy tricks Jim into letting her go. Mary comes over that night with Missy gone. While waiting, Georgie reflects that his mother is lonely and reluctantly approves of her seeing Fred if it makes her happy. Mary takes Missy home after both Mary and Georgie tell her she's in big trouble.
50	6	"A Ten-Year Reunion and an Outta-the-Box Thinker"	Mark Cendrowski	Teleplay by : Steve Holland & Yael Glouberman; Story by : Connor Kilpatrick & Matthew Molaro	November 12, 2026	T12.21306	5.96
Ruben attends a business class at the community college. His ideas make Georgie feel insecure. Georgie crashes the next class and tries to impress the professor. He keeps attending until Ruben snaps at him for being a high school dropout. Georgie struggles to study for a quiz, feeling again like he is just Sheldon's dumb brother. Mandy tries to help by rewarding Georgie for correct answers, though they end up sleeping together. Georgie decides the class isn't for him and admits Ruben is better at book smarts. However, Georgie's idea to charge yearly subscription fees for oil changes impresses Ruben. Meanwhile, Connor is invited to his ten-year high school reunion. Jim and Audrey don't want him to go, fearing he will be made fun of for living with his parents and not having a job. Georgie and Mandy encourage him to go, though Mandy is worried when he leaves with his accordion. At the reunion, everyone loves Connor's music.
51	7	"A Party Sub and a Six-Legged Fan"	Nikki Lorre	Teleplay by : Connor Kilpatrick & Maria Ferrari; Story by : Steve Holland & Jamie Laski	November 19, 2026	T12.21307	TBD
Hank, owner of the local hardware store, has work done on his vehicle. Georgie asks him to pay, despite him being a long-time friend of Jim that gets stuff for free. Jim confronts Georgie saying loyalty and integrity to friends is more important. Georgie apologizes to Hank but Hank mentions his deal with Jim was to give each other free stuff at their respective stores. Ruben realizes Jim has the same deal with businesses across town. Jim tries to apologize with a large sandwich he got for free. Since Georgie lives in the house for free, he lets Jim keep two deals, and Jim chooses the hardware store and the nail salon for Audrey. Meanwhile, Mandy is upset Kelli got promoted to the news morning show at the other channel. She is pulled over by Officer Jake, who used to extort Connie's casino. Jake wants to be sheriff and takes Mandy along for a live bust of some movie and music bootleggers. A cockroach goes down her shirt and she freaks out, ruining the bust, and is made fun of across several TV channels. Audrey tells her she is resilient and offers to take her to the nail salon.
52	8	"A New Organist and an Apartment with a Pool"	Mark Cendrowski	Teleplay by : Steve Holland & Nadiya Chettiar; Story by : Chuck Lorre & Jamie Laski	December 3, 2026	TBA	TBD
53	9	"A Community Center and the Sexiest Kind of Tub"	Mark Cendrowski	Teleplay by : Jim Reynolds & Connor Kilpatrick; Story by : Steve Holland & Yael Glouberman	December 10, 2026	TBA	TBD

== Production ==
=== Development ===
In January 2024, it was announced that a spin-off of Young Sheldon was in development at CBS. In March 2024, it was announced that CBS had greenlit the Young Sheldon spin-off.

The show focuses on the characters of young married parents Georgie Cooper (Montana Jordan) and Mandy McAllister (Emily Osment) "navigating the challenges of adulthood, parenting, and marriage." It was also announced that co-creators Chuck Lorre, Steven Molaro, and Steve Holland would be writing and executive producing the spin-off series. In May 2024, the title of the series, Georgie & Mandy's First Marriage, was announced, and in July 2024, it was announced that the series would premiere on October 17, 2024, on CBS. The series returns to the formula used in The Big Bang Theory, such as using a multi-camera setup and laugh tracks, which Young Sheldon lacked.

The series is executive produced by Chuck Lorre, Steven Molaro, and Steve Holland. Lorre's own Chuck Lorre Productions produces the series alongside Warner Bros. Television as with the other series in The Big Bang Theory franchise. In October 2024, CBS gave the series a full-season order, making the total of 22 episodes. In February 2025, CBS renewed the series for a second season. In January 2026, CBS renewed the series for a third season.

=== Casting ===
In March 2024, it was announced that Montana Jordan and Emily Osment were set to reprise their characters, George "Georgie" Cooper Jr. and Amanda "Mandy" McAllister, from Young Sheldon. In May 2024, it was announced that Will Sasso and Rachel Bay Jones were added as series regulars, reprising their roles as Mandy's parents, Jim McAllister and Audrey McAllister, from Young Sheldon.

In July 2024, it was announced that Zoe Perry, Annie Potts, and Raegan Revord were set to guest star in the series, reprising their respective characters, Mary Cooper, Constance "Connie" Tucker, and Melissa "Missy" Cooper, from Young Sheldon. Also in July 2024, it was announced that Dougie Baldwin had been cast as Mandy's brother, Connor McAllister, and Jessie Prez had been cast as Ruben, an employee at Jim's tire store. Baldwin replaces Joseph Apollonio who was originally cast as Connor in Young Sheldon. In September 2024, it was reported that Craig T. Nelson was set to guest star, reprising his role as Dale Ballard. In November 2024, it was announced that Matt Hobby was set to guest star, reprising his role as Pastor Jeff Difford. In December 2024, it was announced that Doc Farrow would be reprising his role as Coach Wilkins, George's best friend and coworker at Medford High School. In January 2025, it was announced that Lance Barber would reprise his role as George Cooper in a dream sequence.

=== Filming ===
The series is filmed in front of a live audience at Warner Bros. Studios in Burbank, California, on the sound stage where The Big Bang Theory was previously filmed. The series began filming in July 2024.

== Release ==
=== Broadcast ===
The series premiered on CBS on October 17, 2024. The second season premiered on October 16, 2025. In Canada, the series airs on CTV and CTV Comedy Channel, and is available to stream on Crave. In Southeast Asia, Georgie and Mandy's First Marriage also premiered on December 20, 2024, at 8:35pm (7:35pm JKT) on Warner TV Asia. In the Netherlands, the series streams on HBO Max, where the first episode was released on March 27, 2025, with new episodes streaming each subsequent Thursday. In the United Kingdom and Ireland, the series premiered on TLC on January 18, 2026.

The third season premiered on CBS on October 8, 2026, with the UK premiere a day later on HBO Max.

=== Home media ===
Warner Bros. Home Entertainment released the first season of the series on DVD in Region 1 on October 7, 2025. The second season was released on November 3, 2026.

=== Streaming media ===
The first season was added to HBO Max on August 7, 2026, followed by the second season the following month on September 8, 2026.

== Reception ==
=== Critical response ===
The review aggregator website Rotten Tomatoes reported an 89% approval rating with an average rating of 9/10, based on nine critic reviews. Metacritic, which uses a weighted average, assigned a score of 61 out of 100 based on eight critics, indicating "generally favorable" reviews.

=== Ratings ===
==== Season 1 ====
Viewership and ratings per episode of Georgie & Mandy's First Marriage
No.	Title	Air date	Rating/share (18–49)	Viewers (millions)	DVR (18–49)	DVR viewers (millions)	Total (18–49)	Total viewers (millions)	Ref.
1	"The 6:10 to Lubbock"	October 17, 2024	0.5/5	6.56	0.2	1.93	0.7	8.50	
2	"Some New York Nonsense"	October 24, 2024	0.5/6	6.40	0.1	1.69	0.7	8.10	
3	"Secrets, Lies and a Chunk of Change"	October 31, 2024	0.5/6	6.19	0.2	1.56	0.6	7.76	
4	"Todd's Mom"	November 7, 2024	0.4/5	6.15	0.2	1.67	0.6	7.83	
5	"Thanksgiving"	November 14, 2024	0.5/5	6.39	0.2	1.81	0.7	8.20	
6	"A Regular Samaritan"	December 5, 2024	0.4/5	6.18	0.1	1.54	0.6	7.72	
7	"An Old Mustang"	December 12, 2024	0.4/5	6.51	0.1	1.48	0.5	7.99	
8	"Diet Crap"	January 30, 2025	0.4/6	6.38	0.2	1.70	0.6	8.08	
9	"A Tire Convention and the Moral High Ground"	February 6, 2025	0.5/6	6.59	0.1	1.55	0.6	8.14	
10	"A House Divided"	February 13, 2025	0.4/6	6.49	0.2	1.55	0.6	8.05	
11	"Working for the Enemy"	February 20, 2025	0.5/5	6.57	0.2	1.61	0.6	8.19	
12	"Typhoid Georgie"	February 27, 2025	0.5/7	6.46	0.2	1.68	0.6	8.14	
13	"McAllister Auto Loves the Ladies"	March 6, 2025	0.5/8	6.91	0.2	1.55	0.7	8.47	
14	"A Sportsbook and a Breakup"	March 13, 2025	0.5/7	6.27	0.1	1.51	0.6	7.78	
15	"Goddess of the Music Store"	April 3, 2025	0.4/6	5.93	0.2	1.80	0.6	7.69	
16	"Baby Fight"	April 10, 2025	0.4/5	5.98	0.2	1.72	0.5	7.70	
17	"Two Idiots on a Dirt Bike"	April 17, 2025	0.5/8	5.80	0.1	1.71	0.6	7.51	
18	"TV Money"	April 24, 2025	0.4/5	5.93	0.2	1.56	0.5	7.44	
19	"Snitch v. Deadbeat"	May 1, 2025	0.4/6	5.63	0.1	1.60	0.5	7.23	
20	"Ladies Love Brunch"	May 8, 2025	0.4/6	5.64	0.2	1.71	0.5	7.34	
21	"Guilt Boots"	May 15, 2025	0.4/6	5.62	0.2	1.50	0.6	7.11	
22	"Big Decisions"	May 15, 2025	0.4/6	6.00	0.2	1.72	0.6	7.71	

==== Season 2 ====
Viewership and ratings per episode of Georgie & Mandy's First Marriage
No.	Title	Air date	Rating/share (18–49)	Viewers (millions)	DVR (18–49)	DVR viewers (millions)	Total (18–49)	Total viewers (millions)	Ref.
1	"A Tie Breaker and a Huge Mistake"	October 16, 2025	0.4/5	4.83	0.2	1.67	0.6	6.52	
2	"Fan Mail and Old-Timey Organ Music"	October 23, 2025	0.4/5	5.18	0.2	1.37	0.6	6.55	
3	"A Will and a Dead Man's Wife"	October 30, 2025	0.4/5	5.36	0.2	1.56	0.5	6.92	
4	"Dirty Hands and a Barbed-Wire Fence"	November 6, 2025	0.4/5	5.69	0.1	1.07	0.5	6.76	
5	"A Pregnancy Test and an Old Man's Prostate"	November 13, 2025	0.4/5	5.42	TBD	TBD	TBD	TBD	
6	"Heartbreak and the Refuge of the Downtrodden"	November 20, 2025	0.4/5	5.72	TBD	TBD	TBD	TBD	
