= The Big Bang Theory =

American television sitcom (2007–2019)

- Genre: Sitcom
- Created by: Chuck Lorre; Bill Prady
- Showrunners: Bill Prady; Steven Molaro; Steve Holland
- Directed by: Mark Cendrowski
- Starring: Johnny Galecki; Jim Parsons; Kaley Cuoco; Simon Helberg; Kunal Nayyar; Sara Gilbert; Mayim Bialik; Melissa Rauch; Kevin Sussman; Laura Spencer
- Theme music composer: Barenaked Ladies
- Opening theme: "Big Bang Theory Theme"
- Country of origin: United States
- Original language: English
- No. of seasons: 12
- No. of episodes: 279 (list of episodes)

Production
- Executive producers: Chuck Lorre; Bill Prady; Lee Aronsohn; Steven Molaro; Eric Kaplan; Maria Ferrari; Dave Goetsch; Steve Holland; Tara Hernandez
- Producer: Faye Oshima Belyeu
- Editor: Peter Chakos
- Camera setup: Multi-camera
- Running time: 18–22 minutes
- Production companies: Chuck Lorre Productions; Warner Bros. Television

Original release
- Network: CBS
- Release: September 24, 2007 – May 16, 2019

Related
- Young Sheldon; Georgie & Mandy's First Marriage; Stuart Fails to Save the Universe

The Big Bang Theory is an American television sitcom created by Chuck Lorre and Bill Prady for CBS. It aired from September 24, 2007, to May 16, 2019, running for 12 seasons and 279 episodes.

The show originally centered on five characters living in Pasadena, California: Leonard Hofstadter (Johnny Galecki) and Sheldon Cooper (Jim Parsons), both physicists at the California Institute of Technology, who share an apartment; Penny (Kaley Cuoco), a waitress and aspiring actress who lives across the hall; and Leonard and Sheldon's similarly geeky and socially awkward friends and coworkers, aerospace engineer Howard Wolowitz (Simon Helberg), and astrophysicist Raj Koothrappali (Kunal Nayyar). Over time, supporting characters were promoted to starring roles, including neuroscientist Amy Farrah Fowler (Mayim Bialik), microbiologist Bernadette Rostenkowski (Melissa Rauch), and comic book store owner Stuart Bloom (Kevin Sussman).

The series was filmed in front of a live audience and produced by Chuck Lorre Productions, with Warner Bros. Television handling distribution. While the first season received mixed reviews, critical reception improved in subsequent seasons. Seven seasons ranked within the top ten of the final-season ratings, and the series reached the No. 1 spot in its eleventh season. It was nominated for the Emmy Award for Outstanding Comedy Series from 2011 to 2014 and won the Emmy Award for Outstanding Lead Actor in a Comedy Series four times for Parsons, totaling seven Emmy Awards from 46 nominations. Parsons also won the Golden Globe for Best Actor in a Television Comedy Series in 2011.

The success of The Big Bang Theory launched a multimedia franchise. A prequel series focusing on Parsons' character Sheldon Cooper, Young Sheldon, aired from 2017 to 2024, with Parsons narrating as the adult Sheldon. The third series in the franchise, a sequel to Young Sheldon titled Georgie & Mandy's First Marriage, premiered in October 2024 and follows Sheldon's older brother, Georgie, and his wife, Mandy. A fourth series, following Stuart Bloom, his girlfriend Denise, geologist Bert Kibbler, and physicist Barry Kripke, titled Stuart Fails to Save the Universe, premiered in July 2026 on streaming platform HBO Max.

== Cast and characters ==
Main characters of The Big Bang Theory

- Johnny Galecki as Leonard Hofstadter: An experimental physicist with an IQ of 173, who received his Ph.D. when he was 24 years old. Leonard is a nerd who loves video games, comic books, and Dungeons & Dragons. Leonard is the straight man of the series, sharing an apartment in Pasadena, CA, with Sheldon Cooper. Leonard is smitten upon meeting his new neighbor, Penny, and they eventually marry.
- Jim Parsons as Sheldon Cooper: Originally from Galveston, Texas, Sheldon was a child prodigy with an eidetic memory who began college at the age of eleven and earned a Ph.D. at age sixteen. He is a theoretical physicist researching quantum mechanics and string theory, and, despite his IQ of 187, he finds many routine aspects of social situations difficult to grasp. He is determined to have his own way, continually boasts of his intelligence, and has an extremely ritualized way of living. Despite these quirks, he begins a relationship with Amy Farrah Fowler, and they eventually marry.
- Kaley Cuoco as Penny: An aspiring actress from Omaha, Nebraska. Penny moves in across the hall from Sheldon and Leonard. She waits tables and occasionally tends the bar at The Cheesecake Factory. After giving up hope of becoming a successful actress, Penny becomes a pharmaceutical sales representative. Penny becomes friends with Bernadette and Amy, and they often hang out in each other's apartments. Penny and Leonard form a relationship and eventually marry.
- Simon Helberg as Howard Wolowitz: An aerospace engineer who got his master's degree at the Massachusetts Institute of Technology. Howard is Jewish and lived with his mother, Debbie (Carol Ann Susi). Unlike Sheldon, Leonard, Raj, Bernadette, and Amy, Howard does not hold a doctorate. He trains as an astronaut and goes into space as a payload specialist on the International Space Station. Howard initially fancies himself as a ladies man, but he later starts dating Bernadette, and they get engaged and married. Howard also has a tendency to waste money on toys and argues with Bernadette because of his oddly low income as an engineer and her high income as a pharmaceutical biochemist.
- Kunal Nayyar as Rajesh "Raj" Koothrappali: A particle astrophysicist originally from New Delhi, India. Initially, Raj had selective mutism, rendering him unable to talk to or be around women unless under the influence of alcohol. Raj also has very feminine tastes and often takes on a stereotypical female role in his friendship with Howard as well as in the group of four men. Raj later dates Lucy (Kate Micucci), who also suffers from social anxiety, but it eventually ends. He later speaks to Penny without alcohol, overcoming his selective mutism. He begins dating Emily Sweeney, and their relationship later becomes exclusive. In the series' final season, Raj has an on-again, off-again engagement with a hotel concierge named Anu (Rati Gupta). He also has a Yorkshire Terrier named Cinnamon, a gift from Howard and Bernadette.
- Melissa Rauch as Bernadette Rostenkowski-Wolowitz (recurring season 3, starring seasons 4‍–‍12): A young woman who initially is a co-worker at The Cheesecake Factory with Penny to pay her way through graduate school, where she is studying microbiology. Bernadette is introduced to Howard by Penny; at first, they do not get along, apparently having nothing in common. They date and later get engaged, married, and had 2 kids. Although generally a sweet and good-natured person, Bernadette has a short fuse and can be vindictive and lash out when provoked.
- Mayim Bialik as Amy Farrah Fowler (guest star season 3, starring seasons 4‍–‍12): A woman selected by an online dating site as Sheldon's perfect mate, Amy is from Glendale, California. While she and Sheldon initially share social cluelessness, after befriending Penny and Bernadette, she eventually becomes more interested in social and romantic interaction. Her relationship with Sheldon slowly progresses to the point where Sheldon considers her his girlfriend, and eventually, they get married. Amy believes she and Penny are best friends, a sentiment that Penny does not initially share. Amy has a Ph.D. in neurobiology.
- Kevin Sussman as Stuart Bloom (recurring seasons 2‍–‍5, 7, starring seasons 6, 8‍–‍12): A mild-mannered, under-confident owner of a comic book store. A competent artist, Stuart is a graduate of the prestigious Rhode Island School of Design. Though he is socially awkward, he possesses slightly better social skills. Stuart implies he is in financial trouble and that the comic book store now also is his home. He is later invited to join the guys' group while Howard is in space. Stuart gets a new job caring for Howard's mother later. After Mrs. Wolowitz's death, Stuart continues to live in her home, along with Howard and Bernadette, until he finds a place of his own.
- Laura Spencer as Emily Sweeney (recurring seasons 7‍–‍8, 10, starring season 9): A dermatologist at Huntington Hospital. Emily went to Harvard and delights in the macabre, and she states that she likes her job because she can cut things with knives. Prior to meeting Raj, Emily was set up on a blind date with Howard. After finding Emily's online dating profile, Raj has Amy contact her as his wingman instead. Their relationship becomes exclusive, but Raj later breaks up with Emily when he becomes infatuated with Claire (Alessandra Torresani), a bartender and children's author.
- Sara Gilbert as Leslie Winkle (recurring season 1, starring season 2, guest seasons 3, 9): A physicist who works in the same lab as Leonard. In appearance, she is essentially Leonard's female counterpart and has conflicting scientific theories with Sheldon. Leslie has casual sex with Leonard and later Howard. Gilbert was promoted to a main cast member during the second season but resumed guest star status because producers could not come up with enough material for the character. Gilbert returned to The Big Bang Theory for its 200th episode.

== Episodes ==
| Season | Episodes | Originally released | | Viewers rank | U.S. Viewers (millions) | 18–49 rank | 18–49 rating/share |
| Season | Episodes | First released | Last released | Viewers rank | U.S. Viewers (millions) | 18–49 rank | 18–49 rating/share |
|---|---|---|---|---|---|---|---|
| 1 | 17 | September 24, 2007 | May 19, 2008 | 68 | 8.34 | 46 | 3.3/8 |
| 2 | 23 | September 22, 2008 | May 11, 2009 | 40 | 10.07 | 22 | 3.8 |
| 3 | 23 | September 21, 2009 | May 24, 2010 | 12 | 14.22 | 5 | 5.3/13 |
| 4 | 24 | September 23, 2010 | May 19, 2011 | 13 | 13.21 | 7 | 4.4/13 |
| 5 | 24 | September 22, 2011 | May 10, 2012 | 8 | 15.82 | 6 | 5.5/17 |
| 6 | 24 | September 27, 2012 | May 16, 2013 | 3 | 18.68 | 2 | 6.2/19 |
| 7 | 24 | September 26, 2013 | May 15, 2014 | 2 | 19.96 | 2 | 6.2/20 |
| 8 | 24 | September 22, 2014 | May 7, 2015 | 2 | 19.05 | 4 | 5.6/17 |
| 9 | 24 | September 21, 2015 | May 12, 2016 | 2 | 20.36 | 3 | 5.8/19 |
| 10 | 24 | September 19, 2016 | May 11, 2017 | 2 | 18.99 | 3 | 4.9/19 |
| 11 | 24 | September 25, 2017 | May 10, 2018 | 1 | 18.63 | 5 | 4.4 |
| 12 | 24 | September 24, 2018 | May 16, 2019 | 2 | 17.31 | 6 | 3.6 |

== Production ==
The show's pilot episode premiered on September 24, 2007. This was the second pilot produced for the show. A different pilot was produced for the 2006‍–‍07 television season but never aired. The structure of the original unaired pilot was different from the series' eventual form. The only main characters retained in both pilots were Leonard (Johnny Galecki) and Sheldon (Jim Parsons), who are named after Sheldon Leonard, a longtime figure in episodic television as a producer, director, and actor. A minor character, Althea (Vernee Watson), appeared in the first scene of both pilots that was retained generally as-is. The first pilot included two female lead characters - Katie, "a street-hardened, tough-as-nails woman with a vulnerable interior" (played by Canadian actress Amanda Walsh), and Gilda, a scientist colleague and friend of the male characters (played by Iris Bahr). Sheldon and Leonard meet Katie after she breaks up with a boyfriend, and they invite her to share their apartment. Gilda is threatened by Katie's presence. Test audiences reacted negatively to Katie, but they liked Sheldon and Leonard. The original pilot used Thomas Dolby's hit "She Blinded Me with Science" as its theme song.

Although the original pilot was not picked up, its creators were given an opportunity to retool it and produce a second pilot. They brought in the remaining cast and retooled the show to its final format. Katie was replaced by Penny (Kaley Cuoco). The original unaired pilot has never been officially released, but it has circulated on the Internet. On the evolution of the show, Chuck Lorre said, "We did the 'Big Bang Pilot' about two and a half years ago, and it sucked ... but there were two remarkable things that worked perfectly, and that was Johnny and Jim. We rewrote the thing entirely, and then we were blessed with Kaley and Simon and Kunal." As to whether the world will ever see the original pilot on a future DVD release, Lorre said, "Wow, that would be something. We will see. Show your failures..."

The first and second pilots of The Big Bang Theory were directed by James Burrows, who did not continue with the show. The reworked second pilot led to a 13-episode order by CBS on May 14, 2007. Prior to its airing on CBS, the pilot episode was distributed on iTunes free of charge. The show premiered on September 24, 2007, and was picked up for a full 22-episode season on October 19, 2007. The show was filmed in front of a live audience, and it is produced by Chuck Lorre Productions and Warner Bros. Television. Production was halted on November 6, 2007, due to the Writers Guild of America strike. Nearly three months later, on February 4, 2008, the series was temporarily replaced by a short-lived sitcom, Welcome to The Captain. The series returned on March 17, 2008, in an earlier time slot, and ultimately only 17 episodes were produced for the first season.

After the strike ended, the show was picked up for a second season, airing in the 2008‍–‍2009 season, premiering in the same time slot on September 22, 2008. With increasing ratings, the show received a two-year renewal through the 2010‍–‍11 season in 2009. In 2011, the show was picked up for three more seasons. In March 2014, the show was renewed again for three more years through the 2016‍–‍17 season. This marked the second time the series gained a three-year renewal. In March 2017, the series was renewed for two additional seasons, bringing its total to 12, and running through the 2018‍–‍19 television season.

Several of the actors on The Big Bang Theory previously worked together on the sitcom Roseanne, including Johnny Galecki, Sara Gilbert, Laurie Metcalf (who plays Sheldon's mother, Mary Cooper), and Meagen Fay (who plays Bernadette's mother). Additionally, Lorre was a writer on the series for several seasons.

=== Science consultants ===
David Saltzberg, a professor of physics and astronomy at the University of California, Los Angeles, checked scripts and provided dialogue, mathematics equations, and diagrams used as props. According to series co-creator Bill Prady, Sheldon was given an actual equation to be worked on throughout the first season, with the actual progress displayed on whiteboards in Sheldon and Leonard's apartment. Saltzberg, who has a Ph.D. in physics, served as the science consultant for the show for six seasons and attended every taping. He saw early versions of scripts that needed scientific information added to them, and he also pointed out where the writers, despite their knowledge of science, had made a mistake. He was usually not needed during a taping unless a lot of science, and especially the whiteboard, was involved.

Saltzberg sometimes consulted with Mayim Bialik, who has a Ph.D. in neuroscience, on the subject of biology.

=== Theme song ===
Single cover for "Big Bang Theory Theme" by Barenaked Ladies (2007)

The Canadian alternative rock band Barenaked Ladies wrote and recorded the show's theme song, which describes the history and formation of the universe and the Earth. Co-lead singer Ed Robertson was asked by Lorre and Prady to write a theme song for the show after the producers attended one of the band's concerts in Los Angeles. Coincidentally, Robertson had recently read Simon Singh's 2004 book Big Bang, and at the concert he improvised a freestyle rap about the origins of the universe. Lorre and Prady phoned him shortly thereafter and asked him to write the theme song. Having been asked to write songs for other films and shows, but ending up being rejected because producers favored songs by other artists, Robertson agreed to write the theme only after learning that Lorre and Prady had not asked anyone else.

In October 2007, a full-length (1 minute and 45 seconds) version of the song was released commercially. Although some unofficial pages identify the song title as "History of Everything," the cover art for the single identifies the title as "Big Bang Theory Theme." A music video also was released via special features on The Complete Fourth Season DVD and Blu-ray set. The theme was included on the band's greatest hits album, Hits from Yesterday & the Day Before, released on September 27, 2011. In September 2015, TMZ uncovered court documents showing that Steven Page sued former bandmate Robertson over the song, alleging that he was promised 20 percent of the proceeds, but that Robertson has kept that money for himself.

=== Actors' salaries ===
For the first three seasons, Galecki, Parsons, and Cuoco, the three main stars of the show, received up to $60,000 per episode. Their salaries rose to $200,000 per episode for the fourth season, then went up an additional $50,000 in each of the following three seasons, culminating in $350,000 per episode in the seventh season. In September 2013, Bialik and Rauch renegotiated the contracts they held since they were introduced to the series in 2010. On their old contracts, each was making $20,000–$30,000 per episode, while the new contracts doubled that, beginning at $60,000 per episode, increasing steadily to $100,000 per episode by the end of the contract, as well as adding another year for both.

By season seven, Galecki, Parsons, and Cuoco were also receiving 0.25 percent of the series' back-end money. Before production began on the eighth season, the three plus Helberg and Nayyar looked to renegotiate new contracts, with Galecki, Parsons, and Cuoco seeking around $1 million per episode, as well as more back-end money. Contracts were signed in the beginning of August 2014, giving the three principal actors an estimated $1 million per episode for three years, with the possibility to extend for a fourth year. The deals also include larger pieces of the show, signing bonuses, production deals, and advances towards the back-end. Helberg and Nayyar were also able to renegotiate their contracts, giving them a per-episode pay in the "mid-six-figure range", up from around $100,000 per episode they each received in years prior. The duo, who were looking to have salary parity with Parsons, Galecki, and Cuoco, signed their contracts after the studio and producers threatened to write the characters out of the series if a deal could not be reached before the start of production on season eight. By season 10, Helberg and Nayyar reached the $1 million per episode parity with Galecki, Parsons, and Cuoco, due to a clause in their deals signed in 2014.

In March 2017, the main cast members (Galecki, Parsons, Cuoco, Helberg, and Nayyar) took a 10 percent pay cut to allow Bialik and Rauch an increase in their earnings. This put Galecki, Parsons, Cuoco, Helberg and Nayyar at $900,000 per episode, with Parsons, Galecki, and Helberg also receiving overall deals with Warner Bros. Television. By the end of April, Bialik and Rauch had signed deals to earn $500,000 per episode each, with the deals also including a separate development component for both actors. The deal was an increase from the $175,000–$200,000 the duo had been making per episode.

== Recurring themes and elements ==
=== Science ===
Much of the series focuses on science, particularly physics. The four main male characters are employed at Caltech and have science-related occupations, as do Bernadette and Amy. The characters frequently banter about scientific theories or news and make science-related jokes.

Science has also interfered with the characters' romantic lives. Leslie breaks up with Leonard when he sides with Sheldon in his support for string theory rather than loop quantum gravity. When Leonard joins Sheldon, Raj, and Howard on a three-month Arctic research trip, it separates Leonard and Penny at a time when their relationship is budding. When Bernadette takes an interest in Leonard's work, it makes both Penny and Howard envious and results in Howard confronting Leonard and Penny asking Sheldon to teach her physics. Sheldon and Amy also briefly end their relationship after an argument over which of their fields is superior.

As the theme of the show revolves around science, many distinguished and high-profile scientists have appeared as guest stars on the show. Astrophysicist and Nobel laureate George Smoot had a cameo appearance in the second season. Chemical engineer and Nobel laureate Frances Arnold portrayed herself in the 12th season. Theoretical physicist Brian Greene appeared in the fourth season, as well as astrophysicist, science popularizer, and physics outreach specialist Neil deGrasse Tyson, who also appeared in the twelfth season. Cosmologist Stephen Hawking made a short guest appearance in a fifth-season episode; in the eighth season, Hawking video conferences with Sheldon and Leonard, and he makes another appearance in the 200th episode. In the fifth and sixth seasons, NASA astronaut Michael J. Massimino played himself multiple times in the role of Howard's fellow astronaut. In the sixth season, NASA astronaut Buzz Aldrin had a cameo appearance. Bill Nye appeared in the seventh and twelfth seasons.

=== "Nerd" media ===
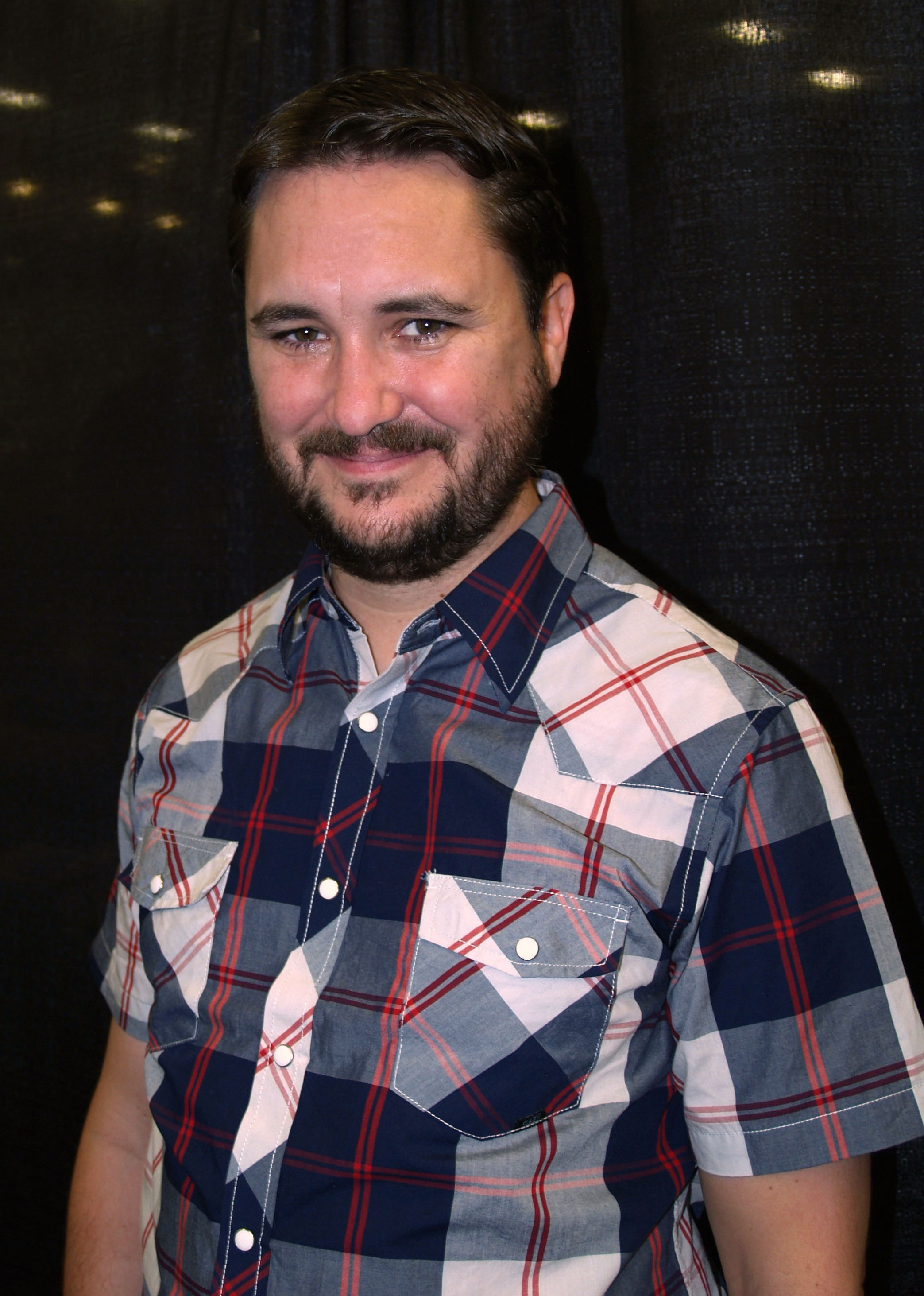
Star Trek: The Next Generation actor Wil Wheaton has a recurring role as a fictional version of himself on the show.

The four main male characters are all avid fans of nerd culture. Among their shared interests are science fiction, fantasy, comic books, and collecting memorabilia.

Star Trek in particular is referred to frequently, and Sheldon identifies strongly with the character of Spock, so much so that when he is given a used napkin signed by Leonard Nimoy as a Christmas gift from Penny, he is overwhelmed with excitement and gratitude ("I possess the DNA of Leonard Nimoy?!"). Star Trek: The Original Series cast members William Shatner and George Takei have made guest appearances, and Leonard Nimoy made a guest appearance as the voice of Sheldon's vintage Mr. Spock action figure. Star Trek: The Next Generation cast members Brent Spiner and LeVar Burton have had guest appearances as themselves, while Wil Wheaton has a recurring role as a fictionalized version of himself. Leonard and Sheldon have had conversations in Klingon.

They are also fans of Star Wars, Battlestar Galactica, and Doctor Who. James Earl Jones, Carrie Fisher and Mark Hamill made guest appearances. In the episode "The Ornithophobia Diffusion", when there is a delay in watching Star Wars on Blu-ray, Howard complains, "If we don't start soon, George Lucas is going to change it again" (referring to Lucas' controversial alterations to the films). In "The Hot Troll Deviation", Katee Sackhoff of Battlestar Galactica appeared as Howard's fantasy dream girl. The characters have different tastes in franchises, with Sheldon praising Firefly but disapproving of Leonard's enjoyment of Babylon 5. With regard to fantasy, the four make frequent references to The Lord of the Rings and Harry Potter novels and movies. Additionally, Howard can speak Sindarin, one of the two Elvish languages from The Lord of the Rings.

Wednesday night is the group's designated "comic book night" because that is the day of the week when new comic books are released. The comic book store is run by fellow geek and recurring character Stuart. On a number of occasions, the group members have dressed up as pop culture characters, including The Flash, Aquaman, Frodo Baggins, Superman, Batman, Spock, The Doctor, Green Lantern, and Thor. As a consequence of losing a bet to Stuart and Wil Wheaton, the group members are forced to visit the comic book store dressed as Catwoman, Wonder Woman, Batgirl, and Supergirl. DC Comics announced that, to promote its comics, the company would sponsor Sheldon wearing Green Lantern T-shirts.

Various games have been featured, as well as referred to, on the series (e.g. World of Warcraft, Halo, Mario, Donkey Kong, etc.), including fictional games like Mystic Warlords of Ka'a (which became a reality in 2011) and Rock-paper-scissors-lizard-Spock.

=== Leonard and Penny's relationship ===
One of the recurring plot lines is the relationship between Leonard and Penny. Leonard becomes attracted to Penny in the pilot episode, and his need to do favors for her is a frequent point of humor in the first season. Meanwhile, Penny dates a series of muscular, stereotypically "attractive," unintelligent, and insensitive jocks. Their first long-term relationship begins when Leonard returns from a three-month expedition to the North Pole in the season 3 premiere. However, when Leonard tells Penny that he loves her, she realizes she cannot say it back, and they break up. Both Leonard and Penny go on to date other people, most notably with Leonard dating Raj's sister Priya for much of season 4. This relationship is jeopardized when Leonard mistakenly comes to believe that Raj has slept with Penny, and it ultimately ends when Priya sleeps with a former boyfriend in "The Good Guy Fluctuation".

Penny, who admits to missing Leonard in "The Roommate Transmogrification", accepts his request to renew their relationship in "The Beta Test Initiation". After Penny suggests having sex in "The Launch Acceleration", Leonard breaks the mood by proposing to her. Penny says "no" but does not break up with him. She stops a proposal a second time in "The Tangible Affection Proof". In the sixth-season episode, "The 43 Peculiarity", Penny finally tells Leonard that she loves him. Although they both feel jealousy when the other receives significant attention from the opposite sex, Penny is secure in their relationship, even when he leaves on a four-month expedition to the North Sea in "The Bon Voyage Reaction". After he returns, the relationship blossoms over the seventh season. In the penultimate episode "The Gorilla Dissolution", Penny admits that they should marry and when Leonard realizes that she is serious, he proposes with a ring that he has been carrying for years. Leonard and Penny decide to elope to Las Vegas in the season 8 finale, but beforehand, wanting no secrets, Leonard admits to kissing another woman, Mandy Chow (Melissa Tang) while on the expedition. Despite this, Leonard and Penny finally marry in the season 9 premiere and remain happy. By the Season 9 finale, Penny and Leonard decide to have a second wedding ceremony for their family and friends, to make up for eloping. In season 10, Sheldon moves into Penny's old apartment with Amy, allowing Penny and Leonard to finally live on their own as husband and wife.

In season 12, Penny announces that she does not want to have any children and Leonard reluctantly supports her decision. Later, her old boyfriend Zack and his new wife want Leonard to be a surrogate father to their kid since Zack is infertile. Penny reluctantly agrees to let Leonard donate his sperm. However, when she tries to seduce Leonard despite knowing he has to be abstinent for a few days, her visiting father, Wyatt, points out to Penny that her own actions suggest she is more conflicted over having kids than she lets on, and she admits she feels bad about letting him and Leonard down if she never has children. He says that despite her flaws, parenthood is the best thing that ever happened to him, and he does not want her to miss out, but that he will support her no matter what she does. Leonard eventually changes his mind, not wanting a child in the world that he cannot raise. In the series finale, Penny is pregnant with Leonard's baby, and she has changed her mind about not wanting children.

=== Sheldon and Amy's relationship ===
In the third-season finale, Raj and Howard sign Sheldon up for online dating to find a woman compatible with Sheldon, and they discover neurobiologist Amy Farrah Fowler. Like Sheldon, she has a history of social ineptitude and participates in online dating only to fulfill an agreement with her mother. This spawns a story line in which Sheldon and Amy communicate daily while insisting to Leonard and Penny that they are not romantically involved. In "The Agreement Dissection", Sheldon and Amy talk in her apartment after a night of dancing, and she kisses him on the lips. Instead of getting annoyed, Sheldon says "fascinating" and later asks Amy to be his girlfriend in "The Flaming Spittoon Acquisition". The same night he draws up "The Relationship Agreement" to verify the ground rules of him as her boyfriend and vice versa (similar to his "Roommate Agreement" with Leonard). Amy agrees but later regrets not having had a lawyer read through it.

In "The Launch Acceleration", Amy tries to use her "neurobiology bag of tricks" to increase the attraction between herself and Sheldon. Her efforts appear to be working because Sheldon is not happy, but he makes no attempt to stop her. In the fifth-season finale, "The Countdown Reflection", Sheldon takes Amy's hand as Howard is launched into space. In the sixth-season premiere, "The Date Night Variable", after a dinner in which Sheldon fails to live up to this expectation, Amy gives Sheldon an ultimatum that their relationship is over unless he tells her something from his heart. Amy accepts Sheldon's romantic speech even after learning that it is a line from the first Spider-Man movie. In "The Cooper/Kripke Inversion", Sheldon states that he has been working on his discomfort about physical contact and admits that "it's a possibility" that he could one day have sex with Amy. Amy is revealed to have similar feelings in "The Love Spell Potential". Sheldon explains that he never thought about intimacy with anyone before Amy.

"The Locomotive Manipulation" is the first episode in which Sheldon initiates a kiss with Amy. Although initially done in a fit of sarcasm, he discovers that he enjoys the feeling. Consequently, Sheldon slowly starts to open up over the rest of the season, and he starts a more intimate relationship with Amy. However, in the season finale, Sheldon leaves town temporarily to cope with several changes and Amy becomes distraught. However, 45 days into the trip, Sheldon gets mugged and calls for Leonard to drive him home, only to be confronted by Amy, who is upset over not being contacted by him in weeks. When Sheldon admits he did not call her because he was too embarrassed to admit that he could not make it on his own, Amy accepts that he is not perfect. In "The Prom Equivalency", Sheldon hides in his room to avoid going to a mock prom reenactment with her. In the resulting standoff, Amy is about to confess that she loves Sheldon, but he surprises her by saying that he loves her too. This prompts Amy to have a panic attack.

In the season-eight finale, Sheldon and Amy get into a fight about commitment on their fifth anniversary. Amy tells Sheldon that she needs to think about the future of their relationship, unaware that Sheldon was about to propose to her. Season nine sees Sheldon harassing Amy about making up her mind until she breaks up with him. Both struggle with singlehood and trying to be friends for the next few weeks until they reunite in episode ten and have sex for the first time on Amy's birthday. In season ten, Amy's apartment is flooded, and she and Sheldon decide to move in together into Penny's apartment as part of a five-week experiment to determine compatibility with each other's living habits. It goes well and they decide to make the arrangement permanent.

In the Season 11 premiere, Sheldon proposes to Amy, and she accepts. The two get married in the eleventh-season finale.

=== "Soft Kitty" ===
The song "Soft Kitty", which is sung by Sheldon, Penny, Leonard, Mary Cooper, and Amy during the series, is described by Sheldon as a song sung by his mother (Mary) when he was ill. Its repeated use in the series popularized the song. A scene showing the origin of the song in Sheldon's childhood is depicted in an episode of Young Sheldon, which aired on February 1, 2018. It shows Sheldon's mother, Mary, singing the song to her son, who has the flu.

=== Howard's mother ===
In scenes set at Howard's home, he interacts with his rarely seen mother (voiced by Carol Ann Susi until her death) by shouting from room to room in the house. She similarly interacts with other characters in this manner. She reflects the Jewish mother stereotype in some ways, such as being overly controlling of Howard's adult life and sometimes trying to make him feel guilty about causing her trouble. She is dependent on Howard, as she requires him to help her with her wig and makeup in the morning. Howard, in turn, is attached to his mother to the point where she still cuts his meat for him, takes him to the dentist, does his laundry and "grounds" him when he returns home after briefly moving out. Until Howard's marriage to Bernadette in the fifth-season finale, Howard's former living situation led Leonard's psychiatrist mother to speculate that he may suffer from some type of pathology and Sheldon to refer to their relationship as Oedipal. In season 8, Howard's mother dies in her sleep while in Florida, which devastates Howard and Stuart, who briefly lived with Mrs. Wolowitz.

=== Apartment building elevator ===
In the apartment building where Sheldon, Leonard, and Penny (and later Amy) live, the elevator has been out of order throughout most of the series, forcing characters to have to use the stairs. Stairway conversations between the characters as they walk up the three flights to their apartments occur in almost every episode, often serving as a transition between longer scenes. The Season 3 episode, "The Staircase Implementation" reveals that the elevator was broken when Leonard was experimenting with rocket fuel. In the penultimate episode of the series, the elevator is returned to an operational state, causing Sheldon some angst, until he realizes that the fixed elevator reverted things to the "status quo".

=== Vanity cards ===
Like most shows created by Chuck Lorre, The Big Bang Theory ends by showing for one second a vanity card written by Lorre after the credits, followed by the Warner Bros. Television closing logo. These cards are archived on Lorre's website. The series' final vanity card reads simply "The End".

== Release ==
=== Broadcast ===
The Big Bang Theory premiered in the United States on September 24, 2007, on CBS. The series debuted in Canada on CTV in September 2007. On February 14, 2008, the series debuted in the United Kingdom on channels E4 and Channel 4. In Australia, the first seven seasons of the series began airing on the Seven Network and 7mate from October 2015 and also gained the rights to season 8 in 2016, although the Nine Network has rights to air seasons nine & ten. On January 22, 2018, it was announced that Nine had acquired the rights to Season 1–8.

=== Syndication and streaming ===
In May 2010, it was reported that the show had been picked up for syndication, mainly among Fox's owned and operated stations and other local stations, with Warner Bros. Television's sister cable network TBS holding the show's cable syndication rights. Although details of the syndication deal have not been revealed, it was reported the deal "set a record price for a cable off-network sitcom purchase".

On September 17, 2019, as part of an extension of the TBS agreement through 2028, Warner Bros.' then-upcoming streaming service HBO Max acquired the exclusive American streaming rights to the series. In December 2024, it was announced that CBS parent company Paramount Global had acquired non-exclusive cable rights to The Big Bang Theory for Nick at Nite and MTV, beginning December 24, 2024, and January 1, 2025, respectively; Deadline Hollywood reported that the current contract with TBS had made the linear television rights non-exclusive, allowing them to be shared with other broadcasters. Beginning in 2025 The Big Bang Theory was made available on Disney+ in certain regions via the Star hub alongside its spin-off Young Sheldon in an unprecedented move.

=== Home media ===
| Name | No. of episodes | Release dates | | |
| Name | No. of episodes | Region 1 | Region 2 | Region 4 |
|---|---|---|---|---|
| The Complete First Season | 17 | September 2, 2008 | January 12, 2009 | April 3, 2009 |
| The Complete Second Season | 23 | September 15, 2009 | October 19, 2009 | March 3, 2010 |
| The Complete Third Season | 23 | September 14, 2010 | September 27, 2010 | October 13, 2010 |
| The Complete Fourth Season | 24 | September 13, 2011 | September 26, 2011 | October 5, 2011 |
| The Complete Fifth Season | 24 | September 11, 2012 | September 3, 2012 | October 3, 2012 |
| The Complete Sixth Season | 24 | September 10, 2013 | September 2, 2013 | October 11, 2013 |
| The Complete Seventh Season | 24 | September 16, 2014 | September 8, 2014 | September 17, 2014 |
| The Complete Eighth Season | 24 | September 15, 2015 | September 14, 2015 | September 16, 2015 |
| The Complete Ninth Season | 24 | September 13, 2016 | August 29, 2016 | August 31, 2016 |
| The Complete Tenth Season | 24 | September 12, 2017 | September 11, 2017 | September 13, 2017 |
| The Complete Eleventh Season | 24 | September 11, 2018 | September 24, 2018 | September 12, 2018 |
| The Twelfth and Final Season | 24 | November 12, 2019 | November 11, 2019 | November 13, 2019 |
| The Complete Series | 279 | November 12, 2019 | November 11, 2019 | November 13, 2019 |

The first and second seasons were only available on DVD at their time of release in 2008 and 2009. Starting with the release of the third season in 2010 and continuing every year with every new season, a Blu-ray disc set has also been released in conjunction with the DVD. In 2012, Warner Bros. released the first two seasons on Blu-ray, marking the first time that all episodes were available on the Blu-ray disc format.

== Reception ==
=== Critical response ===
Although the initial reception was mixed, the show went on to receive a more positive reception. The review aggregation website Rotten Tomatoes reports an 81% approval rating from critics. On Metacritic, the series holds a score of 61 out of 100, based on reviews from 27 critics, indicating generally favorable reviews. In 2013, TV Guide ranked the series #52 on its list of the 60 Best Series of All Time.

=== American ratings ===
The Big Bang Theory started off slowly in the ratings, failing to make the top 50 in its first season (ranking 68th), and ranking 40th in its second season. When the third season premiered on September 21, 2009, however, The Big Bang Theory ranked as CBS's highest-rated show of that evening in the adults 18–49 demographic (4.6/10) along with a then-series-high 12.83 million viewers. After the first three seasons aired at different times on Monday nights, CBS moved the show to Thursdays at 8:00 ET for the 2010‍–‍2011 schedule, to be in direct competition with NBC's Comedy Block and Fox's American Idol (then the longest reigning leading primetime show on American television from 2004 to 2011). During its fourth season, it became television's highest rated comedy, just barely beating out Two and a Half Men (which held the position for the past 8 years). However, in the age 18–49 demographic (the show's target age range), it was the second highest-rated comedy, behind ABC's Modern Family. The fifth season opened with viewing figures of over 14 million.

The sixth season boasts some of the highest-rated episodes for the show so far, with a then-new series high set with "The Bakersfield Expedition", with 20 million viewers, a first for the series, which along with NCIS, made CBS the first network to have two scripted series reach that large an audience in the same week since 2007. In the sixth season, the show became the highest rated and viewed scripted show in the 18–49 demographic, trailing only the live regular NBC Sunday Night Football coverage, and was third in total viewers, trailing NCIS and Sunday Night Football. Season seven of the series opened strong, continuing the success gained in season six, with the second episode of the premiere, "The Deception Verification", setting the new series high in viewers with 20.44 million.

Showrunner Steve Molaro, who took over from Bill Prady with the sixth season, credits some of the show's success to the sitcom's exposure in off-network syndication, particularly on TBS, while Michael Schneider of TV Guide attributes it to the timeslot move two seasons earlier. Chuck Lorre and CBS Entertainment president Nina Tassler also credit the success to the influence of Molaro, in particular the deepening exploration of the firmly established regular characters and their interpersonal relationships, such as the on-again, off-again relationship between Leonard and Penny. Throughout much of the 2012‍–‍13 season, The Big Bang Theory placed first in all of the syndication ratings, receiving formidable competition from only Judge Judy and Wheel of Fortune (first-run syndication programs). By the end of the 2012‍–‍13 television season, The Big Bang Theory had dethroned Judge Judy as the ratings leader in all of the syndicated programming with 7.1, Judy descending to second place for that season with a 7.0. The Big Bang Theory did not place first in syndication ratings for the 2013‍–‍14 television season, beaten out by Judge Judy.

Viewership and ratings per season of The Big Bang Theory
| Season | Timeslot (ET) | Episodes | First aired | | Last aired | | TV season | Viewership rank | Avg. viewers (millions) | 18–49 rank | Avg. 18–49 rating |
| Season | Timeslot (ET) | Episodes | Date | Viewers (millions) | Date | Viewers (millions) | TV season | Viewership rank | Avg. viewers (millions) | 18–49 rank | Avg. 18–49 rating |
|---|---|---|---|---|---|---|---|---|---|---|---|
| 1 | Monday 8:30pm (1–8); Monday 8:00pm (9–17) | 17 | September 24, 2007 | 9.52 | May 19, 2008 | 7.34 | 2007–08 | 68 | 8.31 | 46 | 3.3/8 |
| 2 | Monday 8:00 pm | 23 | September 22, 2008 | 9.32 | May 11, 2009 | 9.76 | 2008–09 | 40 | 10.03 | N/A | N/A |
| 3 | Monday 9:30 pm | 23 | September 21, 2009 | 12.96 | May 24, 2010 | 15.02 | 2009–10 | 12 | 14.22 | 5 | 5.3/13 |
| 4 | Thursday 8:00pm | 24 | September 23, 2010 | 14.04 | May 19, 2011 | 11.30 | 2010–11 | 13 | 13.21 | 7 | 4.4/13 |
| 5 | Thursday 8:00pm | 24 | September 22, 2011 | 14.30 | May 10, 2012 | 13.72 | 2011–12 | 8 | 15.82 | 6 | 5.5/17 |
| 6 | Thursday 8:00pm | 24 | September 27, 2012 | 15.66 | May 16, 2013 | 15.48 | 2012–13 | 3 | 18.68 | 2 | 6.2/19 |
| 7 | Thursday 8:00pm | 24 | September 26, 2013 | 18.99 | May 15, 2014 | 16.73 | 2013–14 | 2 | 19.96 | 2 | 6.2/20 |
| 8 | Monday 8:00pm (Note: From the eighth season onward, episodes of each season initially aired on Monday nights, before later returning to the Thursday night slot for the rest of the season. The eighth and ninth seasons returned on the seventh episode, the tenth and eleventh seasons on the sixth episode, and the twelfth season on the second episode.); Thursday 8:00pm | 24 | September 22, 2014 | 18.08 | May 7, 2015 | 14.64 | 2014–15 | 2 | 19.05 | 4 | 5.6/17 |
| 9 | Monday 8:00pm Thursday 8:00pm | 24 | September 21, 2015 | 18.20 | May 12, 2016 | 14.73 | 2015–16 | 2 | 20.36 | 3 | 5.8/19 |
| 10 | Monday 8:00pm Thursday 8:00pm | 24 | September 19, 2016 | 15.82 | May 11, 2017 | 12.99 | 2016–17 | 2 | 18.99 | 3 | 4.9/19 |
| 11 | Monday 8:00pm Thursday 8:00pm | 24 | September 25, 2017 | 17.65 | May 10, 2018 | 15.51 | 2017–18 | 1 | 18.63 | 5 | 4.4 |
| 12 | Monday 8:00pm Thursday 8:00pm | 24 | September 24, 2018 | 12.92 | May 16, 2019 | 18.52 | 2018–19 | 2 | 17.31 | 6 | 3.6 |

=== UK distribution and ratings ===
The show made its United Kingdom debut on Channel 4 on February 14, 2008. The show was also shown as a 'first-look' on Channel 4's digital offshoot E4 prior to the main channel's airing. While the show's ratings were not deemed strong enough to warrant broadcast on the main channel, they were considered the opposite for E4. For each following season, all episodes were shown first-run on E4, with episodes only aired on the main channel in a repeat capacity, usually on a weekend morning. From the third season, the show aired in two parts, being split so that it could air new episodes for longer throughout the year. This was due to rising ratings. The first part began airing on December 17, 2009, at 9:00 p.m. while the second part, containing the remaining eleven episodes, began airing in the same time period from May 6, 2010. The first half of the fourth season began airing on November 4, 2010, at 9:00 p.m., drawing 877,000 viewers, with a further 256,000 watching on the E4+1 hour service. This gave the show an overall total of 1.13 million viewers, making it E4's most-watched programme for that week. The increased ratings continued over subsequent weeks.

The fourth season's second half began on June 30, 2011. Season 5 began airing on November 3, 2011, at 8:00 p.m. as part of E4's Comedy Thursdays, acting as a lead-in to the channel's newest comedy, Perfect Couples. Episode 19, the highest-viewed episode of the season, attracted 1.4 million viewers. Season 6 premiered on November 15, 2012, with 1.89 million viewers and a further 469,000 on the time shift channel, bringing the total to 2.31 million, E4's highest viewing ratings of 2012, and the highest the channel had received since June 2011. The sixth season returned in mid-2013 to finish airing the remaining episodes. Season 7 premiered on E4 on October 31, 2013, at 8:30 pm and hit multiple ratings records this season. The second half of season seven aired in mid 2014. The eighth season premiered on E4 on October 23, 2014, at 8:30 pm. During its eighth season, The Big Bang Theory shared its 8:30 pm time period with fellow CBS comedy, 2 Broke Girls. Following the airing of the first eight episodes of that show's fourth season, The Big Bang Theory returned to finish airing its eighth season on March 19, 2015.

Netflix UK & Ireland announced on February 13, 2016, that seasons 1‍–‍8 would be available to stream from February 15, 2016.

=== Canadian ratings ===
The Big Bang Theory initially had moderate success in Canada, but gained wider popularity in later seasons. The series is broadcast on the CTV Television Network, often through simultaneous substitution with cross-border CBS affiliates. It also aired in daily reruns on the Canadian cable channel The Comedy Network.

The season 4 premiere garnered an estimated 3.1 million viewers across Canada. This was the largest audience for a sitcom since the series finale of Friends. The show later increased in viewership and became the most-watched entertainment television show in Canada.

=== Accolades ===
In August 2009, the sitcom won the best comedy series TCA award and Jim Parsons (Sheldon) won the award for individual achievement in comedy. In 2010, the show won the People's Choice Award for Favorite Comedy, while Parsons won a Primetime Emmy Award for Outstanding Lead Actor in a Comedy Series. On January 16, 2011, Parsons was awarded a Golden Globe for Best Performance by an Actor in a Television Series – Comedy or Musical, an award that was presented by co-star Kaley Cuoco. On September 18, 2011, Parsons was again awarded an Emmy for Best Actor in a Comedy Series. On January 9, 2013, the show won People's Choice Award for Favorite Comedy for the second time. August 25, 2014, Jim Parsons was awarded an Emmy for Best Actor in a Comedy Series. The Big Bang Theory also won the 2016 People's Choice Awards for under Favorite TV Show and Favorite Network TV Comedy with Jim Parsons winning Favorite Comedic TV Actor. On January 20, 2016, The Big Bang Theory also won the International category at the UK's National Television Awards.

== Merchandise ==
On March 16, 2014, a Lego Ideas project portraying the living room scene in Lego style with the main cast as mini-figures reached 10,000 supporters on the platform, which qualified it to be considered as an official set by the Lego Ideas review board. On November 7, 2014, Lego Ideas approved the design and began refining it. The set was released in August 2015, with an exclusive pre-sale taking place at San Diego Comic-Con.

== Franchise ==
Four television series make up The Big Bang Theory franchise: The Big Bang Theory, Young Sheldon, Georgie & Mandy's First Marriage, and Stuart Fails to Save the Universe. All series in total amount to 481 episodes across 23 seasons of television.

| Series | Seasons | Episodes | Originally released | Network |
|---|---|---|---|---|
| The Big Bang Theory | 12 | 279 | September 24, 2007 – May 16, 2019 | CBS |
| Young Sheldon | 7 | 141 | September 25, 2017 – May 16, 2024 | CBS |
| Georgie & Mandy's First Marriage | 3 | 51 | October 17, 2024 – present | CBS |
| Stuart Fails to Save the Universe | 1 | 10 | July 23, 2026 – present | HBO Max |

=== Young Sheldon ===
In November 2016, it was reported that CBS was in negotiations to create a spin-off of The Big Bang Theory centered on Sheldon as a young boy. The prequel series, described as "a Malcolm in the Middle-esque single-camera family comedy" would be executive-produced by Lorre and Molaro, with Prady expected to be involved in some capacity, and intended to air in the 2017‍–‍18 season alongside The Big Bang Theory. The initial idea for the series came from Parsons, who passed it along to The Big Bang Theory producers. In early March 2017, Iain Armitage was cast as the younger Sheldon, as well as Zoe Perry as his mother, Mary Cooper. Perry is the real-life daughter of Laurie Metcalf, who portrays Mary Cooper on The Big Bang Theory.

On March 13, 2017, CBS ordered the spin-off Young Sheldon series. Jon Favreau directed and executive produced the pilot. Created by Lorre and Molaro, the series follows 9-year-old Sheldon Cooper as he attends high school in East Texas. Alongside Armitage as 9-year-old Sheldon Cooper and Perry as Mary Cooper, Lance Barber stars as George Cooper, Sheldon's father; Raegan Revord stars as Missy Cooper, Sheldon's twin sister; and Montana Jordan stars as George Cooper Jr., Sheldon's older brother. Jim Parsons reprises his role as the adult Sheldon Cooper, who serves as the narrator for the series. Parsons, Lorre, Molaro and Todd Spiewak also serve as executive producers on the series, for Chuck Lorre Productions and Warner Bros. Television. The show's pilot episode premiered on September 25, 2017. Subsequent weekly episodes began airing on November 2, 2017, following the broadcast of the 237th episode of The Big Bang Theory.

On January 6, 2018, the show was renewed for a second season. On February 22, 2019, CBS renewed the series for both the third and fourth seasons. On March 30, 2021, CBS renewed the series for a fifth, sixth, and seventh season.

Armitage appeared on the series' 265th episode, "The VCR Illumination", by way of a videotape recorded by the younger Sheldon and viewed by the current-day Sheldon. The prequel series came to an end on May 16, 2024, with an hour-long episode which included George Cooper's funeral and a cameo from Parsons and Mayim Bialik as their older characters. The audience learns that Young Sheldon has been a memoir of Sheldon's life all along.

=== Georgie & Mandy's First Marriage ===
In January 2024, it was announced that there would be a spin-off series of Young Sheldon focused on Georgie Cooper and Mandy McAllister. The series premiered on CBS on October 17, 2024. In January 2026, CBS renewed the series for a third season.

=== Stuart Fails to Save the Universe ===
On April 12, 2023, it was announced that a spin-off of the original series was in development. On October 10, 2024, it was announced that the third spin-off would feature Stuart Bloom, Denise, and Bert Kibbler, with Kevin Sussman, Lauren Lapkus, and Brian Posehn reprising their roles. In the premise of the series, Stuart is "tasked with restoring reality after he breaks a device built by Sheldon and Leonard, accidentally bringing about a multiverse Armageddon." The series premiered on HBO Max on July 23, 2026. In August 2026, the series was renewed for a second season.

== Offshoots ==
=== Plagiarized series ===
Through the use of his vanity cards at the end of episodes, Lorre alleged that the program had been plagiarized by a show produced and aired in Belarus in 2010. Officially titled Теоретики (The Theorists), the show features "clones" of the main characters, a similar opening sequence, and what appears to be a very close Russian translation of the scripts. Lorre expressed annoyance and described his inquiry with the Warner Bros. legal department about options. The television production company and station's close relationship with the Belarus government was cited as the reason that any attempt to claim copyright infringement would be in vain because the company copying the episodes is operated by the government.

However, no legal action was required to end production of the other show: as soon as it became known that the show was unlicensed, the actors quit and the producers canceled it. Dmitriy Tankovich (who plays Leonard's counterpart, "Seva") said in an interview,

I'm upset. At first, the actors were told all legal issues were resolved. We didn't know it wasn't the case, so when the creators of The Big Bang Theory started talking about the show, I was embarrassed. I can't understand why our people first do, and then think. I consider this to be the rock bottom of my career. And I don't want to take part in a stolen show.

=== Television special ===
On May 16, 2019, a television special titled Unraveling the Mystery: A Big Bang Farewell aired following the series finale of The Big Bang Theory. It is a backstage retrospective featuring Johnny Galecki and Kaley Cuoco.
