= Raegan Revord =

American actor (born 2008)

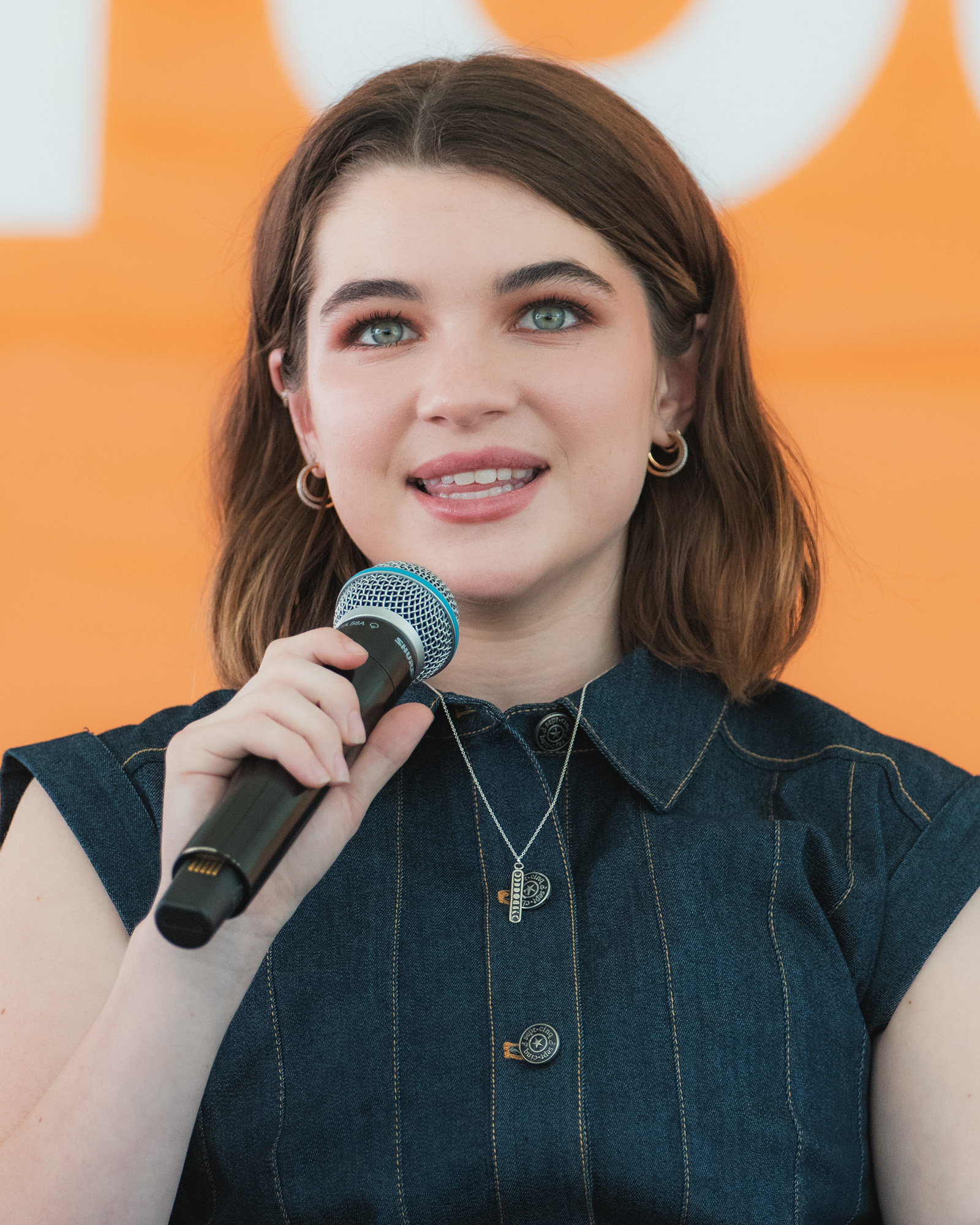
- Revord in 2026
- Born: January 3, 2008 (age 18); San Diego, California, U.S.
- Occupations: Actor; model; novelist
- Years active: 2012–present
- Known for: Young Sheldon

Raegan Revord (born January 3, 2008) is an American actor and novelist known for their (Note: Revord is non-binary and uses they/them pronouns.) role as Missy Cooper in the television sitcom Young Sheldon. Their novel Rules for Fake Girlfriends was published in 2025.

== Early life ==
Raegan Revord was born on January 3, 2008, in San Diego, California, and was raised in Los Angeles, where their family moved when they were three and a half years old. They are an only child.

== Career ==
=== Acting ===
Revord began modeling work for print advertisements and appeared in commercials at age four. They were cast as Megan in Modern Family at six. They had minor roles in Grace and Frankie, With Bob & David, and Teachers. They did voice work for the radio play Nilsa and the Troll.

In March 2017, Revord was cast as Missy Cooper, Sheldon Cooper's twin sister, in the sitcom Young Sheldon, a prequel to The Big Bang Theory. Revord felt that the character's slight use on The Big Bang Theory (2007–2019) left plenty of room for an original interpretation. Missy Cooper has been described as adding a "much-needed spunk to the plot but also serv[ing] as the perfect foil to her academically-gifted twin brother, Sheldon". Screen Rant said in 2024, "For the longest time, Missy was Young Sheldon's best character, even though she was mostly sidelined." Revord picked up Missy's Texan accent by watching Laurie Metcalf play an older version of the character's mother on The Big Bang Theory.

They have a recurring role as Missy in the Young Sheldon sequel series Georgie & Mandy's First Marriage, and appeared in the final episode of the sitcom Night Court.

=== Book club and writing ===
In 2019, Revord created Read with Raegan, an online book club for young readers which, as of 2025, had 175,000 followers on Instagram. They wrote Rules for Fake Girlfriends, a young adult sapphic romance novel published by Wednesday Books in September 2025. Revord worked on the book, set on a college campus in England, between takes during the last season of Young Sheldon, and credited Heartstopper and its TV adaptation as inspiration. They have also narrated an audio-book version. Kirkus Reviews gave the book a negative review, while Publishers Weekly was more mixed.

As of 2025, Revord is working on their second book, a fantasy they started writing before Rules for Fake Girlfriends.

=== Charity work ===
As of 2025, Revord is a junior ambassador for Children's Hospital Los Angeles.

== Personal life ==
Revord suffered from polyendocrine metabolic ovarian syndrome (PMOS), a hormonal disorder, during Young Sheldon, which affected their weight and led to mental health problems.

They came out as non-binary in 2025, and said that they are gay in an interview released in October 2026.

In September 2025, Revord revealed that for approximately the past two years, they had been streaming under the alias SettingSunset, playing a number of video games including Minecraft. As of 2025, they have five pets: four dogs and a cat.

== Filmography ==
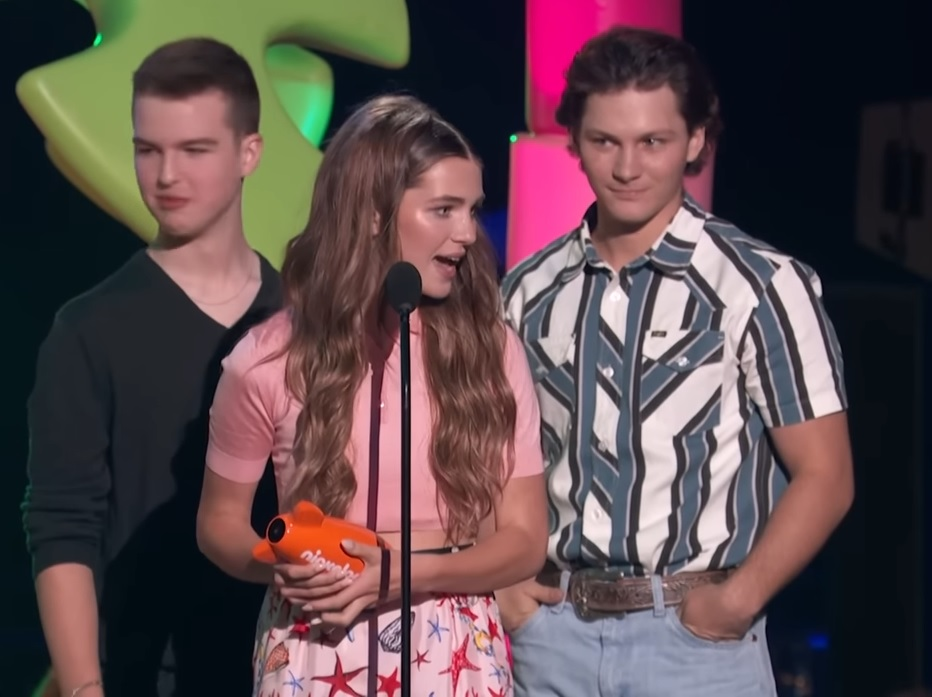
The Cooper siblings cast from Young Sheldon in 2024

=== Film ===
Year	Title	Role	Notes	Ref
2015	Tortoise	Ballerina	Short film	
2017	I See You	Amy	Short film	
2017	Stray	Zoe Ackert	Short film	
2017	Wish Upon	Young Clare	—N/a	

=== Television ===
Year	Title	Role	Notes	Ref
2014, 2016	Modern Family	Megan	2 episodes	
2015	W/ Bob & David	Greg's daughter	Season 1 episode 3	
2016	Grace and Frankie	Little girl	Episode "The Vitamix"	
2017	Teachers	Melinda	Episode "School Sweet School"	
2017–2024	Young Sheldon	Missy Cooper	Main cast	
2019	Alexa & Katie	Ainsley	Episode "Always Something There to Remind Me"	
2022	The Price Is Right at Night	Themself (Note: Revord and Iain Armitage appear as special guests, not contestants.)	September 30, 2022	
2024–present	Georgie & Mandy's First Marriage	Missy Cooper	Recurring role	
2025	Night Court	Shelby ("Sylvia Plath")	Episode: "A Decent Proposal"	

== Awards ==
Year	Association	Category	Work	Result	Ref.
2018	Young Artist Award	Best Performance in a TV Series – Supporting Young Actress	Missy Cooper in Young Sheldon	Nominated	
2023	Family Film Award	Outstanding Young Actor	—N/a	Won	
