= The Conjugal Conjecture =

- The Big Bang Theory episode
- Leonard and Penny, with her parents and brother
- Episode no.: Season 10; Episode 1
- Directed by: Mark Cendrowski
- Story by: Chuck Lorre; Steve Holland; Tara Hernandez
- Teleplay by: Steven Molaro; Eric Kaplan; Jim Reynolds
- Production code: T12.15303
- Original air date: September 19, 2016

Guest appearances
- Katey Sagal as Penny's mother; Keith Carradine as Wyatt; Jack McBrayer as Penny's brother; Judd Hirsch as Alfred; Laurie Metcalf as Mary Cooper; Christine Baranski as Dr. Beverly Hofstadter; Dean Norris as Air Force representative Colonel Williams

Episode chronology
← Previous "The Convergence Convergence"	Next → "The Military Miniaturization"
- The Big Bang Theory season 10

"The Conjugal Conjecture" is the first episode of the tenth season, and 208th episode overall of The Big Bang Theory. It first aired on CBS on September 19, 2016.

== Plot ==
The gang prepares for Leonard and Penny's second wedding ceremony. Sheldon and Leonard fear that Mary slept with Alfred the previous night, though they swear nothing happened. They do, however, plan to visit each other, irritating Beverly. Penny's family arrives. Her mother worries that her son's recent jail stint will cause Leonard's family to think of them as white trash. The ceremony goes well, with Leonard and Penny declaring their love for each other, Beverly and Alfred grateful they at least made Leonard together during their relationship, and Sheldon declaring his love for the couple. Howard is contacted by Colonel Richard Williams of the Air Force Research Laboratory, who scares both him and Raj. Howard eventually agrees to meet him, but the colonel refuses to give the reason for his interest.

== Reception ==
=== Ratings ===
The episode was watched live by 15.82 million viewers, and had a ratings share of 3.8/13, during its original broadcast.

The episode attracted 1,636,000 viewers upon its British premiere, making it the most watched programme on E4 for the week.

=== Critical response ===
Jesse Schedeen of IGN rated the episode 7.3, complimenting the family drama but criticized the large number of characters.

Caroline Preece of Den of Geek complimented the casting of Katey Sagal as Penny's mother and Amy's harp performance. However, Preece criticized the repetition of this episode compared to the premiere of the last season, robbing "Leonard and Penny's wedding of much of its emotion".
