= The Matrimonial Momentum =

- The Big Bang Theory episode
- Episode no.: Season 9 Episode 1
- Directed by: Mark Cendrowski
- Story by: Chuck Lorre; Jim Reynolds; Maria Ferrari
- Teleplay by: Steven Molaro; Steve Holland; Eric Kaplan
- Production code: 4X7201
- Original air date: September 21, 2015

Guest appearances
- Louise Claps as the receptionist (voice only); Jim Meskimen as the minister; Laurie Metcalf as Mary Cooper

Episode chronology
← Previous "The Commitment Determination"	Next → "The Separation Oscillation"
- The Big Bang Theory season 9

"The Matrimonial Momentum" is the first episode of the ninth season, and 184th episode overall of The Big Bang Theory. It first aired on CBS on September 21, 2015.

== Plot ==
Leonard and Penny elope in Las Vegas, live streaming the ceremony for friends at home. Leonard wrote a touching cosmology-based wedding vow while Penny recites "You've Got a Friend in Me" from Leonard's favorite movie, Toy Story. Sheldon, confused and hurt by Amy's indecision about their relationship, insults her before all their friends while watching the wedding stream at Howard and Bernadette's house. Amy openly breaks up with him, upon which all leave except for Howard and Stuart, who actually see the wedding to the end. When Leonard and Penny kiss after he carries her over the threshold, Penny is still bothered that Leonard kissed Mandy two years ago and is outraged to hear they work together. They argue on their return home and both go to their respective apartments alone. Sheldon calls his mother to return his great-grandmother's ring which he had intended for Amy, but Mary tells him to wait. He also briefly considers dating Mandy to hurt Amy and is outraged to learn that Penny knew she was unhappy and did not defend him.

== Reception ==
=== Ratings ===
The episode was watched live by 18.20 million viewers, and had a ratings share of 4.7, during its original broadcast.

The episode attracted 2,661,000 viewers upon its British premiere, making it the most watched programme on E4 for the week.

=== Critical response ===
In 2019, Screen Rant rated it the worst episode of the series.

Jesse Schedeen of IGN rated the episode 8.2, complimenting how the episode set-up ongoing drama, as well as Amy and Sheldon's break-up. Schedeen criticized the episode's lack of humour.

Caroline Preece of Den of Geek similarly criticizes that the episode is "devoid of any laughs at all" and ends on "a sour note". Preece commented that Sheldon is "unrepentantly awful" and described the wedding as "cute" and a "brave choice" by the writers, but questioned after their breakup: "what was the point?"
