= The Locomotion Interruption =

- The Big Bang Theory episode
- Episode no.: Season 8 Episode 1
- Directed by: Mark Cendrowski
- Story by: Jim Reynolds, Maria Ferrari and Tara Hernandez
- Teleplay by: Steven Molaro, Steve Holland and Eric Kaplan
- Production code: 4X6751
- Original air date: September 22, 2014

Guest appearance
- Carol Ann Susi as Debbie Wolowitz

Episode chronology
← Previous "The Status Quo Combustion"	Next → "The Junior Professor Solution"
- The Big Bang Theory season 8

"The Locomotion Interruption" is the first episode of the eighth season of The Big Bang Theory, which first aired on CBS on September 22, 2014. It is the 160th episode overall. In "The Locomotion Interruption", Sheldon returns to Pasadena, Penny has a job interview for a pharmaceutical sales position, and Stuart living with Howard's mother begins to make Howard uncomfortable.

== Plot ==
Forty-five days after leaving Pasadena, Sheldon finds himself in a train station in Kingman, Arizona with all of his possessions (and his pants) stolen. He calls Leonard to pick him up, and Leonard takes Amy with him. Heading home, Sheldon says that he never left any of the train stations during his journey. Amy is hurt he left without telling her, and that he called Leonard, not her, for help. Sheldon is not happy that she is there, and says he did not call her because he was too embarrassed to admit that he could not make it on his own; Amy accepts that he is not perfect. Sheldon thinks his trip was worthwhile because it has left him ready to deal with change, but as soon as he sees Penny's new haircut he immediately walks out of the apartment. Bernadette gets Penny a job interview with her pharmaceutical company as a salesperson, though Penny is very nervous about it. She does horribly in the interview, but gets the job anyway, after bonding with the interviewer over their shared fear of Bernadette. Howard and Raj find Stuart still living with Howard's mother even though she has recovered, which is very unsettling to Howard.

== Production ==
The filming of "The Locomotion Interruption" was originally supposed to begin on July 31, 2014, but it was delayed due to contract negotiations; deals were settled with the main cast on August 4 and August 5, and the first table read took place on August 6.

This episode was the first following The Big Bang Theory's temporary change in timeslot to Monday nights due to CBS acquiring the rights to the first six Thursday Night Football games. This episode and "The Junior Professor Solution" aired consecutively on September 22, 2014.

== Critical reception ==
Schedeen of IGN gave the episode a rating of 6.7 out of 10. Schedeen said the episode "wasn't a great start", describing it as "pretty textbook Big Bang Theory" and criticizing Sheldon's plot, though Schedeen considered Raj and Howard's storyline to be "pretty entertaining". Sava, writing in The A.V. Club, called the show "a relic of a former age", described Sheldon as "one of this show's most problematic elements" and gave the episode a C− rating. In TV Fanatic, Day gave the episode a negative review, calling it "an utter disappointment"; Day strongly disliked Sheldon's storyline, "was most interested" in Penny's plot and "had mixed feelings" about Howard's storyline. Runcie, in The Telegraph, said the episode was "heavy on intense discussion" and "not always comedy-rich", giving it two out of five stars.
