= The Big Bang Theory season 9 =

The Big Bang Theory
- Season 9
- DVD cover art
- Showrunner: Steven Molaro
- Starring: Johnny Galecki; Jim Parsons; Kaley Cuoco; Simon Helberg; Kunal Nayyar; Mayim Bialik; Melissa Rauch; Kevin Sussman; Laura Spencer
- No. of episodes: 24

Release
- Original network: CBS
- Original release: September 21, 2015 – May 12, 2016

Season chronology
- ← Previous; Season 8 Next → Season 10

The ninth season of the American television sitcom The Big Bang Theory aired on CBS from September 21, 2015 to May 12, 2016.

The series returned to its regular Thursday night time slot on November 5, 2015 after Thursday Night Football on CBS ended.

Laura Spencer was promoted to the main cast during this season after being a recurring cast member for two seasons.

== Production ==
In March 2014, the series was renewed for an eighth, ninth and tenth season through the 2016–17 television season.

Like the previous season, the first six episodes of the ninth season aired on a different night due to CBS acquiring the rights to Thursday Night Football games. In May 2015, CBS announced at its annual upfront presentation, that the series would begin its ninth season on Mondays, before returning to the Thursday slot once the football games ended.

Filming for the ninth season began on August 5, 2015, according to posts on Twitter by several of the cast members including Melissa Rauch and Kunal Nayyar.

Laurie Metcalf reprised her role as Sheldon's mother Mary in the first and twenty-fourth episodes, and Keith Carradine returned as Penny's father Wyatt in the third episode.

Sheldon's maternal grandmother Constance, whom he calls "Meemaw", made her first long-awaited appearance in the fourteenth episode and was portrayed by June Squibb and Leonard's father Alfred also made his first long-awaited appearance in the twenty-fourth episode and was played by Judd Hirsch.

This was the first season to feature every main cast member of the show, including former main cast member Sara Gilbert, who made a guest appearance in the 200th episode.

== Cast ==
=== Main cast ===
- Johnny Galecki as Dr. Leonard Hofstadter
- Jim Parsons as Dr. Sheldon Cooper
- Kaley Cuoco as Penny
- Simon Helberg as Howard Wolowitz
- Kunal Nayyar as Dr. Rajesh "Raj" Koothrappali
- Mayim Bialik as Dr. Amy Farrah Fowler
- Melissa Rauch as Dr. Bernadette Rostenkowski-Wolowitz
- Kevin Sussman as Stuart David Bloom
- Laura Spencer as Dr. Emily Sweeney

=== Recurring cast ===
- Laurie Metcalf as Mary Cooper
- John Ross Bowie as Dr. Barry Kripke
- Wil Wheaton as himself
- Casey Sander as Mike Rostenkowski
- Alessandra Torresani as Claire
- Christine Baranski as Dr. Beverly Hofstadter
- Brian Thomas Smith as Zach Johnson
- Sara Gilbert as Leslie Winkle
- Bob Newhart as Dr. Arthur Jeffries/Professor Proton
- Stephen Hawking as himself

=== Guest cast ===
- Jim Meskimen as a Minister
- Melissa Tang as Mandy Chao
- Keith Carradine as Wyatt (Penny's dad)
- Megan Heyn as Natalie
- Patrika Darbo as Grace
- Michael Rapaport as Kenny
- Adam Nimoy as himself
- Stephen Merchant as Dave Gibbs
- Lio Tipton (Note: Credited as Analeigh Tipton; Tipton came out as non-binary and changed their name in 2021.) as Vanessa Bennett
- Elon Musk as himself
- Wayne Wilderson as Travis
- Jane Kaczmarek as Dr. Gallo
- June Squibb as Meemaw
- Creagen Dow as Maitre D'
- Adam West as himself
- Blake Anderson as Trevor
- Judd Hirsch as Alfred Hofstadter
- Stan Lee as himself
- Amanda Payton as Ainsley

== Episodes ==
No. overall	No. in season	Title	Directed by	Written by	Original release date	Prod. code	U.S. viewers (millions)
184	1	"The Matrimonial Momentum"	Mark Cendrowski	Story by : Chuck Lorre & Jim Reynolds & Maria Ferrari; Teleplay by : Steven Molaro & Steve Holland & Eric Kaplan	September 21, 2015	4X7201	18.20
Leonard and Penny elope in Las Vegas, live streaming the ceremony for friends at home. Leonard wrote a touching cosmology-based wedding vow while Penny recites "You've Got a Friend in Me" from Leonard's favorite movie, Toy Story. Sheldon, confused and hurt by Amy's indecision about their relationship, insults her before all their friends while watching the wedding stream at Howard and Bernadette's house. Amy openly breaks up with him, upon which all leave except for Howard and Stuart, who actually see the wedding to the end. When Leonard and Penny kiss after he carries her over the threshold, Penny is still bothered that Leonard kissed Mandy two years ago and is outraged to hear they work together. They argue on their return home and both go to their respective apartments alone. Sheldon calls his mother to return his great-grandmother's ring which he had intended for Amy, but Mary tells him to wait. He also briefly considers dating Mandy to hurt Amy and is outraged to learn that Penny knew she was unhappy and did not defend him.
185	2	"The Separation Oscillation"	Mark Cendrowski	Story by : Steven Molaro & Steve Holland & Tara Hernandez; Teleplay by : Chuck Lorre & Jim Reynolds & Maria Ferrari	September 28, 2015	4X7202	15.23
Following their breakup, Sheldon returns Amy's belongings, failing to make her jealous by "accidentally" putting one of Penny's bras in the box. He records a "Fun With Flags" episode alone, angrily using countries that separated as metaphors for Amy dumping him. Amy, furious, demands he remove the video, for Sheldon a sign she still wants him. After having a nightmare of Sheldon and Penny passionately kissing, Leonard considers marriage counseling but finds it too expensive. Howard and Bernadette have long known of Leonard and Mandy's kiss. Howard kept it from Raj, as did Bernadette from Penny. Bernadette points out to Penny that the now confident Leonard is with her because he loves her, not out of desperation. During a chat with Mandy Chow, who is not attracted to Leonard and neither remembers nor cares that she kissed him, he realizes part of himself may be trying to sabotage his marriage as he thinks he is not good enough for Penny. Penny also admits overreacting and fearing he will leave her for someone smarter. Both agree to abandon their fears and embrace their happiness. Sheldon surprises them with a trip to San Francisco, only to say he will join them as well; having originally bought the tickets for him and Amy. In the end, Leonard and Penny get back together while Sheldon and Amy grow further apart.
186	3	"The Bachelor Party Corrosion"	Mark Cendrowski	Story by : Dave Goetsch & Jim Reynolds & Jeremy Howe; Teleplay by : Steven Molaro & Steve Holland & Eric Kaplan	October 5, 2015	4X7203	15.40
Raj and Howard plan to kidnap Leonard for a belated bachelor party weekend and forcefully take Sheldon, who is impressed that the van they are driving once belonged to physicist Richard Feynman and that they plan to stay at his vacation house in Mexico. When the van has a flat tire, a stuck lug nut prevents the men from fixing it. Several scientific methods all fail to remove it, but ultimately they inadvertently set the van on fire. Meanwhile, the women have a small bachelorette party at Penny's apartment. Amy reveals she has not told her family about her breakup with Sheldon, relating how her mother had her sit in a "sin closet". Penny pierces Amy's ears for her, and mentions she has not told her family she married Leonard. She reluctantly calls her father, Wyatt, who is happy for her though he upsets Penny after confessing he accidentally killed her pet pig a year ago. The women have Amy call her mother, but when Amy finds it difficult to tell her about the breakup, Penny tells her about Amy's breakup, her penis cookies, and her pierced ears. Then Amy's mother has her sit in Penny's closet.
187	4	"The 2003 Approximation"	Mark Cendrowski	Story by : Chuck Lorre & Steve Holland & Eric Kaplan; Teleplay by : Steven Molaro & Maria Ferrari & Tara Hernandez	October 12, 2015	4X7204	14.96
Leonard and Penny finally tell Sheldon they have moved in together now that they are married. Sheldon is upset, but Bernadette says he should try to find another roommate, though Stuart firmly rejects her idea that he move in with Sheldon. Sheldon rejects everyone he meets and Amy refuses to live with him, as they have just broken up. Sheldon tries to pretend that it is 2003, before he met Leonard, Penny and Amy, and before he developed emotional connections to other people, fearing that Leonard and Penny, too, will eventually abandon him. For his sake, Leonard and Penny agree to split their time between apartments to be with Sheldon who begins to modify The Roommate Agreement for this purpose. Meanwhile, Stuart wants a band to play music in his comic book store for free. Raj and Howard write a filk song about Thor fighting Indiana Jones, though Emily suggests it would be better if people could dance to the music. Raj and Howard momentarily break up the band but quickly make up, playing the song at the store only to have Stuart say they should play music people could dance to.
188	5	"The Perspiration Implementation"	Mark Cendrowski	Story by : Chuck Lorre & Eric Kaplan & Maria Ferrari; Teleplay by : Steven Molaro & Jim Reynolds & Saladin K. Patterson	October 19, 2015	4X7205	14.68
Howard builds a machine that repeatedly spins to add mileage to the Fitbit Bernadette bought for him to track his exercise. (Later in the episode Bernadette checks her iPad and it shows Howard has run hundreds of miles, Bernadette busting Howard for trying to get away without exercising using his Fitbit, Howard leaving his machine on repeatedly adding miles to the Fitbit, forgetting to turn the machine off while at work). Leonard, however, decides that the group should become more physically active and they take up the sport of fencing, attending a class taught by Barry Kripke. After learning that Amy is single, Kripke wants to ask her out, which upsets Sheldon. Howard, Raj, Leonard, and Sheldon go to a sports bar and encourage Sheldon to move on. Sheldon randomly asks two women out and is rejected. Stuart asks Penny, Bernadette, and Amy for advice on how to attract more female customers to his comic book store and they conclude that his creepy behavior is the problem. Amy sympathizes with him for being lonely, but turns him down when he hits on her. She also rejects Kripke after he sends her a photograph of him nude. When Leonard and Sheldon return home from the bar, they run into Amy and Bernadette in the stairwell, leading to a chat between Sheldon and Amy, who awkwardly exchange anecdotes on their attempts to move on.
189	6	"The Helium Insufficiency"	Mark Cendrowski	Story by : Steve Holland & Maria Ferrari & Anthony Del Broccolo; Teleplay by : Steven Molaro & Eric Kaplan & Jim Reynolds	October 26, 2015	4X7207	16.32
Swedish physicists are about to prove Sheldon and Leonard's super-fluid hypothesis about the universe and the men need liquid helium to conduct their experiment first. Kripke refuses to let them use any of the university's helium. Howard connects them to Kenny, a black market dealer, though Sheldon's mistrust of him almost ends the deal. At the lab, Leonard and Sheldon realise it may be stolen from the U.S. government and panic about using stolen government property, and pay Kenny to take it back. Kripke offers to give them some of his helium if they share scientific credit with him. Instead, they pay Kenny for helium a third time and watch Ernest Goes to Jail with him because he gets along with them. Meanwhile, Stuart tells the rest of the group he has been on two dates thanks to an app on his phone. They download it on Amy's phone much to her discomfort and make fun of the suggested men. To their surprise, a man named Dave texts Amy his thanks for the date they had last night. Amy reveals she has been on three coffee dates with men to move on from Sheldon.
190	7	"The Spock Resonance"	Nikki Lorre	Story by : Chuck Lorre & Jim Reynolds & Tara Hernandez; Teleplay by : Steven Molaro & Steve Holland & Jeremy Howe	November 5, 2015	4X7206	14.81
Wil Wheaton arranges for Sheldon to be interviewed for a documentary about Spock, For the Love of Spock and Leonard Nimoy by his son Adam. Sheldon explains he admired the character of Spock from childhood for being logical and unemotional and tried to imitate him. He brings up the autographed napkin from Nimoy that he keeps with his valuables, including an engagement ring (a family heirloom) for Amy. His planned proposal to Amy shocks Leonard and Penny who push Sheldon to admit he is feeling hurt. Sheldon decides to propose to Amy for closure, but sees her kiss another man, Dave, goodbye outside her apartment building, and leaves dejected. Meanwhile, Bernadette wants to start renovating the house, but Howard protests against changing his childhood home. Calling in her father Mike, he asks why Howard does not want children. Howard reveals Bernadette to be the one resisting parenthood. Raj theorizes she fears it because Howard acts so childish. Howard says he always dreamed of being a responsible father to make up for his own abandonment in childhood. Bernadette promises to think about it.
191	8	"The Mystery Date Observation"	Mark Cendrowski	Story by : Steven Molaro & Eric Kaplan & Jim Reynolds; Teleplay by : Chuck Lorre & Steve Holland & Tara Hernandez	November 12, 2015	4X7208	14.92
Amy has another date with Dave, so Bernadette and Penny decide to spy on her, dragging Leonard along. During the date, Dave reveals he is a huge fan of Sheldon's scientific work. He asks her about Sheldon the entire time, greatly annoying her. As they leave, Bernadette panics and hits Dave's car. Initially outraged about the accident, Dave meets Leonard and is instantly starstruck. Amy ends it with Dave, who is happy to have kissed and been rejected by the same woman as Dr. Sheldon Cooper. Meanwhile, Sheldon struggles to move on without Amy, so he asks Howard and Raj to set him up with another woman since they introduced him to Amy. They post an ad on Craigslist that is filled with scientific and science-fiction brain teasers to solve for Sheldon's contact information that night. Fifteen seconds after the deadline, an attractive woman named Vanessa shows up, sharing many of Sheldon's interests including physics, flags, and obscure languages. He does like her, but shuts the door on her for exceeding the time limit.
192	9	"The Platonic Permutation"	Mark Cendrowski	Story by : Jim Reynolds & Jeremy Howe & Tara Hernandez; Teleplay by : Steve Holland & Maria Ferrari & Adam Faberman	November 19, 2015	4X7209	15.19
With Sheldon and Amy still broken up and all of his friends busy for Thanksgiving, Sheldon tries to give Amy tickets he bought them to Thanksgiving dinner at the aquarium, but Amy suggests they can still go as friends. Despite initial awkwardness, Amy honestly answers Sheldon's questions about her dating life, and each wants the other to be happy, falling back into their old friendship. Later, Amy tells Sheldon she is ready to be his girlfriend again. Sheldon declines, since getting over her was too difficult, but wishes to remain friends. Amy hides her hurt feelings. Bernadette, Raj, and Emily drag Howard to a soup kitchen to volunteer for the day after Howard lies about going there to avoid Sheldon. At the soup kitchen, Howard hates washing dishes, but is delighted to meet Elon Musk, the founder of SpaceX. They bond over space travel. Meanwhile, Leonard and Penny prepare Thanksgiving dinner at home for the gang. When he realizes she does not know his birthday, he proceeds to list personal things he knows about her, but accidentally reveals knowing she hates the orange lingerie he bought her, which she only disclosed in her journal. To apologize for reading it without permission, Leonard dances in the lingerie, asking Penny to post an image on her social media as punishment. Penny refuses, but Howard, Raj, Bernadette, and Emily barge into the scene in his apartment.
193	10	"The Earworm Reverberation"	Mark Cendrowski	Story by : Eric Kaplan & Jim Reynolds & Saladin K. Patterson; Teleplay by : Steven Molaro & Steve Holland & Jeremy Howe	December 10, 2015	4X7210	15.27
Sheldon is humming the melody to a song he does not know the name of, which is especially unusual since he has an eidetic memory. He spends two days obsessing over the tune and recording a log while he is still mentally sound, fearing he might be turning into a mad genius, thus annoying Leonard and Penny. Meanwhile, after getting rejected by Sheldon, Amy tries to move on and arranges another date with Dave, who struggles to contain his excitement about Sheldon. Sheldon finally realizes the song is "Darlin'" by the Beach Boys (the notes corresponding to the introduction), that the lyrics relate to how Amy made him a better man, and rushes to her apartment, interrupting her date with Dave. Dave helps Amy realise that Sheldon loves her and they get back together. Meanwhile, Howard and Raj's fan page for their filk band is liked by a person named Trent. They stalk Trent online and think he is very cool, deciding to go meet him in a café. However, they see him pick his nose and eat his own booger, causing them to run out.
194	11	"The Opening Night Excitation"	Mark Cendrowski	Story by : Steven Molaro & Eric Kaplan & Tara Hernandez; Teleplay by : Steve Holland & Jim Reynolds & Maria Ferrari	December 17, 2015	4X7211	17.23
After an iconic Star Wars-like opening credit crawl, the men are overjoyed to get opening night tickets to the Star Wars: The Force Awakens movie, which premieres on Amy's birthday. As Sheldon bought his ticket when he and Amy were broken up, he still wants to see it, despite Penny saying he should be with Amy. Sheldon has a dream/visitation where Arthur Jeffries' ghost talks with him while dressed as a Jedi master, and convinces him Amy is more important, leading him to tell Amy he will spend the day with her as well as give up his Star Wars ticket to the rest of the men. Talking over birthday gift ideas with Penny and Bernadette, he shocks them by saying he is going to have coitus with Amy to show her how much she means to him. On Amy's birthday, Sheldon and Amy are nervous about having sex, but enjoy the experience more than they expected. Sheldon wants to do it again on her next birthday, which is fine with Amy. Meanwhile, the rest of the men go to the movie with Wil Wheaton, who arrives dressed as Spock in a Star Trek uniform to spite the viewers. After the movie, the men lie back in the afterglow, much like Sheldon and Amy did.
195	12	"The Sales Call Sublimation"	Mark Cendrowski	Story by : Steve Holland & Jim Reynolds & Saladin K. Patterson; Teleplay by : Steven Molaro & Maria Ferrari & Anthony Del Broccolo	January 7, 2016	4X7212	15.85
Penny cannot find a way to make a sales call on psychiatrist Dr. Gallo. She has Leonard pose as a patient to get her in the door. Gallo disagrees with the way Leonard's mother approaches psychology. Leonard feels great talking with her. When Penny meets her, Gallo has her question why she often acts like a mother to Leonard, along with her other anxieties, such as Sheldon. She also makes Penny feels better after their talk. Gallo gives her a prescription, but not the one Penny was supposed to sell. While Amy is at a conference, Sheldon spends the day at the astronomy lab with Raj. After they discover a medium-sized asteroid, they argue about what to name it; Leonard suggests they name it after their girlfriends. Sheldon gets Raj to name it after Amy in exchange for any children Sheldon and Amy have being named Rajesh, even their daughters. Howard and Bernadette want to start remodeling the house and are excited when Stuart moves out, but are surprised when they find they miss him. Unbeknownst to them, Stuart sneaks back at night to watch them sleep.
196	13	"The Empathy Optimization"	Mark Cendrowski	Story by : Chuck Lorre & Eric Kaplan & Dave Goetsch; Teleplay by : Steven Molaro & Steve Holland & Saladin K. Patterson	January 14, 2016	4X7213	15.75
While Amy is still away, Sheldon has recovered from the flu, but though his friends attempt to help him, his rude behavior during his illness offends them. They decide to rent a party bus to Las Vegas to get away from him. Amy admits she, too, extended her trip to avoid him, and teaches Sheldon about empathy. After Sheldon realizes what he did was wrong, he apologizes to each of his friends in turn, but his apology to Emily goes wrong when he says dermatologists are not real doctors. When Raj tries to defend Sheldon, it leads to a fight between him and Emily. Sheldon decides not to go to Las Vegas with the group as a gesture of his regret but sneaks onto the bus with Stuart to make amends with Emily and fix things between her and Raj. Sheldon and Stuart then leave, but the others decide to let Sheldon and Stuart go with them after all.
197	14	"The Meemaw Materialization"	Mark Cendrowski	Story by : Chuck Lorre & Jim Reynolds & Maria Ferrari; Teleplay by : Steven Molaro & Steve Holland & Tara Hernandez	February 4, 2016	4X7214	15.29
Sheldon's grandmother "Meemaw" visits Pasadena to check out Amy. Meemaw distrusts Amy due to their breakup and lets slip that Sheldon had planned to propose. Both Sheldon and Amy tell Meemaw how they make each other a better person, so Meemaw tells them that she will not stand in their way. On the subject of marriage, however, Sheldon tells Amy to slow down as they have just got back together and had sex. Meanwhile, at the comic book store, Raj has a debate about Frozen with Howard, attracting the attention of Claire, a bartender working on a science-fiction screenplay for a children's film. She asks Raj to meet her for a scientific perspective on her plot. Raj wants to do this, but Howard and Bernadette warn him it could upset Emily. Raj is unsure where things are going with her but eventually tells Claire he has a girlfriend. Claire says they can still meet as two platonic adults. However, at the meeting, Raj fantasizes about having a family with Claire.
198	15	"The Valentino Submergence"	Mark Cendrowski	Story by : Steven Molaro & Jim Reynolds & Tara Hernandez; Teleplay by : Steve Holland & Eric Kaplan & Jeremy Howe	February 11, 2016	4X7215	16.25
Leonard and Penny go out to eat for Valentine's Day and realize that they are getting older after Penny is addressed as "Ma'am". Howard and Bernadette plan on using their new hot tub and find a rabbit floating in it. After nursing it back to health and naming it Valentino, the rabbit bites Howard, who heads off to the ER for a rabies shot. Bernadette decides for the moment not to tell him that she is pregnant. Raj finally decides to break up with Emily and then calls Claire, who has just gotten back together with her old boyfriend. Emily does not take him back, sending Raj into a depression. Sheldon and Amy host their first live episode of "Fun with Flags", taking live phone calls, wherein Amy ends up speaking with Raj and Barry Kripke about their love lives, which thoroughly depresses Sheldon. Amy does get Sheldon to admit their own breakup has made them a stronger couple. They are interrupted by Penny and Leonard, who barge in dressed as Cupids, throwing confetti in an effort to feel young again.
199	16	"The Positive Negative Reaction"	Mark Cendrowski	Story by : Eric Kaplan & Jim Reynolds & Saladin K. Patterson; Teleplay by : Steven Molaro & Steve Holland & Maria Ferrari	February 18, 2016	4X7216	15.24
Bernadette tells Howard she is pregnant. While he is excited at first, he begins panicking that he will be a bad parent. When Howard talks things over with the men, Sheldon is upset that a baby will change their social group. The others try to calm him down at a karaoke bar and come up with a possible way for him to make more money by expanding on Sheldon and Leonard's research and patenting the idea with a gyroscope. A drunk Sheldon says that, because he and Howard both grew up without fathers, Howard will know how important he is to his own child. Meanwhile, Bernadette meets with the women to tell them she is pregnant, though Leonard texts Penny beforehand. She is worried by Howard's reaction, but Amy and Penny tell her life will be better with a child. Bernadette shocks them by admitting the baby was conceived on Sheldon's bed. After their ideas for fun all turn out to be impossible to do because Bernadette is pregnant, the men invite them to sing karaoke with them. Howard and Bernadette soothe each other's fears. Everyone takes turns singing about babies to Bernadette, while Sheldon is shocked to learn what happened in his bedroom. The following morning, Penny and Leonard express happiness for Howard and Bernadette, while discussing having their own child someday.
200	17	"The Celebration Experimentation"	Mark Cendrowski	Story by : Chuck Lorre & Eric Kaplan & Jeremy Howe; Teleplay by : Steven Molaro & Steve Holland & Tara Hernandez	February 25, 2016	4X7217	15.94
When Amy plans a birthday party for Sheldon because he made her birthday so special, he is reluctant on account of a traumatic childhood experience in which his twin sister Missy and her friends lied to him that Batman was coming to their sixth birthday, thereby ruining all his birthdays thereafter. Nonetheless, he relents, and the friends hire TV's Batman, Adam West, to attend as their present. When Sheldon arrives, he is initially happy, but quickly panics and runs into the bathroom. Penny tries to talk to him and they open up to one another. He emerges to apologize to everyone, after which Amy and all assembled share a toast in Sheldon's honor. Sheldon is delighted to hear all the nice things said about him. They then receive a video call from Professor Stephen Hawking, who joins them in singing "Happy Birthday to You".
201	18	"The Application Deterioration"	Mark Cendrowski	Story by : Steven Molaro & Eric Kaplan & Adam Faberman; Teleplay by : Steve Holland & Jim Reynolds & Maria Ferrari	March 10, 2016	4X7218	14.68
Sheldon, Leonard, and Howard move forward with patenting their gyroscope idea, but are shocked to learn that, as Caltech employees, they are only entitled to 25% of any profits, and that Howard, as a NASA employee, is not legally entitled to any profits. They reluctantly agree to sign, allowing Sheldon to write their own contract to equally share the money from the remaining 25% with Howard. Bernadette is against this, as Sheldon belittles Howard every time they try to work together. When confronted about this, Sheldon agrees to make it part of the contract that he be respectful of Howard for the purposes of the patent. Sheldon also shows his generosity by stipulating that 1/4 of his profits will go to a scholarship fund for the Wolowitzes' baby. Meanwhile, Emily sends Raj a belated Valentine's gift (an antique Sextant) and wants to see him again. Raj turns to the women for advice but decides to go through with seeing her after they urge him not to. On his way there, Claire calls him to say she is now single and he should see her instead, since Emily is just manipulating him. Raj drives back and forth while talking to both women, unsure of whom he should see, before choosing Emily and ultimately sleeping with her.
202	19	"The Solder Excursion Diversion"	Mark Cendrowski	Story by : Bill Prady & Eric Kaplan & Maria Ferrari; Teleplay by : Steven Molaro & Steve Holland & Saladin K. Patterson	March 31, 2016	4X7219	14.24
While Leonard and Howard work in Howard's lab, their wives join them and help with their project. After leaving to pick up more solder, the two men are invited to see a preview of Suicide Squad and decide to lie to their wives and attend. Howard spitefully texts Raj, unaware that he is in the lab with the women. Raj is ready to help the women out their husbands' lie, but the men show up with flowers and apologize. Sheldon's old laptop finally dies, so Amy buys him a new one. He does not want to dispose of the broken one and takes Amy to a storage facility, where he reveals that he has never thrown anything away, including clothes, broken electronics, and toothbrushes. Amy now feels closer to him and begins to help him let go of his past, one small step at a time. Sheldon later sends her home so that he can Skype with her on his new high-resolution laptop.
203	20	"The Big Bear Precipitation"	Mark Cendrowski	Story by : Chuck Lorre & Dave Goetsch & Tara Hernandez; Teleplay by : Steven Molaro & Steve Holland & Jim Reynolds	April 7, 2016	4X7220	13.50
Amy persuades Sheldon to join her, Leonard and Penny for a weekend at a cabin in the woods. Sheldon is phobic to everything in the outdoors. After their hike is rained out, they play the game "Never Have I Ever", where Sheldon exposes Leonard's extra bank account that he keeps secret from Penny to be used for emergencies. Penny gets mad, but reluctantly understands. She admits she is unhappy in pharmaceutical sales, but also does not want to go back to acting or waitressing. She resolves to stick to her job in order to be responsible and pay off her credit card debt. Sheldon admits he was once arrested in a jaywalking incident, and Amy once pushed all the buttons in an elevator. Raj gets too involved in Bernadette's pregnancy by suggesting specialists and buying a huge Costco teddy bear. Howard tells him to back off, until Bernadette gets upset and wants both him and the bear back. He returns, and the three listen to the baby's heartbeat, though Raj gets a little too close again.
204	21	"The Viewing Party Combustion"	Mark Cendrowski	Story by : Eric Kaplan & Maria Ferrari & Jeremy Howe; Teleplay by : Steven Molaro & Steve Holland & Tara Hernandez	April 21, 2016	4X7221	14.16
As the group prepares to watch Game of Thrones at the apartment, Leonard refuses to go to Sheldon's quarterly roommate agreement meeting and is further annoyed when Penny takes Sheldon's side. Amy arrives and agrees with Leonard, stating her dislike of meetings regarding the relationship agreement. On the way there, Raj constantly brags about dating both Emily and Claire, annoying Howard. Stuart shows up in costume because Howard tricked him into wearing it. The group splits up, with Sheldon, Penny, Raj, and Stuart in one apartment and Leonard, Amy, and Howard across the hall. Leonard is further upset to learn Penny goes behind his back to Sheldon to get what she wants in the roommate agreement. Amy only took Leonard's side because she is jealous of how close Sheldon and Penny are. However, all fights come to an end when Howard accidentally eats pistachios from the Mortadella sub sandwich and has to go to the hospital after an allergic reaction. He is alright. The group compare all their scheming to the characters on the Game of Thrones series. The men later make fun of Stuart riding home on a bike while still in costume.
205	22	"The Fermentation Bifurcation"	Nikki Lorre	Story by : Steven Molaro & Jim Reynolds & Anthony Del Broccolo; Teleplay by : Chuck Lorre & Steve Holland & Tara Hernandez	April 28, 2016	4X7222	14.13
Penny wins a wine-tasting trip at work, so everyone but Sheldon and a pregnant Bernadette joins her. Raj is still dating both Emily and Claire but is not exclusive with either and decides to bring Claire, asking his friends not to bring up their relationship status. They meet Penny's old boyfriend Zack, who raises the potential military applications of Leonard and Howard's gyroscope system. This worries them, but Howard decides he still needs the money for his baby, so they move forward. Zack also flirts with Claire and questions why Raj is not more committed to her. Claire tricks Raj into admitting he is seeing someone else too. At home, Sheldon bores Bernadette with his love of trains and different types of toast, but she does enjoy a version of Dungeons & Dragons, in which her character is not pregnant and can enjoy alcohol, sushi, and hot tubs. She thanks him for a fun break from her pregnancy.
206	23	"The Line Substitution Solution"	Anthony Rich	Story by : Steve Holland & Saladin K. Patterson & Tara Hernandez; Teleplay by : Steven Molaro & Eric Kaplan & Maria Ferrari	May 5, 2016	4X7223	13.22
To avoid his mother Beverly and join the guys at a special screening of Avengers and Q&A session, Leonard has Penny collect her from the airport. Penny tries to bond with her but is countered with condescending or psychoanalytical remarks. Beverly offers to interview Amy, Bernadette and partners for a new book on high-achieving couples, but when Bernadette suggests she interview Penny too and Beverly dismisses her, Penny finally explodes and expresses her feelings at the insults. Beverly admits being insulted at neither being invited to her son's wedding nor even being informed of it. Penny suggests holding a new ceremony for Beverly, and they at last bond. Sheldon hires Stuart to shop with Amy instead of him so he can keep his place in line for the Q&A event. Amy, annoyed, pays Stuart to yell at Sheldon, and rejects Sheldon's flowers and apology delivered by Stuart. Stuart holds Sheldon's place in line so he can apologize to Amy in person. Sheldon's experience is finally ruined when only he is upset about a man joining friends in the line ahead of him.
207	24	"The Convergence Convergence"	Mark Cendrowski	Story by : Steven Molaro & Tara Hernandez & Adam Faberman; Teleplay by : Chuck Lorre & Steve Holland & Jeremy Howe	May 12, 2016	4X7224	14.73
When Leonard and Penny announce their second wedding ceremony, conflict arises between Leonard's divorced parents Beverly and Alfred. Sheldon has also invited his mother Mary. Beverly and Mary are still distant with each other, while Beverly and Alfred bicker. While the Hofstadters snipe at each other during dinner, Mary and Alfred bond over their dislike of Beverly and leave early, since they are staying at the same hotel. Sheldon and Leonard are later worried when neither parent will answer their phones that night, though Penny is amused at the thought that their parents are becoming closer. When Howard gets an e-mail from the U.S. Air Force about his gyroscope patent, he fears that the government is after him, due to negative portrayals of them in the media. Bernadette tries to convince him that he is paranoid, but Howard's fears increase when he sees a car following them to dinner, unaware that it is Leonard and Penny. His attempt to evade them causes him to drive recklessly, and he is pulled over by a policeman for a sobriety test.

== Ratings ==
Viewership and ratings per episode of The Big Bang Theory season 9
No.	Title	Air date	Rating/share (18–49)	Viewers (millions)	DVR (18–49)	DVR viewers (millions)	Total (18–49)	Total viewers (millions)
1	"The Matrimonial Momentum"	September 21, 2015	4.7/16	18.20	2.1	5.52	6.8	23.73
2	"The Separation Oscillation"	September 28, 2015	3.8/16	15.23	2.1	5.55	5.9	20.78
3	"The Bachelor Party Corrosion"	October 5, 2015	3.9/13	15.40	2.1	5.47	6.0	20.87
4	"The 2003 Approximation"	October 12, 2015	3.9/13	14.96	2.0	5.07	5.9	20.03
5	"The Perspiration Implementation"	October 19, 2015	3.9/13	14.68	2.0	5.51	5.9	20.20
6	"The Helium Insufficiency"	October 26, 2015	4.4/14	16.32	1.9	4.85	6.3	21.18
7	"The Spock Resonance"	November 5, 2015	3.7/13	14.81	2.1	5.19	5.8	20.00
8	"The Mystery Date Observation"	November 12, 2015	3.7/13	14.92	2.2	4.98	5.9	19.90
9	"The Platonic Permutation"	November 19, 2015	3.8/13	15.19	2.4	5.93	6.2	21.23
10	"The Earworm Reverberation"	December 10, 2015	3.8/14	15.27	2.5	6.20	6.3	21.47
11	"The Opening Night Excitation"	December 17, 2015	4.1/16	17.23	2.9	7.17	7.0	24.42
12	"The Sales Call Sublimation"	January 7, 2016	3.8/14	15.85	2.1	5.10	5.9	20.95
13	"The Empathy Optimization"	January 14, 2016	3.8/13	15.75	2.1	5.17	5.9	20.93
14	"The Meemaw Materialization"	February 4, 2016	3.8/13	15.29	2.1	5.33	5.9	20.62
15	"The Valentino Submergence"	February 11, 2016	3.8/14	16.25	2.3	5.78	6.1	22.03
16	"The Positive Negative Reaction"	February 18, 2016	3.8/13	15.24	1.9	5.17	5.7	20.41
17	"The Celebration Experimentation"	February 25, 2016	3.8/13	15.94	2.1	5.21	5.9	21.15
18	"The Application Deterioration"	March 10, 2016	3.5/13	14.68	2.0	4.80	5.5	19.49
19	"The Solder Excursion Diversion"	March 31, 2016	3.5/14	14.20	2.0	4.98	5.5	19.19
20	"The Big Bear Precipitation"	April 7, 2016	3.1/11	13.50	1.9	5.28	5.0	18.78
21	"The Viewing Party Combustion"	April 21, 2016	3.2/12	14.16	2.0	4.92	5.2	19.07
22	"The Fermentation Bifurcation"	April 28, 2016	3.4/12	14.13	2.0	5.12	5.4	19.25
23	"The Line Substitution Solution"	May 5, 2016	3.0/12	13.22	2.0	4.98	5.0	18.21
24	"The Convergence Convergence"	May 12, 2016	3.4/14	14.73	2.1	5.24	5.5	19.96

== Reception ==
The ninth season received mixed reviews, notably for its season premiere. John Doyle of The Globe and Mail criticized the humor of its 200th episode "The Celebration Experimentation", writing that "The show isn't funny any more. The same tired jokes go around in circles. It's dated and stale". Tom Eames of Digital Spy criticized the relationship between characters Leonard and Penny, writing that they "certainly don't have some passionate, Ross and Rachel-style 'will they / won't they' romance, with fans dying to see them together. Even now they're married, it's a weirdly anti-climactic payoff - and it doesn't quite feel right that they're together." Ashley Bissette Sumerel of TV Fanatic wrote that "For a rather serious season premiere, "The Matrimonial Momentum" is still a lot of fun".
