= The Big Bang Theory season 8 =

American television season

The Big Bang Theory
- Season 8
- DVD cover art
- Showrunner: Steven Molaro
- Starring: Johnny Galecki; Jim Parsons; Kaley Cuoco; Simon Helberg; Kunal Nayyar; Mayim Bialik; Melissa Rauch; Kevin Sussman
- No. of episodes: 24

Release
- Original network: CBS
- Original release: September 22, 2014 – May 7, 2015

Season chronology
- ← Previous; Season 7 Next → Season 9

The eighth season of the American television sitcom The Big Bang Theory aired on CBS from September 22, 2014 to May 7, 2015.

The series returned to its regular Thursday night time slot on October 30, 2014 after Thursday Night Football on CBS ended.

Mayim Bialik submitted the episode "The Prom Equivalency" for consideration due to her nomination for the Primetime Emmy Award for Outstanding Supporting Actress in a Comedy Series at the 67th Primetime Emmy Awards. Christine Baranski submitted the episode "The Maternal Combustion" for consideration due to her nomination for the Primetime Emmy Award for Outstanding Guest Actress in a Comedy Series at the 67th Primetime Creative Arts Emmy Awards.

Carol Ann Susi, the voice of the never-seen Mrs. Wolowitz, died of cancer at age 62 on November 11, 2014. In the season's fifteenth episode, "The Comic Book Store Regeneration", Howard Wolowitz receives a phone call that his mother died while visiting family in Florida.

== Production ==
In March 2014, the series was renewed for an eighth, ninth and tenth season through the 2016–17 television season.

In February 2014, CBS CEO Leslie Moonves announced that the first six episodes of the eighth season would air on a different night due to CBS acquiring the rights to Thursday Night Football games. In May 2014, CBS announced at its annual upfront presentation, that the series would begin its eighth season on Mondays, before returning to the Thursday slot once the football games end.

=== Delay ===
Production for the season was expected to begin on July 30, 2014, however the start was delayed due to the five main cast members' desire to renegotiate new contracts, with Johnny Galecki, Jim Parsons and Kaley Cuoco seeking approximately $1 million per episode, as well as more backend money. Simon Helberg and Kunal Nayyar negotiated together, separate from Galecki, Parsons and Cuoco's negotiations. Production was officially delayed on July 30, due to the contract negotiations, and was rescheduled for August 6, 2014. On August 4, Galecki, Parsons and Cuoco signed new contracts, worth $1 million per episode for three years, with the possibility to extend for a fourth year. The deals also include larger pieces of the show, signing bonuses, production deals and advances towards the back-end. The following day, Helberg and Nayyar renegotiated their contracts, giving them a per-episode pay in the "mid six-figure range", up from around $100,000 per episode they each received in years prior. The first table read for the eighth season took place on August 6.

== Cast ==
=== Main cast ===
- Johnny Galecki as Dr. Leonard Hofstadter
- Jim Parsons as Dr. Sheldon Cooper
- Kaley Cuoco as Penny
- Simon Helberg as Howard Wolowitz
- Kunal Nayyar as Dr. Rajesh "Raj" Koothrappali
- Mayim Bialik as Dr. Amy Farrah Fowler
- Melissa Rauch as Dr. Bernadette Rostenkowski-Wolowitz
- Kevin Sussman as Stuart Bloom

=== Special guest cast ===
- Billy Bob Thornton as Dr. Oliver Lorvis
- LeVar Burton as himself
- Nathan Fillion as himself
- Kevin Smith as himself (voiceover)

=== Recurring cast ===
- Carol Ann Susi as Mrs. Wolowitz
- Regina King as Janine Davis
- Michael Massimino as himself
- Laura Spencer as Emily Sweeney
- John Ross Bowie as Dr. Barry Kripke
- Brian George as Dr. V.M. Koothrappali
- Alice Amter as Mrs. Koothrappali
- Wil Wheaton as himself
- Laurie Metcalf as Mary Cooper
- Christine Baranski as Dr. Beverly Hofstadter
- Stephen Hawking as himself

=== Guest cast ===
- Stephen Root as Dan
- Kara Luiz as Jeanie
- Paul Wilson as Professor Sharpe
- Angela Relucio as Hostess
- Max Adler as The Zombie
- Tate Ellington as Mitchell
- Matt Bennett as Josh
- Sara Erikson as Gwen
- Kelli Goss as Chelsea

== Episodes ==
No. overall	No. in season	Title	Directed by	Written by	Original release date	Prod. code	U.S. viewers (millions)
160	1	"The Locomotion Interruption"	Mark Cendrowski	Story by : Jim Reynolds & Maria Ferrari & Tara Hernandez; Teleplay by : Steven Molaro & Steve Holland & Eric Kaplan	September 22, 2014	4X6751	18.08
Forty-five days after leaving Pasadena, Sheldon finds himself in a train station in Kingman, Arizona with all of his possessions (and his pants) stolen. He calls Leonard to pick him up, and Leonard takes Amy with him. Amy is hurt that Sheldon left without telling her, and that he called Leonard for help. Sheldon is not happy that she is there, and says he did not call her because he was too embarrassed to admit that he could not make it on his own; Amy accepts that he is not perfect. Sheldon thinks his trip was worthwhile because it has left him ready to deal with change, but as soon as he sees Penny's new haircut he immediately walks out of the apartment. Bernadette gets Penny a job interview with her pharmaceutical company as a salesperson, though Penny is very nervous about it, having no experience in sales. She does horribly in the interview, but gets the job anyway, after bonding with the interviewer over their shared fear of Bernadette. Howard and Raj find Stuart still living with Howard's mother even though she has recovered, which is very unsettling to Howard.
161	2	"The Junior Professor Solution"	Mark Cendrowski	Story by : Steven Molaro & Eric Kaplan & Steve Holland; Teleplay by : Jim Reynolds & Maria Ferrari & Tara Hernandez	September 22, 2014	4X6752	18.30
Sheldon is allowed to study what he wants in exchange for becoming a junior professor and teaching a class; he is not happy, and nobody signs up for his class because of his reputation. Howard decides to take the class to work on a doctorate, but Sheldon focuses on areas of physics that Howard does not understand to humiliate him. Howard gets him back by being a horrible student leading to an incident where he shoots a spitball into Sheldon's mouth, causing him to be reported to Human Resources. After dropping the class, Howard asks Sheldon engineering questions most of which Sheldon answers apart from one difficult one he is forced to admit he does not know. The men eventually heal by celebrating their own genius, and asking each other questions. Meanwhile, Bernadette feels Penny should start studying for her pharmaceutical job, but Penny wants to wait since she will undergo training anyway which leads to tension. Amy loves being in the middle, pretending to agree with both of them so she can spend time with each one alone and increase her bond of friendship by trash talking about the other woman and feeling immensely popular. Her good times are short-lived when Bernadette and Penny study and apologize to each other, and Amy ends up eavesdropping on her friends to see if they are getting along.
162	3	"The First Pitch Insufficiency"	Mark Cendrowski	Story by : Chuck Lorre & Jim Reynolds & Anthony Del Broccolo; Teleplay by : Steven Molaro & Steve Holland & Maria Ferrari	September 29, 2014	4X6753	16.44
Howard is asked to throw out the first pitch at a baseball game for the LA Angels of Anaheim, as an astronaut, to celebrate Space Day. Despite practicing, he cannot reach home plate. At the game Howard decides to use a prototype of the Mars rover to deliver the ball, but the Rover moves so slowly across the grass to deliver the ball that Howard is booed by the crowd and his friends in the stands. Earlier Leonard and Penny double date with Sheldon and Amy at a pub, and are baffled when Sheldon says the Shamy relationship is the stronger of the two, because they scored an 8.2 out of 10 on a scientific test used to measure a couple's compatibility. Leonard wants to take the test, but Penny refuses, worried that she and Leonard have nothing in common even though they are engaged. Leonard admits he shares this fear, but says it only strengthens his resolve that they can face it together. Penny is overwhelmed by Leonard's commitment, while Amy wishes Sheldon would say romantic things like that to her. Sheldon tells her that she should trust him that she is already happy because of their test score.
163	4	"The Hook-Up Reverberation"	Mark Cendrowski	Story by : Steve Holland & Maria Ferrari & Tara Hernandez; Teleplay by : Steven Molaro & Eric Kaplan & Jim Reynolds	October 6, 2014	4X6754	15.94
Leonard and Penny finally meet Raj's girlfriend Emily, but Penny feels that Emily does not like her. Emily agrees to let Penny practice a pharmaceutical sales pitch on her; however, Emily ignores her pitch. Emily admits she is unhappy that Penny previously hooked-up with Raj. Raj brings the two of them together to talk and Emily apologizes for being rude; however, after the meeting both women part and it is clear that they are still very uncomfortable with each other. Since Stuart did not get enough insurance money to reopen his comic book store, the men decide to invest in it as part owners. Penny wonders why Leonard wants to discuss finances, while Amy and Bernadette reluctantly accept the investment. Howard's mother has already given the money to Stuart and is calling him by Howard's old pet name "Bubula" upsetting Howard. Finally, the men are disappointed that they are not getting a nice comfortable homey place to sit and read comic books, though that is what they are doing in Leonard and Sheldon's apartment.
164	5	"The Focus Attenuation"	Mark Cendrowski	Story by : Jim Reynolds & Maria Ferrari & Adam Faberman; Teleplay by : Steven Molaro & Eric Kaplan & Steve Holland	October 13, 2014	4X6755	15.63
Sheldon claims the men have not invented anything significant recently because they had all been distracted by their girlfriends, so they plan a weekend of brainstorming. The women use the free time to go to Las Vegas. Reviewing their old brainstorming sessions the men find only ideas that involve robot girlfriends. Next they work on the hover board from Back to the Future Part II, but keep getting distracted much to Leonard's frustration. Later at Leonard's lab they have further distractions from the internet and end up back at home watching Ghostbusters along with Leonard. Meanwhile in Vegas, the women are about to go out when Penny is given some home work by her boss. Bernadette and Amy leave and get drunk. When they return to their room, they find Penny still studying, but take her with them to a strip club, where Amy and Bernadette have fun while Penny keeps studying. The next morning a relaxed Penny heads to the pool and gets her revenge for last night by blinding Bernadette and Amy with the sun from the window while they both deal with extremely terrible hangovers.
165	6	"The Expedition Approximation"	Mark Cendrowski	Story by : Steven Molaro & Dave Goetsch & Tara Hernandez; Teleplay by : Jim Reynolds & Steve Holland & Maria Ferrari	October 20, 2014	4X6756	16.02
After Penny gets a company car, she sells the one that Leonard gave her months ago and gives him the money. It bothers Leonard and leads to a conflict between the two. They later share a dinner with Howard and Bernadette to seek their counsel on marriage and finances, but this in turn leads to an argument between Bernadette and Howard over money since Bernadette earns more than Howard. Leonard and Penny decide to use it as an example of what not to do in their marriage and finish having sex on the money. Bernadette and Howard eventually make up as well. Raj and Sheldon see a chance to study dark matter by participating in experiments conducted in a salt mine. To test themselves, they crawl into a hot, sweaty steam pipe tunnel in the university basement with Amy waiting above ground. Sheldon fights several phobias including fear of enclosed places. He also reveals his fear that his new research will fail him like string theory did. Raj consoles him by relating his own fear when he first left India. When some rats show up, a panicked Sheldon quickly abandons Raj, who later excoriates Sheldon for doing so. Their simulation lasts eleven minutes, longer than Amy's estimates.
166	7	"The Misinterpretation Agitation"	Mark Cendrowski	Story by : Chuck Lorre & Eric Kaplan & Jim Reynolds; Teleplay by : Steven Molaro & Steve Holland & Maria Ferrari	October 30, 2014	4X6758	16.25
Sheldon meets the middle-aged Dr. Lorvis who tracked down a flirty pharmaceutical sales rep, Penny. Leonard explains to him that Penny is his fiancée, so he walks away looking sad realizing that Penny only flirts with him for sales. Sheldon invites him inside for a hot beverage. When Penny gets wind of this, she asks Leonard to get rid of him as she cannot communicate with her clients outside of work. Lorvis turns out to be a celebrity urinary specialist with a huge sci-fi memorabilia collection which he invites the men to see. Earlier, Bernadette tells the girls that she has been picked as one of the fifty most beautiful scientists for an article in a magazine. The magazine cancels the article because Amy wrote an email of complaint about the article since they would not have written about handsome male scientists and are objectifying women. Bernadette claims Amy is jealous because she cannot express her sexuality, causing a hurt Amy to storm out. After Sheldon teases that the Penny-Leonard relationship is doomed to fail, Lorvis locks them in his basement to go after Penny again, but at the staircase, he meets Amy and falls in love with her, confusing Penny. When he reveals he locked the men in his basement, Penny proceeds to call him out on his actions as he is acting creepy, and cannot chase every woman that is nice to him. When Leonard realizes that the men are locked in and calls Penny, she and Amy urge Lorvis to help them get the men out; he meets Bernadette, who wants to apologize to Amy, and falls in love with her, too. The women go back to Lorvis' house only to find the men are too busy playing Donkey Kong to notice. To pass the time, Lorvis proceeds to show the women his memorabilia.
167	8	"The Prom Equivalency"	Mark Cendrowski	Story by : Jim Reynolds & Steve Holland & Jeremy Howe; Teleplay by : Steven Molaro & Eric Kaplan & Maria Ferrari	November 6, 2014	4X6757	16.56
After finding Penny's old prom dress the girls decide to have a new prom on the roof. Sheldon is worried about the post-prom mating activities that he feels Amy will expect and has a panic attack after he sees how pretty Amy is. Amy reassures him he is under no pressure, but she does hope they will have intimacy one day. She also wants to tell Sheldon something, even if he cannot say it back. Sheldon surprises her by saying he loves her. Amy is shocked, then starts having a panic attack of her own. Howard is not happy since he figures Stuart will bring his mother. Stuart embarrasses him by bringing Howard's second-cousin Jeanie, the girl Howard lost his virginity to. Howard attacks Stuart in the limo for having relationships with his family members. A jealous call from Debbie causes Stuart to abandon Jeanie at the prom. Emily reveals she loves the darker versions of fairy tales, disturbing Bernadette. Leonard and Penny dance together romantically though no music is playing. They admit that they probably wouldn't have approached each other to dance if they had met at their proms, but are happy together now.
168	9	"The Septum Deviation"	Anthony Rich	Story by : Steven Molaro & Bill Prady & Maria Ferrari; Teleplay by : Eric Kaplan & Steve Holland & Tara Hernandez	November 13, 2014	4X6759	16.90
Leonard announces that he needs deviated septum surgery in one week. Sheldon, appalled, describes every imaginable risk of the surgery, so Leonard says he will reconsider. However, he secretly goes to the hospital with Penny for a last-minute earlier appointment, though Amy eventually spills the beans. Sheldon shows up in the waiting room and the hospital experiences a mild earthquake. Sheldon, worried about Leonard, runs toward the operating room but hits the glass door. The next day Leonard and Sheldon are home with bandaged noses. Leonard teases that Sheldon only did what he did because he really loves him. Later, Sheldon unpacks engraved urns he ordered for Leonard and himself. However, he had them engraved with morbid messages and thus cannot return them. Raj frets over finding a gift for his parents' 40th wedding anniversary until he learns that his parents are getting divorced and his father has moved out. Raj says little things caused mutual resentment to grow over the years. Bernadette and Howard cheer him up, but Bernadette fears the same fate for her marriage too. Howard and Bernadette try to say positive things about each other, but descend into sarcastic bickering.
169	10	"The Champagne Reflection"	Mark Cendrowski	Story by : Steven Molaro & Tara Hernandez & David Saltzberg & Ph.D; Teleplay by : Jim Reynolds & Steve Holland & Dave Goetsch	November 20, 2014	4X6760	14.61
Leonard, Raj and Howard clean out deceased Professor Roger Abbot's office and find champagne to be opened after his first great scientific discovery. Abbot's coworker Professor Sharpe reveals that a journal full of numbers is just Abbot's food calorie diary: he believed he could live forever by controlling his calorie intake. The men realize not every scientist can make great discoveries, and resolve to drink the champagne in Roger's honor if one of them ever discovers something. Sheldon prepares his final episode of "Fun with Flags" and reviews highlights of the series including Amy as a kangaroo, Sheldon dressed as Betsy Ross, and playing "Fwag, Not a Fwag" with Barry Kripke. Sheldon's final guest is LeVar Burton. The first viewer to comment on the episode posts that he will miss the series, leading Sheldon to plan its revival and uncork Roger's champagne in front of Leonard. Penny and Bernadette attend a banquet for their pharmaceutical company. After Penny makes Bernadette realize she has been verbally bullying others, she apologizes to their boss Dan (Stephen Root), who is afraid of her, and starts crying on hearing how she has offended her coworkers. Dan feels bad and resumes fulfilling Bernadette's wishes.
170	11	"The Clean Room Infiltration"	Mark Cendrowski	Story by : Maria Ferrari & Tara Hernandez & Jeremy Howe; Teleplay by : Eric Kaplan & Jim Reynolds & Steve Holland	December 11, 2014	4X6761	15.49
Raj will be unable to host Christmas dinner as his father is coming to town and is depressed about his divorce. Amy hosts a Victorian era Christmas dinner instead. Her traditional party games bore everyone. Sheldon and Amy have agreed not to exchange gifts, but Sheldon decides to get her one anyway as revenge for the dinner and kissing him in public under the mistletoe. Bernadette takes him to the mall where he gets his picture taken with Santa and a frame which includes a personalized Christmas message to Amy. To his surprise she loves it and gives him a box of Christmas cookies made from his grandmother's recipe, making them both happy and makes Sheldon wonder about the spirit of giving presents at Christmas time. Meanwhile, Leonard and Howard are working together in a clean room when a pigeon flies in. They are unable to get the bird out even with Raj's help. Howard is devastated when he accidentally injures the pigeon with a blast from a fire extinguisher. Leonard tells him how to revive it; however, a crow flies in. Howard and Leonard agree to take the blame for ruining the lab together until Penny convinces them to erase their names off the sign-up sheet for the lab and leave.
171	12	"The Space Probe Disintegration"	Mark Cendrowski	Story by : Bill Prady & Eric Kaplan & Jim Reynolds; Teleplay by : Steven Molaro & Steve Holland & Maria Ferrari	January 8, 2015	4X6762	18.11
Sheldon and Leonard are happy playing a board game until Amy and Penny say they are tired of doing what the guys want. The girls want to do something the guys hate, so Sheldon suggests clothes shopping. While waiting, Sheldon mentions he knows how to compromise because of all he does for Leonard, including still letting Leonard chauffeur him (which Leonard actually hates) though Amy is teaching him to drive. Leonard retorts that he compromises more for the often difficult Sheldon and that because of Sheldon, he does not live with fiancée Penny. Sheldon tearfully apologizes, stating his awareness of how problematic he is and how devastated he would be by Leonard leaving, resulting in both of them breaking down. They decide Leonard should move out gradually, and Sheldon agrees he can spend one night a week at Penny's, and whistle when he is not home. Leonard spends the night at Penny's, whilst Sheldon sleeps on her couch. Meanwhile, a stressed-out Raj, once part of a team that nine years earlier launched the now to be activated New Horizons space probe, spends the day with Howard and Bernadette and then takes Howard, initially surprised that scientist Raj leans on religion, to a Hindu temple. Raj verbally berates a man who dinged his car door, but calms down on hearing his space probe is fine.
172	13	"The Anxiety Optimization"	Mark Cendrowski	Story by : Eric Kaplan & Maria Ferrari & Adam Faberman; Teleplay by : Jim Reynolds & Steve Holland & Tara Hernandez	January 29, 2015	4X6763	17.25
Sheldon has a problem in his dark matter proton decay research. After Penny says doing a fitness routine she hates motivates her, Sheldon seeks to do the same with his anxiety level while he works. The guys enjoy irritating Sheldon when he asks them to do so, while he annoys the women when he tries to listen to their mindless girl talk. Sheldon becomes exhausted and hallucinates among other things. A frustrated Amy throws him out of her apartment when he focuses on his research and anxiety during their date night. On the bus home he hallucinates a man is really a mix of an armadillo and Isaac Newton. Leonard and Penny are able to get an exhausted Sheldon to sleep after singing Soft Kitty to him. Sheldon is able to continue his research afterwards. Meanwhile, Howard has invented a game called "Emily or Cinnamon" where the rest of the friends try to guess whether an embarrassing quote from Raj was said to his girlfriend or his dog. Raj is annoyed, but Emily is okay with it, thinking it is sexy that Raj is sensitive, until she kisses Raj and is repulsed by the dog hair in his mouth.
173	14	"The Troll Manifestation"	Mark Cendrowski	Story by : Steven Molaro & Eric Kaplan & Tara Hernandez; Teleplay by : Jim Reynolds & Steve Holland & Maria Ferrari	February 5, 2015	4X6765	17.09
Leonard has a revelation about Superfluid vacuum and presents his theory to Sheldon who approves. Sheldon writes a paper on their work and they post an online paper together. It is well received except for one troll who makes disparaging comments. Sheldon challenges this person, but panics when he tries to video call him. Leonard and Sheldon decide to stand up for themselves and are stunned when their harasser is revealed as Professor Stephen Hawking who actually liked their paper and had only commented negatively out of boredom. Meanwhile at Penny's apartment the girls spend the night embarrassing each other, first by watching the terrible gorilla movie that was Penny's last acting job, then Penny finds some video footage of a younger Bernadette in a beauty pageant, and finally Bernadette reveals Amy's romantic fan fiction of Little House on the Prairie theme about her and Sheldon: this backfires when they become invested in the story. Leonard also enjoys Penny reading the fanfic to him, but stops before a sex scene.
174	15	"The Comic Book Store Regeneration"	Mark Cendrowski	Story by : Jim Reynolds & Maria Ferrari & Jeremy Howe; Teleplay by : Steven Molaro & Eric Kaplan & Steve Holland	February 19, 2015	4X6764	17.49
Barry Kripke stops by to thank Amy for helping him with her ideas on string theory, which bothers Sheldon because she never helped him out when he was working on it. He complains to Penny who tells him to "let it go". Instead, Sheldon reveals that Amy was secretly performing experiments on Penny and Leonard and comparing the results with those of a chimpanzee, infuriating Penny. Leonard and Raj run into Nathan Fillion at a deli, but he denies he is an actor so he can eat in peace. Later, he admits who he is and offers to take a picture with them. Raj, who now doubts whether he is the real Nathan Fillion, asks questions to verify his identity and annoys him. Stuart has opened his newly-renovated comic book store, which impresses everyone except Howard who finds him using some of his mother's furniture. However, all arguments end when Howard gets a call from Florida where his mother is visiting, and receives news that she died in her sleep. Everyone, including Sheldon who knows how it feels to lose a family member, goes to comfort Howard. After he and Bernadette leave for Florida, the rest of the gang remember and toast Mrs. Wolowitz, with Leonard calling her "a loving mother to all of us".
175	16	"The Intimacy Acceleration"	Mark Cendrowski	Story by : Dave Goetsch & Eric Kaplan & Tara Hernandez; Teleplay by : Steven Molaro & Jim Reynolds & Steve Holland	February 26, 2015	4X6766	16.67
Amy has read about an experiment claiming two people can fall in love by asking each other a set of personal questions and staring into each other's eyes for four minutes. Sheldon and Penny try it in her apartment. Penny reveals she wishes she was as smart as her friends, and Sheldon wishes he had Penny's ability to understand social interaction. They bond as Sheldon tells Penny a secret: that it is his birthday. They do not fall in love but happily reflect on their friendship. Sheldon is startled when his friends throw him a surprise party when he returns home. Raj, Emily, Leonard and Amy try a bit of interactive theater when they go to an Escape room where participants have to solve puzzles to get out of a room. The four are disappointed after their scientific skills solve everything in six minutes. Meanwhile, Howard and Bernadette are at the airport having returned from his mother's funeral in Florida and are outraged the airline has lost her ashes. Howard feels guilty that he knowingly rejected his last chance to spend time with his mother by not driving her to her flight. He is relieved when her ashes are found but Bernadette worries he will put them in their bedroom.
176	17	"The Colonization Application"	Mark Cendrowski	Story by : Dave Goetsch & Jim Reynolds & Tara Hernandez; Teleplay by : Steven Molaro & Eric Kaplan & Maria Ferrari	March 5, 2015	4X6767	18.17
Sheldon and Amy decide to advance their relationship by buying a pet tortoise. However, Sheldon changes his mind after it bites him and Amy is hurt when she learns Sheldon has applied to colonize the planet Mars without consulting her. Sheldon does not understand why she cannot support the opportunity, however Amy makes him realize she wants them to plan their future together. They agree to make another application as a couple and are both amused that if they had children there they would technically be Martians. Leonard bought body paint and a canvas for himself and Penny to have sex on. They are disappointed with the initial results but push themselves into making something they like. They decide to give the canvas to Sheldon by telling him William Shatner painted it. Meanwhile, Emily leaves Raj alone in her apartment and he breaks a drawer while snooping. Raj fails to fix it with Howard and Bernadette listening via video call. Emily is angry, but soon forgives him and gets her revenge by scaring Raj into thinking there is something morbid in her closet.
177	18	"The Leftover Thermalization"	Mark Cendrowski	Story by : Steven Molaro & Maria Ferrari & Jeremy Howe; Teleplay by : Eric Kaplan & Jim Reynolds & Steve Holland	March 12, 2015	4X6768	16.13
Scientific American praises the paper Leonard and Sheldon wrote together, but omits Leonard's name. Sheldon fails to comfort Leonard over the omission, while Penny tries to cheer up Leonard by buying a motor-controlled helicopter for him. Meanwhile, Howard, Bernadette and Raj arrive at Howard's mother's home to remove some of her belongings, only to be told by Stuart the power is out. A distraught Howard realizes the last food his mother ever cooked will defrost in the freezer and be ruined. He decides to invite his friends over to eat it all, so it will be like his mother is feeding everybody one last time. At the dinner, Sheldon and Leonard argue about whether an idea's inspiration or execution is more important. Bernadette takes Sheldon and Leonard to another room and scolds them for their bickering and being insensitive to Howard whose mother recently passed away. Howard remarks that Bernadette's yelling sounds similar to his mother's, though the others claim to not hear it. Finally, everyone is over-stuffed from eating and lazing around the house. The group expresses mild excitement upon hearing that Physics Today has mentioned Leonard's name in connection with the paper, but are much more enthusiastic when Bernadette finds more Tums.
178	19	"The Skywalker Incursion"	Mark Cendrowski	Story by : Jim Reynolds & Tara Hernandez & Jeremy Howe; Teleplay by : Steven Molaro & Steve Holland & Maria Ferrari	April 2, 2015	4X6769	13.89
Sheldon and Leonard are headed to UC Berkeley to give a lecture on the paper they wrote together. With time to spare, they decide to drive by Skywalker Ranch but Sheldon wants to go inside, hoping to meet George Lucas. They get past the front gate, but Leonard tells the security guard the truth. Sheldon decides to make a run for it and is hit with a taser. They are let off with a warning and are forbidden to return. At home Leonard is initially angry, but admits it was a fun adventure and he enjoyed seeing Sheldon get tased. Meanwhile, the rest of the gang are cleaning out Mrs. Wolowitz's house for a garage sale. A dispute occurs over whether to sell Howard's Doctor Who's TARDIS. They agree to decide its fate via a Ping pong match with Penny playing for Bernadette and Raj for Howard. Penny starts losing so Bernadette has Raj playing for her with Amy playing for Howard. Amy is about to win until Bernadette says she could have the TARDIS's doors to trick Sheldon into going inside her bedroom. Amy does so, but is disappointed when Sheldon runs into her bedroom dressed as the Fourth Doctor.
179	20	"The Fortification Implementation"	Mark Cendrowski	Story by : Jim Reynolds & Saladin K. Patterson & Tara Hernandez; Teleplay by : Steven Molaro & Steve Holland & Maria Ferrari	April 9, 2015	4X6770	14.78
Sheldon is depressed because he was left out of a group attending a symposium at the home of Richard Feynman. On date night he mentions to Amy how his siblings left him out of building a blanket fort as kids. They decide to build their own in the living room and Sheldon has so much fun he agrees to let Amy spend her first night with him in a platonic sleepover. Amy had left a pre-positioned sleepover kit in the apartment just in case. Wil Wheaton has Penny on his podcast to talk about the terrible movie they worked on together, Serial Ape-ist 2. Kevin Smith calls to offer her an audition for Clerks III. Leonard, who is not thrilled with her risking her good pharmaceutical job, is stunned when he learns she makes twice the money than he does and is being more mature than him. Howard now owns his mother's house after his father Sam signed it away with no contact. While discussing future plans with Raj and Bernadette, Howard is shocked when he is visited by a half-brother, Josh.
180	21	"The Communication Deterioration"	Mark Cendrowski	Story by : Dave Goetsch & Steve Holland & Jeremy Howe; Teleplay by : Steven Molaro & Eric Kaplan & Jim Reynolds	April 16, 2015	4X6771	14.82
Raj is working on a proposal for NASA to design a method of communicating with extraterrestrial intelligent beings. He asks the guys for advice and Sheldon and Howard try to take control, so Raj invites only Leonard to work with him. The two realize Sheldon and Howard's ideas were good and ask them to work with them after all. The guys talk about times where they have individually felt excluded from fun group activities while working together. Penny is unsure whether she should risk her new career for a chance at acting again and goes to Sheldon for advice. At first Sheldon will not tell her what to do because people think he is too controlling. Penny uses his love of trains in an analogy to get him to say she should go to the audition, but not decide on any major career change yet. An optimistic Penny goes to the audition only to be reminded of the petty environment around other actresses. Penny thanks Bernadette for getting her the good pharmaceutical job and takes her and Amy on a special dinner after Bernadette's prodding.
181	22	"The Graduation Transmission"	Anthony Rich	Story by : Chuck Lorre & Dave Goetsch & Anthony Del Broccolo; Teleplay by : Steven Molaro & Steve Holland & Eric Kaplan	April 23, 2015	4X6772	14.63
Leonard has been asked to give the graduation speech at his old high school in New Jersey and is excited to bring Penny with him; however their flight is cancelled due to bad weather. Penny arranges with the school to broadcast Leonard's speech over Skype and buys him a "sexy graduate" costume for a graduation cap and gown. Leonard's speech starts out boring so he changes it as he reflects on his own high school life. He explains to the smart and forgotten kids that after they graduate the world will find them far more interesting than the popular students. Raj has bought a quadcopter (drone), but is unable to get it to work so he brings it to Howard and Sheldon to fix it. Raj's father is outraged at the cost of it so he cuts off Raj's allowance; however, Raj is able to leverage his parents' divorce as a way to get them both to separately send him more money. Howard tears the drone apart, but is unable to get it to work. At Bernadette's suggestion, the guys begrudgingly call tech support. While on the phone the drone activates itself after receiving a random signal and flies wildly around the apartment terrorizing everyone, capturing Howard, Sheldon, Raj, and Bernadette's terrified looks on the drone's video camera.
182	23	"The Maternal Combustion"	Anthony Rich	Story by : Steven Molaro & Tara Hernandez & Jeremy Howe; Teleplay by : Chuck Lorre & Jim Reynolds & Maria Ferrari	April 30, 2015	4X6773	13.85
Sheldon and Leonard are getting an award for the paper they wrote together and both their mothers are in town for the ceremony. Both mothers focus on Sheldon, making Leonard jealous. He is also irritated when Sheldon claims Penny's engagement ring stone is really a recycled and recut drill bit diamond. Beverly wonders why Leonard and Penny have not set a wedding date, while Mary is fine with them waiting. The mothers also get into an argument after Beverly describes Mary's religious beliefs as a superstition. Beverly later reflects with Sheldon that perhaps there are other ways than hers to raise children. The mothers make up and Beverly tries to show affection by hugging Leonard, though it is awkward for both of them. Meanwhile, Howard and Bernadette have moved into Mrs. Wolowitz's house with Stuart still living there as well. Bernadette is tired of the other two and Raj lazing around, so she makes them clean the kitchen. Raj points out to Howard that Bernadette acts like his mother. Howard tries to clean the kitchen like an adult but does a poor job. The three men continue cleaning while singing "It's the Hard Knock Life" from the musical Annie.
183	24	"The Commitment Determination"	Mark Cendrowski	Story by : Chuck Lorre & Jim Reynolds & Maria Ferrari; Teleplay by : Steven Molaro & Steve Holland & Eric Kaplan	May 7, 2015	4X6774	14.64
While making out on the fifth anniversary of their first date, Sheldon offends Amy by debating whether he should watch The Flash instead of focusing on her as she wonders where they are going in their relationship. Sheldon does not understand why everyone thinks their relationship has moved too slowly, pointing out that Leonard and Penny have not discussed their wedding plans in months. Amy tells Sheldon she needs to take a break from the relationship to figure out what to do, leaving Sheldon unsure of what to do with the engagement ring he got her. After deflecting Sheldon's questions, Leonard and Penny decide to elope in Las Vegas. While driving there, Leonard admits he drunkenly kissed another woman two years ago while on the boat in the North Sea. Penny is upset but appears to forgive him as they were not engaged then. Howard and Bernadette want Stuart to move out, but always find a reason not to bring it up. They finally get up the nerve to tell him, only to back off when they realize it is his birthday. Raj is spooked out by Emily's latest morbid idea: having sex in a graveyard. While having a picnic there, he says they are very different people and it appears he wants to break up, but when Emily confronts him he instead says he loves her.

== Ratings ==
Viewership and ratings per episode of The Big Bang Theory season 8
No.	Title	Air date	Rating/share (18–49)	Viewers (millions)	DVR (18–49)	DVR viewers (millions)	Total (18–49)	Total viewers (millions)
1	"The Locomotion Interruption"	September 22, 2014	5.5/17	18.08	2.4	5.64	7.9	23.75
2	"The Junior Professor Solution"	September 22, 2014	5.4/16	18.30	2.6	5.88	8.0	24.18
3	"The First Pitch Insufficiency"	September 29, 2014	4.8/15	16.38	2.2	5.27	7.0	21.71
4	"The Hook-Up Reverberation"	October 6, 2014	4.8/15	15.94	2.2	4.92	6.8	20.85
5	"The Focus Attenuation"	October 13, 2014	4.6/14	15.63	2.2	4.89	6.7	20.21
6	"The Expedition Approximation"	October 20, 2014	4.6/14	16.02	2.3	5.37	6.9	21.39
7	"The Misinterpretation Agitation"	October 30, 2014	4.1/14	16.25	2.3	5.28	6.4	21.59
8	"The Prom Equivalency"	November 6, 2014	4.3/14	16.56	2.4	5.54	6.7	22.09
9	"The Septum Deviation"	November 13, 2014	4.5/15	16.90	2.5	5.56	7.0	22.51
10	"The Champagne Reflection"	November 20, 2014	4.1/13	14.61	2.2	5.30	6.3	19.91
11	"The Clean Room Infiltration"	December 11, 2014	3.9/13	15.49	2.4	5.42	6.3	20.98
12	"The Space Probe Disintegration"	January 8, 2015	4.6/15	18.11	2.2	4.84	6.8	22.95
13	"The Anxiety Optimization"	January 29, 2015	4.5/15	17.25	2.3	5.24	6.8	22.49
14	"The Troll Manifestation"	February 5, 2015	4.6/16	17.09	2.1	5.23	6.7	22.32
15	"The Comic Book Store Regeneration"	February 19, 2015	4.5/15	17.49	2.5	5.95	7.0	23.44
16	"The Intimacy Acceleration"	February 26, 2015	4.5/15	16.67	2.4	5.53	6.9	22.20
17	"The Colonization Application"	March 5, 2015	4.8/16	18.17	2.3	5.15	7.1	23.32
18	"The Leftover Thermalization"	March 12, 2015	4.4/16	16.13	2.0	4.83	6.4	21.01
19	"The Skywalker Incursion"	April 2, 2015	3.4/14	13.89	2.3	5.46	5.7	19.35
20	"The Fortification Implementation"	April 9, 2015	3.5/13	14.78	2.3	4.88	5.8	19.66
21	"The Communication Deterioration"	April 16, 2015	3.9/15	14.82	2.1	4.77	6.0	19.59
22	"The Graduation Transmission"	April 23, 2015	3.6/13	14.63	2.1	4.82	5.7	19.45
23	"The Maternal Combustion"	April 30, 2015	3.4/13	13.85	1.8	4.68	5.2	18.54
24	"The Commitment Determination"	May 7, 2015	3.7/14	14.64	2.1	5.51	5.8	20.15

== Reception ==
The season premiere "The Locomotion Interruption” and the second episode “The Junior Professor Solution” received mixed reviews. MaryAnn Sleasman of TV.com praised character developments, and wrote that "there's a lot to be excited about with regard to this coming season" with some of the central characters more comfortable around each other. Emily Gould of Salon criticized the humor, writing that "I watched all seven episodes that had aired so far this season and didn't so much as expel air forcefully from my nose in response to any of the jokes". Oliver Sava of The A.V. Club also criticized the humor of the aforementioned episodes, writing that "A lot of the jokes are tired and the plotlines are standard sitcom material, but if it's worked for seven seasons, why switch it up now?"
