= The Platonic Permutation =

- The Big Bang Theory episode
- Episode no.: Season 9 Episode 9
- Directed by: Mark Cendrowski
- Story by: Jim Reynolds; Jeremy Howe; Tara Hernandez
- Teleplay by: Steve Holland; Maria Ferrari; Adam Faberman
- Production code: 4X7209
- Original air date: November 19, 2015
- Running time: 21 minutes

Guest appearances
- Elon Musk as himself; Wayne Wilderson as Travis

Episode chronology
← Previous "The Mystery Date Observation"	Next → "The Earworm Reverberation"
- The Big Bang Theory season 9

"The Platonic Permutation" is the ninth episode of the ninth season of The Big Bang Theory. The 192nd episode overall, it first aired on CBS on November 19, 2015. The story follows the characters throughout Thanksgiving. The first storyline explores Sheldon and Amy's relationship as they meet-up, after being broken up. The next subplot follows Bernadette, Raj, Emily and Howard where they volunteer at a soup kitchen and the last follows Leonard and Penny after they have a minor conflict as Penny forgets Leonard's birthday.

"The Platonic Permutation" features a guest appearance of South-African American entrepreneur and business magnate, Elon Musk as himself. Critics had mixed reviews of the episode. Critics praised Sheldon and Amy's storyline, but were critical of the other two subplots and Musk's appearance.

== Plot ==
With Sheldon Cooper and Amy Farrah Fowler still broken up and all of his friends busy for Thanksgiving, Sheldon tries to give Amy tickets he bought them to Thanksgiving dinner at the aquarium, but Amy suggests they can still go as friends. Along the way, Sheldon asks Amy questions about her current dating life and plays a game about fish. Despite the initial awkwardness, Amy answers his questions, and the two reconnect as friends.

Bernadette Rostenkowski, Raj Koothrappali and Emily Sweeney drag Howard Wolowitz to a soup kitchen to volunteer for the day, after Howard lies about going there to avoid Sheldon. At the soup kitchen, Howard encounters Elon Musk, the founder of SpaceX, and they bond over their interest in space travel.

Meanwhile, Leonard Hofstadter and Penny prepare Thanksgiving dinner at home for the gang. When he realizes she does not know his birthday, he proceeds to list personal things he knows about her but accidentally reveals his knowing that she hates the orange lingerie he bought her, which she only disclosed in her journal. To apologize for reading it without permission, Leonard dances in the lingerie, asking Penny to post an image of him onto her social media as punishment. Howard, Raj, Bernadette, and Emily arrive at the apartment around this time, to Leonard's embarrassment.

Later, Amy tells Sheldon she is ready to be his girlfriend again, but Sheldon declines, telling her that getting over their breakup was too difficult, but that he wishes to remain friends. Amy accepts but is disappointed by this.

== Production ==
The story was completed by Jim Reynolds, Jeremy Howe, and Tara Hernandez while the teleplay was written by Steve Holland, Maria Ferrari, and Adam Faberman. The episode was directed by Mark Cendrowski. It features a guest appearance of Wayne Wilderson as Travis, in addition to South African Canadian-American entrepreneur and business magnate, Elon Musk as himself.

It first aired in the US on CBS on November 19, 2015, and first aired in the UK on E4 on December 17, 2015.

== Reception ==
=== Ratings ===
The episode was watched live by 15.19 million viewers, and had a ratings share of 3.8, during its original broadcast in the US. The 7-day data showed the episode received a total of 21.23 million viewers. Its UK premiere received 2.285 million viewers (7 day data), with the expanded 28 day data receiving 2.515 million viewers, making it the most watched program on E4 for the week.

=== Critical response ===
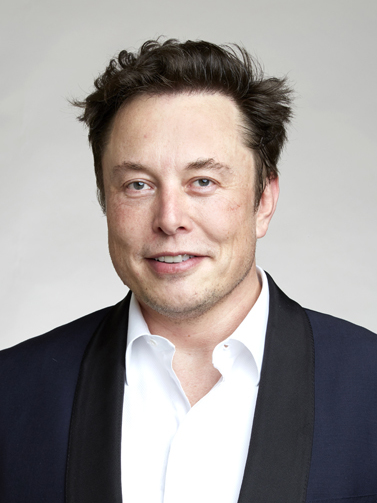
Elon Musk (pictured in 2018) guest-starred as himself. Critics were critical of his appearance.

"The Platonic Permutation" received mixed reviews from critics. Critics praised Sheldon and Amy's storyline but were critical of the other two subplots. IGN's Jesse Schedeen said of Sheldon and Amy's storyline saved the episode from "total mediocrity". Caroline Preece of Den of Geek praised Sheldon and Amy's storyline as well, saying the resolutions of the other two subplots had "left something to be desired". Digital Spy's Tom Eames said of "The Platonic Permutation": "Aside from a couple of sweet scenes with Sheldon and Amy, this was one of those episodes where you'd have a better time if you just looked at the photos and caught up on the synopsis on Wikipedia".

Schedeen opined that the soup kitchen storyline had potential but ultimately said it lacked humor. He and Eames criticized the lack of message for viewers about being thankful or generous and said that Howard's selfishness is instead rewarded by meeting Elon Musk. Preece was critical of the subplot saying Howard was "misused" by "providing lazy comedic relief to compensate for some of the more dramatic things" the show has done in "The Platonic Permutation" and the wider season.

Schedeen criticized Musk's appearance by saying he was not put to "very good use" and that his interactions with Howard were stiff and awkward. Eames concurred calling his appearance a "bit pointless and self-indulgent" and criticized his acting abilities.

Schedeen said the Leonard and Penny's subplot was mildly more entertaining than that of the soup kitchen but said parts of it felt repetitive. Eames concurred calling the storyline "mildly funny".

Schedeen praised Sheldon and Amy's storyline it was a "welcome way of bringing Sheldon and Amy back together without needlessly pushing them back into each other's arms". Eames and Schedeen praised the rare downbeat ending for the series when Sheldon declined to be Amy's boyfriend. Eames opined that it was revitalizing to see "Sheldon act so mature by admitting that getting over Amy was the one thing he hasn't 'excelled at', and deciding to stay just friends", calling it "one of the most realistic moments the show has ever had". Eames felt more focus should have been given to this storyline calling the other two "lazy and boring".

=== Awards ===
At the Art Directors Guild Awards 2015, John Shaffner (production designer), along with Francoise Cherry-Cohen (set designer), and Ann Shea (set decorator) won the Excellence in Production Design Award - Multi-Camera Television Series award for The Big Bang Theory for their work on "The Platonic Permutation", "The Skywalker Incursion", and "The Mystery Date Observation".
