= The Big Bang Theory season 10 =

The Big Bang Theory
- Season 10
- DVD cover art
- Showrunner: Steven Molaro
- Starring: Johnny Galecki; Jim Parsons; Kaley Cuoco; Simon Helberg; Kunal Nayyar; Mayim Bialik; Melissa Rauch; Kevin Sussman
- No. of episodes: 24

Release
- Original network: CBS
- Original release: September 19, 2016 – May 11, 2017

Season chronology
- ← Previous; Season 9 Next → Season 11

The tenth season of the American television sitcom The Big Bang Theory aired on CBS from September 19, 2016 to May 11, 2017.

The series returned to its regular Thursday night time slot on October 27, 2016 after Thursday Night Football on CBS ended.

== Production ==
In March 2014, the series was renewed for an eighth, ninth and tenth season through the 2016–17 television season.

Unlike the previous two seasons, the first five episodes of the tenth season aired on a different night due to CBS acquiring the rights to Thursday Night Football games. In May 2016, CBS announced at its annual upfront presentation that the series would begin its tenth season on Mondays, before returning to the Thursday slot once the football games ended.

Filming for the tenth season began on August 16, 2016, according to posts on Instagram and Twitter by several of the cast members including Kaley Cuoco and Mayim Bialik.

Several castings for the tenth season were announced before the season began airing. Variety announced on July 22, 2016, that Katey Sagal and Jack McBrayer had been cast as Penny's mother and brother, respectively. Information about the characters was that Sagal would play Susan, who was described as stressed out and neurotic from a life with her troubled son. McBrayer would play Randall, a cheerful former drug dealer and ex-con. Entertainment Weekly reported on August 10, 2016, a week before filming began, that Dean Norris would have a multi-episode arc in the tenth season, and would be playing Colonel Williams, a tough officer from the Air Force Research Laboratory, who is interested in the men's quantum gyroscope for military applications. On November 9, 2016, TVLine reported that Christopher Lloyd had been cast as Theodore for the season's tenth episode.

== Cast ==
=== Main cast ===
- Johnny Galecki as Dr. Leonard Hofstadter
- Jim Parsons as Dr. Sheldon Cooper
- Kaley Cuoco as Penny
- Simon Helberg as Howard Wolowitz
- Kunal Nayyar as Dr. Rajesh "Raj" Koothrappali
- Mayim Bialik as Dr. Amy Farrah Fowler
- Melissa Rauch as Dr. Bernadette Rostenkowski-Wolowitz
- Kevin Sussman as Stuart Bloom

=== Recurring cast ===
- Christine Baranski as Dr. Beverly Hofstadter
- Laurie Metcalf as Mary Cooper
- Dean Norris as Colonel Richard Williams
- Brian George as Dr. V.M. Koothrappali
- Brian Posehn as Dr. "Bert" Bertram Kibbler
- John Ross Bowie as Dr. Barry Kripke
- Pamela Adlon as Halley Wolowitz (voice only)
- Brian Thomas Smith as Zack Johnson

=== Guest cast ===
- Judd Hirsch as Alfred Hofstadter
- Keith Carradine as Wyatt
- Katey Sagal as Susan
- Jack McBrayer as Randall
- Josh Zuckerman as Marty
- Laura Spencer as Emily Sweeney
- Brandon Jones as The Flash
- Maria Canals-Barrera as Issabella Maria Concepcion
- Christopher Lloyd as Theodore
- Kate Micucci as Lucy
- Alessandra Torresani as Claire
- Katie Leclerc as Emily
- April Bowlby as Rebecca
- Riki Lindhome as Ramona Nowitzki

== Episodes ==
No. overall	No. in season	Title	Directed by	Written by	Original release date	Prod. code	U.S. viewers (millions)
208	1	"The Conjugal Conjecture"	Mark Cendrowski	Story by : Chuck Lorre & Steve Holland & Tara Hernandez; Teleplay by : Steven Molaro & Eric Kaplan & Jim Reynolds	September 19, 2016	T12.15303	15.82
The gang prepares for Leonard and Penny's second wedding ceremony. Sheldon and Leonard fear that Mary slept with Alfred the previous night, though they swear nothing happened. They do, however, plan to visit each other, irritating Beverly. Penny's family arrives. Her mother worries that her son's recent jail stint will cause Leonard's family to think of them as white trash. The ceremony goes well, with Leonard and Penny declaring their love for each other, Beverly and Alfred grateful they at least made Leonard together during their relationship, and Sheldon declaring his love for the couple. Howard is contacted by Colonel Richard Williams of the Air Force Research Laboratory, who scares both him and Raj. Howard eventually agrees to meet him, but the colonel refuses to give the reason for his interest.
209	2	"The Military Miniaturization"	Mark Cendrowski	Story by : Chuck Lorre & Eric Kaplan & Jim Reynolds; Teleplay by : Steven Molaro & Steve Holland & Maria Ferrari	September 26, 2016	T12.15301	14.24
Leonard and Howard worry the military might try to take over the guidance system project for weaponry, but Sheldon does not. They make him promise not to talk during the meeting with Colonel Williams. The colonel is impressed with Howard as the main brain behind the project, making Sheldon squirm. The military wants a smaller version made, perhaps in four months. Sheldon, no longer able to contain himself, promises to have it in two. Though the others are angry about such a tight deadline, they all have fun with their new lab's retinal scanner. Meanwhile, the pharmaceutical company employees have found out Bernadette is pregnant, infuriating her as they might take her off the next big medical project. Penny admits she was the one who let this slip. Bernadette forgives her because she intends to threaten her boss with a lawsuit if she is taken off the project.
210	3	"The Dependence Transcendence"	Mark Cendrowski	Story by : Steven Molaro & Saladin K. Patterson & Tara Hernandez; Teleplay by : Steve Holland & Maria Ferrari & Jeremy Howe	October 3, 2016	T12.15302	14.32
Sheldon, Leonard, and Howard are exhausted from trying to meet the Air Force's deadline that Sheldon set into motion. In a dream, The Flash persuades Sheldon to take an energy drink. After it wears off, Sheldon is convinced he is addicted, further annoying the other two. Sheldon breaks down and admits he cannot figure out the math and is not as smart as he thought. The others comfort him. Facing Colonel Williams, they admit that they need at least two years, which to their surprise is easily accepted as the military is used to contractors not meeting deadlines. Amy takes Penny to a party thrown by Bert the geologist, but they discover they are the only ones there. Bert shocks them by saying Amy is the most popular scientist at Caltech. Raj tries to help Bernadette get the nursery ready, but she admits her lack of excitement makes her fear she cannot be maternal. Raj calls his OB-GYN father, who tells Bernadette that, while she may not like babies in general, she can still love her own child.
211	4	"The Cohabitation Experimentation"	Mark Cendrowski	Story by : Chuck Lorre & Dave Goetsch & Maria Ferrari; Teleplay by : Steven Molaro & Steve Holland & Tara Hernandez	October 10, 2016	T12.15304	14.41
After a plumbing problem makes Amy's apartment uninhabitable for five weeks, Leonard and Penny suggest Amy move into Leonard and Sheldon's apartment. After Amy proposes their cohabitation as an experiment, Sheldon agrees to move with her into Penny's apartment, thrilling Leonard and Penny. Amy's first night in Sheldon's bed is rough and she does not get much sleep due to Sheldon's tossing and turning. To celebrate their first night alone without Sheldon, Leonard and Penny dance in their underwear in their apartment. The next morning, Sheldon and Amy fight over scientific integrity, working themselves up until Amy suggests they head for Penny's apartment to make out. After an ultrasound, Howard and Bernadette are angry that Raj knows the sex of their baby when they had elected not to find out. They have a bad night debating whether to call Raj about it.
212	5	"The Hot Tub Contamination"	Mark Cendrowski	Story by : Chuck Lorre & Maria Ferrari & Tara Hernandez; Teleplay by : Steve Holland & Eric Kaplan & Jim Reynolds	October 17, 2016	T12.15305	14.20
Amy and Sheldon storm into Leonard and Penny's apartment arguing about Sheldon requiring a bathroom schedule. To help him cool off, Penny takes Sheldon to an ice cream parlor, where he tries to hunt for a different romantic partner. Sheldon confesses that he once walked in on his father with another woman when he was thirteen, which is why he always knocks three times when entering a room now, and it makes him worry that he will hurt Amy one day. In season 7 of Young Sheldon it is revealed that the woman in question was not another woman, but his mother roleplaying. Penny convinces Sheldon to give the relationship a chance. Leonard coaches Amy on how to live with Sheldon. Returning, Sheldon agrees to compromise, so he does away with the bathroom schedule and agrees to share a toothbrush holder, a big step for Sheldon. After a weekend getaway goes canceled, Howard and Bernadette find Raj and Stuart secretly coming into their house and using the hot tub. They listen in as Raj reveals he is now single, but finally kick them out when Stuart says he is not wearing a bathing suit.
213	6	"The Fetal Kick Catalyst"	Mark Cendrowski	Story by : Steve Holland & Tara Hernandez & Jeremy Howe; Teleplay by : Steven Molaro & Saladin K. Patterson & Anthony Del Broccolo	October 27, 2016	T12.15306	14.31
Sheldon throws a brunch to surprise Amy, who wanted to invite guests over; Stuart, Bert from the geology lab, and a Romanian neighbor from downstairs attend. Stuart is insulted when he learns that the brunch was a test run before inviting others over; Sheldon apologizes and they get drunk, complimenting each other and annoying Amy. Penny gets invited to a Van Nuys Comic-Con event to sign autographs since she starred in two Serial Apeist movies; she is humiliated by fans deriding her poor acting ability but loving her topless shower scene. Leonard ends up holding court describing how he married such an attractive woman. When Howard finally feels the baby kick, he and Raj go shopping for a crib and test-driving a minivan for 24 hours, but Howard injures his back and they drive to the ER.
214	7	"The Veracity Elasticity"	Mark Cendrowski	Story by : Steven Molaro & Eric Kaplan & Maria Ferrari; Teleplay by : Steve Holland & Jim Reynolds & Adam Faberman	November 3, 2016	T12.15307	14.18
Sheldon finds out from Leonard through Bernadette that Amy's apartment was repaired two weeks ago and that Amy lied about it to keep living with him. Leonard learns from Howard through Bernadette that Penny has been secretly moving Leonard's collectibles into storage. As Penny covers for Amy over her lie, Sheldon and Leonard confront them for lying to them. Sheldon forgives Amy and wants to keep living with her, but is torn about where he really belongs, especially after having a nightmare of Leonard and Penny turning his old room into a sex dungeon. He chooses to live with Amy after engaging in an intellectual conversation with her. Leonard also agrees to let Penny decorate their bedroom to make her feel more at home, but when she makes the room look too girly, he puts some of the stuff into Sheldon and Amy's new closet.
215	8	"The Brain Bowl Incubation"	Mark Cendrowski	Story by : Chuck Lorre & Steve Holland & Saladin K. Patterson; Teleplay by : Steven Molaro & Maria Ferrari & Tara Hernandez	November 10, 2016	T12.15308	14.47
Amy uses skin cells from her and Sheldon to produce some primitive neurons through transdifferentiation. This inspires Sheldon to want to have a child with Amy, though she is not enthusiastic about his plan to have a child immediately. Sheldon launches a plan to seduce his girlfriend. Raj becomes attracted to Issabella, a cleaning woman at his lab, and fixes her dinner. She is insulted when she discovers that Raj told his friends that she was a fellow astronomer, but agrees to another date.
216	9	"The Geology Elevation"	Mark Cendrowski	Story by : Chuck Lorre & Erik Kaplan & Maria Ferrari; Teleplay by : Steve Holland & Jim Reynolds & Jeremy Howe	November 17, 2016	T12.15309	14.34
Sheldon learns that Bert has won a MacArthur Fellowship prize for his work on endolithic organisms and has to deal with his professional jealousy, repeatedly injuring himself while trying to cope. The rest of the group discuss their own internal jealousies. Professor Hawking calls Sheldon and explains that even he gets jealous. In order to make peace, Sheldon goes with Bert to a taping of The Ellen DeGeneres Show. Meanwhile, Howard finds a remote-controlled miniature Stephen Hawking he once built and, while everyone (except Kripke) thinks it is offensive, Hawking would actually like the idea.
217	10	"The Property Division Collision"	Mark Cendrowski	Story by : Steve Holland & Bill Prady & Steve Goetsch; Teleplay by : Steven Molaro & Maria Ferrari & Tara Hernandez	December 1, 2016	T12.15310	14.54
After Sheldon and Amy take the ugly portrait of Penny and Amy to Leonard and Penny's apartment, the guys start to divide up their belongings. When Sheldon tries to take everything, a dispute over the official apartment flag starts a war between Sheldon and Leonard. Sheldon rents out his old room to an old man, Theodore (Christopher Lloyd), who helps them to realize that Sheldon moving out is affecting both of them deeply, leading Sheldon to acquiesce regarding the flag. Stuart brings Howard and Bernadette a gift and ends up moving back in because he was evicted from his apartment. Stuart helps them with baby things to justify his moving in, starting a war with Raj who claims he was first in line to help them. Finally, Bernadette goes into labor and everyone heads to the hospital for the arrival of the baby.
218	11	"The Birthday Synchronicity"	Nikki Lorre	Story by : Chuck Lorre & Steve Holland & Maria Ferrari; Teleplay by : Steven Molaro & Eric Kaplan & Tara Hernandez	December 15, 2016	T12.15311	15.96
The impending birth of Bernadette and Howard's baby coincides with Amy's birthday, which interferes with Sheldon and Amy's annual sex date. Raj accidentally reveals the baby is a girl and is kicked out of the Wolowitz house. When the time comes for the baby to be delivered, everyone waits in the lobby of the hospital. The friends all reminisce about how much has changed in the past ten years, though Raj gets upset as he has not accomplished anything professionally or personally compared to the others. Halley Wolowitz is born and her parents decide to make Raj her godfather to lift his spirits. The baby's cry sounds like her grandmother, Debbie Wolowitz. After going to The Wizarding World of Harry Potter, Amy and Sheldon finally have their annual birthday coital festivities.
219	12	"The Holiday Summation"	Mark Cendrowski	Story by : Steven Molaro & Eric Kaplan & Tara Hernandez; Teleplay by : Steve Holland & Maria Ferrari & Jeremy Howe	January 5, 2017	T12.15312	16.80
After the Christmas holiday, Sheldon and Amy tell Leonard and Penny about their visit to his mother Mary, who upset Sheldon by confessing she never thought he would find a partner. Sheldon reacted by acting anti-socially and getting his ear pierced. Also, Leonard and Penny had a series of mishaps chopping down a Christmas tree and bringing it home, while Bernadette and Howard have been struggling to cope with a constantly screaming baby. Eventually, Bernadette does resolve the problem by climbing into Halley's crib and sleeping with her.
220	13	"The Romance Recalibration"	Mark Cendrowski	Story by : Chuck Lorre & Dave Goetsch & Anthony Del Broccolo; Teleplay by : Steven Molaro & Steve Holland & Saladin K. Patterson	January 19, 2017	T12.15313	15.15
Penny feels Leonard is not putting enough effort into their relationship now that they are married. Leonard thinks that he is the only one putting in any effort at all. Angrily, Penny takes Amy with her to a spa weekend in lieu of Leonard. Sheldon and Leonard soon follow, solving the problem by having Sheldon create a Relationship Agreement for Leonard and Penny just like Sheldon and Amy's. Meanwhile, Howard and Raj create a path in the baby's room to the crib without causing the floorboards to squeak, thus disturbing baby Halley, with an overly complicated solution.
221	14	"The Emotion Detection Automation"	Mark Cendrowski	Story by : Chuck Lorre & Steven Molaro & Eric Kaplan; Teleplay by : Steve Holland & Jim Reynolds & Saladin K. Patterson	February 2, 2017	T12.15314	14.66
Sheldon wants to understand others' emotions better and gets an experimental machine from MIT that reads other people for him. It reveals Leonard is angry about Penny inviting her ex-drug dealing brother to stay with them while he applies for a job at her pharmaceutical company. Sheldon is upset the machine works so well, as he feels he cannot understand others himself, but Amy comforts him, proud of his progress. Leonard and Penny apologize for blaming their fight on him, while Penny still intends to blame Leonard to her family as the reason why Randall cannot stay with them. Meanwhile, after being dumped by his latest girlfriend, Raj calls together several of his ex-girlfriends to find out why he is still single. Emily Sweeney, Lucy, Claire, and Emily the deaf woman tell Raj that he has been pushy, vain, needy and too scared of his parents and subsequently leave him feeling down, since they all found better relationships after they dumped him. Howard promises that, if things do not work out with Bernadette, he will become Raj's partner in thirty years.
222	15	"The Locomotion Reverberation"	Mark Cendrowski	Story by : Chuck Lorre & Steve Holland & Jim Reynolds; Teleplay by : Steven Molaro & Maria Ferrari & Tara Hernandez	February 9, 2017	T12.15315	14.15
Sheldon, Leonard, and Howard are nearly finished with their guidance system for the military, but Sheldon thinks it could be even smaller, frustrating the others as they have just met the approved specifications. To distract him for a few days, Leonard gifts him a trip to be a train conductor in Nevada. The trip greatly excites Sheldon, becoming all he thinks about, frustrating Amy. After seeing Sheldon's theory, Colonel Williams orders his smaller version to be made instead (he actually points at the Schrodinger equation), so Leonard and Howard try and get him to come back, but he refuses, saying that theory can never be proven, unlike trains. After Sheldon sees through their attempt to trick him into correcting a purposely wrong equation, Howard promises to teach him the mechanics of trains in exchange for his help, also allowing him to build the smaller guidance system with them. Meanwhile, Penny and Amy take Bernadette out to get her mind off motherhood duties, leaving Raj and Stuart to babysit Halley. However, Bernadette becomes worried about Halley when Raj and Stuart repeatedly call her while having a few minor mishaps and the fact that Bernadette now has a big house and a family of her own has made Penny and Amy sad over the slow progress in their own relationships.
223	16	"The Allowance Evaporation"	Mark Cendrowski	Story by : Eric Kaplan & Maria Ferrari & Jeremy Howe; Teleplay by : Steven Molaro & Steve Holland & Jim Reynolds	February 16, 2017	T12.15316	13.51
Sheldon and Amy are out on a date when Bert the geologist is stood up. He says he admires them other than their only having sex once a year. Amy is angry Sheldon told everyone at the university. Sheldon apologizes, now understanding the need for privacy, and also informs Amy of one of his private secrets: that he got his driver's license two years ago, but lets her chauffeur him to feel important. Meanwhile, Raj's father has stopped trying to find him a wife since Raj still relies on him to pay for everything. Raj's friends make him realize he is spoiled. Raj decides to stop taking the money to prove everyone wrong, though his father is very happy that he is finally trying to be independent.
224	17	"The Comic-Con Conundrum"	Mark Cendrowski	Story by : Eric Kaplan & Saladin K. Patterson & Tara Hernandez; Teleplay by : Steven Molaro & Steve Holland & Maria Ferrari	February 23, 2017	T12.15317	13.38
Raj appoints Sheldon as his financial manager and is told he cannot afford to go to San Diego Comic-Con this year due to his high rent and massive credit card debt. Raj tries selling his collectibles and working for Stuart to make extra money. Howard does a bunch of chores so Bernadette will let him leave for five days. Penny says she wants to go with the guys to make Leonard happy, but they both secretly think she will be miserable, leading to tension until Sheldon and Amy reveal the truth to their respective best friends. Howard and Bernadette try to pay Raj for babysitting Halley, but he rejects the money along with his chance to go. Leonard decides to stay home to be with Penny and Howard does the same for his family. Sheldon still plans on going, confounding Amy with his attempts to have her join him.
225	18	"The Escape Hatch Identification"	Mark Cendrowski	Story by : Steven Molaro & Eric Kaplan & Anthony Del Broccolo; Teleplay by : Steve Holland & Jim Reynolds & Tara Hernandez	March 9, 2017	T12.15318	13.08
Raj can no longer afford his apartment, so Leonard and Penny temporarily give him Sheldon's old room. This makes Sheldon uncomfortable and he calls Beverly to have her analyze why. She claims he views his old room as an escape hatch should things go wrong with Amy and that Leonard and Penny need a roommate to distract themselves from their own relationship problems. The group's fighting leads to Raj leaving and scaring Howard, Bernadette, and Stuart in the middle of the night. The couples are able to work through their issues and Raj is invited back to stay with Leonard and Penny.
226	19	"The Collaboration Fluctuation"	Mark Cendrowski	Story by : Chuck Lorre & Tara Hernandez & Giuseppe Graziano; Teleplay by : Steven Molaro & Steve Holland & Dave Goetsch	March 30, 2017	T12.15319	12.78
Sheldon and Amy attempt to analyze the Copenhagen interpretation using the neurobiology of decision-making. Professionally collaborating for the first time, they try to be nice for the sake of their relationship, but their work is of poor quality. They find that insulting each other makes them more creative, so they compile a list of topics on which insults are allowed. Meanwhile, Penny and Raj bond over girly things, causing Leonard to feel left out. Howard and Bernadette suggest that he talk to them, but when Leonard tries to express his feelings, Raj and Penny keep talking over him.
227	20	"The Recollection Dissipation"	Mark Cendrowski	Story by : Eric Kaplan & Tara Hernandez & Jeremy Howe; Teleplay by : Steven Molaro & Steve Holland & Maria Ferrari	April 6, 2017	T12.15320	12.59
Sheldon pushes himself to work on the guidance system with Howard and Leonard and his project with Amy on the same day. He catches a cold and wakes up the next day, half-naked and with no memory of what he did after he took cold medicine. His notebook of classified information on the military project is gone. Tracking his phone, they discover that Sheldon went to a Western-themed bar. He gets the notebook back, but learns he told everyone there about the project after making them pinky swear to secrecy. Amy then performs "Soft Kitty" for Sheldon in different languages using an autoharp. Meanwhile, Bernadette feels guilty about returning to work so soon and leaving Halley. Howard thinks she is mad at him for not telling her her aunt died six years ago, but makes her feel better by saying that they can change their choices if they want and Halley will not remember this anyway.
228	21	"The Separation Agitation"	Mark Cendrowski	Story by : Steven Molaro & Jim Reynolds & Maria Ferrari; Teleplay by : Steve Holland & Tara Hernandez & Jeremy Howe	April 13, 2017	T12.15321	11.89
Bert the geologist interrupts the latest "Fun with Flags" episode to tell everyone he has a girlfriend now, a personal trainer named Rebecca. He brings her to meet the gang, but it becomes clear that she is only with Bert for his grant money. They convince him to dump her. However, he misses her, calling "Fun With Flags" again to say that he got her back by purchasing her a jet ski. Meanwhile, Howard, Bernadette, and Stuart are all upset about leaving Halley at the university's daycare. Howard and Stuart take her out the first day to go to an aquarium and bring Bernadette with her to see her off to daycare the next day.
229	22	"The Cognition Regeneration"	Mark Cendrowski	Story by : Steve Holland & Tara Hernandez & Jeremy Howe; Teleplay by : Dave Goetsch & Eric Kaplan & Jim Reynolds	April 27, 2017	T12.15322	12.52
Sheldon loses his edge at online gaming and tries several new tasks to keep his mind sharp: baking with Raj, juggling with Howard, and riding a unicycle. Amy says maybe he should just focus on living well. Sheldon does agree with her, but also wants to try stilts. Penny runs into her ex-boyfriend Zack, who offers her a job at his menu company. Penny likes the idea and Leonard reluctantly supports her, despite having reservations about their previous relationship and her potential choice of careers. Penny calls Zack to accept the job but says he cannot, as his fiancée is not fond of the idea of him working with his ex-girlfriend, leaving Penny to concede to Leonard. Meanwhile, Howard is tired of Bernadette making fun of his magic tricks and finds her old ventriloquist dummy, though she uses it to scare Howard.
230	23	"The Gyroscopic Collapse"	Anthony Rich	Story by : Chuck Lorre & Steve Holland & Alex Ayers; Teleplay by : Steven Molaro & Jim Reynolds & Saladin K. Patterson	May 4, 2017	T12.15323	12.39
Leonard, Howard, and Sheldon finish their gyroscope for the Air Force, only to have it confiscated by the military for classified reasons. The loss of the project causes Howard to become clingy with Bernadette, though he reminds her that she has behaved in a similar manner after setbacks at her own job. Raj moves out of Leonard and Penny's apartment and into a room above Bert's garage. Amy is offered a summer position as a guest researcher at Princeton. Though Sheldon initially takes the news badly, he ultimately agrees she should accept the offer, and they have a night of unscheduled sex before she leaves.
231	24	"The Long Distance Dissonance"	Mark Cendrowski	Story by : Steven Molaro & Eric Kaplan & Jim Reynolds; Teleplay by : Chuck Lorre & Steve Holland & Tara Hernandez	May 11, 2017	T12.15324	12.99
With Amy away, Sheldon's old admirer Dr. Ramona Nowitzki begins to hang around him at Caltech and, later, his home. The rest of the gang become convinced she is pursuing Sheldon, alarming Amy. They do their best to keep her away from him, even following her to her car after dinner as a group. Sheldon does not believe Ramona is romantically interested in him but, when he asks her about it, she kisses him. Sheldon immediately departs and flies to New Jersey, proposing to Amy the second she answers the door.

== Ratings ==
Viewership and ratings per episode of The Big Bang Theory season 10
No.	Title	Air date	Rating/share (18–49)	Viewers (millions)	DVR (18–49)	DVR viewers (millions)	Total (18–49)	Total viewers (millions)
1	"The Conjugal Conjecture"	September 19, 2016	3.8/13	15.82	2.0	5.70	5.8	21.52
2	"The Military Miniaturization"	September 26, 2016	3.6/12	14.24	2.0	5.48	5.6	19.73
3	"The Dependence Transcendence"	October 3, 2016	3.5/13	14.32	1.9	5.04	5.4	19.37
4	"The Cohabitation Experimentation"	October 10, 2016	3.4/12	14.41	2.0	5.28	5.4	19.69
5	"The Hot Tub Contamination"	October 17, 2016	3.5/12	14.20	1.8	4.97	5.3	19.17
6	"The Fetal Kick Catalyst"	October 27, 2016	3.4/13	14.31	1.9	5.16	5.3	19.47
7	"The Veracity Elasticity"	November 3, 2016	3.1/12	14.18	2.0	5.45	5.1	19.63
8	"The Brain Bowl Incubation"	November 10, 2016	3.4/13	14.47	2.0	5.32	5.4	19.79
9	"The Geology Elevation"	November 17, 2016	3.1/12	14.34	2.0	5.58	5.1	19.92
10	"The Property Division Collision"	December 1, 2016	3.1/11	14.54	1.9	5.40	5.0	19.94
11	"The Birthday Synchronicity"	December 15, 2016	3.4/13	15.96	2.0	5.30	5.4	21.26
12	"The Holiday Summation"	January 5, 2017	3.6/13	16.80	1.9	5.15	5.5	21.96
13	"The Romance Recalibration"	January 19, 2017	3.4/13	15.15	1.9	4.96	5.3	20.11
14	"The Emotion Detection Automation"	February 2, 2017	3.1/12	14.66	1.7	4.66	4.8	19.32
15	"The Locomotion Reverberation"	February 9, 2017	3.0/12	14.15	1.8	5.10	4.8	19.24
16	"The Allowance Evaporation"	February 16, 2017	2.8/10	13.51	1.5	4.12	4.3	17.63
17	"The Comic-Con Conundrum"	February 23, 2017	2.8/11	13.38	1.8	4.94	4.6	18.32
18	"The Escape Hatch Identification"	March 9, 2017	2.8/11	13.04	1.9	4.91	4.7	17.95
19	"The Collaboration Fluctuation"	March 30, 2017	2.6/11	12.78	1.6	4.40	4.2	17.18
20	"The Recollection Dissipation"	April 6, 2017	2.7/11	12.59	1.5	4.51	4.2	17.11
21	"The Separation Agitation"	April 13, 2017	2.5/9	11.89	1.7	4.60	4.2	16.49
22	"The Cognition Regeneration"	April 27, 2017	2.6/11	12.52	1.3	3.72	3.9	16.23
23	"The Gyroscopic Collapse"	May 4, 2017	2.5/11	12.39	1.5	4.18	4.0	16.57
24	"The Long Distance Dissonance"	May 11, 2017	2.7/11	12.99	1.8	4.96	4.5	17.95
