= The Comic Book Store Regeneration =

- The Big Bang Theory episode
- Episode no.: Season 8 Episode 15
- Directed by: Mark Cendrowski
- Story by: Jim Reynolds & Maria Ferrari and Jeremy Howe
- Teleplay by: Steven Molaro, Steve Holland and Eric Kaplan
- Original air date: February 19, 2015

Guest appearance
- Nathan Fillion as himself

Episode chronology
← Previous "The Troll Manifestation"	Next → "The Intimacy Acceleration"
- The Big Bang Theory (season 8)

"The Comic Book Store Regeneration" is the fifteenth episode of the eighth season of The Big Bang Theory, which first aired on CBS on February 19, 2015. It is the 174th episode overall. "The Comic Book Store Regeneration" is dedicated to Carol Ann Susi, who played Howard's mother, Debbie Wolowitz.

== Plot ==
Barry Kripke stops by to thank Amy for helping him with her ideas on string theory, which bothers Sheldon because she never helped him out when he was working on it. He complains to Penny who tells him to "let it go". Instead, Sheldon reveals that Amy was secretly performing experiments on Penny and Leonard and comparing the results with those of a chimpanzee, infuriating Penny. Leonard and Raj run into Nathan Fillion (playing himself) at a deli, but he denies he is an actor so he can eat in peace. Later, he admits who he is and offers to take a selfie with them. Raj asks so many questions to verify Fillion's identity that he looks annoyed in the photo. Stuart has opened his new comic book store, which impresses everyone except Howard who finds him using the den furniture that his mother had given him. However, all arguments end when Howard gets a call from Florida where his mother is visiting, and receives news that she died in her sleep. Everyone, including Sheldon who knows how it feels to lose a parent, goes to comfort Howard. After he and Bernadette leave for Florida, the rest of the gang remember and toast the death of Mrs. Wolowitz, calling her "a loving mother to all of them".

== Reception ==
Schedeen of IGN gave the episode a rating of 8.2 out of 10. Schedeen stated; "The Big Bang Theory delivered an awkwardly structured but emotional farewell to the late Mrs. Wolowitz." Kyle Fowle of The A.V. Club gave the episode a B rating.
