= Wayne Wilderson =

American actor (born 1966)

- Born: January 30, 1966 (age 60); Minneapolis, Minnesota, U.S.
- Education: Boston College
- Occupation: Actor
- Years active: 1993–present
- Website: www.waynewilderson.com

Wayne Henry Wilderson (born January 30, 1966) is an American actor. He has appeared on several television programs as a guest actor.

== Early life and education ==
Wilderson was born in Minneapolis, Minnesota, to Frank and Ida-Lorraine Wilderson, both psychologists. He graduated from Breck School in 1984 and received a Bachelor of Arts in theatre arts from Boston College in 1989.

== Career ==
Wilderson has appeared on episodes of How to Get Away with Murder, Mom, Bones, CSI: Vegas, The Office, Seinfeld, Mr. Show, The Steve Harvey Show, Two and a Half Men, and The Big Bang Theory. He appeared in the unsold pilot episode for a U.S. adaptation of Armando Iannucci’s The Thick of It as a political blogger; he later appeared in several episodes of Iannucci’s U.S. political satire Veep. He also made a cameo in Evan Almighty.

Wilderson has also appeared in commercials for companies including Popeyes Chicken, MasterCard, Circuit City, Avis, Fruit of the Loom (portraying the purple grape cluster), Reebok, Yahoo! HotJobs, Toyota, Chevrolet, Washington Mutual, Mitsubishi, Wendy's, Sealy, PlayStation Portable, and Corona Extra, amongst others.

== Filmography ==
=== Film ===
| Year | Title | Role | Notes |
|---|---|---|---|
| 1996 | Independence Day | Jim the Area 51 Technician | |
| 1996 | 364 Girls a Year | Cats | |
| 2001 | Monkeybone | Hutch | |
| 2001 | A.I. Artificial Intelligence | Comedian | |
| 2002 | One Hour Photo | Booking Clerk | Uncredited |
| 2006 | The Enigma with a Stigma | Todd Harvey | |
| 2009 | Space Buddies | Tad Thompson | |
| 2014 | The Cobbler | Young Preppy Man | |
| 2015 | Sex, Death and Bowling | Ben Kingston | |
| 2016 | Mascots | Dr. Harper James | |
| 2020 | Bottle Monster | Exterminator | |
| 2021 | Far More | Ben Kingston | |
| 2021 | My Babysitter the Super Hero | Saphire Jones | |
| 2022 | Trust | Travis | |
| 2026 | The Dink | Gene | |

=== Television ===
| Year | Title | Role | Notes |
|---|---|---|---|
| 1993 | Frasier | Teddy | Episode: "Oops" |
| 1994 | Thunder Alley | Mike | Episode: "The Prototype" |
| 1995 | Mad About You | Bank Executive | Episode: "The Parking Space" |
| 1995, 1997 | Almost Perfect | Jerry / Waiter | 2 episodes |
| 1996 | Ellen | Ronnie Williams | Episode: "Oh, Sweet Rapture" |
| 1996 | Living Single | Carvin Edmonds | Episode: "Not Quite Mr. Right" |
| 1996 | Mr. Show with Bob and David | Various characters | Episode: "Operation Hell on Earth" |
| 1997 | NewsRadio | OSHA Guy | Episode: "The Injury" |
| 1997 | Silk Stalkings | Officer Foxy | Episode: "The Wedge" |
| 1997–1998 | Seinfeld | Walter | 4 episodes |
| 1998 | Getting Personal | James | Episode: "The Wedding Zinger" |
| 1998 | Malcolm & Eddie | Jake | Episode: "Teed Off" |
| 1998–2001 | The Steve Harvey Show | Byron Clark | 5 episodes |
| 1999 | Crusade | Kevin Sprach | Episode: "Appearances and Other Deceits" |
| 2000 | The West Wing | Senator's Aide | Episode: "The Lame Duck Congress" |
| 2000 | The Jamie Foxx Show | Garnett | Episode: "Shakin' and Fakin'" |
| 2001 | V.I.P. | Agent Keller | Episode: "Aqua Valva" |
| 2001 | The Ellen Show | Bob Wyler | Episode: "Joe" |
| 2001–2009 | CSI: Crime Scene Investigation | Paramedic / Coroner | 6 episodes |
| 2002 | Any Day Now | Dave Bayer | Episode: "In Too Deep" |
| 2002 | The Parkers | Lewis | Episode: "To Love or Not to Love" |
| 2002 | Malcolm in the Middle | Hotel Clerk | Episode: "Hal's Birthday" |
| 2003 | JAG | Dr. Stoudamire | Episode: "Complications" |
| 2003 | The King of Queens | Patrick | Episode: "Golden Moldy" |
| 2003 | Windy City Heat | Nicola Sacco | Television film |
| 2004 | Threat Matrix | Ellis | Episode: "Mexico" |
| 2004 | Married to the Kellys | Al | Episode: "Tom Doesn't Get It" |
| 2004 | One on One | Evan | Episode: "Splitting Hairs" |
| 2004 | Joey | Director #2 | Episode: "Pilot" |
| 2004 | Half & Half | Ernie | Episode: "The Big One Wedding and a Funeral Episode" |
| 2004 | Grounded for Life | Interviewer | Episode: "Mystery Dance" |
| 2004 | Boston Legal | Attorney Paul Phillips | Episode: "Loose Lips" |
| 2005 | Listen Up | Alan | Episode: "Tony Whine-Man" |
| 2005 | Grey's Anatomy | Billy Adams | Episode: "Who's Zoomin' Who?" |
| 2005 | CSI: Miami | Dr. Stern | Episode: "Nailed" |
| 2006 | Still Standing | Referee | Episode: "Still Coaching" |
| 2006 | Lucky Louie | Priest | Episode: "Confession" |
| 2006 | The Office | Martin Nash | 2 episodes |
| 2006–2007 | The Class | Joel | 3 episodes |
| 2007 | The Thick of It | Taylor | Unsold pilot |
| 2007 | Cavemen | Allan, co-worker | Episode: "Nick Jerk, Andy Work" |
| 2007–2013 | Two and a Half Men | Dad / Roger | 3 episodes |
| 2008 | Hannah Montana | Officer DiAria | Episode: "Ready, Set, Don't Drive" |
| 2009 | Pushing Daisies | Wendell Featherstone | Episode: "Window Dressed to Kill" |
| 2009 | ER | Dr. Claypool | Episode: "Old Time" |
| 2009 | 3Way | Trent | Episode: "LadyCops: Brotherly Love" |
| 2009 | Private Practice | Neil Delhom | Episode: "Sins of the Father" |
| 2011 | Wilfred | Charlie | Episode: "Isolation" |
| 2011 | Bones | Ralph Berti | Episode: "The Mail in the Mall" |
| 2013 | Melissa & Joey | Jamie | Episode: "Family Feud" |
| 2014 | Mom | Dr. Butler | 2 episodes |
| 2014 | Review | Ron | Episode: "Quitting; Last Day; Irish" |
| 2014 | Jessie | Kevin Randolf | Episode: "Jessie's Aloha Holidays with Parker and Joey" |
| 2014–2015 | A to Z | Dane | 3 episodes |
| 2015 | How to Get Away with Murder | Jeremy Eastham | 2 episodes |
| 2015 | Club 5150 | Ted | 5 episodes |
| 2015 | The Big Bang Theory | Travis | Episode: "The Platonic Permutation" |
| 2016 | The Middle | Principal Carson | Episode: "The Show Must Go On" |
| 2016 | Angie Tribeca | Sousa | Episode: "Contains Graphic Designer Violence" |
| 2016 | Son of Zorn | Stephen | Episode: "The War of the Workplace" |
| 2016–2019 | Veep | Wayne | 9 episodes |
| 2017–2018 | The Mick | Principal Gibbons | 7 episodes |
| 2018 | The Fosters | Scott | Episode: "Turks & Caicos" |
| 2018 | Mr. Student Body President | Eric Rice | 2 episodes |
| 2018 | I Was A Teenage Pillow Queen | Chuck | Television film |
| 2019 | Young Sheldon | Dr. Gilbert | Episode: "A Tummy Ache and a Whale of a Metaphor" |
| 2019 | RelationFixTM | Kyle | Episode: "Touched by a New Best Friend" |
| 2020 | Will & Grace | Ellis Palmer-Payne | Episode: "Of Mouse and Men" |
| 2020 | The Big Show Show | Xavier McDaniels | Episode: "The Big Brain" |
| 2020 | Upload | Zach | 2 episodes |
| 2023 | The Last Thing He Told Me | Mr. Karschner | Episode: "Protect Her" |
| 2025 | Abbott Elementary | Rick the auditor | Episodes: "Audit" and "Rally" |
