= Carol Ann Susi =

American actress (1952–2014)

- Publicity Photo of Carol Ann Susi
- Born: February 2, 1952; New York City, New York, U.S.
- Died: November 11, 2014 (aged 62); Los Angeles, California, U.S.
- Resting place: St. Charles / Resurrection Cemeteries, East Farmingdale, New York U.S.
- Occupation: Actress
- Years active: 1974–2014

Carol Ann Susi (February 2, 1952 – November 11, 2014) was an American actress. With a career spanning 40 years, she debuted as the recurring character of semi-competent but likable intern Monique Marmelstein on Kolchak: The Night Stalker. Susi's level of celebrity was elevated for having provided the voice of recurring off-screen character Mrs. Wolowitz, mother of Howard Wolowitz, on the CBS sitcom The Big Bang Theory (2007–2019), until her death in 2014.

== Career ==
Susi made her first on-screen appearance in Kolchak: The Night Stalker, where she played the recurring role of news service intern Monique Marmelstein. Other television and film credits included: McMillan & Wife, Coyote Ugly, Just Go with It, The Big Bang Theory, Cheers, Becker, Something So Right, Generations, the 1990 biker comedy Masters of Menace, Grey's Anatomy, That '70s Show, Out of Practice, Cats & Dogs, Just Shoot Me, Married... with Children, Night Court, The King of Queens, Death Becomes Her, NYPD Blue, Seinfeld, The Secret of My Success, My Blue Heaven, and Sabrina, the Teenage Witch. She also had extensive experience in live theatre and voiced a character on the video game adaptation of CSI: NY.

== Personal life ==
Susi was born in Brooklyn, New York, in 1952 to an Italian-American family. She graduated from Franklin Delano Roosevelt High School in Brooklyn in 1970. She studied acting at HB Studio in New York City before moving to Los Angeles in the 1970s.

== Death ==
Susi died of cancer on November 11, 2014, in Los Angeles, California, at age 62. She had been diagnosed a week before her death. She is interred at the Saint Charles Cemetery in East Farmingdale, New York. Her character on The Big Bang Theory, Mrs. Wolowitz, was mourned after the character died in the series' eighth-season episode "The Comic Book Store Regeneration" broadcast on February 19, 2015. The characters toast to her in an uncharacteristically somber ending, in homage to Susi.

== Filmography ==
=== Film ===
Film
Year	Title	Role	Notes
1984	Love Scenes	Susan	
1987	Outrageous Fortune	Receptionist	
1987	The Secret of My Success	Jean	Credited as Carol-Ann Susi
1989	Blood Red	Segestra Daughter #1	
1989	Wedding Band	Angela	
1989	Sea of Love	Additional voice	
1990	My Blue Heaven	Filomena	
1990	Masters of Menace	Candy Colletti	
1992	Death Becomes Her	Psychiatric Patient	
1993	Under Investigation	Neighbor	
1996	Qiana	Waitress	Short film
1996	Edie & Pen	Irma	
1996	Wedding Bell Blues	Aunt Anash	
1996	The Cottonwood		
1997	Eat Your Heart Out	Cynthia	
1998	Mafia!	Clamato's Wife	
1998	Waiting for Woody		Short film
2000	The Amati Girls	Ticket Seller	
2000	Tempest Eye	Monique	
2001	Cats & Dogs	Sophie's Sister	
2002	Duty Dating	Seminar Woman	
2006	Coffee Date	Diana's Assistant	
2008	Red Velvet	Mother	
2011	Just Go with It	Mrs. Maccabee	
2014	A Life, Taken	Ms. Mancuso	Short film Final film role

=== Television ===
Television
Year	Title	Role	Notes
1974	Kolchak: The Night Stalker	Monique Marmelstein	3 episodes
1974	Crackle of Death	Monique Marmelstein	TV movie Segment: "Firefall"
1975	McCoy		Episode 1: "The Big Ripoff
1975	McMillan & Wife	Luana / Waitress not Laura	2 episodes Uncredited - 1 episode
1976	Rich Man, Poor Man	Waitress	Episode: "Part V: Chapter 7"
1981	Leave 'em Laughing	Gina	TV movie
1987	My Sister Sam	Marsha Hammer	Season 1 episode 14: "Go Crazy"
1987	Simon & Simon	Doreen	Carol-Ann Susi; Season 7 episode 1: "New Cop in Town"
1987	Jake and the Fatman	Sally	Credited as Carolann Susi; Season 1 episode 11: "Have Yourself a Merry Little Christmas"
1989	Married to the Mob	Marilyn	TV short
1989	Who's the Boss?	Ginger	Season 6 episode 3: "In Your Dreams"
1989-1990	Generations	Thelma	8 episodes Credit only - 5 episodes
1990	Growing Pains	Norma	Season 5 episode 16: "The Home Show"
1990	Night Court	Mara Bernstein	Season 7 episode 21: "My Three Dads"
1990	Head of the Class	Nurse Lemas	Season 5 episode 7: "Billy's Big One"
1990	Adam-12	Vicki	Also known as The New Adam-12; Season 1 episode 6: "Vigilante"
1990	Married People	Gloria	Episode 9: "Term Paper"
1990	Doner	Berlinetti	TV movie
1990–1993	Murphy Brown	Woman Checker / Secretary #37	2 episodes
1991	Cheers	Angeline	Season 9 episode 13: "Honor Thy Mother
1991	Doogie Howser, M.D.	Psychic	Season 2 episode 23: "Doogie's Wager"
1992	Seinfeld	Carrie	Episode: "The Boyfriend"
1992	Bob	Debra	Season 1 episode 6: "P.C. or Not P.C."
1992	A Different World	Desk Sergeant	Season 6 episode 10: "Faith, Hope, and Charity: Part 2"
1992	Mad About You	Female Passenger	2 episodes Uncredited - 1 episode (clip show)
1993	Blossom	Nun	Season 3 episode 19: "The Best Laid Plans of Mice and Men"
1993	Good Advice	Patient	Season 1 episode 4: "The Kiss"
1994	NYPD Blue	Connie	Season 1 episode 14: "Jumpin' Jack Fleishman"
1994	Big Daddy's Barbeque	Deirdre	TV movie
1995	Pointman	Pageant Director Miss Sloane	Season 2 episode 7: "Here She Comes, Miss Murder"
1995–1996	Married... with Children	Frannie	3 episodes
1996	The Home Court	Connie	Episode 11: "Touched by an Anger"
1996	ER	Pregnant Alien-Abductee	Season 2 episode 15: "Baby Shower"
1996–1997	Something So Right	Gracie/Grace	8 episodes
1997	Fired Up	Meat Selling Woman	Season 1 episode 1: "Pilot"
1998	Just Shoot Me!	Mrs. Boukidis	Season 2 episode 13: "Pass the Salt"
1998	Oh Baby	Felicia	Season 1 episode 2: "Picking a Donor"
1998	Sabrina, the Teenage Witch	Doris	Season 3 episode 1: "It's a Mad Mad Mad Mad Season Opener"
1998	Becker	Mrs. Marino	Season 1 episode 2: "Take These Pills and Shove 'Em"
1998	USA High	Mrs. Lazzarini	Season 1 episode 75: "Goodbye Lazz"
1999	Happily Ever After: Fairy Tales for Every Child	Third Pigeon	Voice; Season 3 episode 5: "The Happy Prince"
2000	City Guys	Surly Woman	Season 4 episode 18: "Who Da Man?"
2000-2005	The King of Queens	Service Counter Manager / Ms. Deluca	2 episodes
2001	Rude Awakening	Brandy	Season 3 episode 19: "Dawg Daze Afternoon"
2001	That's Life	Tessie Dalton	Season 1 episode 18: "Miracle at the Cucina"
2001	Six Feet Under	Pauline Romano	Season 1 episode 3: "The Foot"
2004	Just Desserts	Mrs. Guzzi	TV movie
2004	The Drew Carey Show	Doris	Season 9 episode 20: "Liar Liar House on Fire"
2005	McBride: It's Murder, Madam	Helen	TV movie
2005	Out of Practice	Susy	2 episodes
2006	Love, Inc.	Gwen	Episode 13: "Grace Under Fire"
2006	That '70s Show	"Wake Up Wisconsin!" Receptionist	2 episodes
2007	Journeyman		Episode 7: "Double Down"
2007–2014; 2017	The Big Bang Theory	Debbie Wolowitz	40 episodes
2008	Ugly Betty	Mrs. Galeano	
2008	Grey's Anatomy	Mrs. Borsokowski	Season 5 episode 4: "Brave New World"
2010	'Til Death	Marjorie Putnam	Season 4 episode 12: "Snore Loser"
2012	Robot and Monster	Katie	Season 2 episode 3: "How to Train Your Marf/Blinking Light"
2019	Young Sheldon	Debbie Wolowitz	Voice; Archived recording Season 2 episode 22: "A Swedish Science Thing and the Equation for Toast"

=== Video games ===
Video games
Year	Title	Role	Notes
2008	CSI: NY	Doris Brown / Pamela Ross	Voice
2010	Mafia II	Cleaning Lady / Maria Agnello	Voice
