= List of The Big Bang Theory episodes =

The Big Bang Theory logo.

The Big Bang Theory is an American television sitcom created and executively produced by Chuck Lorre and Bill Prady for CBS. Like the name of the series itself (with the exception of the first episode, "Pilot"), episode titles of The Big Bang Theory always start with "The" and resemble the name of a scientific principle, theory or experiment, whimsically referencing a plot point or quirk in that episode.

During the course of the series, 279 episodes of The Big Bang Theory aired, between September 24, 2007, and May 16, 2019. All seasons and episodes have been released on DVD, Blu-ray, and HBO Max.

== Series overview ==
Season	Episodes	Originally released		Viewers rank	U.S. Viewers (millions)	18–49 rank	18–49 rating/share
Season	Episodes	First released	Last released	Viewers rank	U.S. Viewers (millions)	18–49 rank	18–49 rating/share
1	17	September 24, 2007	May 19, 2008	68	8.34	46	3.3/8
2	23	September 22, 2008	May 11, 2009	40	10.07	22	3.8
3	23	September 21, 2009	May 24, 2010	12	14.22	5	5.3/13
4	24	September 23, 2010	May 19, 2011	13	13.21	7	4.4/13
5	24	September 22, 2011	May 10, 2012	8	15.82	6	5.5/17
6	24	September 27, 2012	May 16, 2013	3	18.68	2	6.2/19
7	24	September 26, 2013	May 15, 2014	2	19.96	2	6.2/20
8	24	September 22, 2014	May 7, 2015	2	19.05	4	5.6/17
9	24	September 21, 2015	May 12, 2016	2	20.36	3	5.8/19
10	24	September 19, 2016	May 11, 2017	2	18.99	3	4.9/19
11	24	September 25, 2017	May 10, 2018	1	18.63	5	4.4
12	24	September 24, 2018	May 16, 2019	2	17.31	6	3.6

== Episodes ==
=== Season 1 (2007–08) ===
No. overall	No. in season	Title	Directed by	Written by	Original release date	Prod. code	U.S. viewers (millions)
1	1	"Pilot"	James Burrows	Chuck Lorre & Bill Prady	September 24, 2007	276023	9.52
2	2	"The Big Bran Hypothesis"	Mark Cendrowski	Story by : Chuck Lorre & Bill Prady; Teleplay by : Robert Cohen & Dave Goetsch	October 1, 2007	3T6601	8.50
3	3	"The Fuzzy Boots Corollary"	Mark Cendrowski	Story by : Chuck Lorre; Teleplay by : Bill Prady & Steven Molaro	October 8, 2007	3T6602	8.35
4	4	"The Luminous Fish Effect"	Mark Cendrowski	Story by : Chuck Lorre & Bill Prady; Teleplay by : David Litt & Lee Aronsohn	October 15, 2007	3T6603	7.94
5	5	"The Hamburger Postulate"	Andrew D. Weyman	Story by : Jennifer Glickman & Hart Hanson; Teleplay by : Dave Goetsch & Steven Molaro	October 22, 2007	3T6604	8.81
6	6	"The Middle-earth Paradigm"	Mark Cendrowski	Story by : Dave Goetsch; Teleplay by : David Litt & Robert Cohen	October 29, 2007	3T6605	8.41
7	7	"The Dumpling Paradox"	Mark Cendrowski	Story by : Chuck Lorre & Bill Prady; Teleplay by : Lee Aronsohn & Jennifer Glickman	November 5, 2007	3T6606	9.37
8	8	"The Grasshopper Experiment"	Ted Wass	Story by : Dave Goetsch & Steven Molaro; Teleplay by : Lee Aronsohn & Robert Cohen	November 12, 2007	3T6607	9.32
9	9	"The Cooper-Hofstadter Polarization"	Joel Murray	Story by : Bill Prady & Stephen Engel; Teleplay by : Chuck Lorre & Lee Aronsohn & Dave Goetsch	March 17, 2008	3T6608	8.93
10	10	"The Loobenfeld Decay"	Mark Cendrowski	Story by : Chuck Lorre & Bill Prady; Teleplay by : Bill Prady & Lee Aronsohn	March 24, 2008	3T6609	8.53
11	11	"The Pancake Batter Anomaly"	Mark Cendrowski	Story by : Chuck Lorre & Lee Aronsohn; Teleplay by : Bill Prady & Stephen Engel	March 31, 2008	3T6610	8.44
12	12	"The Jerusalem Duality"	Mark Cendrowski	Story by : Jennifer Glickman & Stephen Engel; Teleplay by : Dave Goetsch & Steven Molaro	April 14, 2008	3T6611	7.63
13	13	"The Bat Jar Conjecture"	Mark Cendrowski	Story by : Stephen Engel & Jennifer Glickman; Teleplay by : Bill Prady & Robert Cohen	April 21, 2008	3T6612	7.39
14	14	"The Nerdvana Annihilation"	Mark Cendrowski	Story by : Bill Prady; Teleplay by : Stephen Engel & Steven Molaro	April 28, 2008	3T6613	8.07
15	15	"The Pork Chop Indeterminacy"	Mark Cendrowski	Story by : Chuck Lorre; Teleplay by : Lee Aronsohn & Bill Prady	May 5, 2008	3T6614	7.38
16	16	"The Peanut Reaction"	Mark Cendrowski	Story by : Bill Prady & Lee Aronsohn; Teleplay by : Dave Goetsch & Steven Molaro	May 12, 2008	3T6615	7.79
17	17	"The Tangerine Factor"	Mark Cendrowski	Story by : Chuck Lorre & Bill Prady; Teleplay by : Lee Aronsohn & Steven Molaro	May 19, 2008	3T6616	7.34

=== Season 2 (2008–09) ===
No. overall	No. in season	Title	Directed by	Written by	Original release date	Prod. code	U.S. viewers (millions)
18	1	"The Bad Fish Paradigm"	Mark Cendrowski	Story by : Bill Prady; Teleplay by : Dave Goetsch & Steven Molaro	September 22, 2008	3T7351	9.32
19	2	"The Codpiece Topology"	Mark Cendrowski	Story by : Chuck Lorre; Teleplay by : Bill Prady & Lee Aronsohn	September 29, 2008	3T7352	8.60
20	3	"The Barbarian Sublimation"	Mark Cendrowski	Story by : Nicole Lorre; Teleplay by : Steven Molaro & Eric Kaplan	October 6, 2008	3T7353	9.39
21	4	"The Griffin Equivalency"	Mark Cendrowski	Story by : Bill Prady & Chuck Lorre; Teleplay by : Stephen Engel & Tim Doyle	October 13, 2008	3T7354	9.34
22	5	"The Euclid Alternative"	Mark Cendrowski	Story by : Bill Prady & Steven Molaro; Teleplay by : Lee Aronsohn & Dave Goetsch	October 20, 2008	3T7355	9.33
23	6	"The Cooper–Nowitzki Theorem"	Mark Cendrowski	Story by : Stephen Engel & Daley Haggar; Teleplay by : Tim Doyle & Richard Rosenstock	November 3, 2008	3T7356	9.67
24	7	"The Panty Piñata Polarization"	Mark Cendrowski	Story by : Bill Prady & Tim Doyle; Teleplay by : Jennifer Glickman & Steven Molaro	November 10, 2008	3T7357	10.01
25	8	"The Lizard–Spock Expansion"	Mark Cendrowski	Story by : Bill Prady & Hart Hanson; Teleplay by : Dave Goetsch & Jennifer Glickman	November 17, 2008	3T7358	9.76
26	9	"The White Asparagus Triangulation"	Mark Cendrowski	Story by : Dave Goetsch & Steven Molaro; Teleplay by : Stephen Engel & Richard Rosenstock	November 24, 2008	3T7359	10.03
27	10	"The Vartabedian Conundrum"	Mark Cendrowski	Story by : Chuck Lorre & Steven Molaro; Teleplay by : Bill Prady & Richard Rosenstock	December 8, 2008	3T7360	10.50
28	11	"The Bath Item Gift Hypothesis"	Mark Cendrowski	Story by : Bill Prady & Richard Rosenstock; Teleplay by : Stephen Engel & Eric Kaplan	December 15, 2008	3T7361	11.22
29	12	"The Killer Robot Instability"	Mark Cendrowski	Story by : Bill Prady & Richard Rosenstock; Teleplay by : Steven Molaro & Daley Haggar	January 12, 2009	3T7362	11.81
30	13	"The Friendship Algorithm"	Mark Cendrowski	Story by : Bill Prady & Richard Rosenstock; Teleplay by : Chuck Lorre & Steven Molaro	January 19, 2009	3T7363	11.03
31	14	"The Financial Permeability"	Mark Cendrowski	Story by : Chuck Lorre & Steven Molaro; Teleplay by : Richard Rosenstock & Eric Kaplan	February 2, 2009	3T7364	10.84
32	15	"The Maternal Capacitance"	Mark Cendrowski	Story by : Chuck Lorre & Bill Prady; Teleplay by : Richard Rosenstock & Steven Molaro	February 9, 2009	3T7365	12.72
33	16	"The Cushion Saturation"	Mark Cendrowski	Story by : Chuck Lorre; Teleplay by : Bill Prady & Lee Aronsohn	March 2, 2009	3T7366	10.83
34	17	"The Terminator Decoupling"	Mark Cendrowski	Story by : Bill Prady & Dave Goetsch & Hart Hanson; Teleplay by : Tim Doyle & Stephen Engel	March 9, 2009	3T7367	9.47
35	18	"The Work Song Nanocluster"	Peter Chakos	Story by : Bill Prady & Lee Aronsohn; Teleplay by : Dave Goetsch & Richard Rosenstock	March 16, 2009	3T7368	9.69
36	19	"The Dead Hooker Juxtaposition"	Mark Cendrowski	Steven Molaro	March 30, 2009	3T7369	9.74
37	20	"The Hofstadter Isotope"	Mark Cendrowski	Dave Goetsch	April 13, 2009	3T7370	10.06
38	21	"The Vegas Renormalization"	Mark Cendrowski	Story by : Jessica Ambrosetti & Nicole Lorre & Andrew Roth; Teleplay by : Steven Molaro	April 27, 2009	3T7371	9.24
39	22	"The Classified Materials Turbulence"	Mark Cendrowski	Story by : Chuck Lorre & Lee Aronsohn; Teleplay by : Bill Prady & Steven Molaro	May 4, 2009	3T7373	9.25
40	23	"The Monopolar Expedition"	Mark Cendrowski	Eric Kaplan & Richard Rosenstock	May 11, 2009	3T7372	9.76

=== Season 3 (2009–10) ===
No. overall	No. in season	Title	Directed by	Written by	Original release date	Prod. code	U.S. viewers (millions)
41	1	"The Electric Can Opener Fluctuation"	Mark Cendrowski	Story by : Bill Prady, Lee Aronsohn & Steve Holland; Teleplay by : Chuck Lorre, Jim Reynolds & Steven Molaro	September 21, 2009	3X5551	12.96
42	2	"The Jiminy Conjecture"	Mark Cendrowski	Jim Reynolds	September 28, 2009	3X5552	13.27
43	3	"The Gothowitz Deviation"	Mark Cendrowski	Story by : Lee Aronsohn & Richard Rosenstock; Teleplay by : Bill Prady & Maria Ferrari	October 5, 2009	3X5553	12.52
44	4	"The Pirate Solution"	Mark Cendrowski	Steve Holland	October 12, 2009	3X5554	13.07
45	5	"The Creepy Candy Coating Corollary"	Mark Cendrowski	Story by : Chuck Lorre & Bill Prady; Teleplay by : Lee Aronsohn & Steven Molaro	October 19, 2009	3X5556	13.47
46	6	"The Cornhusker Vortex"	Mark Cendrowski	Story by : Bill Prady & Steven Molaro; Teleplay by : Dave Goetsch & Richard Rosenstock	November 2, 2009	3X5555	12.73
47	7	"The Guitarist Amplification"	Mark Cendrowski	Story by : Chuck Lorre & Lee Aronsohn; Teleplay by : Bill Prady & Richard Rosenstock & Jim Reynolds	November 9, 2009	3X5557	12.80
48	8	"The Adhesive Duck Deficiency"	Mark Cendrowski	Story by : Chuck Lorre & Bill Prady & Dave Goetsch; Teleplay by : Steven Molaro & Eric Kaplan & Maria Ferrari	November 16, 2009	3X5558	13.23
49	9	"The Vengeance Formulation"	Mark Cendrowski	Story by : Chuck Lorre & Maria Ferrari; Teleplay by : Richard Rosenstock & Jim Reynolds & Steve Holland	November 23, 2009	3X5559	14.13
50	10	"The Gorilla Experiment"	Mark Cendrowski	Story by : Chuck Lorre & Richard Rosenstock & Steve Holland; Teleplay by : Bill Prady & Steven Molaro & Maria Ferrari	December 7, 2009	3X5560	14.38
51	11	"The Maternal Congruence"	Mark Cendrowski	Story by : Lee Aronsohn & Steven Molaro & Richard Rosenstock & Maria Ferrari; Teleplay by : Chuck Lorre & Bill Prady & Dave Goetsch	December 14, 2009	3X5562	15.58
52	12	"The Psychic Vortex"	Mark Cendrowski	Story by : Lee Aronsohn & Steven Molaro; Teleplay by : Chuck Lorre & Eric Kaplan & Jim Reynolds	January 11, 2010	3X5561	15.82
53	13	"The Bozeman Reaction"	Mark Cendrowski	Story by : Bill Prady & Lee Aronsohn & Jim Reynolds; Teleplay by : Chuck Lorre & Steven Molaro & Steve Holland	January 18, 2010	3X5563	15.05
54	14	"The Einstein Approximation"	Mark Cendrowski	Story by : Lee Aronsohn & Dave Goetsch & Steve Holland; Teleplay by : Chuck Lorre & Steven Molaro & Eric Kaplan	February 1, 2010	3X5565	15.51
55	15	"The Large Hadron Collision"	Mark Cendrowski	Story by : Chuck Lorre & Steven Molaro & Jim Reynolds; Teleplay by : Lee Aronsohn & Richard Rosenstock & Maria Ferrari	February 8, 2010	3X5564	16.26
56	16	"The Excelsior Acquisition"	Peter Chakos	Story by : Chuck Lorre & Lee Aronsohn & Steven Molaro; Teleplay by : Bill Prady & Steve Holland & Maria Ferrari	March 1, 2010	3X5566	15.73
57	17	"The Precious Fragmentation"	Mark Cendrowski	Story by : Lee Aronsohn & Eric Kaplan & Maria Ferrari; Teleplay by : Bill Prady & Steven Molaro & Richard Rosenstock	March 8, 2010	3X5567	16.32
58	18	"The Pants Alternative"	Mark Cendrowski	Story by : Chuck Lorre & Bill Prady & Steve Holland; Teleplay by : Eric Kaplan & Richard Rosenstock & Jim Reynolds	March 22, 2010	3X5568	13.42
59	19	"The Wheaton Recurrence"	Mark Cendrowski	Story by : Chuck Lorre & Steven Molaro & Nicole Lorre & Jessica Ambrosetti; Teleplay by : Bill Prady & Dave Goetsch & Jim Reynolds & Maria Ferrari	April 12, 2010	3X5569	13.39
60	20	"The Spaghetti Catalyst"	Anthony Rich	Chuck Lorre & Bill Prady & Lee Aronsohn & Steven Molaro	May 3, 2010	3X5570	11.63
61	21	"The Plimpton Stimulation"	Mark Cendrowski	Story by : Chuck Lorre & Bill Prady & Lee Aronsohn; Teleplay by : Steven Molaro & Jim Reynolds & Maria Ferrari	May 10, 2010	3X5571	13.73
62	22	"The Staircase Implementation"	Mark Cendrowski	Story by : Lee Aronsohn & Steven Molaro & Steve Holland; Teleplay by : Chuck Lorre & Dave Goetsch & Maria Ferrari	May 17, 2010	3X5572	15.02
63	23	"The Lunar Excitation"	Peter Chakos	Story by : Chuck Lorre & Bill Prady & Maria Ferrari; Teleplay by : Lee Aronsohn & Steven Molaro & Steve Holland	May 24, 2010	3X5573	15.02

=== Season 4 (2010–11) ===
No. overall	No. in season	Title	Directed by	Written by	Original release date	Prod. code	U.S. viewers (millions)
64	1	"The Robotic Manipulation"	Mark Cendrowski	Story by : Chuck Lorre & Lee Aronsohn & Dave Goetsch; Teleplay by : Steven Molaro & Eric Kaplan & Steve Holland	September 23, 2010	3X6651	14.04
65	2	"The Cruciferous Vegetable Amplification"	Mark Cendrowski	Story by : Bill Prady & Lee Aronsohn & Steve Holland; Teleplay by : Chuck Lorre & Steven Molaro & Jim Reynolds	September 30, 2010	3X6652	13.05
66	3	"The Zazzy Substitution"	Mark Cendrowski	Story by : Chuck Lorre & Bill Prady & Jim Reynolds; Teleplay by : Lee Aronsohn & Steven Molaro & Maria Ferrari	October 7, 2010	3X6653	12.59
67	4	"The Hot Troll Deviation"	Mark Cendrowski	Story by : Chuck Lorre & Steven Molaro & Adam Faberman; Teleplay by : Bill Prady & Lee Aronsohn & Maria Ferrari	October 14, 2010	3X6654	12.57
68	5	"The Desperation Emanation"	Mark Cendrowski	Story by : Bill Prady & Lee Aronsohn & Dave Goetsch; Teleplay by : Chuck Lorre & Steven Molaro & Steve Holland	October 21, 2010	3X6655	13.05
69	6	"The Irish Pub Formulation"	Mark Cendrowski	Story by : Chuck Lorre & Lee Aronsohn & Steven Molaro; Teleplay by : Bill Prady & Eric Kaplan & Maria Ferrari	October 28, 2010	3X6656	13.04
70	7	"The Apology Insufficiency"	Mark Cendrowski	Story by : Chuck Lorre & Lee Aronsohn & Maria Ferrari; Teleplay by : Bill Prady & Steven Molaro & Steve Holland	November 4, 2010	3X6657	14.00
71	8	"The 21-Second Excitation"	Mark Cendrowski	Story by : Chuck Lorre & Bill Prady & Jim Reynolds; Teleplay by : Lee Aronsohn & Steven Molaro & Steve Holland	November 11, 2010	3X6658	13.11
72	9	"The Boyfriend Complexity"	Mark Cendrowski	Story by : Chuck Lorre & Lee Aronsohn & Jim Reynolds; Teleplay by : Bill Prady & Steven Molaro & Dave Goetsch	November 18, 2010	3X6659	13.02
73	10	"The Alien Parasite Hypothesis"	Mark Cendrowski	Story by : Chuck Lorre & Steven Molaro & Steve Holland; Teleplay by : Lee Aronsohn & Jim Reynolds & Maria Ferrari	December 9, 2010	3X6660	12.03
74	11	"The Justice League Recombination"	Mark Cendrowski	Story by : Chuck Lorre & Lee Aronsohn & Maria Ferrari; Teleplay by : Bill Prady & Steven Molaro & Steve Holland	December 16, 2010	3X6661	13.24
75	12	"The Bus Pants Utilization"	Mark Cendrowski	Story by : Chuck Lorre & Lee Aronsohn & Maria Ferrari; Teleplay by : Bill Prady & Steven Molaro & Eric Kaplan	January 6, 2011	3X6662	13.98
76	13	"The Love Car Displacement"	Anthony Rich	Story by : Chuck Lorre & Bill Prady & Dave Goetsch; Teleplay by : Lee Aronsohn & Steven Molaro & Steve Holland	January 20, 2011	3X6663	13.63
77	14	"The Thespian Catalyst"	Mark Cendrowski	Story by : Chuck Lorre & Lee Aronsohn & Jim Reynolds; Teleplay by : Bill Prady & Steven Molaro & Maria Ferrari	February 3, 2011	3X6664	13.83
78	15	"The Benefactor Factor"	Mark Cendrowski	Story by : Bill Prady & Lee Aronsohn & Dave Goetsch; Teleplay by : Chuck Lorre & Eric Kaplan & Steve Holland	February 10, 2011	3X6665	12.79
79	16	"The Cohabitation Formulation"	Mark Cendrowski	Story by : Chuck Lorre & Lee Aronsohn & Dave Goetsch; Teleplay by : Bill Prady & Steven Molaro & Jim Reynolds	February 17, 2011	3X6666	12.41
80	17	"The Toast Derivation"	Mark Cendrowski	Story by : Bill Prady & Dave Goetsch & Maria Ferrari; Teleplay by : Chuck Lorre & Steven Molaro & Jim Reynolds	February 24, 2011	3X6667	12.35
81	18	"The Prestidigitation Approximation"	Mark Cendrowski	Story by : Bill Prady & Steve Holland & Eddie Gorodetsky; Teleplay by : Chuck Lorre & Steven Molaro & Eric Kaplan	March 10, 2011	3X6668	12.06
82	19	"The Zarnecki Incursion"	Peter Chakos	Story by : Chuck Lorre & Steven Molaro & Maria Ferrari; Teleplay by : Bill Prady & Dave Goetsch & Jim Reynolds	March 31, 2011	3X6669	11.92
83	20	"The Herb Garden Germination"	Mark Cendrowski	Story by : Chuck Lorre & Eric Kaplan & Eddie Gorodetsky; Teleplay by : Bill Prady & Steven Molaro & Steve Holland	April 7, 2011	3X6670	11.40
84	21	"The Agreement Dissection"	Mark Cendrowski	Story by : Bill Prady & Dave Goetsch & Eddie Gorodetsky; Teleplay by : Chuck Lorre & Steven Molaro & Eric Kaplan	April 28, 2011	3X6671	10.71
85	22	"The Wildebeest Implementation"	Mark Cendrowski	Story by : Chuck Lorre & Steven Molaro & Eric Kaplan; Teleplay by : Bill Prady & Eddie Gorodetsky & Maria Ferrari	May 5, 2011	3X6672	10.50
86	23	"The Engagement Reaction"	Howard Murray	Story by : Bill Prady & Eric Kaplan & Jim Reynolds; Teleplay by : Chuck Lorre & Steven Molaro & Steve Holland	May 12, 2011	3X6673	10.78
87	24	"The Roommate Transmogrification"	Mark Cendrowski	Story by : Chuck Lorre & Steven Molaro & Eddie Gorodetsky; Teleplay by : Bill Prady & Eric Kaplan & Jim Reynolds	May 19, 2011	3X6674	11.30

=== Season 5 (2011–12) ===
No. overall	No. in season	Title	Directed by	Written by	Original release date	Prod. code	US viewers (millions)
88	1	"The Skank Reflex Analysis"	Mark Cendrowski	Story by : Eric Kaplan & Maria Ferrari & Anthony Del Broccolo; Teleplay by : Chuck Lorre & Bill Prady & Steven Molaro	September 22, 2011	3X6851	14.30
89	2	"The Infestation Hypothesis"	Mark Cendrowski	Story by : Bill Prady & Steven Molaro & Maria Ferrari; Teleplay by : Chuck Lorre & Jim Reynolds & Steve Holland	September 22, 2011	3X6852	14.94
90	3	"The Pulled Groin Extrapolation"	Mark Cendrowski	Story by : Chuck Lorre & Eric Kaplan & Jim Reynolds; Teleplay by : Bill Prady & Steven Molaro & Dave Goetsch	September 29, 2011	3X6853	14.74
91	4	"The Wiggly Finger Catalyst"	Mark Cendrowski	Story by : Chuck Lorre & Dave Goetsch & Anthony Del Broccolo; Teleplay by : Bill Prady & Steven Molaro & Steve Holland	October 6, 2011	3X6854	13.92
92	5	"The Russian Rocket Reaction"	Mark Cendrowski	Story by : Bill Prady & Steven Molaro & Jim Reynolds; Teleplay by : Chuck Lorre & Eric Kaplan & Maria Ferrari	October 13, 2011	3X6855	13.58
93	6	"The Rhinitis Revelation"	Howard Murray	Story by : Chuck Lorre & Eric Kaplan & Steve Holland; Teleplay by : Bill Prady & Steven Molaro & Jim Reynolds	October 20, 2011	3X6857	14.93
94	7	"The Good Guy Fluctuation"	Mark Cendrowski	Story by : Chuck Lorre & Dave Goetsch & Maria Ferrari; Teleplay by : Bill Prady & Steven Molaro & Steve Holland	October 27, 2011	3X6856	14.54
95	8	"The Isolation Permutation"	Mark Cendrowski	Story by : Chuck Lorre & Eric Kaplan & Tara Hernandez; Teleplay by : Bill Prady & Steven Molaro & Steve Holland	November 3, 2011	3X6858	15.98
96	9	"The Ornithophobia Diffusion"	Mark Cendrowski	Story by : Chuck Lorre & Dave Goetsch & Anthony Del Broccolo; Teleplay by : Bill Prady & Steven Molaro & Eric Kaplan	November 10, 2011	3X6859	15.89
97	10	"The Flaming Spittoon Acquisition"	Mark Cendrowski	Story by : Chuck Lorre & Steven Molaro & Dave Goetsch; Teleplay by : Bill Prady & Jim Reynolds & Steve Holland	November 17, 2011	3X6860	15.05
98	11	"The Speckerman Recurrence"	Anthony Rich	Story by : Chuck Lorre & Bill Prady & Steve Holland; Teleplay by : Steven Molaro & Eric Kaplan & Anthony Del Broccolo	December 8, 2011	3X6861	14.02
99	12	"The Shiny Trinket Maneuver"	Mark Cendrowski	Story by : Chuck Lorre & Steve Holland & Tara Hernandez; Teleplay by : Bill Prady & Steven Molaro & Jim Reynolds	January 12, 2012	3X6862	16.13
100	13	"The Recombination Hypothesis"	Mark Cendrowski	Story by : Chuck Lorre; Teleplay by : Bill Prady & Steven Molaro	January 19, 2012	3X6863	15.83
101	14	"The Beta Test Initiation"	Mark Cendrowski	Story by : Chuck Lorre & Steven Molaro & Eric Kaplan; Teleplay by : Bill Prady & Dave Goetsch & Maria Ferrari	January 26, 2012	3X6864	16.13
102	15	"The Friendship Contraction"	Mark Cendrowski	Story by : Chuck Lorre & Eric Kaplan & Jim Reynolds; Teleplay by : Bill Prady & Steven Molaro & Steve Holland	February 2, 2012	3X6865	16.54
103	16	"The Vacation Solution"	Mark Cendrowski	Story by : Chuck Lorre & Anthony Del Broccolo & Tara Hernandez; Teleplay by : Bill Prady & Steven Molaro & Maria Ferrari	February 9, 2012	3X6866	16.21
104	17	"The Rothman Disintegration"	Mark Cendrowski	Story by : Chuck Lorre & Bill Prady & Steve Holland; Teleplay by : Steven Molaro & Eric Kaplan & Jim Reynolds	February 16, 2012	3X6867	15.65
105	18	"The Werewolf Transformation"	Mark Cendrowski	Story by : Chuck Lorre & Todd Craig & Gary Torvinen; Teleplay by : Bill Prady & Steven Molaro & Jim Reynolds & Maria Ferrari	February 23, 2012	3X6868	16.20
106	19	"The Weekend Vortex"	Mark Cendrowski	Story by : Chuck Lorre & Bill Prady & Tara Hernandez; Teleplay by : Steven Molaro & Eric Kaplan & Steve Holland	March 8, 2012	3X6869	15.04
107	20	"The Transporter Malfunction"	Mark Cendrowski	Story by : Chuck Lorre & Bill Prady & Maria Ferrari; Teleplay by : Steven Molaro & Jim Reynolds & Steve Holland	March 29, 2012	3X6870	13.96
108	21	"The Hawking Excitation"	Mark Cendrowski	Story by : Bill Prady & Steven Molaro & Steve Holland; Teleplay by : Chuck Lorre & Eric Kaplan & Maria Ferrari	April 5, 2012	3X6871	13.29
109	22	"The Stag Convergence"	Peter Chakos	Story by : Billy Prady & Steve Holland & Eric Kaplan; Teleplay by : Chuck Lorre & Steven Molaro & Jim Reynolds	April 26, 2012	3X6872	12.65
110	23	"The Launch Acceleration"	Mark Cendrowski	Story by : Chuck Lorre & Steven Molaro & Jim Reynolds; Teleplay by : Bill Prady & Steve Holland & Maria Ferrari	May 3, 2012	3X6873	13.91
111	24	"The Countdown Reflection"	Mark Cendrowski	Story by : Bill Prady & Eric Kaplan & Steve Holland; Teleplay by : Chuck Lorre & Steven Molaro & Jim Reynolds	May 10, 2012	3X6874	13.72

=== Season 6 (2012–13) ===
No. overall	No. in season	Title	Directed by	Written by	Original release date	Prod. code	U.S. viewers (millions)
112	1	"The Date Night Variable"	Mark Cendrowski	Story by : Chuck Lorre & Eric Kaplan & Steve Holland; Teleplay by : Steven Molaro & Jim Reynolds & Maria Ferrari	September 27, 2012	3X7601	15.66
113	2	"The Decoupling Fluctuation"	Mark Cendrowski	Story by : Chuck Lorre & Jim Reynolds & Maria Ferrari; Teleplay by : Steven Molaro & Eric Kaplan & Steve Holland	October 4, 2012	3X7602	15.18
114	3	"The Higgs Boson Observation"	Mark Cendrowski	Story by : Steven Molaro & Dave Goetsch & Steve Holland; Teleplay by : Chuck Lorre & Jim Reynolds & Maria Ferrari	October 11, 2012	3X7603	14.23
115	4	"The Re-Entry Minimization"	Mark Cendrowski	Story by : Bill Prady & Jim Reynolds & Anthony Del Broccolo; Teleplay by : Chuck Lorre & Steven Molaro & Eric Kaplan	October 18, 2012	3X7604	15.73
116	5	"The Holographic Excitation"	Mark Cendrowski	Story by : Chuck Lorre & Eric Kaplan & Jeremy Howe; Teleplay by : Steven Molaro & Steve Holland & Maria Ferrari	October 25, 2012	3X7605	15.82
117	6	"The Extract Obliteration"	Mark Cendrowski	Story by : Chuck Lorre & Bill Prady & Steve Holland; Teleplay by : Steven Molaro & Jim Reynolds & Eric Kaplan	November 1, 2012	3X7606	15.90
118	7	"The Habitation Configuration"	Mark Cendrowski	Story by : Chuck Lorre & Eric Kaplan & Jim Reynolds; Teleplay by : Steven Molaro & Steve Holland & Maria Ferrari	November 8, 2012	3X7607	16.68
119	8	"The 43 Peculiarity"	Mark Cendrowski	Story by : Chuck Lorre & Dave Goetsch & Anthony Del Broccolo; Teleplay by : Steven Molaro & Jim Reynolds & Steve Holland	November 15, 2012	3X7608	17.63
120	9	"The Parking Spot Escalation"	Peter Chakos	Story by : Chuck Lorre & Eric Kaplan & Adam Faberman; Teleplay by : Steven Molaro & Steve Holland & Maria Ferrari	November 29, 2012	3X7609	17.25
121	10	"The Fish Guts Displacement"	Mark Cendrowski	Story by : Chuck Lorre & Bill Prady & Tara Hernandez; Teleplay by : Steven Molaro & Eric Kaplan & Jim Reynolds	December 6, 2012	3X7610	16.94
122	11	"The Santa Simulation"	Mark Cendrowski	Story by : Chuck Lorre & Eric Kaplan & Steve Holland; Teleplay by : Steven Molaro & Jim Reynolds & Maria Ferrari	December 13, 2012	3X7611	16.77
123	12	"The Egg Salad Equivalency"	Mark Cendrowski	Story by : Chuck Lorre & Eric Kaplan & Jim Reynolds; Teleplay by : Steven Molaro & Bill Prady & Steve Holland	January 3, 2013	3X7612	19.25
124	13	"The Bakersfield Expedition"	Mark Cendrowski	Story by : Chuck Lorre & Jim Reynolds & Steve Holland; Teleplay by : Steven Molaro & Eric Kaplan & Maria Ferrari	January 10, 2013	3X7613	20.00
125	14	"The Cooper/Kripke Inversion"	Mark Cendrowski	Story by : Chuck Lorre & Eric Kaplan & Anthony Del Broccolo; Teleplay by : Steven Molaro & Jim Reynolds & Steve Holland	January 31, 2013	3X7614	17.76
126	15	"The Spoiler Alert Segmentation"	Mark Cendrowski	Story by : Chuck Lorre & Eric Kaplan & Steve Holland; Teleplay by : Steven Molaro & Maria Ferrari & Adam Faberman	February 7, 2013	3X7615	18.98
127	16	"The Tangible Affection Proof"	Mark Cendrowski	Story by : Chuck Lorre & Bill Prady & Steve Holland; Teleplay by : Steven Molaro & Jim Reynolds & Tara Hernandez	February 14, 2013	3X7616	17.89
128	17	"The Monster Isolation"	Mark Cendrowski	Story by : Chuck Lorre & Dave Goetsch & Maria Ferrari; Teleplay by : Steven Molaro & Eric Kaplan & Steve Holland	February 21, 2013	3X7617	17.62
129	18	"The Contractual Obligation Implementation"	Mark Cendrowski	Story by : Chuck Lorre & Eric Kaplan & Steve Holland; Teleplay by : Steven Molaro & Jim Reynolds & Maria Ferrari	March 7, 2013	3X7618	17.63
130	19	"The Closet Reconfiguration"	Anthony Rich	Story by : Chuck Lorre & Jim Reynolds & Maria Ferrari; Teleplay by : Steven Molaro & Steve Holland & Eric Kaplan	March 14, 2013	3X7619	15.90
131	20	"The Tenure Turbulence"	Mark Cendrowski	Story by : Steven Molaro & Eric Kaplan & Maria Ferrari; Teleplay by : Chuck Lorre & Steve Holland & Jim Reynolds	April 4, 2013	3X7620	17.24
132	21	"The Closure Alternative"	Mark Cendrowski	Story by : Chuck Lorre & Bill Prady & Tara Hernandez; Teleplay by : Steven Molaro & Jim Reynolds & Steve Holland	April 25, 2013	3X7621	15.05
133	22	"The Proton Resurgence"	Mark Cendrowski	Story by : Chuck Lorre & Jim Reynolds & Steve Holland; Teleplay by : Steven Molaro & Eric Kaplan & Maria Ferrari	May 2, 2013	3X7622	16.29
134	23	"The Love Spell Potential"	Anthony Rich	Story by : Chuck Lorre & Jim Reynolds & Maria Ferrari; Teleplay by : Steven Molaro & Eric Kaplan & Steve Holland	May 9, 2013	3X7623	16.30
135	24	"The Bon Voyage Reaction"	Mark Cendrowski	Story by : Steven Molaro & Steve Holland & Tara Hernandez; Teleplay by : Chuck Lorre & Jim Reynolds & Maria Ferrari	May 16, 2013	3X7624	15.48

=== Season 7 (2013–14) ===
No. overall	No. in season	Title	Directed by	Written by	Original release date	Prod. code	U.S. viewers (millions)
136	1	"The Hofstadter Insufficiency"	Mark Cendrowski	Story by : Chuck Lorre & Steven Molaro & Tara Hernandez; Teleplay by : Eric Kaplan & Jim Reynolds & Steve Holland	September 26, 2013	4X5301	18.99
137	2	"The Deception Verification"	Mark Cendrowski	Story by : Chuck Lorre & Eric Kaplan & Jim Reynolds; Teleplay by : Steven Molaro & Steve Holland & Maria Ferrari	September 26, 2013	4X5302	20.44
138	3	"The Scavenger Vortex"	Mark Cendrowski	Story by : Dave Goetsch & Eric Kaplan & Steve Holland; Teleplay by : Steven Molaro & Jim Reynolds & Maria Ferrari	October 3, 2013	4X5303	18.22
139	4	"The Raiders Minimization"	Mark Cendrowski	Story by : Chuck Lorre & Jim Reynolds & Tara Hernandez; Teleplay by : Steven Molaro & Steve Holland & Maria Ferrari	October 10, 2013	4X5304	17.64
140	5	"The Workplace Proximity"	Mark Cendrowski	Story by : Steven Molaro & Steve Holland & Maria Ferrari; Teleplay by : Chuck Lorre & Eric Kaplan & Jim Reynolds	October 17, 2013	4X5305	17.80
141	6	"The Romance Resonance"	Mark Cendrowski	Story by : Eric Kaplan & Jim Reynolds & Tara Hernandez; Teleplay by : Steven Molaro & Steve Holland & Maria Ferrari	October 24, 2013	4X5306	16.98
142	7	"The Proton Displacement"	Mark Cendrowski	Story by : Chuck Lorre & Maria Ferrari & Anthony Del Broccolo; Teleplay by : Steven Molaro & Eric Kaplan & Jim Reynolds	November 7, 2013	4X5307	16.89
143	8	"The Itchy Brain Simulation"	Mark Cendrowski	Story by : Steven Molaro & Bill Prady & Jim Reynolds; Teleplay by : Eric Kaplan & Steve Holland & Maria Ferrari	November 14, 2013	4X5308	18.30
144	9	"The Thanksgiving Decoupling"	Mark Cendrowski	Story by : Eric Kaplan & Steve Holland & Maria Ferrari; Teleplay by : Steven Molaro & Jim Reynolds & Jeremy Howe	November 21, 2013	4X5309	18.94
145	10	"The Discovery Dissipation"	Mark Cendrowski	Story by : Eric Kaplan & Jim Reynolds & Maria Ferrari; Teleplay by : Steven Molaro & Steve Holland & Adam Faberman	December 5, 2013	4X5310	15.63
146	11	"The Cooper Extraction"	Mark Cendrowski	Story by : Steven Molaro & Eric Kaplan & Maria Ferrari; Teleplay by : Jim Reynolds & Steve Holland & Tara Hernandez	December 12, 2013	4X5311	17.68
147	12	"The Hesitation Ramification"	Mark Cendrowski	Story by : Dave Goetsch & Jim Reynolds & Tara Hernandez; Teleplay by : Steven Molaro & Steve Holland & Maria Ferrari	January 2, 2014	4X5312	19.20
148	13	"The Occupation Recalibration"	Mark Cendrowski	Story by : Eric Kaplan & Maria Ferrari & Tara Hernandez; Teleplay by : Steven Molaro & Jim Reynolds & Steve Holland	January 9, 2014	4X5313	20.35
149	14	"The Convention Conundrum"	Mark Cendrowski	Story by : Eric Kaplan & Jim Reynolds & Adam Faberman; Teleplay by : Steven Molaro & Dave Goetsch & Steve Holland	January 30, 2014	4X5315	19.05
150	15	"The Locomotive Manipulation"	Mark Cendrowski	Story by : Jim Reynolds & Steve Holland & Tara Hernandez; Teleplay by : Steven Molaro & Eric Kaplan & Maria Ferrari	February 6, 2014	4X5314	17.53
151	16	"The Table Polarization"	Gay Linvill	Story by : Steven Molaro & Maria Ferrari & Tara Hernandez; Teleplay by : Chuck Lorre & Jim Reynolds & Steve Holland	February 27, 2014	4X5316	17.73
152	17	"The Friendship Turbulence"	Mark Cendrowski	Story by : Steven Molaro & Eric Kaplan & Tara Hernandez; Teleplay by : Jim Reynolds & Steve Holland & Maria Ferrari	March 6, 2014	4X5318	18.09
153	18	"The Mommy Observation"	Mark Cendrowski	Story by : Jim Reynolds & Steve Holland & Maria Ferrari; Teleplay by : Steven Molaro & Eric Kaplan & Anthony Del Broccolo	March 13, 2014	4X5319	17.34
154	19	"The Indecision Amalgamation"	Anthony Rich	Story by : Bill Prady & Eric Kaplan & Jim Reynolds; Teleplay by : Steven Molaro & Dave Goetsch & Steve Holland	April 3, 2014	4X5320	17.73
155	20	"The Relationship Diremption"	Mark Cendrowski	Story by : Steven Molaro & Bill Prady & Jim Reynolds; Teleplay by : Chuck Lorre & Eric Kaplan & Steve Holland	April 10, 2014	4X5321	16.49
156	21	"The Anything Can Happen Recurrence"	Mark Cendrowski	Story by : Steven Molaro & Eric Kaplan & Adam Faberman; Teleplay by : Jim Reynolds & Steve Holland & Tara Hernandez	April 24, 2014	4X5322	16.44
157	22	"The Proton Transmogrification"	Mark Cendrowski	Story by : Jim Reynolds & Maria Ferrari & Jeremy Howe; Teleplay by : Steven Molaro & Eric Kaplan & Steve Holland	May 1, 2014	4X5317	16.07
158	23	"The Gorilla Dissolution"	Peter Chakos	Story by : Chuck Lorre & Jim Reynolds & Jeremy Howe; Teleplay by : Steven Molaro & Steve Holland & Eric Kaplan	May 8, 2014	4X5323	14.42
159	24	"The Status Quo Combustion"	Mark Cendrowski	Story by : Eric Kaplan & Jim Reynolds & Jeremy Howe; Teleplay by : Steven Molaro & Steve Holland & Tara Hernandez	May 15, 2014	4X5324	16.73

=== Season 8 (2014–15) ===
No. overall	No. in season	Title	Directed by	Written by	Original release date	Prod. code	U.S. viewers (millions)
160	1	"The Locomotion Interruption"	Mark Cendrowski	Story by : Jim Reynolds & Maria Ferrari & Tara Hernandez; Teleplay by : Steven Molaro & Steve Holland & Eric Kaplan	September 22, 2014	4X6751	18.08
161	2	"The Junior Professor Solution"	Mark Cendrowski	Story by : Steven Molaro & Eric Kaplan & Steve Holland; Teleplay by : Jim Reynolds & Maria Ferrari & Tara Hernandez	September 22, 2014	4X6752	18.30
162	3	"The First Pitch Insufficiency"	Mark Cendrowski	Story by : Chuck Lorre & Jim Reynolds & Anthony Del Broccolo; Teleplay by : Steven Molaro & Steve Holland & Maria Ferrari	September 29, 2014	4X6753	16.44
163	4	"The Hook-Up Reverberation"	Mark Cendrowski	Story by : Steve Holland & Maria Ferrari & Tara Hernandez; Teleplay by : Steven Molaro & Eric Kaplan & Jim Reynolds	October 6, 2014	4X6754	15.94
164	5	"The Focus Attenuation"	Mark Cendrowski	Story by : Jim Reynolds & Maria Ferrari & Adam Faberman; Teleplay by : Steven Molaro & Eric Kaplan & Steve Holland	October 13, 2014	4X6755	15.63
165	6	"The Expedition Approximation"	Mark Cendrowski	Story by : Steven Molaro & Dave Goetsch & Tara Hernandez; Teleplay by : Jim Reynolds & Steve Holland & Maria Ferrari	October 20, 2014	4X6756	16.02
166	7	"The Misinterpretation Agitation"	Mark Cendrowski	Story by : Chuck Lorre & Eric Kaplan & Jim Reynolds; Teleplay by : Steven Molaro & Steve Holland & Maria Ferrari	October 30, 2014	4X6758	16.25
167	8	"The Prom Equivalency"	Mark Cendrowski	Story by : Jim Reynolds & Steve Holland & Jeremy Howe; Teleplay by : Steven Molaro & Eric Kaplan & Maria Ferrari	November 6, 2014	4X6757	16.56
168	9	"The Septum Deviation"	Anthony Rich	Story by : Steven Molaro & Bill Prady & Maria Ferrari; Teleplay by : Eric Kaplan & Steve Holland & Tara Hernandez	November 13, 2014	4X6759	16.90
169	10	"The Champagne Reflection"	Mark Cendrowski	Story by : Steven Molaro & Tara Hernandez & David Saltzberg & Ph.D; Teleplay by : Jim Reynolds & Steve Holland & Dave Goetsch	November 20, 2014	4X6760	14.61
170	11	"The Clean Room Infiltration"	Mark Cendrowski	Story by : Maria Ferrari & Tara Hernandez & Jeremy Howe; Teleplay by : Eric Kaplan & Jim Reynolds & Steve Holland	December 11, 2014	4X6761	15.49
171	12	"The Space Probe Disintegration"	Mark Cendrowski	Story by : Bill Prady & Eric Kaplan & Jim Reynolds; Teleplay by : Steven Molaro & Steve Holland & Maria Ferrari	January 8, 2015	4X6762	18.11
172	13	"The Anxiety Optimization"	Mark Cendrowski	Story by : Eric Kaplan & Maria Ferrari & Adam Faberman; Teleplay by : Jim Reynolds & Steve Holland & Tara Hernandez	January 29, 2015	4X6763	17.25
173	14	"The Troll Manifestation"	Mark Cendrowski	Story by : Steven Molaro & Eric Kaplan & Tara Hernandez; Teleplay by : Jim Reynolds & Steve Holland & Maria Ferrari	February 5, 2015	4X6765	17.09
174	15	"The Comic Book Store Regeneration"	Mark Cendrowski	Story by : Jim Reynolds & Maria Ferrari & Jeremy Howe; Teleplay by : Steven Molaro & Eric Kaplan & Steve Holland	February 19, 2015	4X6764	17.49
175	16	"The Intimacy Acceleration"	Mark Cendrowski	Story by : Dave Goetsch & Eric Kaplan & Tara Hernandez; Teleplay by : Steven Molaro & Jim Reynolds & Steve Holland	February 26, 2015	4X6766	16.67
176	17	"The Colonization Application"	Mark Cendrowski	Story by : Dave Goetsch & Jim Reynolds & Tara Hernandez; Teleplay by : Steven Molaro & Eric Kaplan & Maria Ferrari	March 5, 2015	4X6767	18.17
177	18	"The Leftover Thermalization"	Mark Cendrowski	Story by : Steven Molaro & Maria Ferrari & Jeremy Howe; Teleplay by : Eric Kaplan & Jim Reynolds & Steve Holland	March 12, 2015	4X6768	16.13
178	19	"The Skywalker Incursion"	Mark Cendrowski	Story by : Jim Reynolds & Tara Hernandez & Jeremy Howe; Teleplay by : Steven Molaro & Steve Holland & Maria Ferrari	April 2, 2015	4X6769	13.89
179	20	"The Fortification Implementation"	Mark Cendrowski	Story by : Jim Reynolds & Saladin K. Patterson & Tara Hernandez; Teleplay by : Steven Molaro & Steve Holland & Maria Ferrari	April 9, 2015	4X6770	14.78
180	21	"The Communication Deterioration"	Mark Cendrowski	Story by : Dave Goetsch & Steve Holland & Jeremy Howe; Teleplay by : Steven Molaro & Eric Kaplan & Jim Reynolds	April 16, 2015	4X6771	14.82
181	22	"The Graduation Transmission"	Anthony Rich	Story by : Chuck Lorre & Dave Goetsch & Anthony Del Broccolo; Teleplay by : Steven Molaro & Steve Holland & Eric Kaplan	April 23, 2015	4X6772	14.63
182	23	"The Maternal Combustion"	Anthony Rich	Story by : Steven Molaro & Tara Hernandez & Jeremy Howe; Teleplay by : Chuck Lorre & Jim Reynolds & Maria Ferrari	April 30, 2015	4X6773	13.85
183	24	"The Commitment Determination"	Mark Cendrowski	Story by : Chuck Lorre & Jim Reynolds & Maria Ferrari; Teleplay by : Steven Molaro & Steve Holland & Eric Kaplan	May 7, 2015	4X6774	14.64

=== Season 9 (2015–16) ===
No. overall	No. in season	Title	Directed by	Written by	Original release date	Prod. code	U.S. viewers (millions)
184	1	"The Matrimonial Momentum"	Mark Cendrowski	Story by : Chuck Lorre & Jim Reynolds & Maria Ferrari; Teleplay by : Steven Molaro & Steve Holland & Eric Kaplan	September 21, 2015	4X7201	18.20
185	2	"The Separation Oscillation"	Mark Cendrowski	Story by : Steven Molaro & Steve Holland & Tara Hernandez; Teleplay by : Chuck Lorre & Jim Reynolds & Maria Ferrari	September 28, 2015	4X7202	15.23
186	3	"The Bachelor Party Corrosion"	Mark Cendrowski	Story by : Dave Goetsch & Jim Reynolds & Jeremy Howe; Teleplay by : Steven Molaro & Steve Holland & Eric Kaplan	October 5, 2015	4X7203	15.40
187	4	"The 2003 Approximation"	Mark Cendrowski	Story by : Chuck Lorre & Steve Holland & Eric Kaplan; Teleplay by : Steven Molaro & Maria Ferrari & Tara Hernandez	October 12, 2015	4X7204	14.96
188	5	"The Perspiration Implementation"	Mark Cendrowski	Story by : Chuck Lorre & Eric Kaplan & Maria Ferrari; Teleplay by : Steven Molaro & Jim Reynolds & Saladin K. Patterson	October 19, 2015	4X7205	14.68
189	6	"The Helium Insufficiency"	Mark Cendrowski	Story by : Steve Holland & Maria Ferrari & Anthony Del Broccolo; Teleplay by : Steven Molaro & Eric Kaplan & Jim Reynolds	October 26, 2015	4X7207	16.32
190	7	"The Spock Resonance"	Nikki Lorre	Story by : Chuck Lorre & Jim Reynolds & Tara Hernandez; Teleplay by : Steven Molaro & Steve Holland & Jeremy Howe	November 5, 2015	4X7206	14.81
191	8	"The Mystery Date Observation"	Mark Cendrowski	Story by : Steven Molaro & Eric Kaplan & Jim Reynolds; Teleplay by : Chuck Lorre & Steve Holland & Tara Hernandez	November 12, 2015	4X7208	14.92
192	9	"The Platonic Permutation"	Mark Cendrowski	Story by : Jim Reynolds & Jeremy Howe & Tara Hernandez; Teleplay by : Steve Holland & Maria Ferrari & Adam Faberman	November 19, 2015	4X7209	15.19
193	10	"The Earworm Reverberation"	Mark Cendrowski	Story by : Eric Kaplan & Jim Reynolds & Saladin K. Patterson; Teleplay by : Steven Molaro & Steve Holland & Jeremy Howe	December 10, 2015	4X7210	15.27
194	11	"The Opening Night Excitation"	Mark Cendrowski	Story by : Steven Molaro & Eric Kaplan & Tara Hernandez; Teleplay by : Steve Holland & Jim Reynolds & Maria Ferrari	December 17, 2015	4X7211	17.23
195	12	"The Sales Call Sublimation"	Mark Cendrowski	Story by : Steve Holland & Jim Reynolds & Saladin K. Patterson; Teleplay by : Steven Molaro & Maria Ferrari & Anthony Del Broccolo	January 7, 2016	4X7212	15.85
196	13	"The Empathy Optimization"	Mark Cendrowski	Story by : Chuck Lorre & Eric Kaplan & Dave Goetsch; Teleplay by : Steven Molaro & Steve Holland & Saladin K. Patterson	January 14, 2016	4X7213	15.75
197	14	"The Meemaw Materialization"	Mark Cendrowski	Story by : Chuck Lorre & Jim Reynolds & Maria Ferrari; Teleplay by : Steven Molaro & Steve Holland & Tara Hernandez	February 4, 2016	4X7214	15.29
198	15	"The Valentino Submergence"	Mark Cendrowski	Story by : Steven Molaro & Jim Reynolds & Tara Hernandez; Teleplay by : Steve Holland & Eric Kaplan & Jeremy Howe	February 11, 2016	4X7215	16.25
199	16	"The Positive Negative Reaction"	Mark Cendrowski	Story by : Eric Kaplan & Jim Reynolds & Saladin K. Patterson; Teleplay by : Steven Molaro & Steve Holland & Maria Ferrari	February 18, 2016	4X7216	15.24
200	17	"The Celebration Experimentation"	Mark Cendrowski	Story by : Chuck Lorre & Eric Kaplan & Jeremy Howe; Teleplay by : Steven Molaro & Steve Holland & Tara Hernandez	February 25, 2016	4X7217	15.94
201	18	"The Application Deterioration"	Mark Cendrowski	Story by : Steven Molaro & Eric Kaplan & Adam Faberman; Teleplay by : Steve Holland & Jim Reynolds & Maria Ferrari	March 10, 2016	4X7218	14.68
202	19	"The Solder Excursion Diversion"	Mark Cendrowski	Story by : Bill Prady & Eric Kaplan & Maria Ferrari; Teleplay by : Steven Molaro & Steve Holland & Saladin K. Patterson	March 31, 2016	4X7219	14.24
203	20	"The Big Bear Precipitation"	Mark Cendrowski	Story by : Chuck Lorre & Dave Goetsch & Tara Hernandez; Teleplay by : Steven Molaro & Steve Holland & Jim Reynolds	April 7, 2016	4X7220	13.50
204	21	"The Viewing Party Combustion"	Mark Cendrowski	Story by : Eric Kaplan & Maria Ferrari & Jeremy Howe; Teleplay by : Steven Molaro & Steve Holland & Tara Hernandez	April 21, 2016	4X7221	14.16
205	22	"The Fermentation Bifurcation"	Nikki Lorre	Story by : Steven Molaro & Jim Reynolds & Anthony Del Broccolo; Teleplay by : Chuck Lorre & Steve Holland & Tara Hernandez	April 28, 2016	4X7222	14.13
206	23	"The Line Substitution Solution"	Anthony Rich	Story by : Steve Holland & Saladin K. Patterson & Tara Hernandez; Teleplay by : Steven Molaro & Eric Kaplan & Maria Ferrari	May 5, 2016	4X7223	13.22
207	24	"The Convergence Convergence"	Mark Cendrowski	Story by : Steven Molaro & Tara Hernandez & Adam Faberman; Teleplay by : Chuck Lorre & Steve Holland & Jeremy Howe	May 12, 2016	4X7224	14.73

=== Season 10 (2016–17) ===
No. overall	No. in season	Title	Directed by	Written by	Original release date	Prod. code	U.S. viewers (millions)
208	1	"The Conjugal Conjecture"	Mark Cendrowski	Story by : Chuck Lorre & Steve Holland & Tara Hernandez; Teleplay by : Steven Molaro & Eric Kaplan & Jim Reynolds	September 19, 2016	T12.15303	15.82
209	2	"The Military Miniaturization"	Mark Cendrowski	Story by : Chuck Lorre & Eric Kaplan & Jim Reynolds; Teleplay by : Steven Molaro & Steve Holland & Maria Ferrari	September 26, 2016	T12.15301	14.24
210	3	"The Dependence Transcendence"	Mark Cendrowski	Story by : Steven Molaro & Saladin K. Patterson & Tara Hernandez; Teleplay by : Steve Holland & Maria Ferrari & Jeremy Howe	October 3, 2016	T12.15302	14.32
211	4	"The Cohabitation Experimentation"	Mark Cendrowski	Story by : Chuck Lorre & Dave Goetsch & Maria Ferrari; Teleplay by : Steven Molaro & Steve Holland & Tara Hernandez	October 10, 2016	T12.15304	14.41
212	5	"The Hot Tub Contamination"	Mark Cendrowski	Story by : Chuck Lorre & Maria Ferrari & Tara Hernandez; Teleplay by : Steve Holland & Eric Kaplan & Jim Reynolds	October 17, 2016	T12.15305	14.20
213	6	"The Fetal Kick Catalyst"	Mark Cendrowski	Story by : Steve Holland & Tara Hernandez & Jeremy Howe; Teleplay by : Steven Molaro & Saladin K. Patterson & Anthony Del Broccolo	October 27, 2016	T12.15306	14.31
214	7	"The Veracity Elasticity"	Mark Cendrowski	Story by : Steven Molaro & Eric Kaplan & Maria Ferrari; Teleplay by : Steve Holland & Jim Reynolds & Adam Faberman	November 3, 2016	T12.15307	14.18
215	8	"The Brain Bowl Incubation"	Mark Cendrowski	Story by : Chuck Lorre & Steve Holland & Saladin K. Patterson; Teleplay by : Steven Molaro & Maria Ferrari & Tara Hernandez	November 10, 2016	T12.15308	14.47
216	9	"The Geology Elevation"	Mark Cendrowski	Story by : Chuck Lorre & Erik Kaplan & Maria Ferrari; Teleplay by : Steve Holland & Jim Reynolds & Jeremy Howe	November 17, 2016	T12.15309	14.34
217	10	"The Property Division Collision"	Mark Cendrowski	Story by : Steve Holland & Bill Prady & Steve Goetsch; Teleplay by : Steven Molaro & Maria Ferrari & Tara Hernandez	December 1, 2016	T12.15310	14.54
218	11	"The Birthday Synchronicity"	Nikki Lorre	Story by : Chuck Lorre & Steve Holland & Maria Ferrari; Teleplay by : Steven Molaro & Eric Kaplan & Tara Hernandez	December 15, 2016	T12.15311	15.96
219	12	"The Holiday Summation"	Mark Cendrowski	Story by : Steven Molaro & Eric Kaplan & Tara Hernandez; Teleplay by : Steve Holland & Maria Ferrari & Jeremy Howe	January 5, 2017	T12.15312	16.80
220	13	"The Romance Recalibration"	Mark Cendrowski	Story by : Chuck Lorre & Dave Goetsch & Anthony Del Broccolo; Teleplay by : Steven Molaro & Steve Holland & Saladin K. Patterson	January 19, 2017	T12.15313	15.15
221	14	"The Emotion Detection Automation"	Mark Cendrowski	Story by : Chuck Lorre & Steven Molaro & Eric Kaplan; Teleplay by : Steve Holland & Jim Reynolds & Saladin K. Patterson	February 2, 2017	T12.15314	14.66
222	15	"The Locomotion Reverberation"	Mark Cendrowski	Story by : Chuck Lorre & Steve Holland & Jim Reynolds; Teleplay by : Steven Molaro & Maria Ferrari & Tara Hernandez	February 9, 2017	T12.15315	14.15
223	16	"The Allowance Evaporation"	Mark Cendrowski	Story by : Eric Kaplan & Maria Ferrari & Jeremy Howe; Teleplay by : Steven Molaro & Steve Holland & Jim Reynolds	February 16, 2017	T12.15316	13.51
224	17	"The Comic-Con Conundrum"	Mark Cendrowski	Story by : Eric Kaplan & Saladin K. Patterson & Tara Hernandez; Teleplay by : Steven Molaro & Steve Holland & Maria Ferrari	February 23, 2017	T12.15317	13.38
225	18	"The Escape Hatch Identification"	Mark Cendrowski	Story by : Steven Molaro & Eric Kaplan & Anthony Del Broccolo; Teleplay by : Steve Holland & Jim Reynolds & Tara Hernandez	March 9, 2017	T12.15318	13.08
226	19	"The Collaboration Fluctuation"	Mark Cendrowski	Story by : Chuck Lorre & Tara Hernandez & Giuseppe Graziano; Teleplay by : Steven Molaro & Steve Holland & Dave Goetsch	March 30, 2017	T12.15319	12.78
227	20	"The Recollection Dissipation"	Mark Cendrowski	Story by : Eric Kaplan & Tara Hernandez & Jeremy Howe; Teleplay by : Steven Molaro & Steve Holland & Maria Ferrari	April 6, 2017	T12.15320	12.59
228	21	"The Separation Agitation"	Mark Cendrowski	Story by : Steven Molaro & Jim Reynolds & Maria Ferrari; Teleplay by : Steve Holland & Tara Hernandez & Jeremy Howe	April 13, 2017	T12.15321	11.89
229	22	"The Cognition Regeneration"	Mark Cendrowski	Story by : Steve Holland & Tara Hernandez & Jeremy Howe; Teleplay by : Dave Goetsch & Eric Kaplan & Jim Reynolds	April 27, 2017	T12.15322	12.52
230	23	"The Gyroscopic Collapse"	Anthony Rich	Story by : Chuck Lorre & Steve Holland & Alex Ayers; Teleplay by : Steven Molaro & Jim Reynolds & Saladin K. Patterson	May 4, 2017	T12.15323	12.39
231	24	"The Long Distance Dissonance"	Mark Cendrowski	Story by : Steven Molaro & Eric Kaplan & Jim Reynolds; Teleplay by : Chuck Lorre & Steve Holland & Tara Hernandez	May 11, 2017	T12.15324	12.99

=== Season 11 (2017–18) ===
No. overall	No. in season	Title	Directed by	Written by	Original release date	Prod. code	U.S. viewers (millions)
232	1	"The Proposal Proposal"	Mark Cendrowski	Story by : Chuck Lorre & Eric Kaplan & Jeremy Howe; Teleplay by : Steve Holland & Maria Ferrari & Tara Hernandez	September 25, 2017	T12.15601	17.65
233	2	"The Retraction Reaction"	Mark Cendrowski	Story by : Steven Molaro & Steve Holland & Maria Ferrari; Teleplay by : Dave Goetsch & Eric Kaplan & Anthony Del Broccolo	October 2, 2017	T12.15602	14.06
234	3	"The Relaxation Integration"	Mark Cendrowski	Story by : Chuck Lorre & Steve Holland & Adam Faberman; Teleplay by : Maria Ferrari & Andy Gordon & Tara Hernandez	October 9, 2017	T12.15603	13.13
235	4	"The Explosion Implosion"	Mark Cendrowski	Story by : Bill Prady & Maria Ferrari & Tara Hernandez; Teleplay by : Steve Holland & Eric Kaplan & Jeremy Howe	October 16, 2017	T12.15604	13.07
236	5	"The Collaboration Contamination"	Nikki Lorre	Story by : Steven Molaro & Steve Holland & Eric Kaplan; Teleplay by : Dave Goetsch & Maria Ferrari & Jeremy Howe	October 23, 2017	T12.15605	13.20
237	6	"The Proton Regeneration"	Mark Cendrowski	Story by : Steven Molaro, Dave Goetsch, Alex Yonks; Teleplay by : Dave Steve Holland, Andy Gordon, Jeremy Howe	November 2, 2017	T12.15606	14.14
238	7	"The Geology Methodology"	Mark Cendrowski	Story by : Steve Holland & Anthony Del Broccolo & Adam Faberman; Teleplay by : Eric Kaplan & Maria Ferrari & Tara Hernandez	November 9, 2017	T12.15607	13.80
239	8	"The Tesla Recoil"	Anthony Rich	Story by : Chuck Lorre & Eric Kaplan & Tara Hernandez; Teleplay by : Steve Holland & Maria Ferrari & Jeremy Howe	November 16, 2017	T12.15608	13.44
240	9	"The Bitcoin Entanglement"	Mark Cendrowski	Story by : Steve Holland & Andy Gordon & Jeremy Howe; Teleplay by : Dave Goetsch & Maria Ferrari & Anthony Del Broccolo	November 30, 2017	T12.15609	13.84
241	10	"The Confidence Erosion"	Mark Cendrowski	Story by : Bill Prady & Maria Ferrari & Adam Faberman; Teleplay by : Steve Holland & Eric Kaplan & Tara Hernandez	December 7, 2017	T12.15610	14.41
242	11	"The Celebration Reverberation"	Mark Cendrowski	Story by : Steve Holland & Eric Kaplan & Alex Ayers; Teleplay by : Dave Goetsch & Maria Ferrari & Jeremy Howe	December 14, 2017	T12.15611	13.74
243	12	"The Matrimonial Metric"	Mark Cendrowski	Story by : Maria Ferrari & Tara Hernandez & Jeremy Howe; Teleplay by : Steve Holland & Eric Kaplan & Andy Gordon	January 4, 2018	T12.15612	16.16
244	13	"The Solo Oscillation"	Mark Cendrowski	Story by : Chuck Lorre & Steve Holland & Anthony Del Broccolo; Teleplay by : Eric Kaplan & Maria Ferrari & Jeremy Howe	January 11, 2018	T12.15613	15.93
245	14	"The Separation Triangulation"	Mark Cendrowski	Story by : Chuck Lorre & Eric Kaplan & Maria Ferrari; Teleplay by : Steven Molaro & Steve Holland & Tara Hernandez	January 18, 2018	T12.15614	14.92
246	15	"The Novelization Correlation"	Mark Cendrowski	Story by : Steve Holland & Andy Gordon & Adam Faberman; Teleplay by : Eric Kaplan & Maria Ferrari & Jeremy Howe	February 1, 2018	T12.15615	14.69
247	16	"The Neonatal Nomenclature"	Gay Linvill	Story by : Eric Kaplan & Maria Ferrari & Anthony Del Broccolo; Teleplay by : Steve Holland & Tara Hernandez & Adam Faberman	March 1, 2018	T12.15616	13.75
248	17	"The Athenaeum Allocation"	Mark Cendrowski	Story by : Steve Holland & Steven Molaro & Tara Hernandez; Teleplay by : Dave Goetsch & Eric Kaplan & Maria Ferrari	March 8, 2018	T12.15617	13.88
249	18	"The Gates Excitation"	Mark Cendrowski	Story by : Eric Kaplan & Maria Ferrari & Andy Gordon; Teleplay by : Steve Holland & Tara Hernadnez & Jeremy Howe	March 29, 2018	T12.15618	13.26
250	19	"The Tenant Disassociation"	Mark Cendrowski	Story by : Steve Holland & Jeremy Howe & Trevor Alper; Teleplay by : Dave Goetsch & Eric Kaplan & Maria Ferrari	April 5, 2018	T12.15619	13.00
251	20	"The Reclusive Potential"	Mark Cendrowski	Story by : Maria Ferrari & Anthony Del Broccolo & Tara Hernandez; Teleplay by : Steve Holland & Eric Kaplan & Adam Faberman	April 12, 2018	T12.15620	12.77
252	21	"The Comet Polarization"	Mark Cendrowski	Story by : Steve Holland & Bill Prady & Eric Kaplan; Teleplay by : Maria Ferrari & Andy Gordon & Tara Hernandez	April 19, 2018	T12.15621	12.91
253	22	"The Monetary Insufficiency"	Nikki Lorre	Story by : Dave Goetsch & Maria Ferrari & Tara Hernandez; Teleplay by : Steve Holland & Eric Kaplan & Jeremy Howe	April 26, 2018	T12.15622	11.79
254	23	"The Sibling Realignment"	Mark Cendrowski	Story by : Steve Holland & Eric Kaplan & Anthony Del Broccolo; Teleplay by : Dave Goetsch & Maria Ferrari & Jeremy Howe	May 3, 2018	T12.15623	12.93
255	24	"The Bow Tie Asymmetry"	Mark Cendrowski	Story by : Chuck Lorre & Steven Molaro & Maria Ferrari; Teleplay by : Steve Holland & Eric Kaplan & Tara Hernandez	May 10, 2018	T12.15624	15.51

=== Season 12 (2018–19) ===
No. overall	No. in season	Title	Directed by	Written by	Original release date	Prod. code	U.S. viewers (millions)
256	1	"The Conjugal Configuration"	Mark Cendrowski	Story by : Chuck Lorre & Eric Kaplan & Tara Hernandez; Teleplay by : Steve Holland & Maria Ferrari & Jeremy Howe	September 24, 2018	T12.16001	12.92
257	2	"The Wedding Gift Wormhole"	Mark Cendrowski	Story by : Steve Holland & Steven Molaro & Maria Ferrari; Teleplay by : Dave Goetsch & Eric Kaplan & Andy Gordon	September 27, 2018	T12.16002	12.04
258	3	"The Procreation Calculation"	Mark Cendrowski	Story by : Chuck Lorre & Tara Hernandez & Adam Faberman; Teleplay by : Steve Holland & Maria Ferrari & Anthony Del Broccolo	October 4, 2018	T12.16003	12.29
259	4	"The Tam Turbulence"	Mark Cendrowski	Story by : Steve Holland & Steven Molaro & Maria Ferrari; Teleplay by : Dave Goetsch & Eric Kaplan & Jeremy Howe	October 11, 2018	T12.16004	12.94
260	5	"The Planetarium Collision"	Mark Cendrowski	Story by : Eric Kaplan & Andy Gordon & Alex Ayers; Teleplay by : Steve Holland & Maria Ferrari & Tara Hernandez	October 18, 2018	T12.16005	12.22
261	6	"The Imitation Perturbation"	Mark Cendrowski	Story by : Steve Holland & Maria Ferrari & Tara Hernandez; Teleplay by : Eric Kaplan & Jeremy Howe & Adam Faberman	October 25, 2018	T12.16006	12.99
262	7	"The Grant Allocation Derivation"	Mark Cendrowski	Story by : Eric Kaplan & Anthony Del Broccolo & Alex Yonks; Teleplay by : Steve Holland & Dave Goetsch & Maria Ferrari	November 1, 2018	T12.16007	12.64
263	8	"The Consummation Deviation"	Mark Cendrowski	Story by : Chuck Lorre & Steve Holland & Maria Ferrari; Teleplay by : Eric Kaplan & Andy Gordon & Adam Faberman	November 8, 2018	T12.16008	12.85
264	9	"The Citation Negation"	Kristy Cecil	Story by : Eric Kaplan & Tara Hernandez & Jeremy Howe; Teleplay by : Steve Holland & Dave Goetsch & Maria Ferrari	November 15, 2018	T12.16009	12.56
265	10	"The VCR Illumination"	Mark Cendrowski	Story by : Steve Holland & Steven Molaro & Bill Prady; Teleplay by : Maria Ferrari & Andy Gordon & Jeremy Howe	December 6, 2018	T12.16010	12.52
266	11	"The Paintball Scattering"	Mark Cendrowski	Story by : Maria Ferrari & Tara Hernandez & Adam Faberman; Teleplay by : Steve Holland & Eric Kaplan & Anthony Del Broccolo	January 3, 2019	T12.16011	12.80
267	12	"The Propagation Proposition"	Mark Cendrowski	Story by : Chuck Lorre & Steve Holland & Jeremy Howe; Teleplay by : Maria Ferrari & Dave Goetsch & Eric Kaplan	January 10, 2019	T12.16012	13.53
268	13	"The Confirmation Polarization"	Mark Cendrowski	Story by : Eric Kaplan & Andy Gordon & Anthony Del Broccolo; Teleplay by : Steve Holland & Maria Ferrari & Tara Hernandez	January 17, 2019	T12.16013	13.32
269	14	"The Meteorite Manifestation"	Mark Cendrowski	Story by : Chuck Lorre & Steve Holland & Maria Ferrari; Teleplay by : Eric Kaplan & Tara Hernandez & Jeremy Howe	January 31, 2019	T12.16014	13.66
270	15	"The Donation Oscillation"	Mark Cendrowski	Story by : Bill Prady & Jeremy Howe & Adam Faberman; Teleplay by : Steve Holland & Dave Goetsch & Maria Ferrari	February 7, 2019	T12.16015	13.97
271	16	"The D&D Vortex"	Mark Cendrowski	Story by : Steve Holland & Maria Ferrari & Anthony Del Broccolo; Teleplay by : Eric Kaplan & Andy Gordon & Tara Hernandez	February 21, 2019	T12.16016	13.48
272	17	"The Conference Valuation"	Mark Cendrowski	Story by : Chuck Lorre & Steven Molaro & Eric Kaplan; Teleplay by : Steve Holland & Maria Ferrari & Jeremy Howe	March 7, 2019	T12.16017	12.99
273	18	"The Laureate Accumulation"	Mark Cendrowski	Story by : Steve Holland & Adam Faberman & David Saltzberg; Teleplay by : Dave Goetsch & Eric Kaplan & Maria Ferrari	April 4, 2019	T12.16018	12.22
274	19	"The Inspiration Deprivation"	Mark Cendrowski	Story by : Eric Kaplan & Maria Ferrari & Andy Gordon; Teleplay by : Steve Holland & Anthony Del Broccolo & Tara Hernandez	April 18, 2019	T12.16019	11.44
275	20	"The Decision Reverberation"	Mark Cendrowski	Story by : Steven Molaro & Steve Holland & Tara Hernandez; Teleplay by : Eric Kaplan & Maria Ferrari & Jermey Howe	April 25, 2019	T12.16020	11.84
276	21	"The Plagiarism Schism"	Nikki Lorre	Story by : Eric Kaplan & Maria Ferrari & Adam Faberman; Teleplay by : Steve Holland & Dave Goetsch & Tara Hernandez	May 2, 2019	T12.16021	12.48
277	22	"The Maternal Conclusion"	Kristy Cecil	Story by : Steve Holland & Eric Kaplan & Jeremy Howe; Teleplay by : Maria Ferrari & Andy Gordon & Anthony Del Broccolo	May 9, 2019	T12.16022	12.59
278	23	"The Change Constant"	Mark Cendrowski	Chuck Lorre & Steve Holland & Steven Molaro & Bill Prady & Dave Goetsch & Eric Kaplan & Maria Ferrari & Andy Gordon & Anthony Del Broccolo & Tara Hernandez & Jeremy Howe & Adam Faberman	May 16, 2019	T12.16023	18.52
279	24	"The Stockholm Syndrome"	Mark Cendrowski	Chuck Lorre & Steve Holland & Steven Molaro & Bill Prady & Dave Goetsch & Eric Kaplan & Maria Ferrari & Andy Gordon & Anthony Del Broccolo & Tara Hernandez & Jeremy Howe & Adam Faberman	May 16, 2019	T12.16024	18.52

== Farewell special ==
Title	Directed by	Written by	Original release date	Prod. code	US viewers (millions)
"Unraveling the Mystery: A Big Bang Farewell"	Chuck Lorre	Chuck Lorre & Steven Molaro & Steve Holland	May 16, 2019	T12.16026	11.61
Johnny Galecki and Kaley Cuoco host a retrospective of the series looking back on the most memorable moments.

== Viewing figures ==
=== Seasons 1–3 ===
The Big Bang Theory : U.S. viewers per episode (millions)

Season	Episode number																						
Season	1	2	3	4	5	6	7	8	9	10	11	12	13	14	15	16	17	18	19	20	21	22	23
1	9.52	8.50	8.35	7.94	8.81	8.41	9.37	9.32	8.93	8.53	8.44	7.63	7.39	8.07	7.38	7.79	7.34	–					
2	9.32	8.60	9.39	9.34	9.33	9.67	10.01	9.76	10.03	10.50	11.22	11.81	11.03	10.84	12.72	10.83	9.47	9.69	9.74	10.06	9.24	9.25	9.76
3	12.96	13.27	12.52	13.07	13.47	12.73	12.80	13.23	14.13	14.38	15.58	15.82	15.05	15.51	16.26	15.73	16.32	13.42	13.39	11.63	13.73	15.02	15.02

Audience measurement performed by Nielsen Media Research

=== Seasons 4–6 ===
The Big Bang Theory : U.S. viewers per episode (millions)

Season	Episode number																							
Season	1	2	3	4	5	6	7	8	9	10	11	12	13	14	15	16	17	18	19	20	21	22	23	24
4	14.04	13.05	12.59	12.57	13.05	13.04	14.00	13.11	13.02	12.03	13.24	13.98	13.63	13.83	12.79	12.41	12.35	12.06	11.92	11.40	10.71	10.50	10.78	11.30
5	14.30	14.94	14.74	13.92	13.58	14.93	14.54	15.98	15.89	15.05	14.02	16.13	15.83	16.13	16.54	16.21	15.65	16.20	15.04	13.96	13.29	12.65	13.91	13.72
6	15.66	15.18	14.23	15.73	15.82	15.90	16.68	17.63	17.25	16.94	16.77	19.25	20.00	17.76	18.98	17.89	17.62	17.63	15.90	17.24	15.05	16.29	16.30	15.48

Audience measurement performed by Nielsen Media Research

=== Seasons 7–9 ===
The Big Bang Theory : U.S. viewers per episode (millions)

Season	Episode number																							
Season	1	2	3	4	5	6	7	8	9	10	11	12	13	14	15	16	17	18	19	20	21	22	23	24
7	18.99	20.44	18.22	17.64	17.80	16.98	16.89	18.30	18.94	15.63	17.68	19.20	20.35	19.05	17.53	17.73	18.09	17.34	17.73	16.49	16.44	16.07	14.42	16.73
8	18.08	18.30	16.44	15.94	15.63	16.02	16.25	16.56	16.90	14.61	15.49	18.11	17.25	17.09	17.49	16.67	18.17	16.13	13.89	14.78	14.82	14.63	13.85	14.64
9	18.20	15.23	15.40	14.96	14.68	16.32	14.81	14.92	15.19	15.27	17.23	15.85	15.75	15.29	16.25	15.24	15.94	14.68	14.24	13.50	14.16	14.13	13.22	14.73

Audience measurement performed by Nielsen Media Research

=== Seasons 10–12 ===
The Big Bang Theory : U.S. viewers per episode (millions)

Season	Episode number																							
Season	1	2	3	4	5	6	7	8	9	10	11	12	13	14	15	16	17	18	19	20	21	22	23	24
10	15.82	14.24	14.32	14.41	14.20	14.31	14.18	14.47	14.34	14.54	15.96	16.80	15.15	14.66	14.15	13.51	13.38	13.08	12.78	12.59	11.89	12.52	12.39	12.99
11	17.65	14.06	13.13	13.07	13.20	14.14	13.80	13.44	13.84	14.41	13.74	16.16	15.93	14.92	14.69	13.75	13.88	13.26	13.00	12.77	12.91	11.79	12.93	15.51
12	12.92	12.04	12.29	12.94	12.22	12.99	12.64	12.85	12.56	12.52	12.80	13.53	13.32	13.66	13.97	13.48	12.99	12.22	11.44	11.84	12.48	12.59	18.52	18.52

Audience measurement performed by Nielsen Media Research
