= The Big Bang Theory season 5 =

The Big Bang Theory
- Season 5
- DVD cover art
- Showrunner: Bill Prady
- Starring: Johnny Galecki; Jim Parsons; Kaley Cuoco; Simon Helberg; Kunal Nayyar; Mayim Bialik; Melissa Rauch
- No. of episodes: 24

Release
- Original network: CBS
- Original release: September 22, 2011 – May 10, 2012

Season chronology
- ← Previous; Season 4 Next → Season 6

The fifth season of the American television sitcom The Big Bang Theory aired on CBS from September 22, 2011 to May 10, 2012.

At the 64th Primetime Emmy Awards, The Big Bang Theory was nominated for Outstanding Comedy Series, but Modern Family on ABC won. The show was also nominated for Outstanding Technical Direction, Camerawork, Video Control for a Series and Outstanding Multi-Camera Picture Editing For A Comedy Series.

Jim Parsons (Sheldon Cooper) was nominated for Outstanding Lead Actor in a Comedy Series for "The Werewolf Transformation", but lost out to Jon Cryer. Mayim Bialik (Amy Farrah Fowler) was nominated for Outstanding Supporting Actress in a Comedy Series for "The Shiny Trinket Maneuver", but lost out to Julie Bowen.

== Cast ==
=== Main cast ===
- Johnny Galecki as Dr. Leonard Hofstadter
- Jim Parsons as Dr. Sheldon Cooper
- Kaley Cuoco as Penny
- Simon Helberg as Howard Wolowitz
- Kunal Nayyar as Dr. Rajesh "Raj" Koothrappali
- Mayim Bialik as Dr. Amy Farrah Fowler
- Melissa Rauch as Dr. Bernadette Rostenkowski

=== Special guest cast ===
- Brent Spiner as himself
- Leonard Nimoy as Spock (voice)

=== Recurring cast ===
- Christine Baranski as Dr. Beverly Hofstadter
- Aarti Mann as Priya Koothrappali
- Brian George as Dr. V.M. Koothrappali
- Alice Amter as Mrs. Koothrappali
- Carol Ann Susi as Mrs. Wolowitz
- Wil Wheaton as himself
- Kevin Sussman as Stuart Bloom
- Laurie Metcalf as Mary Cooper
- John Ross Bowie as Dr. Barry Kripke
- Mike Massimino as himself
- Joshua Malina as President Siebert
- Vernee Watson as Althea
- Casey Sander as Mike Rostenkowski
- Pasha Lychnikoff as Dimitri Rezinov
- Stephen Hawking as himself

=== Guest cast ===
- Katie Leclerc as Emily
- Courtney Ford as Alice
- Blake Berris as Kevin
- Ashley Austin Morris as Laura
- Josh Brener as Dale
- Lance Barber as Jimmy Speckerman
- Jonathan Schmock as Jonathan
- Jim Turner as Reverend White
- Becky O'Donohue as Siri
- Lynn Phillip Seibel as Professor Rothman
- Peter Onorati as Angelo
- Chriselle Almeida as Lakshmi
- Robert Clotworthy as Dave Roeger (voice)
- Amy Tolsky as Joan

== Production ==
In January 2011, the series was picked up for a fifth, sixth and seventh season through the 2013–14 television season.

Several high-profile celebrities appear in the season. In "The Transporter Malfunction", actor Leonard Nimoy appears as a voice actor, playing an action-figure Spock that Sheldon imagines talking to him. In the following episode, "The Hawking Excitation", cosmologist Stephen Hawking appears as a guest star. Astronaut Mike Massimino appears in "The Friendship Contraction" and "The Countdown Reflection". Stephen Hawking went on to appear in the sixth season episode, "The Extract Obliteration" and the seventh season episode, "The Relationship Diremption". Mike Massimino later appeared in the sixth season episodes, "The Decoupling Fluctuation" and "The Re-Entry Minimization".

The season finale depicts Howard Wolowitz traveling to the International Space Station (ISS) on board a Soyuz rocket. Thanks to technical consulting from astronaut Mike Massimino, who also plays himself on the show, the production crew was able to put together sets that realistically depicts the Soyuz capsule and the ISS. The Soyuz capsule was constructed based on photos from NASA, the Kansas Cosmosphere for dimensions, and scavenged parts from an aerospace junkyard in Los Angeles.

== Episodes ==
No. overall	No. in season	Title	Directed by	Written by	Original release date	Prod. code	US viewers (millions)
88	1	"The Skank Reflex Analysis"	Mark Cendrowski	Story by : Eric Kaplan & Maria Ferrari & Anthony Del Broccolo; Teleplay by : Chuck Lorre & Bill Prady & Steven Molaro	September 22, 2011	3X6851	14.30
Raj finds himself in hot water with Leonard after his night with Penny and also with Howard when, during a rather tense lunch at the cafeteria, Leonard spills the beans on Raj's infatuation with Bernadette. Raj has feelings for Penny and wants to talk to her about the events of the night. Penny feels that this has damaged her relationship with the guys permanently and decides to move back to Omaha, as she has not had any worthwhile acting jobs since moving. Sheldon appoints himself as the captain of the team of the university's interdepartmental paintball tournament, but receives no support from the other guys, since both Leonard and Howard are mad at Raj; in a last minute move, he sacrifices himself to the geology department by crying out his disdain for the field as he is shot, upcharging the guys who are enraged and go on a mad spree, ultimately winning the tournament. Finally, however, Raj speaks to Penny and reveals to her that nothing happened between them since he preempted anything. Relieved on knowing she was not involved, and after receiving a call from her agent for a hemerrhoid commercial, Penny decides to stay back in Pasadena; when she talks to the guys about this, Leonard is relieved she is not going back.
89	2	"The Infestation Hypothesis"	Mark Cendrowski	Story by : Bill Prady & Steven Molaro & Maria Ferrari; Teleplay by : Chuck Lorre & Jim Reynolds & Steve Holland	September 22, 2011	3X6852	14.94
Penny gets a new chair, which Sheldon enjoys until he finds out that she picked it up from the street. He constantly pesters Penny to dispose of it, to no avail, until a mishap forces her and Amy to eventually do so. Meanwhile, Leonard enlists Howard's help in adding some spice to his long-distance relationship with Priya after she moves back to India.
90	3	"The Pulled Groin Extrapolation"	Mark Cendrowski	Story by : Chuck Lorre & Eric Kaplan & Jim Reynolds; Teleplay by : Bill Prady & Steven Molaro & Dave Goetsch	September 29, 2011	3X6853	14.74
Sheldon goes to the model train store to hear a lecture on model trains, and is convinced into buying an HO scale model train set. Amy decides to take Leonard instead of Sheldon as her date to a wedding for two scientists. Meanwhile, Howard and Bernadette's relationship hits a snag when Bernadette tells Howard that she would not move in with him and his mother after they get married. Howard asks her to stay with him and his mother for the weekend as a "trial", to which she agrees.
91	4	"The Wiggly Finger Catalyst"	Mark Cendrowski	Story by : Chuck Lorre & Dave Goetsch & Anthony Del Broccolo; Teleplay by : Bill Prady & Steven Molaro & Steve Holland	October 6, 2011	3X6854	13.92
Penny sets up Raj on a date with her deaf friend Emily, for whom his selective mutism is not an issue. Meanwhile, Sheldon decides to use Dungeons & Dragons dice to help him make trivial decisions so that his mind is free for more important things. Although this allows him to get some important work done more efficiently, it also results in him eating things he would not normally eat, and making odd decisions.
92	5	"The Russian Rocket Reaction"	Mark Cendrowski	Story by : Bill Prady & Steven Molaro & Jim Reynolds; Teleplay by : Chuck Lorre & Eric Kaplan & Maria Ferrari	October 13, 2011	3X6855	13.58
Howard is ecstatic to learn that he will be traveling to the International Space Station as a payload specialist to assist in the implementation of a deep space telescope designed by his engineering team. Meanwhile, while Sheldon and Leonard are at the comic book store, Wil Wheaton shows up and invites them to a party at his house. Wheaton and Sheldon ultimately reconcile after the former apologizes to the latter for the childhood grudge he holds against him, which led to their showdowns in Season 3 during "The Creepy Candy Coating Corollary" and "The Wheaton Recurrence".
93	6	"The Rhinitis Revelation"	Howard Murray	Story by : Chuck Lorre & Eric Kaplan & Steve Holland; Teleplay by : Bill Prady & Steven Molaro & Jim Reynolds	October 20, 2011	3X6857	14.93
Sheldon's mother comes to Pasadena for a weekend visit while waiting to board a Christian cruise. However she decides to spend her time eating out and sightseeing with Leonard, Penny, Howard and Raj instead of cooking and watching Sheldon embarrass a Nobel laureate. This upsets him, creating a standoff between himself and his mother. When he talks about his mother's behavior to Amy, she counsels him that his emotional reaction to his mother ignoring him is no different from that of any other human being, and that the less intelligent might be able to handle their emotions better by not over thinking them. While returning home that evening, he gets caught in the rain and comes down with a fever, prompting his mother to nurse him back to health.
94	7	"The Good Guy Fluctuation"	Mark Cendrowski	Story by : Chuck Lorre & Dave Goetsch & Maria Ferrari; Teleplay by : Bill Prady & Steven Molaro & Steve Holland	October 27, 2011	3X6856	14.54
Leonard meets a comic book enthusiast named Alice at the comic book store and is immediately attracted to her. However he is still in a committed relationship with Priya and as a result is torn between cheating on her with Alice or staying loyal. He goes to Penny for advice, but he does not find her advice useful, so he goes to Sheldon, who quotes Friedrich Nietzsche's views on morality. Leonard goes to Alice's apartment but just when they are about to have sex, he tells Alice that he already has a girlfriend, prompting her to throw him out of her apartment. Later he tells Priya via Skype about how he tried to cheat on her. Priya accepts his actions, but reveals that she also cheated by sleeping with her ex-boyfriend. Leonard becomes very upset at this and closes his laptop on Priya, indicating their breakup. Meanwhile, Sheldon becomes the victim of a successful Halloween prank by the guys and decides to take revenge by pranking them back. However, none of his pranks are successful; Leonard reverses his airbag prank on him; Raj does not get scared of the snake which Sheldon hid in his drawer; Howard and Bernadette pretend that Howard suffers a heart attack after Sheldon gives him an electric handshake, which actually scares him more. However he manages to finally scare Leonard by leaping out from under the couch cushions in zombie face paint after Leonard speaks with Priya.
95	8	"The Isolation Permutation"	Mark Cendrowski	Story by : Chuck Lorre & Eric Kaplan & Tara Hernandez; Teleplay by : Bill Prady & Steven Molaro & Steve Holland	November 3, 2011	3X6858	15.98
Amy becomes upset when Penny and Bernadette go shopping for bridesmaid dresses without her and cuts all contact with everyone, including Sheldon. A worried Sheldon goes over to her apartment, where he ends up cuddling her after rejecting her suggestion to have sex. This step further into their relationship makes him uncomfortable, so the following morning, he demands Leonard and Howard force Penny and Bernadette to apologize to Amy. When confronted, Penny and Bernadette reveal that they did not take Amy because she is over-enthusiastic and would have been a hindrance to their dress shopping, but feel guilty when they find out that she was upset over the snub. They go to her laboratory to apologize, but she brushes them off. Later that evening, Amy calls Sheldon and tells him that she is drunk in a liquor store parking lot, prompting him and Leonard to immediately rush there and take her home. The next morning, Penny and Bernadette again try to apologize to Amy. After a few unsuccessful attempts, Bernadette decides to end their standoff by asking Amy to be her maid of honor at her wedding. She immediately becomes excited and forgives them. The episode ends with Amy filming a dress shopping trip with Penny and Bernadette.
96	9	"The Ornithophobia Diffusion"	Mark Cendrowski	Story by : Chuck Lorre & Dave Goetsch & Anthony Del Broccolo; Teleplay by : Bill Prady & Steven Molaro & Eric Kaplan	November 10, 2011	3X6859	15.89
Leonard and Penny decide to go to the movies as friends. However Leonard refuses to exhibit the familiar deference that he formerly displayed to her as her boyfriend, insisting that they see a documentary on dams instead of a Jennifer Aniston movie and making her pay for her ticket and food. Irritated, Penny begins to flirt with Kevin, a geeky screenwriter. Leonard retaliates by flirting with a woman named Laura. Penny then sabotages Leonard's meeting with Laura, leading to a fight between Leonard and Penny before they decide to return home. Outside the apartment, they apologise to each other and Penny tells Leonard that she actually liked his new-found confidence, but he misses the opportunity to get back together with her by defaulting to his usual deference. Meanwhile, Sheldon, who suffers from ornithophobia, is upset when he sees that a Black-throated magpie-jay (incorrectly identified as a blue jay) has nested in his apartment windowsill. He tries many ways to get rid of the bird, all of which fail. Eventually he decides to shoo the bird away using a broom, but when he opens the window, the bird enters the apartment. A terrified Sheldon then asks Amy and Bernadette to get rid of the bird, but instead they encourage him to touch the bird and overcome his fear. Sheldon soon grows fond of it and decides to keep it as a pet. However, when Sheldon opens the window to shift the nest to his apartment, the bird flies away, to his dismay. The episode ends with Sheldon revealing to Leonard that he found an egg in the nest.
97	10	"The Flaming Spittoon Acquisition"	Mark Cendrowski	Story by : Chuck Lorre & Steven Molaro & Dave Goetsch; Teleplay by : Bill Prady & Jim Reynolds & Steve Holland	November 17, 2011	3X6860	15.05
When Amy visits the comic book store, she meets Stuart, who takes an immediate liking to her and asks her out, which she accepts. When Sheldon hears about this, he becomes jealous, though he denies it. To make Amy jealous, he asks Penny out, who refuses and instead tells him to reveal his feelings to Amy. Later he interrupts Amy's date with Stuart and finally admits his feelings for her. He then proposes a 31-page Relationship Agreement, which Amy finds romantic and accepts, though she regrets it later. Meanwhile, Leonard, Howard and Raj discover that a new expansion pack for Mystic Warlords of Ka'a has come out. When playing, they are unimpressed. Leonard tries to return his expansion pack but Stuart's assistant Dale refuses to take it back. Later Raj buys the Deluxe Limited Edition of the same pack which annoys Leonard, but he too ends up buying it anyway.
98	11	"The Speckerman Recurrence"	Anthony Rich	Story by : Chuck Lorre & Bill Prady & Steve Holland; Teleplay by : Steven Molaro & Eric Kaplan & Anthony Del Broccolo	December 8, 2011	3X6861	14.02
Leonard receives a Facebook message from a high school bully Jimmy Speckerman. When Leonard meets Speckerman at a bar, the latter reveals that he needs Leonard's help with his invention idea—a pair of glasses that can convert any movie into 3D—to which Leonard replies that it is impossible to make such a pair of glasses. Sheldon then stands up for Leonard and tells Speckerman that he should apologize for bullying him in high school. Later that night, Speckerman comes over to Leonard and Sheldon's apartment drunk and apologizes to Leonard. Leonard forgives him and then lets him stay for the night as he is too drunk to drive, despite Sheldon's opposition. The next morning however, Speckerman once again bullies Leonard, forcing Leonard to finally stand up to him, but Leonard and Sheldon end up being chased by Speckerman down the stairs instead. Meanwhile, the girls discuss their own encounters with bullies. Penny remembers a prank she pulled on a smart girl in high school by tying her up and leaving her in a cornfield. She feels bad for her behavior and tries to make amends by calling the people she had bullied to apologize, but they refuse to forgive her. Amy and Bernadette then tell her that she could make up for her past by doing charity. Penny decides to give away her old clothes that she no longer wants, but when the girls go to the clothing bin, they instead steal other clothes already in the bin. The next night, they return to the bin to steal more clothes, but Penny realizes that what they are doing is wrong and puts the clothes back in the bin. However, Bernadette decides to take some boots Amy showed her earlier.
99	12	"The Shiny Trinket Maneuver"	Mark Cendrowski	Story by : Chuck Lorre & Steve Holland & Tara Hernandez; Teleplay by : Bill Prady & Steven Molaro & Jim Reynolds	January 12, 2012	3X6862	16.13
Amy and Sheldon's relationship hits a snag when Sheldon refuses to appreciate the news that Amy's paper is being published in the reputed scientific journal Neuron, causing her to leave their date midway in a huff. When Penny confronts Sheldon over his behavior to his girlfriend, he replies that he is not interested in biology. Later when he discusses the issue with Leonard, Leonard tells him to buy something for Amy to make up for his behavior. He then goes with Penny to the jewelry store. Amy feels insulted initially when Penny tells her that Sheldon bought her jewelry, thinking that he is trying to buy her forgiveness, but changes her mind when she sees it is a tiara. She becomes ecstatic and kisses and hugs him, leaving him confused. Meanwhile, Howard and Bernadette's relationship also hits a snag when Bernadette reveals to Howard that she hates children and does not want to have them after they get married. This upsets Howard, who wants children of his own, and whose mother continuously nags him to give her grandchildren. He begins to reconsider his relationship with Bernadette and mulls calling off the wedding. Later Bernadette comes over to his house and tells him that they can have children of their own after they get married in respect for his feelings. However she adds that he should stay at home and take care of them while she works, to which he reluctantly agrees. Howard then suggests they use a condom before they have sex.
100	13	"The Recombination Hypothesis"	Mark Cendrowski	Story by : Chuck Lorre; Teleplay by : Bill Prady & Steven Molaro	January 19, 2012	3X6863	15.83
When Leonard and Sheldon arrive home Leonard sees Penny through her open door and asks her out, who after initial hesitation, accepts. Their date progresses smoothly until he asks her whether they will get back together. They get into a big argument, following which Leonard returns home in a huff. Later that night, Penny calls Leonard and asks him to come out of his apartment. As he does this, Penny kisses him full on the mouth and they end up having sex in her apartment. After this, they decide to pursue their relationship once again, but also decide to take things slow and pretend they are still single. Leonard finds it difficult to keep the relationship secret; when he returns to his apartment at 3 am, he is forced to lie to Sheldon (who saw him entering the apartment); the next night at the Cheesecake factory, he overplays his fake annoyance over Penny, following which the duo again engage in a heated argument. But later that night, they again have sex. After this, he asks her what they are doing, since every scenario that he plays out about them ends badly, to which she responds that it is because he over-thinks things. It is then revealed that Leonard daydreamed the entire episode. He is still outside his apartment with Sheldon. Realizing he does over-think things, he goes over to Penny's apartment and asks her out. After initial hesitation, she accepts. The episode ends with Penny preparing for her date. She imagines a scene where she marries Leonard, but is heavily pregnant, prompting her to decide to go to the drug store before the date.
101	14	"The Beta Test Initiation"	Mark Cendrowski	Story by : Chuck Lorre & Steven Molaro & Eric Kaplan; Teleplay by : Bill Prady & Dave Goetsch & Maria Ferrari	January 26, 2012	3X6864	16.13
Leonard and Penny have started dating again and they agree to an alpha test relationship—instead of them arguing with each other, they highlight each other's faults and work on them. However this goes poorly as Leonard gives Penny a huge list of her faults, while Penny retaliates by giving Leonard a huge list as well. When he tries to patch things up by taking her target shooting, he accidentally shoots himself in the shoe, barely missing his toe. Later Penny assures him that their relationship is progressing smoothly. Meanwhile, Raj buys a new iPhone 4S and falls in love with Siri as it is a female voice he can speak to without being drunk. He starts making decisions only after consulting Siri and even defends it after Kripke criticizes it for giving him erroneous answers (due to his rhotacism). Later Raj has a nightmare in which he finally meets Siri, who is a beautiful woman, but cannot talk to her. Elsewhere, Sheldon and Amy start a podcast about flags titled "Fun With Flags". Amy provides some suggestions during the podcast, which Sheldon unexpectedly accepts.
102	15	"The Friendship Contraction"	Mark Cendrowski	Story by : Chuck Lorre & Eric Kaplan & Jim Reynolds; Teleplay by : Bill Prady & Steven Molaro & Steve Holland	February 2, 2012	3X6865	16.54
Sheldon keeps Leonard awake all night with a quarterly disaster preparedness drill. The next day, Leonard refuses to take Sheldon to the dentist. Leonard then invokes Section 209 in the Roommate Agreement, which reduces his friendship with Sheldon to an acquaintance, freeing him from his obligations to Sheldon. It soon turns out that Sheldon is stranded without Leonard, as none of his other friends are willing to help him. One night, when the power goes off, Sheldon tries to win back Leonard by showing him an extensive emergency kit, but Leonard prefers to go over to Penny's apartment for wine. Sheldon comes over and offers Leonard s'mores and water (distilled from urine) if he accepts him as a friend again. Leonard refuses, but Penny feels sorry for Sheldon and advises Leonard to reconcile with him. Leonard then tells Sheldon that he would accept him as a friend again if he appreciates what he does for him once in a while. Sheldon offers to celebrate "Leonard's Day" once a year, where Leonard's achievements would be acknowledged. Leonard agrees and reconciles with Sheldon. Meanwhile, Howard is anxious as to what nickname the other astronauts are going to give him. Raj attempts to get them to choose the nickname "Rocket Man" (an Elton John song) by having Howard change his ringtone to that song and then calling him during a conference call. This backfires as during the call, Howard's mother yells that his Froot Loops are getting soggy, and he ends up with "Froot Loops" as his new moniker.
103	16	"The Vacation Solution"	Mark Cendrowski	Story by : Chuck Lorre & Anthony Del Broccolo & Tara Hernandez; Teleplay by : Bill Prady & Steven Molaro & Maria Ferrari	February 9, 2012	3X6866	16.21
After being forced to take a vacation by President Siebert, Sheldon decides to spend it working with Amy in her neurobiology lab. However he refuses to do even basic work for Amy properly, such as cleaning beakers or counting bacterial spores, and instead forces her to allow him to do brain dissection. When Amy eventually allows Sheldon to perform brain dissection, he cuts his thumb accidentally and faints after seeing it bleed. Meanwhile, Bernadette's father wants Howard to sign a prenuptial agreement. Howard, unwilling to sign any prenup, is upset that Bernadette did not tell him directly about the prenup. Later Penny confronts both Sheldon and Howard at the Cheesecake Factory bar for their behavior towards their girlfriends. The next day, Sheldon goes over to Amy's lab again to apologize for his behavior the previous day. She then invites him to work with her again, but gives him the same basic work of cleaning beakers. Meanwhile, Bernadette tells Howard that her father is insistent on him signing the prenup, at which Howard says that he would talk it out with her father. But when Bernadette reveals that her father is a far right ideologue who hates Jews, Howard decides to put off the talk until he is in space.
104	17	"The Rothman Disintegration"	Mark Cendrowski	Story by : Chuck Lorre & Bill Prady & Steve Holland; Teleplay by : Steven Molaro & Eric Kaplan & Jim Reynolds	February 16, 2012	3X6867	15.65
The deranged Professor Rothman is forced to retire, leaving his office vacant. Both Sheldon and Kripke fight for the office and bring it to the attention of President Siebert, who is not interested in listening to their argument. Sheldon and Kripke decide to settle their argument by playing a game of basketball, as both are bad at sports. However it soon becomes evident that both do not know how to play it, and the challenge is reduced to who bounces the ball highest. Sheldon wins the challenge and gets the office. He enjoys his new office until he finds out that the thermostat for the air conditioner is in another room where its occupant is experiencing hot flashes, the upstairs geology department is too noisy and the mockingbirds are "completely out-of-tune" with the wind chimes. Meanwhile, Amy gives Penny an enormous painting depicting the two of them, which Penny absolutely hates. When Bernadette sees the painting, she comments that Penny looks like a man in it, prompting Penny to remove it from her wall. Unfortunately, Amy finds out that Penny removed the painting and becomes upset, thinking that her friendship with Penny is one-sided. Penny consoles Amy by lying that she removed the painting from the wall because Bernadette was jealous that she was not in the painting. Later Penny hangs the painting on the fourth wall.
105	18	"The Werewolf Transformation"	Mark Cendrowski	Story by : Chuck Lorre & Todd Craig & Gary Torvinen; Teleplay by : Bill Prady & Steven Molaro & Jim Reynolds & Maria Ferrari	February 23, 2012	3X6868	16.20
Sheldon's regular barber Mr. D'Onofrio has been hospitalized in a coma and he refuses to get his hair cut from his nephew Angelo. Penny offers to cut Sheldon's hair as she used to cut her brother's hair, but he refuses. A week later, Sheldon has still not got his haircut and on Penny's advice, decides to relax his regimented lifestyle. He begins to do things he never used to do before, like wearing his Tuesday pajamas on Thursday night and playing bongos at 3 am. This wakes Leonard and Penny, who plead with Sheldon to stop playing the bongos, to no avail, and he leaves the apartment still playing them. The next morning, they find him asleep on Amy's couch. With Amy's vote of confidence, Sheldon agrees to let Penny cut his hair. Sheldon is impressed with the way Penny had cut his hair, but when she is trimming his neck, she shaves the back of his head accidentally. Meanwhile, Howard goes to Houston to prepare for his space mission. He confides to Bernadette via webcam his experiences in training, which involved vomiting during Zero-G training and having a horrible survival test. Bernadette feels pity for Howard and rushes to Houston, where she quickly finds out that his mother is already there to take care of him.
106	19	"The Weekend Vortex"	Mark Cendrowski	Story by : Chuck Lorre & Bill Prady & Tara Hernandez; Teleplay by : Steven Molaro & Eric Kaplan & Steve Holland	March 8, 2012	3X6869	15.04
Raj suggests that the guys spend the entire weekend together in a gaming marathon of the new Star Wars online game. However Sheldon already promised Amy that he would attend her Aunt Flora's 93rd birthday party and meet her family during the weekend and reluctantly decides not to take part in the marathon, but still tries to convince Penny to make Amy change her mind. Sheldon goes with Amy, but also brings his laptop so that he can play with the guys remotely. Amy gets peeved at Sheldon and tells him to return to his apartment if playing with the guys is more important than honoring his commitment to her, which he does. Later Raj gets furious at Howard when he brings Bernadette to the marathon after being forced to include her. Meanwhile, Amy, having returned from her aunt's birthday party, confides her feelings about Sheldon to Penny, who then tells her to create a scene at her boyfriend's apartment. She does this, with Penny too admonishing Sheldon for being a bad boyfriend. At this, Raj goes ballistic and yells about how different the group was before Leonard, Howard and Sheldon got girlfriends, how he is the only one in their group who does not have a girlfriend. The girls immediately leave the apartment and the guys get back to their marathon. The next morning, the marathon ends when Howard's mother bangs on the apartment door demanding an explanation for Howard's weekend-long absence and forcing him to return home.
107	20	"The Transporter Malfunction"	Mark Cendrowski	Story by : Chuck Lorre & Bill Prady & Maria Ferrari; Teleplay by : Steven Molaro & Jim Reynolds & Steve Holland	March 29, 2012	3X6870	13.96
After Sheldon complains about Penny's constant mooching of their food, she buys him and Leonard each a mint-condition vintage Star Trek transporter from 1975 with the residual check from her hemorrhoid commercial. She is disappointed when both refuse to take them out of their boxes since they want to preserve the toy's value. That night, Sheldon has a dream where his Spock action figure tells him to open his transporter and play with it. When Sheldon does this, he breaks his transporter accidentally. He then exchanges his broken toy for Leonard's toy, figuring that he will never find out since he does not plan to open his. Later Sheldon has a nightmare where his Spock action figure chastises him for switching the two transporters. When Leonard decides to play with his toy since it is a gift from his girlfriend, Sheldon admits to breaking his toy and switching it with Leonard's. Meanwhile, faced with the prospect of attending Howard's wedding alone, Raj tells his parents to find a suitable girl for him. He meets the prospective bride Lakshmi in a restaurant and both hit it off immediately. It soon turns out that Lakshmi is a lesbian and agreed to meet Raj as it is difficult to come out in Indian culture, but nevertheless decides to marry him as she thinks he is gay. Raj too contemplates marrying her, despite the fact that he is never going to have sex with her, and rebuffs Howard's advice to find some other girl. Finally, Howard and Bernadette give Raj a Yorkie puppy to cheer him up and make him forget about Lakshmi.
108	21	"The Hawking Excitation"	Mark Cendrowski	Story by : Bill Prady & Steven Molaro & Steve Holland; Teleplay by : Chuck Lorre & Eric Kaplan & Maria Ferrari	April 5, 2012	3X6871	13.29
Howard is hired to maintain Stephen Hawking's motorized wheelchair while he is guest-lecturing at Caltech. He plans to introduce Sheldon to Hawking (Sheldon considers Hawking his idol) until Sheldon insults him yet again about his lack of a doctorate. Sheldon pleads with Howard to introduce him to Hawking, to no avail. He then asks him to give his paper on the Higgs boson to Hawking, to which he agrees, but only if he does several embarrassing tasks for him. Howard then asks him to give him a compliment about his job. Sheldon replies that he never said that Howard is bad at his job, he just feels that his job is not worth doing. Howard accepts his backhanded compliment and reveals that he had already given Hawking his paper three days ago and that he wants to meet him. Hawking is very impressed with Sheldon's paper, but then mentions that he had made an arithmetic mistake as a result of which the entire paper is wrong. At this, a shocked Sheldon faints.
109	22	"The Stag Convergence"	Peter Chakos	Story by : Billy Prady & Steve Holland & Eric Kaplan; Teleplay by : Chuck Lorre & Steven Molaro & Jim Reynolds	April 26, 2012	3X6872	12.65
The guys are planning Howard's bachelor party. Howard tells them that no strippers should be hired for the party, as he had promised Bernadette. Stuart, Kripke and Wil Wheaton are also invited. At the party, everyone offers a toast. A drunk Raj talks about his friendship with Howard revealing various and sundry things about Howard. Wheaton records Raj's entire speech and uploads it onto YouTube. When Bernadette, who does not know about Howard's perverted and womanizing past, sees the video, she becomes extremely upset and becomes unsure about marrying a man that she does not seem to know. She even becomes upset at Penny because she was the one who introduced her to Howard, despite knowing about Howard's past. She confines herself to her bedroom, not returning Howard's calls. Howard gives Penny a message to pass on to Bernadette saying that he is sorry, that he is as disgusted by his past as she is and credits her for reforming him, which reduces Penny to tears, moved by the genuineness of his apology. When Bernadette hears this, she immediately forgives him, though she is still mad at him, and adds that the wedding will still take place. The episode ends with Leonard wanting to have sex with Penny in the laundry room, which she refuses.
110	23	"The Launch Acceleration"	Mark Cendrowski	Story by : Chuck Lorre & Steven Molaro & Jim Reynolds; Teleplay by : Bill Prady & Steve Holland & Maria Ferrari	May 3, 2012	3X6873	13.91
Howard receives a call from NASA saying that his mission to the International Space Station has been cancelled due to problems with the Soyuz capsule during a pressurization test. He is ecstatic as he has actually become terrified of possibly dying in space and looks forward to his wedding. However, he later receives another call from NASA saying that he will be sent to space after all as they want his telescope on the International Space Station, though his launch date will be pushed up to the Friday before his wedding. He decides to talk to Bernadette's father to postpone the wedding. To his surprise, Mike strongly approves of him going to space and reveals that he did not think that he was suitable for Bernadette until he heard about the space mission. He also tries to assuage Howard's fear of dying in space, mentioning that Bernadette can always find someone else if he does not return. Meanwhile, Leonard and Penny decide to take their "beta test" relationship to the next level by having sex. However, Leonard accidentally proposes to Penny during sex as a result of which Penny becomes extremely upset. After unsuccessfully trying to pacify her, he leaves her apartment. Later, when the couple meet each other in the apartment stairwell, Penny says no to Leonard's wedding proposal, though they will still date. Elsewhere, Amy tries to use transference to increase Sheldon's feelings for her by making him happy using his love for various other topics (his mother's cooking, video games etc.). Amy's actions seem to work on Sheldon who is not happy about it but makes no attempt to stop her.
111	24	"The Countdown Reflection"	Mark Cendrowski	Story by : Bill Prady & Eric Kaplan & Steve Holland; Teleplay by : Chuck Lorre & Steven Molaro & Jim Reynolds	May 10, 2012	3X6874	13.72
Howard and his two fellow astronauts Dimitri Rezinov and Mike Massimino are in the Soyuz capsule, awaiting lift-off to the International Space Station from Kazakhstan. Nervous and not looking forward to the launch, Howard begins to reflect on the last couple of days, revealing that he married Bernadette before he left. When Bernadette receives a necklace from Howard with a star pendant on it which he plans to take with him to space, she tells him that they need to get married before he goes to space. They decide to get married in City Hall that very afternoon with only their friends as guests. Amy is devastated that her position as Maid of Honor has been reduced to nothing, but is allowed to wear the dress she bought to City Hall. Unfortunately, they do not get married that day as there are too many other couples in front of them. Raj then suggests that they get married on the roof of Leonard, Sheldon and Penny's apartment building on Sunday morning, which will coincide with the Google satellite taking new photographs of Pasadena, with himself, Leonard, Sheldon, Penny and Amy as ministers. The wedding takes place successfully. While Howard and Bernadette exchange their vows, the camera pulls back from the apartment roof - showing a glimpse of Mrs. Wolowitz - and then pulls back further to a view of the planet Earth. The episode ends with Howard being launched into space. Everyone nervously watches the space launch from Leonard and Sheldon's apartment. Bernadette takes Raj's hand, Penny takes Leonard's hand, and a very surprised Amy has her hand taken by Sheldon who wishes Howard well with the words "Boldly go, Howard Wolowitz".

== Release ==
=== Critical reception ===
The fifth season received critical acclaim. On Rotten Tomatoes, 100% of eight critics gave the season a positive review, with an average rating of 8.4/10.

Oliver Sava of The A.V. Club gave the season a B+ rating. He described Raj as the "weak link of the show" as he has not "[evolved] like the rest of the cast" and is "trapped in season one mode". Sava gave high ratings to episodes where Raj did not feature prominently, such as "The Pulled Groin Extrapolation" or "The Russian Rocket Reaction" and described "The Wiggly Finger Catalyst" (an episode focusing on Raj) as "one of the series' worst", giving it a D+ rating. Sava's favorite relationship on the series is between Amy and Penny.

Jenna Busch of IGN disliked the previous season but said that season 5 "is far more balanced"; Busch gave season 5 episodes ratings between 5.5 and 9, with an average rating of 8.0. She also noted that the show has "matured" by including other women in the main cast.

Tom Gliatto from People gave the season 3 out of 4 stars, stating that it is "bright and obvious as a cartoon, yet written with a clean, precise patter of jokes".

=== Awards ===
At the 64th Primetime Emmy Awards, The Big Bang Theory was nominated for Outstanding Comedy Series, but Modern Family on ABC won. The show was also nominated for Outstanding Technical Direction, Camerawork, Video Control for a Series and Outstanding Multi-Camera Picture Editing For A Comedy Series.

Jim Parsons (Sheldon Cooper) was nominated for Outstanding Lead Actor in a Comedy Series for "The Werewolf Transformation", but lost out to Jon Cryer. Mayim Bialik (Amy Farrah Fowler) was nominated for Outstanding Supporting Actress in a Comedy Series for "The Shiny Trinket Maneuver", but lost out to Julie Bowen.

=== Distribution ===
The season premiered on CBS on September 22, 2011. It was released on DVD with an aspect ratio of 16:9 format on September 11, 2011, in Region 1, on September 2, 2012, in Region 2 and October 3, 2012, in Region 4. The episodes can also be purchased on Amazon Video or the iTunes store in the US.

== Broadcast ==
=== U.S. Nielsen ratings ===
Viewership and ratings per episode of The Big Bang Theory season 5
No.	Title	Air date	Rating/share (18–49)	Viewers (millions)
1	"The Skank Reflex Analysis"	September 22, 2011	4.9/15	14.30
2	"The Infestation Hypothesis"	September 22, 2011	5.1/14	14.94
3	"The Pulled Groin Extrapolation"	September 29, 2011	4.9/15	14.74
4	"The Wiggly Finger Catalyst"	October 6, 2011	4.5/14	13.92
5	"The Russian Rocket Reaction"	October 13, 2011	4.6/14	13.58
6	"The Rhinitis Revelation"	October 20, 2011	5.1/16	14.93
7	"The Good Guy Fluctuation"	October 27, 2011	4.6/13	14.54
8	"The Isolation Permutation"	November 3, 2011	5.4/16	15.98
9	"The Ornithophobia Diffusion"	November 10, 2011	5.3/15	15.89
10	"The Flaming Spittoon Acquisition"	November 17, 2011	5.3/15	15.05
11	"The Speckerman Recurrence"	December 8, 2011	4.6/14	14.02
12	"The Shiny Trinket Maneuver"	January 12, 2012	5.3/15	16.13
13	"The Recombination Hypothesis"	January 19, 2012	5.3/15	15.83
14	"The Beta Test Initiation"	January 26, 2012	5.5/16	16.13
15	"The Friendship Contraction"	February 2, 2012	5.5/16	16.54
16	"The Vacation Solution"	February 9, 2012	5.6/16	16.21
17	"The Rothman Disintegration"	February 16, 2012	5.1/15	15.65
18	"The Werewolf Transformation"	February 23, 2012	5.3/16	16.20
19	"The Weekend Vortex"	March 8, 2012	5.1/15	15.04
20	"The Transporter Malfunction"	March 29, 2012	4.7/15	13.96
21	"The Hawking Excitation"	April 5, 2012	4.4/15	13.29
22	"The Stag Convergence"	April 26, 2012	4.1/13	12.65
23	"The Launch Acceleration"	May 3, 2012	4.7/16	13.91
24	"The Countdown Reflection"	May 10, 2012	4.4/15	13.72

=== Canadian broadcast ===
In Canada, The Big Bang Theory aired on CTV Television Network. The season premiere ("The Skank Reflex Analysis") garnered 3.72 million viewers and the finale was watched by 4.04 million households. Most episodes were the most watched programme in Canada that week. The highest rating in season 5 was 4.05 million, for "The Infestation Hypothesis", and the lowest rating was 3.17 million, for "The Stag Convergence".
