= The Roommate Transmogrification =

- The Big Bang Theory episode
- Episode no.: Season 4 Episode 24
- Directed by: Mark Cendrowski
- Story by: Chuck Lorre, Steven Molaro &; Eddie Gorodetsky
- Teleplay by: Bill Prady, Eric Kaplan &; Jim Reynolds
- Original air date: May 19, 2011

Guest appearances
- Aarti Mann as Priya Koothrappalli; Carol Ann Susi as Mrs. Wolowitz; Brian George as Dr. V.M. Koothrappali; Alice Amter as Mrs. Koothrappalli

Episode chronology
← Previous "The Engagement Reaction"	Next → "The Skank Reflex Analysis"
- The Big Bang Theory season 4

"The Roommate Transmogrification" is the fourth season finale of the television series The Big Bang Theory that first aired on CBS on May 19, 2011. It is the twenty-fourth episode of the fourth season of the series and the eighty-seventh episode overall. Aarti Mann continues her recurring role of Priya Koothrappali while Brian George and Alice Amter reprise their roles of Dr. and Mrs. Koothrappali.

== Plot ==
During another night out at the Cheesecake Factory, the guys and Penny make fun of Leonard because of his lactose intolerance. However, when Bernadette announces that her dissertation has been accepted, earning her a Ph.D. and a well-paid job, Penny seizes his chance and starts to mock Howard with the other guys, degrading him for being the only non-doctor in their group. Later, Bernadette buys Howard an expensive Rolex watch as a present and tells him to "let her worry about the money", a comment that deeply disturbs Howard.

Meanwhile, Leonard's and Priya's noisy and "astronomically inaccurate" sexual roleplay - she wears Raj's Lieutenant Uhura costume - in his apartment disturbs Raj and he leaves to spend the night at Sheldon's apartment. When Leonard finds Raj in his bed the next morning, he apologizes and proposes that Raj moves in with Sheldon until Priya finds her own place. Raj likes the idea and moves in after Sheldon's usual bureaucratic procedures (including a modified "temporary roommate agreement" and a will).

Raj then prepares a fancy dinner to ingratiate himself with Sheldon, who is delighted. Penny comes over to ask for their Wi-Fi password, because she does not want to pay for her own, and then stays for dinner. When she and Raj both get drunk from the wine Raj serves, Sheldon gets annoyed and goes to bed. Penny then admits that she should not have broken up with Leonard, and tells Raj that she would be "on" him if they were not friends.

Priya receives a video call from her parents and tells Leonard to hide in the bedroom, because she still does not want them to know that she is dating him. Leonard overhears the Koothrappalis talking about Priya moving back to India the following month. When he storms back into the room to confront her, he reveals to her parents that they are in a relationship, justifying that her moving back to India would certainly mean they are breaking up, leaving it moot if her parents know.

At the end of the episode, Sheldon discovers Leonard sleeping on the couch at their apartment after his confrontation with Priya, just before Howard shows up after a fight with Bernadette over the watch. Penny wakes up in Leonard's room and is horrified to be naked with Raj and realizes she hooked up with him. She tells him not to say anything about the night before and tries to sneak out of the apartment with Raj wrapped in a sheet, only for the other men to see them. Penny just states that it is "not what it looks like", leaving Sheldon, Leonard and Howard confused.

== Reception ==
On the night of its first broadcast on May 19, 2011, the episode was watched by 11.30 million households. The episode was the fourth least watched episode of the season, despite it being the season finale.

IGN's Jenna Busch gave the fourth-season finale a positive review stating that "For the most part, the episode was strong". Busch did, however, criticise the cliff-hanger of the episode by stating: "a Penny/Raj hookup just seemed a bit off. Even if you were fine with that, the ending still seemed kind of soft to me". Busch then complimented the show's season by saying "there have been so many great moments throughout this season. Even when I've critiqued the show, there has always been something to love. I can't wait for next season to start".

Carla Day from TV Fanatic gave the episode an extremely positive review by saying "I found the installment and each of the stories to be hilarious and/or to propel the characters forward. Overall, as a season finale, it gave me the laughs I expect and left me sitting in anticipation for the show to return in September". Day did give the cliff-hanger a mixed review by writing "At first, I thought it was pretty funny, but now, I think it is just sad" and "I'm going to wait until the show returns and I can see how it all plays out before I decide if I like this new entanglement or not". Day then praised the season as a whole and complimented the three new female characters by saying "Overall, I thoroughly enjoyed this season, in particular, the growth of our nerdy friends and the addition of Bernadette, Amy and even Priya to the mix".
