= The Infestation Hypothesis =

- The Big Bang Theory episode
- Episode no.: Season 5 Episode 2
- Directed by: Mark Cendrowski
- Story by: Chuck Lorre; Jim Reynolds; Steve Holland
- Teleplay by: Bill Prady; Steven Molaro; Maria Ferrari
- Production code: 3X6852
- Original air date: September 22, 2011

Guest appearances
- Aarti Mann as Priya Koothrappali; Brian George as Dr. V. M. Koorthrappali; Alice Amter as Mrs. Koothrappalli

Episode chronology
← Previous "The Skank Reflex Analysis"	Next → "The Pulled Groin Extrapolation"
- The Big Bang Theory season 5

"The Infestation Hypothesis" is the second episode of the fifth season of The Big Bang Theory that first aired on CBS on September 22, 2011. It is the 89th episode overall. In it, Sheldon (Jim Parsons) becomes worried when Penny (Kaley Cuoco) acquires a new chair, while Leonard (Johnny Galecki) tries to make his long distance relationship with Priya (Aarti Mann) work. The episode was watched by nearly 12 million viewers in the U.S. and received mixed reviews.

== Plot ==
Leonard and Priya, who has returned to India, continue their relationship with dinner dates via Skype. The romantic atmosphere annoys Sheldon, who then hangs out with Penny in her apartment. Sheldon sits in Penny's new chair and compliments it, but when he learns that she found it on the street becomes paranoid about getting "chair lice" as he has mysophobia. He unsuccessfully attempts to get her to remove the chair. He even talks Amy into talking to Penny about the chair. Penny is upset and claims Sheldon is "manipulating" Amy; Amy quickly apologizes and sits in the chair. Something in the chair bites her and the girls run from the apartment; with Penny swearing Amy to secrecy. Later, Howard and Raj discover the chair outside the building and decide to bring it to Sheldon and Leonard's apartment so Raj does not have to sit on the floor.

While discussing Leonard and Priya's long distance relationship, Howard suggests they engage in cybersex. During their next date, Leonard and Priya begin to take their clothes off, but the screen freezes as Priya is about to remove her shirt. Howard later finds a pair of mechanical mouths that simulate kissing: when one person puts their lips on one mouth, the other mouth copies the movements. Leonard is reluctant to use the device, especially after Howard and Raj demonstrate using it. Later, Leonard begins to talk dirty to Priya before realizing that her parents are there, listening to the conversation.

== Reception ==
=== Ratings ===
"The Infestation Hypothesis" aired on CBS on September 22, 2011 at 8:30 p.m., immediately after the season premiere ("The Skank Reflex Analysis") aired. The episode received 11.94 million viewers, 0.64 million more than the season premiere. "The Pulled Groin Extrapolation" aired the following week and received 0.20 million viewers less than "The Infestation Hypothesis". It received a Nielsen rating of 5.1/14 from viewers aged 18–49, in the show's target demographic. It aired alongside the series premiere of Parks and Recreation on NBC, which garnered only 4.11 million viewers and a Nielsen rating aged 18–49 of 2.1/6. The episode was the most watched that night.

In Canada, the episode aired at the same time on CTV Total. It was watched by 4.053 million viewers, the second most watched program that night. 3.718 million households watched "The Skank Reflex Analysis", so "The Infestation Hypothesis" had more viewers than the season premiere.

The episode aired on Nine Network in Australia on October 10, 2011 and had 1.606 million viewers. Due to a ratings error, however, the 1.606 million was averaged with the ratings for the repeat of the episode the following night, and decreased to 1.321 million viewers. Beating the series premiere, the episode was most watched that night and third most watched that week, although the error lead to the episode being mistakenly given a weekly ranking of fifth.

In the United Kingdom, the episode aired a week after "The Skank Reflex Analysis". According to BARB, the episode got 1.115 million viewers on E4 and on E4 +1, 0.297 million viewers. It was ranked second and fifth on the channels, respectively. Overall, the show had 1.312 million views when it first aired and a cable ranking of seventh.

=== Reviews ===
You are aware that your ritualistic knocking behavior is symptomatic of obsessive compulsive disorder.

— Amy talking to Sheldon: Oliver Sava of The A.V. Club pointed out the quote as being the first explicit reference to Sheldon having a mental disorder.

Oliver Sava of The A.V. Club gave the episode a C but commented that the episode was "composed of two B-plots". Sava noted that the episode marked "the first time that someone has explicitly connected [Sheldon's] behavior to a mental disorder", when Amy comments on Sheldon's knocking pattern and described Raj and Howard's kissing scene as "bizarre".

The TV Critic rated the episode 52 out of 100. The scenes with Priya and Leonard were complimented despite the "pretty predictable plot" and the fact that "the long distance relationship is obviously doomed" and contrasting with Sava's review, the critic described Howard and Raj's kissing as "in its own way perfect". However, the Sheldon phobia plot was regarded as "tedious" and the episode overall was critiqued for not advancing the overall storyline of the show.

Jenna Busch of IGN rated the episode 8.5 out of 10. She said the "Penny/Sheldon scene before the discovery" was "fantastic" and enjoyed the relationship between Amy and Penny developing.

Carla Day from TV Fanatic rated the episode 4.5 out of 5. Penny and Sheldon was described as the "best relationship on the show". Character growth from both Sheldon and Amy were noticed: Sheldon goes to Amy, not Leonard, for help and Amy asks Sheldon for a kiss. According to Day, the kissing between Howard and Raj was "hysterical" but the "Skype sex scenes... really weren't that funny".
