= The Flaming Spittoon Acquisition =

- The Big Bang Theory episode
- Episode no.: Season 5 Episode 10
- Directed by: Mark Cendrowski
- Story by: Chuck Lorre; Steven Molaro; Dave Goetsch
- Teleplay by: Bill Prady; Jim Reynolds; Steve Holland
- Original air date: November 17, 2011

Guest appearances
- Kevin Sussman as Stuart; Josh Brener as Dale

Episode chronology
| ← Previous "The Ornithophobia Diffusion" | Next → "The Speckerman Recurrence" |
- The Big Bang Theory season 5

"The Flaming Spittoon Acquisition" is the tenth episode of the fifth season of The Big Bang Theory that first aired on CBS on November 17, 2011. It is the ninety-seventh episode overall.

== Plot ==
At the comic book store, Stuart is introduced to Amy, who accompanies the guys but is bored by comic books. Stuart is attracted to her and proceeds to ask Leonard about the current state of Sheldon and Amy's relationship. He then gets Leonard to check if Sheldon is fine with him asking her out. Sheldon says the question is moot, assuming that a renowned neurobiologist like Amy would never be interested in a guy like Stuart anyway. When Leonard and Sheldon return to the comic book store, they meet Dale, who has replaced Stuart while the latter is out having coffee with a girl. Sheldon, knowing that the girl must be Amy, conceals his true feelings and repeatedly states that he does not care, although actions like friending Stuart on Facebook to spy on him and asking Penny out on a date to make Amy jealous suggest otherwise. After talking to Penny, he interrupts Amy and Stuart during a movie to change the paradigm of their relationship. He hesitantly asks Amy, "I would not object to us no longer characterizing you as not my girlfriend." Amy requests that he not use a multiple negative in his proposal. Sheldon then asks her to be his girlfriend, which she says yes, then Sheldon leaves so Amy and Stuart can finish their date. When she returns home after, Sheldon is waiting in her apartment with a "Relationship Agreement".

Meanwhile, the guys find out that a new expansion pack for Mystic Warlords of Ka'a called "Wild West and Witches" has come out, which they initially turn down because of its theme and the price, but eventually buy after an argument about who would win in a fight between Billy the Kid and the Wizard of the North. Leonard later tries to return the new Mystic Warlords of Ka'a expansion pack, but Raj goes out to buy the "deluxe limited edition" of the pack in a collector's tin. Leonard once again turns it down, but then ends up buying it, while being furious at himself for doing so.

== Reception ==
On the night of its first broadcast on November 17, 2011, the episode was watched by 15.05 million households.

The episode received mostly positive reviews from critics. Carla Day of TVFanatic.com praised the development of Sheldon and Amy's relationship stating "This new relationship is bound to have plenty of funny situations ahead of it". they also commented that "Sheldon is... Sheldon. Despite some personal growth, he is fundamentally still the same. He has his quirks, rules, and personal boundaries that may, at times, be stretched but aren't going to change - unless it's about Facebook. His friending of Stuart to get the scoop on his date with Amy was surprising but brilliant".

Some reviews were less positive. Oliver Sava of The A.V. Club gave the episode a C and praised the scenes involving the three regular female characters, stating, "The best scenes this episode are of the three ladies in Penny's apartment. The chemistry between the three actresses has become much more captivating than the men, and it feels like the writers are still exploring new ground with the women." Sava did, however, state that the character of Amy 'deserves better' than Sheldon.
