= The Skank Reflex Analysis =

- The Big Bang Theory episode
- Episode no.: Season 5 Episode 1
- Directed by: Mark Cendrowski
- Story by: Eric Kaplan; Maria Ferrari; Anthony Del Broccolo
- Teleplay by: Chuck Lorre; Bill Prady; Steven Molaro
- Production code: 3X6851
- Original air date: September 22, 2011

Guest appearance
- Christine Baranski as Dr. Beverly Hofstadter

Episode chronology
← Previous "The Roommate Transmogrification"	Next → "The Infestation Hypothesis"
- The Big Bang Theory season 5

"The Skank Reflex Analysis" is the first episode of the fifth season of The Big Bang Theory that first aired on CBS on September 22, 2011. It is the 88th episode overall.

== Plot ==
The day after Penny and Raj slept together and Leonard found out that Priya is moving back to India, the men have a tense lunch at the cafeteria where Howard and Leonard are both annoyed that Raj had sex with Penny, and Raj tries to defend himself by saying that they are in love. Leonard reveals to Howard that Raj used to like Bernadette, infuriating Howard further. When Bernadette finds out, she angrily confronts Raj at his apartment. During the tirade, Raj asks her if she thinks he has a shot with Penny; she retorts that he does and that any woman would be lucky to have him.

Sheldon calls Leonard's mother to advise Leonard on his problems and the two converse through video chat. Leonard explains that while he does not want to get back with Penny, he cannot deal that she slept with one of his friends, and is also confused because of his uncertain relationship status with Priya. His mother, despite her being an expert in psychology, parenting and child development, has no advice other than "Buck up, sissy pants".

Amy arrives at Penny's apartment and tries to console her. Wanting to avoid awkward encounters with Leonard and the others, Penny asks to sleep over at Amy's apartment for the night. Raj finds out that Penny is staying there through Amy's Facebook page and shows up. Raj asks Penny out on a date, but Penny tells him that having sex with him was a mistake and that she wishes to just remain friends. Raj reveals that the previous night, he had ejaculated prematurely; so the two did not technically actually have sex. She agrees not to tell anyone about this.

During a paintball match against members of other Caltech departments, Sheldon appoints himself as captain of the guys' team. With the lack of enthusiasm apparent among the team due to the recent events, Sheldon, blaming himself, sacrifices himself to the geology department and the gang rush out to avenge him, thereby claiming a victory.

As the guys celebrate, they are interrupted by Penny, who announces her plans to move back to Nebraska, because of her failing acting career and her fractured relationship with the guys. As Leonard tries to dissuade her, she is interrupted by a phone call from an agent who tells her she got a part in a hemorrhoid cream commercial. She changes her mind and stays in Pasadena because she is going to "be a star".

The episode concludes with everybody watching the commercial.

== Reception ==
=== Ratings ===
On the night of its first broadcast on September 22, 2011, the episode was watched by 14.30 million U.S. households and a Nielsen rating of 4.9/15. The episode was watched by 3.72 million Canadian viewers and had a weekly ranking of 3.

In Australia, the episode first aired on October 10, 2011. Due to an error in ratings, the weekly rankings for the episode were averaged with the repeat of the episode the following night. The false ratings showed the episode having 1.225 million viewers and ranking 11th. In reality, the episode had 1.51 million viewers and ranked first.

In the UK, the episode aired on November 3, 2011 and had 1.08 million viewers on E4, ranking it 5th on the channel that week. It had an E4 +1 ranking of 9 as 0.258 million viewers watched it on that channel. Overall, it had 1.339 million viewers.

=== Reviews ===
The TV Critic rated the episode 54 out of 100. Oliver Sava of The A.V. Club gave the episode a B+. Jenna Busch of IGN rated it 9/10 and wrote that "for me, the strongest scenes were between Amy Farrah Fowler and Penny."
