= The Shiny Trinket Maneuver =

- The Big Bang Theory episode
- Episode no.: Season 5 Episode 12
- Directed by: Mark Cendrowski
- Story by: Chuck Lorre; Steve Holland; Tara Hernandez
- Teleplay by: Bill Prady; Steven Molaro; Jim Reynolds
- Production code: 3X6862
- Original air date: January 12, 2012
- Running time: 21 minutes

Guest appearance
- Carol Ann Susi as Mrs. Wolowitz

Episode chronology
← Previous "The Speckerman Recurrence"	Next → "The Recombination Hypothesis"
- The Big Bang Theory season 5

"The Shiny Trinket Maneuver" is the 12th episode of the fifth season of the US sitcom The Big Bang Theory and the 99th episode of the show overall. It first aired on CBS on January 12, 2012.

In the episode, Amy gets upset with Sheldon after he does not appreciate her good news, and Howard reconsiders his relationship with Bernadette after he finds out she does not like children.

== Plot ==
On a date, Amy tells Sheldon that her paper will be published in Neuron, a prestigious scientific journal; Sheldon does not acknowledge her good news, distracted by his Twitter account. While Amy excuses herself to the bathroom; Penny explains to Sheldon that Amy is upset that he did not appreciate her accomplishment. Later, Sheldon discusses the situation with Leonard, who suggests he buys her something to apologize. Sheldon visits a jewelry store with Penny. Though he is distracted by a pocket watch, Penny urges him to focus and he buys Amy a tiara. When Amy is told Sheldon has bought her jewelry, she calls him shallow; she then realizes it is a tiara and hugs Sheldon, overjoyed.

Meanwhile, Howard and Bernadette prepare a magic show for a birthday party while discussing children: Bernadette is not particularly fond of them, while Howard has always planned to have kids (partially to appease his mother). At the party, Bernadette gets annoyed with several children who interrupt Howard's performance; the performance ends badly when milk is poured down the front of Howard's pants due to Bernadette pouring the milk from the wrong pitcher. Bernadette reveals that she had to care for her misbehaving younger siblings as a child; hence her dislike for children. A dejected Howard discusses the situation with Leonard, Raj and his mother. Bernadette comes over to Howard's house and suggests that he could take care of the children while she continues working. He agrees and pulls out a condom.

== Production ==
At the 64th Primetime Emmy Awards, Mayim Bialik received a nomination for Primetime Emmy Award for Outstanding Supporting Actress in a Comedy Series. She submitted this episode for consideration, saying that although she did not think it was her best episode, many people felt she should submit it.

== Reception ==
=== Ratings ===
The episode was first broadcast on January 12, 2012 at 8 p.m. on CBS, and was watched by 16.13 million Americans. The episode had a Nielsen rating of 5.3/15 within the age group 18-49. In Canada on CTV Television Network, the episode aired on the same night and received 3.566 million viewers, making it the most watched TV programme that week.

On Nine Network in Australia, the episode aired on February 13, 2012; 1.347 million households watched the show, making it the fifth most watched show that night. In the UK, the episode aired on March 29, 2012, with 0.990 million viewers on E4 and 0.309 million viewers on E4 +1. It was ranked tenth that week by BARB.

=== Reviews ===
Oliver Sava of The A.V. Club gave the episode a B+ rating, describing Sheldon as "at his best", the comedy relating to relationships as "organic and personal" and claiming that Raj being a homosexual is a possibility. R.L. Shaffer from IGN rated the episode 8 out of 10, enjoying the plot between Sheldon and Amy; Shaffer described the relationship between Howard and Bernadette as "a bit strange" but said "it resulted in a some [sic] pretty amusing jokes".
