= The Isolation Permutation =

- The Big Bang Theory episode
- Episode no.: Season 5 Episode 8
- Directed by: Mark Cendrowski
- Story by: Chuck Lorre; Eric Kaplan; Tara Hernandez
- Teleplay by: Bill Prady; Steven Molaro; Steve Holland
- Production code: 3X6858
- Original air date: November 3, 2011
- Running time: 22 minutes

Episode chronology
← Previous "The Good Guy Fluctuation"	Next → "The Ornithophobia Diffusion"
- The Big Bang Theory season 5

"The Isolation Permutation" is the eighth episode of the fifth season of the American sitcom The Big Bang Theory and the 95th episode of the show overall. It first aired on CBS on November 3, 2011.

In the episode, Amy becomes upset when Penny and Bernadette go dress shopping without her.

== Plot ==
Bernadette and Penny are shopping for bridesmaid dresses; Howard inadvertently mentions this in front of Amy, who is upset that they did not invite her.

Sheldon is unable to contact Amy: she does not answer Facebook messages, video chats or any other form of communication Sheldon tries to use. He and Leonard go round to her house and finds her singing "Everybody Hurts" while playing the harp. Leonard knocks on the door and leaves, leaving Sheldon alone with Amy. She wants physical intimacy with Sheldon and after negotiating, Sheldon reluctantly cuddles with her.

The following day, Sheldon angrily confronts Howard and Leonard, telling them to "get [their] women in line". They talk to Penny and Bernadette, who explain that Amy was over-enthusiastic about being a bridesmaid, making her an inconvenience. Penny and Bernadette apologize to Amy, but Amy, who has a history of being turned away by supposed friends, is still upset. She makes an analogy involving a brain's hemispheres, comparing Bernadette to the left hemisphere, Penny to the right hemisphere and herself to a brain tumour. Later, Sheldon receives a phone call telling him that Amy is drunk in a parking lot. He and Leonard go and take her home.

The next morning, Penny and Bernadette apologize again and offer Amy the chance to be the maid of honor at Bernadette's wedding. She is very excited about this. In the final scene, Amy records the three of them dress shopping.

== Reception ==
=== Ratings ===
On the night of its first broadcast in the US on November 3, 2011 at 8 p.m., the episode received 15.98 million viewers on CBS, and a 5.4/16 Nielsen rating. It beat the other shows in its timeslot: The X Factor received 11.64 million views on Fox; Community was watched by 3.84 million on NBC; The Vampire Diaries got 3.51 million viewers on The CW and 5.31 households watched Charlie's Angels on ABC.

On CBS, the episode was most watched that night. At 8:30 p.m., Rules of Engagement received 11.81 million views; Grey's Anatomy was watched by 9.52 million at 9 p.m. and The Mentalist garnered 13.66 million viewers at 10 p.m.

In Canada, the episode aired at the same time and was most watched that week, receiving 3.762 million viewers on CTV Total. In Australia, the episode aired on November 14, 2011 and received 1.359 million viewers, ranking it second most watched that night.

In the UK, the episode aired on December 15, 2011 and had 1.176 million viewers on E4, ranking it second on the channel that week. On E4 +1, 0.330 million households watched the episode, ranking it third on the channel and giving the episode 1.506 million viewers overall. It ranked seventh on digital television overall.

=== Reviews ===
Oliver Sava of The A.V. Club gave the episode a B+, describing it as "one of the season's best". Sava noted that Amy had been "largely operating in the background for most of this season" but claimed she was "The Big Bang Theory's most valuable asset". Sava had previously suggested that an episode of the show should focus on "Amy's desire to be one of Bernadette's bridesmaids".

Robin Pierson of The TV Critic rated the episode 58 out of 100, complimenting the "solid attempt to make Amy a more sympathetic character" but wanting the writers to "show Amy learning something from this experience". Pierson also said "the episode wasn't particularly funny" but that Bernadette and Penny's "tolerance of [Amy's] blunt eagerness reflects well on them" and that "Leonard too looked good for pushing Sheldon to take care of his friend".

Jenna Busch of IGN gave the episode eight out of 10. Busch "really enjoy[ed] the dynamic between the girls". Carla Day of TV Fanatic gave the episode four out of five stars, but described Amy as "whiny and irritating". However, Day said the scene where Sheldon shouts at Howard and Leonard was "one of the funniest things I've ever seen on the show". Day noticed that "we found out that Leonard is single again", following the events of "The Good Guy Fluctuation".
