= Howard Murray =

American television director

- Occupation: Television director
- Years active: 1986–present

Howard Murray is an American television director. He is the son of the late Jan Murray, a prolific American comedian, actor, and game show host.

His credits include You Again?, The Charmings, Babes, Harry and the Hendersons, Hang Time, Smart Guy, Unhappily Ever After, Grace Under Fire, The King of Queens and The Big Bang Theory. Of the 12 seasons (280 episodes) of The Big Bang Theory, Murray served as an associate director for 86 episodes and the director of two episodes, "The Engagement Reaction" and "The Rhinitis Revelation."

Murray worked as an associate director and technical coordinator on some of the aforementioned series, as well episodes of Titus, Greetings from Tucson, It's All Relative, Two and a Half Men and Hot in Cleveland.
