= Aarti Mann =

American actress (born 1978)

- Born: March 3, 1978 (age 48); Connecticut, U.S.
- Other name: Aarti Majumdar
- Education: New York University
- Occupation: Actress
- Years active: 2006 – present
- Known for: Priya Koothrappali in The Big Bang Theory
- Spouse: Purvesh Mankad
- Children: 1

Aarti Majumdar (born March 3, 1978), better known by her stage name Aarti Mann, is an American actress. She is best known for playing the role of Priya Koothrappali in the CBS comedy series The Big Bang Theory. She stars as CIA lawyer Violet Ebner in the Netflix spy-adventure series The Recruit.

== Early life and education ==
Mann was born Aarti Majumdar in Connecticut on March 3, 1978 to Indian immigrants. "Mann" is a shortened version of her married name.

When Mann was still a toddler, she moved with her family, which consisted of her parents, her older sister Kruti and younger brother Nishad, to several places in Pennsylvania. When she was a young child she lived in Pittsburgh, Mt. Lebanon and Wexford before settling in Fox Chapel. Her mother, Vasanti Majumdar, a graduate of University of Pittsburgh Medical Center (UPMC), still lives in Fox Chapel and is a physician specializing in obstetrics and gynaecology. Mann's father, who was also a physician, died while she was in high school.

Despite Mann having never acted in plays during high school at Shady Side Academy in Fox Chapel, she graduated with a degree in film writing and directing from New York University where she practiced acting.

== Career ==
Mann began acting in the mid-2000s, initially playing minor roles. She uses both Aarti Majumdar and Aarti Mann as her professional names.

Mann's brother Nishad is a journalist and her sister Kruti helped influence her decision to switch to acting. Kruti briefly worked as a filmmaker, casting Mann in her sole producer-director effort, The Memsahib, which aired at film festivals in 2006. While filming her scenes, Mann said she "got bit by the bug" to act and enrolled in acting classes in Los Angeles.

Mann appeared in a commercial for Volvo and other roles followed, including a guest appearance of an episode of the web/TV series Quarterlife (2008), which aired. She was a guest star on a 2009 episode of Heroes, and a 2010 episode of The Young and the Restless. Mann was cast in the role of Stephanie for Paging Dr. Freed, a series being considered by USA Network; the network had Mann's character replaced during production, and later chose to not move forward with the series.

Having appeared in single episodes of various television series, Mann had her first recurring role, as Priya Koothrappali, during the 2010 and 2011 seasons of The Big Bang Theory. She continued with guest appearances in single episodes of other series until 2022, when she was part of the inaugural main cast of the Netflix spy series The Recruit, playing CIA lawyer Violet Ebner; as of February 2024, a second season is in production.

== Personal life ==
As of 2011, Mann was living in Los Angeles with her husband, Purvesh Mankad, who works in finance, and their daughter.

== Filmography ==
=== Film ===
Film roles
Year	Title	Role	Notes
2006	The Memsahib	Mirabai	Credited as Aarti Majmudar
2006	Monsoon	Radio announcer	Short film Uncredited
2007	The Punching Dummy	Judy	Short film Credited as Aarti Majmudar
2009	Ner Tamid	Laura Mann	Short film
2009	Today's Special	Henna	Credited as Aarti Majmudar
2011	Pox	Mirabai	Credited as Aarti Majmudar
2011	Worker Drone	Neela	Short film
2012	The Monogamy Experiment	Rebecca Behari	
2015	Danny Collins	Nurse Nikita	
2015	I'll See You in My Dreams	Dr. DaSilva	
2018	Love Sonia	Jiah	
2018	sharon 1.2.3.	Heather	
2023	The Donor Party	Meera	
TBA	Samskara	Priya	Post-production; Short film

=== Television ===
Television roles
Year	Title	Role	Notes
2007	The Future Dead	Stephanie / Wilhelmina / Woman Eating Dinner	3 episodes
2008	Quarterlife	Sarita	Episode: "Home Sweet Home"
2009	Heroes	Shaila	Episode: "Chapter Three 'Building 26'"
2010	The Young and the Restless	Doctor	1 episode
2010–2011	The Big Bang Theory	Priya Koothrappali	Recurring role (seasons 4–5)
2011	Futurestates	Neela	Episode: "Worker Drone"
2012	Leverage	Waitress Amy Pavali	Episode: "The Broken Wing Job"
2013	Suits	Associate Maria Monroe	Episode: "Blind-Sided"
2013	Wendell & Vinnie	Gina	Episode: "Smart Girls & Dumb Guys"
2013	Scandal	Agent Laura Kenney	Episode: "Mrs. Smith Goes to Washington"
2015	NCIS: New Orleans	Nehir	Episode: "Careful What You Wish For"
2017	Grey's Anatomy	Holly	Episode: "Leave It Inside"
2020	Never Have I Ever	Jaya Kuyavar	Episode: "...felt super Indian"
2021	All Rise	Saundra Singh	Episode: "Georgia"
2022	The Good Doctor	Naveen Mukherjee	Episode: "Sorry, Not Sorry"
2022–2025	The Recruit	Violet	Main cast
