= Alice Amter =

British actress

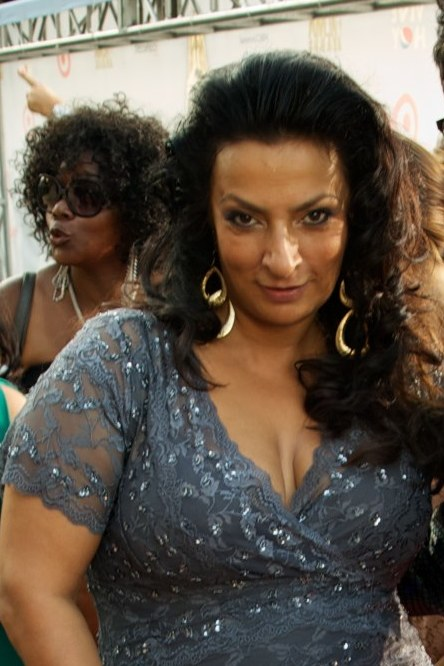
- Amter at the 2012 Alma Awards
- Born: Alice Edwards; 11 May 1966 (age 60); Birmingham, England
- Education: University of Wolverhampton (BA)
- Occupation: Actress
- Known for: Mrs. Koothrappali (The Big Bang Theory)

Alice Amter (born 11 May 1966) is an English actress, best known for her character Mrs. Koothrappali in the American sitcom The Big Bang Theory (2007–2015) and Dr. Kapoor on Hot in Cleveland (2013).

== Early life and education ==
Born Alice Edwards, she grew up in Handsworth before moving to Edgbaston, Leamington Spa and Rubery. Whilst living in Leamington Spa, she spent time in a children's home in Warwick New Road. Her single German mother later cared for her. Amter attended Milverton Junior and Infant School and she received a Bachelor of Arts in modern languages and international relations from the University of Wolverhampton.

== Career ==
She has lived in France, Germany, Japan (where she taught English in the early 1990s), and the United States. She moved to Los Angeles, California in the early 1990s. Despite her best-known role as "Mrs. Koothrappali", she has said she has no Indian ancestry.

== Filmography ==
=== Film ===
Year	Title	Role	Notes
2000	Sinbad: Beyond the Veil of Mists	Bar Wench	
2000	Mirror Mirror 4: Reflections	Countess St. Croix	
2002	The Good Girl	Big Haired Woman	
2002	Bad Boy	Donna	
2002	Pacino Is Missing	Space Chick	
2003	Hunting of Man	Hooker	
2003	A Man Apart	Marta	
2003	Exorcism	Katherine Miller	
2005	Pit Fighter	Palm Reader	
2007	American Zombie	Esperanza McNunn	
2009	Penance	Eve	
2011	Infection: The Invasion Begins	Hospital Attendant	
2013	The Book of Daniel	Itani	
2019	Smothered by Mothers	Whitney Roth	
2020	1	She - Boss	
2021	All for Her	Ani	Post-production

=== Television ===
Year	Title	Role	Notes
1998	ER	Dr. Miriam Nagarvala	2 episodes
1999	Frat Ratz	Chloe	Episode: "Real Unreal"
2000	Strong Medicine	Mey Said	Episode: "Second Opinion"
2000	The Privateers	Capt. Berava Gree	Television film
2001	Judging Amy	Philida Bosco	Episode: "8 1/2 Narrow"
2002	Cedric the Entertainer Presents	Indian Woman	Episode #1.1
2002–2003	Presidio Med	Amira	4 episodes
2007	'Til Death	Flower Lady	Episode: "The Italian Affair"
2007–2015	The Big Bang Theory	Mrs. Koothrappali	10 episodes
2008	Skip Tracer	Gypsy Woman	Television film
2009	The Cleaner	Anjali Patel	Episode: "The Projectionist"
2010	Outsourced	Fortune Teller	Episode: "Homesick to My Stomach"
2010	The Whole Truth	Turban Woman	Episode: "Uncanny"
2011	General Hospital	Evelyn	Episode #1.12351
2013	The Mentalist	Marta	Episode: "Red John's Rules"
2013	Hot in Cleveland	Dr. Kapoor	Episode: "Cleveland Indians"
2015	Chasing Life	Aditi	Episode: "The Big Leagues"
2016	Rosewood	Chitra Singh	Episode: "Paralytics and Priorities"
2016	NCIS: Los Angeles	Professor Lelah Moradi	Episode: "Parallel Resistors"
2017	Scandal	Doctor	Episode: "Dead in the Water"
2019	Sorry for Your Loss	Tula	Episode: "Thirty Years"
2020	Never Have I Ever	Auntie Sunu	Episode: "...felt super Indian"
2021	Mythic Quest	Magda	Episode: "Peter"
