= Mark Cendrowski =

American television director

- Born: August 5, 1959 (age 67)
- Education: University of Michigan
- Occupations: Film and Television director producer and screenwriter
- Years active: 1989–present
- Known for: Director of The Big Bang Theory episodes

Mark Cendrowski (born August 5, 1959) is an American film and television director. He is best known as the director of most episodes of The Big Bang Theory.

Cendrowski is a 1981 graduate of the University of Michigan and a 1977 graduate of Notre Dame High School in Harper Woods, Michigan.

He has worked on a number of series, including directing many episodes of Yes, Dear, Still Standing, According to Jim, Rules of Engagement, and was the primary director of The Big Bang Theory. He has also directed episodes of Wizards of Waverly Place, The King of Queens, A.N.T. Farm, Hannah Montana, Sabrina, the Teenage Witch, The Hughleys, Malcolm & Eddie, Men at Work, Sullivan & Son, Dads, The Carmichael Show and Superior Donuts, among others.

Cendrowski received his first-ever Emmy nomination for Outstanding Directing for a Comedy Series for the final episode of the eleventh season of The Big Bang Theory, "The Bow Tie Asymmetry", which included special guest star Mark Hamill and another nomination for the series finale "The Stockholm Syndrome".

Cendrowski began his TV career as an assistant director and stage manager.

== Filmography ==
Year	Title	Episodes	Note
2024-	Georgie and Mandy's First Marriage	TBD	
2023	Night Court	1	
2021	Call Me Kat	1	
2021-2022	United States of Al	19	
2020	United We Fall	6	
2018	Happy Together	2	
2018–2024	The Neighborhood	39	
2017–2018	Superior Donuts	3	
2017–2019	Young Sheldon	5	
2016–2019	Fuller House	6	
2015–2017	Dr. Ken	4	
2015–2017	The Odd Couple	10	
2016	Family Fortune		TV movie
2015	The Carmichael Show	1	
2015	Fantasy Life		
2014	Living the Dream		
2013–2014	Dads	6	
2013	Guys with Kids	1	
2013	Malibu Country	1	
2013	Super Fun Night	1	
2012–2013	Sullivan & Son	2	
2012	Men at Work	7	
2012	Rob	1	
2011	Billion Dollar Freshmen		
2011	Whitney	1	
2011	A.N.T. Farm	1	
2011	Bucket and Skinner's Epic Adventures	1	
2011	Mad Love	1	
2010	Who Gets the Parents		
2009–2010	The Suite Life on Deck	2	
2009	Rita Rocks	2	
2008	Cory in the House	1	
2007–2019	The Big Bang Theory	244	
2007–2012	Rules of Engagement	6	
2007–2009	Wizards of Waverly Place	8	
2007	Hannah Montana	2	
2007	The Winner	5	
2006	Happy Hour	3	
2006	Courting Alex	6	
2005–2006	Out of Practice	4	
2005	Committed	1	
2005	Untitled Susie Essman Project		
2004–2006	Still Standing	12	
2004–2005	Center of the Universe	6	
2000–2005	Yes, Dear	44	
2004	The Men's Room	Unknown	
2004	Listen Up	1	
2004	George Lopez	1	
2003–2004	Married to the Kellys	5	
2003	Lost at Home	1	
2003	8 Simple Rules for Dating My Teenage Daughter	2	
2003	Abby	1	
2002–2005	According to Jim	24	
2002	Greetings from Tucson	1	
2002	What I Like About You	1	
2002	One on One	1	
2002	Three Sisters	1	
2001–2002	Off Centre	4	
2001	So Little Time	4	
2000	Daddio	2	
2000	Then Came You	1	
1999–2005	The King of Queens	3	
1999–2002	The Hughleys	22	
1998–2003	Sabrina, the Teenage Witch	3	
1999–2000	The Jamie Foxx Show	4	
1999–2000	Ladies Man	5	
1999	Los Beltrán	2	
1999	Oh, Grow Up	1	
1998–1999	Smart Guy	4	
1998	Two Guys, a Girl and a Pizza Place	1	
1997–1998	Teen Angel	8	
1997	Brotherly Love	2	
1996–1998	Brotherly Love	Malcolm & Eddie	15
1996–1997	17	Malcolm & Eddie	assistant director
1995	2	assistant director	
1994–1995	All-American Girl	9	assistant director
1994	Wings	2	assistant director
1993	The Mommies	1	stage manager
1992	Woops!	1	stage manager
1992	Nurses	1	stage manager
1991	Roseanne	1	stage manager
1990	Good Grief	2	stage manager
1989–1990	Full House	19	stage manager
1986	What's Happening Now!!	1	stage manager
