= The Big Bang Theory season 1 =

The Big Bang Theory
- Season 1
- DVD cover art
- Showrunner: Bill Prady
- Starring: Johnny Galecki; Jim Parsons; Kaley Cuoco; Simon Helberg; Kunal Nayyar
- No. of episodes: 17

Release
- Original network: CBS
- Original release: September 24, 2007 – May 19, 2008

Season chronology
- Next → Season 2

The first season of the American television sitcom The Big Bang Theory aired on CBS from September 24, 2007 to May 19, 2008.

The Season One DVD came without a gag reel and is the only The Big Bang Theory DVD set not to have one. The reissued Blu-ray, which was released on July 10, 2012, includes a gag reel that is exclusive to the set. The episodes on Blu-ray are all in remastered surround sound, whereas the DVD version had stereo. Two of the main characters, Sheldon and Leonard, are named after actor, director, and producer Sheldon Leonard.

Although this season received mixed reviews from critics, Johnny Galecki and Sara Gilbert both selected the episode "The Hamburger Postulate" as a Primetime Emmy Award submission for Outstanding Lead Actor in a Comedy Series and Outstanding Guest Actress in a Comedy Series, respectively, at the 60th Primetime Emmy Awards, but both ended up not receiving a nomination. Jim Parsons selected the episode "The Pancake Batter Anomaly" as a Primetime Emmy Award submission for Outstanding Lead Actor in a Comedy Series at the 60th Primetime Emmy Awards, but he ended up not receiving a nomination.

== Production ==
The series' initial pilot, which was developed for the 2006–07 television season, was substantially different from its current form. From the later series, only Johnny Galecki and Jim Parsons were in the cast, and their across-the-hall neighbor Katie was envisioned as "a street-hardened, tough-as-nails woman with a vulnerable interior". Katie was played by actress Amanda Walsh. They also had a female friend called Gilda, who was played by Iris Bahr. The series' original theme music was also different, using Thomas Dolby's hit "She Blinded Me with Science". The series was not picked up, but the creators were given an opportunity to revise it, bringing in the remaining leading cast and retooling the show to its current format. The original unaired pilot has never been released on any official format, but copies of it have circulated online.

The second pilot of The Big Bang Theory was directed by James Burrows, who did not continue with the show. This reworked pilot led to a 13-episode order by CBS on May 14, 2007. Prior to its airing on CBS, the pilot episode was distributed free of charge on iTunes. The series premiered on September 24, 2007, and was picked up for a full 22-episode season on October 19, 2007.

Production on the series was halted on November 6, 2007 due to the 2007–08 Writers Guild of America strike. The Big Bang Theory was replaced by a short-lived sitcom, Welcome to The Captain on February 4, 2008. The series ended up returning on March 17, 2008 in an earlier time slot.

David Saltzberg, a professor of physics and astronomy at the University of California, Los Angeles, checks scripts and provides dialogue, math equations and diagrams used as props.

Clips from the finale of the first season, "The Tangerine Factor", gained popularity on the Chinese video-sharing website Tudou because of Sheldon's comically inaccurate Mandarin.

== Cast ==
=== Main cast ===
- Johnny Galecki as Dr. Leonard Hofstadter
- Jim Parsons as Dr. Sheldon Cooper
- Kaley Cuoco as Penny
- Simon Helberg as Howard Wolowitz
- Kunal Nayyar as Dr. Rajesh "Raj" Koothrappali

=== Recurring cast ===
- Brian Patrick Wade as Kurt
- Vernee Watson as Althea
- Sara Gilbert as Leslie Winkle
- Laurie Metcalf as Mary Cooper
- Mark Harelik as Dr. Eric Gablehauser
- Carol Ann Susi as Mrs. Wolowitz
- Brian George as Dr. V.M. Koothrappali
- Alice Amter as Mrs. Koothrappali

=== Guest cast ===
- Brooke D'Orsay as Christy
- James Hong as Chen
- Sarayu Rao as Lalita Gupta
- DJ Qualls as Toby Loobenfeld
- Austin Lee as Dennis Kim
- Andrew Walker as Mike
- Courtney Henggeler as Missy Cooper

== Episodes ==
No. overall	No. in season	Title	Directed by	Written by	Original release date	Prod. code	U.S. viewers (millions)
1	1	"Pilot"	James Burrows	Chuck Lorre & Bill Prady	September 24, 2007	276023	9.52
After an unsuccessful visit to the high-IQ sperm bank, Dr. Leonard Hofstadter and Dr. Sheldon Cooper return home to find aspiring actress Penny is their new neighbor across the hall from their apartment. Sheldon thinks Leonard, who is immediately interested in her, is chasing a dream he will never catch. Leonard invites Penny to his and Sheldon's apartment for Indian food, where she asks to use their shower since hers is broken. While wrapped in a towel, she gets to meet their visiting friends Howard Wolowitz, a wannabe ladies' man who tries to hit on her, and Rajesh Koothrappali, who is unable to speak to her as he suffers from selective mutism in the presence of women. Leonard is so infatuated with Penny that, after helping her use their shower, he agrees to retrieve her TV from her ex-boyfriend Kurt. However, Kurt's physical superiority overwhelms Leonard and Sheldon, and they return without pants or Penny's TV. Penny, feeling bad, offers to take the guys out to dinner, initiating a friendship with them.
2	2	"The Big Bran Hypothesis"	Mark Cendrowski	Story by : Chuck Lorre & Bill Prady; Teleplay by : Robert Cohen & Dave Goetsch	October 1, 2007	3T6601	8.50
When Sheldon and Leonard drop off a box of flat pack furniture that came for Penny, Sheldon is deeply disturbed at how messy and disorganized her apartment is. Later that night, while Penny sleeps, the obsessive-compulsive Sheldon, unable to sleep, sneaks into her apartment to organize and clean it. Leonard finds out and reluctantly helps him. The next morning, Penny is furious to discover they had been in her apartment. Sheldon tries to apologize to Penny but fails by remarking that Leonard is a "gentle and thorough lover". Later, Penny encounters Raj in the hallway. Though he cannot talk to Penny, she calms down whilst telling him about the issue, reasoning the guys were just trying to help her, and hugs Raj. Then Leonard apologizes, prompting Penny to forgive and hug him. In the end, the guys help Penny set up her furniture only to begin seriously overthinking the best way to get started while Penny ends up putting everything together herself, although she does admit that her apartment looks better than it was before.
3	3	"The Fuzzy Boots Corollary"	Mark Cendrowski	Story by : Chuck Lorre; Teleplay by : Bill Prady & Steven Molaro	October 8, 2007	3T6602	8.35
When a dejected Leonard sees Penny kissing a man in front of her apartment door, the guys persuade him to date someone at work, so he approaches fellow scientist Leslie Winkle. In an experiment to strip the usual dating procedure to its essentials, she suggests fast forwarding to a kiss. She finds their kiss good but unexciting, so she turns him down. As Leonard becomes more depressed, thinking of buying a cat, Sheldon points out that Penny never rejected him as he never asked her out, so Leonard asks her out to dinner. As she misinterprets this as an invitation to hang out with all the guys, he devises reasons for their absence from the date. Penny says the man Leonard saw was not her boyfriend: casual weekend sex helps her get over relationships. Leonard, excited, regains his confidence, but he accidentally hurts himself and Penny has to take him home. In the end, Leonard does not find the courage to reveal his true feelings to Penny, though she suspected what he was up to.
4	4	"The Luminous Fish Effect"	Mark Cendrowski	Story by : Chuck Lorre & Bill Prady; Teleplay by : David Litt & Lee Aronsohn	October 15, 2007	3T6603	7.94
Sheldon is fired from his job as a physicist at a university after insulting his new boss Dr. Eric Gablehauser. Sheldon's change of circumstance triggers a downward spiral of depression in which he fails to improve scrambled eggs, develops luminous fish for nightlights, and weaves on a hand loom. Worried, Leonard calls Sheldon's mother, Mary Cooper. When she visits, the men realize she is the complete opposite of their expectations: she is sweet, down-to-earth, a devout Christian, and a loving and caring mother. Mary finally forces Sheldon to apologize; he is given his job back after she flirts with Dr. Gablehauser.
5	5	"The Hamburger Postulate"	Andrew D. Weyman	Story by : Jennifer Glickman & Hart Hanson; Teleplay by : Dave Goetsch & Steven Molaro	October 22, 2007	3T6604	8.81
The guys, eating at the Cheesecake Factory where Penny works, are approached by Leslie Winkle. She wants Leonard to play cello in her string quartet as the other players are uncomfortable near the current cellist who was possibly irradiated at work. After the quartet practice in Leonard and Sheldon's apartment, Leslie seduces Leonard for the night, making Sheldon so uneasy that he repeatedly asks Penny's advice. Penny later congratulates Leonard, who tries to figure out what she meant. Leonard decides to pursue a real relationship with Leslie rather than an imaginary one with Penny, but at her lab, Leslie makes it clear she is not interested in a relationship: she just needed him for a one-night stand to satisfy her sex drive - which is now satisfied until New Year. Leonard later tells Penny, who reassures him and walks away smiling.
6	6	"The Middle-earth Paradigm"	Mark Cendrowski	Story by : Dave Goetsch; Teleplay by : David Litt & Robert Cohen	October 29, 2007	3T6605	8.41
Penny invites the guys to her Halloween party. They at first decline as they do not dance, but accept when costumes are mentioned. At the party they have problems socializing: Sheldon is unable to explain his Doppler effect costume since none of Penny's friends are physicists or smart enough to understand it; Raj (dressed as Thor) cannot speak to women; Howard as Robin Hood is mistaken for Peter Pan; and Leonard (dressed as Frodo Baggins from The Lord of the Rings) is insecure. Penny's ex-boyfriend Kurt (underdressed as a very tall, muscular caveman) later shows up and aggressively confronts Leonard, causing him to leave. A drunk Penny goes to check on Leonard and apologizes for Kurt's behavior, confessing that Kurt played on her emotions to come to her party. She is very upset, but Leonard tells her she is perfect, and they kiss, but Leonard stops it from going any further, not wanting to take advantage of her drunken and emotional state. They kiss again, in sight of Kurt, Leonard saying "That's how we roll at the Shire!" before locking his apartment door in panic. Meanwhile, Howard cannot find Raj, who is at home sleeping with a girl who finds him to be a "such a good listener".
7	7	"The Dumpling Paradox"	Mark Cendrowski	Story by : Chuck Lorre & Bill Prady; Teleplay by : Lee Aronsohn & Jennifer Glickman	November 5, 2007	3T6606	9.37
Penny's promiscuous acquaintance Christy from Omaha, Nebraska, "kind of family" since she slept with Penny's brother while engaged to her cousin, arrives to visit Penny indefinitely, and immediately beds Howard in Penny's apartment which the pair take over. Penny replaces Howard as a Halo 3 player and displays natural talent, to Sheldon's disbelief. To avoid the noisy "lovers", Penny sleeps on Leonard and Sheldon's couch that night. Next day, Howard invites Christy to move in with him (and his mother), taking up all his time. Distraught at the odd number in the group, Sheldon invites Penny to play Halo again, but she prefers to go dancing. The guys believe their group is falling apart and go to speak to Howard. There they hear Howard's mother arguing loudly with Christy, causing her to leave. Howard, single again, goes to play Halo with the guys, and the group is restored, completely ignoring Penny and her three attractive friends who briefly appear at the door.
8	8	"The Grasshopper Experiment"	Ted Wass	Story by : Dave Goetsch & Steven Molaro; Teleplay by : Lee Aronsohn & Robert Cohen	November 12, 2007	3T6607	9.32
Raj introduces his parents, Dr. V.M. Koothrappali and Mrs. Koothrappali, to his friends via webcam. However, Raj is overwhelmed when his parents try to arrange him a date with Lalita Gupta, a childhood friend and dental student, as he cannot talk to women. To Raj's annoyance, Howard, using a fake Indian accent (notably inspired by Apu Nahasapeemapetilon from The Simpsons) to impersonate Raj, phones Lalita to set up a date for them. Meanwhile, Penny takes up bar tending for some extra money. She practices mixing drinks with the guys, and they discover Raj is able to speak to women after drinking alcohol. They decide his date should be at Penny's restaurant so she and the guys can keep an eye on Raj's behavior when drinking. On his date, Raj becomes an obnoxious drunk, angering Lalita, who has no intentions of marrying Raj and had only agreed to the date to placate her parents. After Sheldon flatters Lalita with compliments comparing her to Princess Panchali, an Indian fairy tale princess from a folktale he and Howard refer to as The Monkey and the Princess, she takes him away for a meal, to Raj's horror. When Raj tries to explain all this to his parents, they are angry about his drinking after being exposed by Sheldon, who later admits to Leonard that he wasn't interested in Lalita anyway but had a good time with her.
9	9	"The Cooper-Hofstadter Polarization"	Joel Murray	Story by : Bill Prady & Stephen Engel; Teleplay by : Chuck Lorre & Lee Aronsohn & Dave Goetsch	March 17, 2008	3T6608	8.93
Leonard cleans up after an Internet experiment, and in the trash can he finds an invitation to him and Sheldon to present their joint research at an academic conference. Sheldon disapproves of presenting research in person, but Leonard defies him and goes alone. This causes a rift between the two which Penny tries to mend but accidentally makes worse. Sheldon appears at the conference and tries to discredit Leonard's presentation by attempting to "blow up" Leonard's head with his mind à la the movie Scanners, starting a physical altercation between the two. Howard films the fight on his cellphone and puts it on YouTube, but angers Penny by also posting a photo on Facebook of her sleeping on his shoulder during the presentation, captioned "Me and my girlfriend".
10	10	"The Loobenfeld Decay"	Mark Cendrowski	Story by : Chuck Lorre & Bill Prady; Teleplay by : Bill Prady & Lee Aronsohn	March 24, 2008	3T6609	8.53
Penny is given a part in the musical Rent, but after Leonard and Sheldon hear her off-key singing, Leonard lies to avoid having to see her perform and hurt her feelings. Sheldon, worried that Leonard's lie was inadequate, devises an intricate lie about his nonexistent drug-addicted cousin "Leopold "Leo" Houston" needing an intervention the night of the play. Sheldon is so obsessed with his lie's credibility that he has Toby Loobenfeld, a research assistant who double majored in Physics and Theatre, impersonate cousin "Leo" to convince Penny the lie is true. In the end, Leonard must still see the video of Penny's performance, and Penny and "Leo" start flirting.
11	11	"The Pancake Batter Anomaly"	Mark Cendrowski	Story by : Chuck Lorre & Lee Aronsohn; Teleplay by : Bill Prady & Stephen Engel	March 31, 2008	3T6610	8.44
Penny returns from visiting family in Nebraska, but mentions while picking up mail from Leonard that most of her relatives became sick. Sheldon, a germophobe according to Leonard, freaks out and becomes sick, becoming demanding on top of his already obnoxious personality. Familiar with Sheldon being sick, Leonard and the guys hide from him at a Planet of the Apes series marathon, leaving Penny to care for Sheldon. However, Leonard breaks his glasses in the cinema and has to retrieve his spare pair from the apartment, piloted by Howard and Raj using a laptop, an endoscope, and a Bluetooth helmet camera worn by the near-sighted Leonard. Penny intercepts him and, realizing that he lied about being stuck at work, abandons him to his fate with Sheldon while Raj and Howard hastily pack up and run away. Leonard tries to escape, but runs into a wall and nearly knocks himself out. In the end, injured Leonard and sick Sheldon sit miserably on the couch.
12	12	"The Jerusalem Duality"	Mark Cendrowski	Story by : Jennifer Glickman & Stephen Engel; Teleplay by : Dave Goetsch & Steven Molaro	April 14, 2008	3T6611	7.63
Sheldon becomes envious when he meets 15-year-old child prodigy Dennis Kim, who was accepted for doctoral studies at the university, and soon realizes that not only is Kim similar to himself, but is seemingly better than him at everything (including being annoying). Sheldon loses faith in his own research and annoys his friends by criticizing their work more than ever and forcing his own contributions on them. Finding his physics work useless, he aims for the Nobel Peace Prize by attempting to solve all Middle East conflicts, but he annoys everyone, including a Jewish professor, with his proposal that an exact replica of Jerusalem be built in the Mexican desert. The others, tired of Sheldon's behavior, decide to distract Kim with girls of the same age. Their plan unexpectedly works at Kim's welcome party, and Kim leaves with a blonde 15-year-old. Sheldon resumes his research while the others are perplexed at how easily Kim was able to get a girl. At the end, the group happens upon Kim drinking alcohol with a bunch of street kids, but while the others feel somewhat guilty for ruining his life at such a young age, Sheldon just casually says "he was weak" and continues walking.
13	13	"The Bat Jar Conjecture"	Mark Cendrowski	Story by : Stephen Engel & Jennifer Glickman; Teleplay by : Bill Prady & Robert Cohen	April 21, 2008	3T6612	7.39
The guys decide to compete in a university physics bowl after the strong competitors drop out, but Sheldon's showboating is too much, and they eject him from the team. Sheldon, upset, vows to form his own team and compete against them. The guys, in need of a fourth member, ask Leslie Winkle. She at first declines, but accepts on hearing they are opposing Sheldon, who has often criticized her research and gender. The guys name themselves PMS (Perpetual Motion Squad, an unintentional pun on premenstrual syndrome). Sheldon's team is named AA (Army Ants, an unintentional pun on Alcoholics Anonymous), and comprises Sheldon (who forbids answers from his teammates), the 3rd floor janitor, the lunch lady, and her son (or possibly her butcher). PMS win when Sheldon, unable to answer the last question, refuses to accept the janitor's answer, which is actually correct: he explains that despite working as a janitor in America, he was a physicist in the former Soviet Union.
14	14	"The Nerdvana Annihilation"	Mark Cendrowski	Story by : Bill Prady; Teleplay by : Stephen Engel & Steven Molaro	April 28, 2008	3T6613	8.07
In an online auction, Leonard buys a full-sized replica of the time machine from the 1960 film The Time Machine, believing it to be a miniature. The men's efforts to move the cumbersome object into the apartment cause Penny to lose a work shift, and she lashes out at them for their obsession with childish memorabilia. This upsets Leonard, who decides to sell all his collectibles. His friends try to dissuade him, but they also want his collectibles and argue over who should get what. Sheldon later accuses Penny of hypocrisy, pointing out her own love of such things as Hello Kitty or Care Bears. Penny apologizes to Leonard and dissuades him from abandoning the things he loves. His hope of a relationship with her is thus very briefly renewed until her current boyfriend Mike appears and pulls her into her apartment. Sheldon later has nightmares of being attacked by Morlocks, and persuades Leonard to return the time machine replica.
15	15	"The Pork Chop Indeterminacy"	Mark Cendrowski	Story by : Chuck Lorre; Teleplay by : Lee Aronsohn & Bill Prady	May 5, 2008	3T6614	7.38
Sheldon's twin sister Missy visits him for his signature on some forms related to their deceased father's estate. He introduces her to the guys and all are attracted to her. Raj decides to take part in a drug trial to cure his inability to talk to women, and Leonard insists Missy stay with them at the apartment. Predictably, the men all awkwardly flirt with her, so Penny comes to her rescue. Leonard, hoping for an advantage over Howard and Raj, convinces Sheldon he is Missy's guardian as concerns her choice of partner. Sheldon deems all three guys to be unsuitable for her. On learning of Sheldon's plan to find her a suitable mate, Missy confronts her brother, and after she kicks him in the groin he agrees she can date whoever she likes. She turns down Leonard, and then Howard, who fails to charm her with simple conjuring tricks. Finally Raj goes to talk to Missy, who shows interest in him, but the drug wears off and he is unable to speak to her, forcing Raj to leave defeated.
16	16	"The Peanut Reaction"	Mark Cendrowski	Story by : Bill Prady & Lee Aronsohn; Teleplay by : Dave Goetsch & Steven Molaro	May 12, 2008	3T6615	7.79
Penny learns that Leonard has never had a birthday party, as his parents did not believe in celebrating anything other than achievements. She decides to throw him a surprise party, and blackmails Sheldon to join in by threatening to draw a smiley face on each of his mint condition comic books. However, on the day of the party, Penny discovers Sheldon has not yet bought a present, so she has to drive him to a computer store to buy one. Meanwhile, Howard has the task of keeping Leonard out of his apartment before the party. Howard pretends to eat a peanut bar, to which he is allergic, so that Leonard will drive him to the emergency room. However, Sheldon's lack of focus at the computer store means Howard has to distract Leonard even longer, and he eventually actually eats the peanut bar, swelling up in a severe allergic reaction. After several hours at the hospital, Howard and Leonard arrive back at the apartment to find the party has ended, though Penny does kiss Leonard.
17	17	"The Tangerine Factor"	Mark Cendrowski	Story by : Chuck Lorre & Bill Prady; Teleplay by : Lee Aronsohn & Steven Molaro	May 19, 2008	3T6616	7.34
Sheldon, determined to prove that the Chinese restaurant uses oranges instead of tangerines in their "Tangerine chicken", asks Howard to teach him Mandarin. Meanwhile, Penny furiously breaks up with Mike after he posts details of their sex life on his blog. When Penny laments her choice of men, Leonard awkwardly asks her out. After a few days, both worry that this relationship could ruin their friendship; and each seeks advice from Sheldon, who uses the "Schrödinger's cat" thought experiment to explain that the date has both "good" and "bad" possible outcomes, and the only way to determine which outcome is to go on the date. When Leonard arrives to pick up Penny, he mentions the thought experiment and kisses her passionately. She concludes that "the cat is alive" and they leave for dinner. They go to the Chinese restaurant, but not before seeing Sheldon arguing with the owner in very bad Mandarin, disturbing the patrons.

== Reception ==
The Big Bang Theory initially received mixed reviews, receiving a 59% "rotten" score on review aggregator site Rotten Tomatoes based on 29 reviews, with an average rating of 5.5/10 and with the site's critics consensus reading: "The Big Bang Theory brings a new class of character to mainstream television, but much of the comedy feels formulaic and stiff." It also received a 57-point score on review aggregator Metacritic, indicating "mixed or average" reviews, based on 23 reviews.

Tom Shales of The Washington Post gave the show a positive review, saying "Big Bang is the funniest new sitcom of the season". Robert Bianco of USA Today also gave the show a positive review, saying "This may not be the sitcom breakthrough for which we've all been hoping, but Lorre has produced a first episode that leaves you eager to try the second".

David Bianculli of New York Daily News criticized the dialogue, particularly when the male characters explain jokes, writing that "People tuning in to Big Bang may not all be Mensa members, but they won't all be idiots, either", Henry Goldblatt of Entertainment Weekly criticized the premise and plot of early episodes, writing that "To call this a one-joke sitcom would be a stretch", and Tim Goodman of San Francisco Chronicle criticized the stereotypes presented in the characters, and wrote that "the writing here is so moronic and the situations so forced and mundane".
