= Pilot (The Big Bang Theory) =

Pilot episode of The Big Bang Theory

- The Big Bang Theory episode
- Episode no.: Season 1 Episode 1
- Directed by: James Burrows
- Written by: Chuck Lorre; Bill Prady
- Cinematography by: Steven V. Silver
- Editing by: Peter Chakos
- Production code: 276023
- Original air date: September 24, 2007

Guest appearances
- Vernée Watson as Althea; Brian Patrick Wade as Kurt

Episode chronology
← Previous —	Next → "The Big Bran Hypothesis"
- The Big Bang Theory season 1

"Pilot" is the pilot episode, as well as the first episode of the first season, of the American television sitcom The Big Bang Theory. The episode originally aired on CBS in the United States on September 24, 2007. It was written by the show's creators, Chuck Lorre and Bill Prady, and directed by James Burrows. The pilot episode introduces the main characters in the series, and also guest stars Vernée Watson and Brian Patrick Wade as Althea and Kurt, respectively.

The pilot episode received mixed reviews from television critics, with praise for the premise, character development and performances, but criticism for the tone and rushed start of the season. According to Nielsen Ratings, the episode was viewed by 9.52 million viewers on its original airing.

== Plot ==
Leonard Hofstadter and Sheldon Cooper are two intelligent young physicists who have a combined IQ of 360 and claim to have "beautiful minds" that understand how the universe works at the beginning of the series. However, they are also both socially awkward, especially around women. After fleeing a visit to a sperm bank for high-IQ donors, they return home and meet Penny, an aspiring actress who has moved into the apartment adjacent to the one they share. Leonard is instantly infatuated and hopes to have a romantic and/or sexual relationship with Penny, which Sheldon considers unlikely to happen. Leonard at least attempts to form a friendship with her and awkwardly invites her into their apartment for lunch.

Sheldon is quite content spending his nights playing Klingon-language Boggle with their socially dysfunctional friends, fellow geeks Howard Wolowitz, a wannabe ladies' man, and Rajesh Koothrappali, who has selective mutism in front of women. However, Leonard is so infatuated with Penny that, after letting her use their shower because hers is broken, he agrees to try to retrieve her TV from her macho ex-boyfriend, Kurt. However, Kurt de-pants Leonard and Sheldon, and they are unable to retrieve the TV. Feeling bad, Penny offers to buy the guys dinner; Sheldon realizes that Leonard will continue pursuing her.

== Unaired pilot ==
An earlier pilot was produced that did not include Penny, Howard, or Raj. It instead included the characters Katie (Amanda Walsh) and Gilda (Iris Bahr). Katie, like Penny, is a street-smart foil to book-smart Leonard and Sheldon; however, she is meaner than Penny. She claimed to have slept with her stepfather before her mother married him. Moreover, in the original pilot, the character of Sheldon is more sexual and libidinous. Sheldon is stated to have had sex with Gilda, his and Leonard's friend, at a Star Trek convention. CBS passed on the original pilot, but liked the show enough to ask Lorre and Prady to produce a second one.

== Reception ==
The episode received mixed reviews upon its debut. Jim Chamberlin of IGN praised the episode, calling it "a great start for the series", and stating that the writing was "some of the best we've seen in a standard sitcom in some time". Matthew Gilbert of The Boston Globe, however, gave a negative review, saying that the show is "one of those laugh-track sitcoms that has exactly one comedy routine and just keeps hammering it home". Scott Tobias of The A.V. Club was very negative about the episode, giving it a D+ rating:

Really bad television shows tend to pander to the mean: In affirming the superiority of Joe and Jane Average, they mock both the egregiously stupid ... and the hyper-intelligent, who are struck down for the arrogant, unpardonable sin of… um… knowing stuff. The new CBS sitcom The Big Bang Theory is a broad example of this principle—really broad, like Amazon basin broad. It’s hard to believe that anyone’s even making a three-camera sitcom this mothballed; only an offhand mention of the word “blog” suggests that it takes place in the present-day.
