= Leonard Hofstadter =

Fictional character in The Big Bang Theory

- The Big Bang Theory character
- Johnny Galecki as Leonard Hofstadter
- First appearance: "Pilot"; The Big Bang Theory; September 24, 2007
- Last appearance: "A Swedish Science Thing and the Equation for Toast"; Young Sheldon; May 16, 2019
- Created by: Chuck Lorre Bill Prady
- Portrayed by: Johnny Galecki Isaac Harger (Young Sheldon)

In-universe information
- Full name: Dr. Leonard Leakey Hofstadter
- Gender: Male
- Title: Doctor
- Occupation: Experimental physicist
- Family: Beverly Hofstadter (mother); Alfred Hofstadter (father); Michael Hofstadter (brother); One or more niece and/or nephews via Michael; Unnamed sister; Nephews via sister: Neil; Jeffrey; Scott; William; Richard; Floyd (uncle); Nancy (aunt); Unnamed Child
- Spouse: Penny (m. 2015)
- Relatives: Wyatt (father-in-law) Susan (mother-in-law) Randall (brother-in-law) Lisa (sister-in-law)
- Nationality: American

Leonard Leakey Hofstadter, Ph.D. is a fictional character portrayed by Johnny Galecki and one of the protagonists in the 2007–2019 CBS sitcom, The Big Bang Theory. Leonard is an experimental physicist who shares an apartment with his colleague and best friend, Sheldon Cooper. For his portrayal, Galecki was nominated for a Primetime Emmy Award and a Golden Globe Award in 2011.

Penny is Leonard's next-door neighbor (across the hall) and main love interest, and the teasing of romance between the two of them is a major force driving the series. In season 7, "The Gorilla Dissolution", they get engaged and later married in Las Vegas.

== Creation and casting ==
Leonard is named after actor/producer Sheldon Leonard and Nobel Prize in Physics Laureate Robert Hofstadter. The part was originally offered to Macaulay Culkin but he turned it down as he did not like the pitch. John Ross Bowie, who would later be cast as Barry Kripke, also auditioned for the role. Johnny Galecki was originally asked to play the role of Sheldon Cooper but thought he would be "better suited" for the character of Leonard. Leonard is one of four characters to appear in every episode of the series, along with Sheldon Cooper, Howard Wolowitz, and Rajesh Koothrappali.

== Characterization ==
=== Personality ===
Originally from New Jersey and a graduate of Princeton University, Leonard works as a Caltech experimental physicist, mainly working with lasers, and shares an apartment with colleague Sheldon Cooper in Pasadena, California. He is usually seen wearing his characteristic black thick-framed glasses and low-cut black Converse All Stars sneakers with pastel hoodies or neutral-colored sweat jackets (i.e. jackets with integrated hoodies) or a combination of the two, brown or red trousers, or (less frequently) jeans and physics-themed T-shirts. At night Leonard wears a white t-shirt, a maroon robe and white socks. His various girlfriends try to change his outfits: Penny has no success, while Stephanie gets him to wear dress shirts and sweaters (which he finds uncomfortable), and Priya gets him to switch briefly to dress shirts, waistcoats and dark slacks; he reverts to his original outfits after she leaves for India, but starts eschewing his hoodies in favor of button-down shirts and non-hooded jackets towards the end of the seventh season, a trend that continues into successive seasons; in the series finale, Leonard admits that the only reason he wears hoodies is because of how low Sheldon insists on setting the thermostat, although by this point Sheldon has not lived with him for the past three years.

Although Leonard feels at home with his geek colleagues, he wants to be more social; of the four main male characters, he has the least difficulty interacting with "non-geek" individuals. He is instantly captivated by Penny, and from the beginning sets out to date her. In early episodes, Leonard is reluctant to let Penny know about his recreational activities (such as Klingon Boggle), as he does not want her to see him as a geek. While certainly a geek by most definitions, he is far less socially inept than Sheldon (who is unable to grasp social norms and is often even dismissive of them), Raj (who is initially unable to talk to women unless he is under the influence of alcohol or anti-anxiety prescription drugs, and even after getting over his handicap still tends to speak inappropriately), and Howard (who is often seen as "creepy" when flirting with women, including Penny).

Leonard is also musically inclined, playing the cello. He claims that his parents made him take cello lessons when he was young. In season 1 episode "The Hamburger Postulate", he and Leslie Winkle have sex, after meeting to practice their instruments, which Leonard calls "a little musical foreplay".

Despite his attempts not to appear to be a geek, Leonard owns Star Wars hygiene products, a prop of the One Ring, Star Trek and Star Trek: The Next Generation officers' uniforms, an expansive Superman comic book collection and a Battlestar Galactica Colonial warrior's flight suit. Early in the series, Leonard tries to get rid of his collectables to impress Penny with his maturity. However, he changes his mind when he sees that Penny is already dating another man.

Because he has lived with Sheldon for several years, Leonard knows him better than his other colleagues: this has led Sheldon to believe that Leonard is his best friend. Nevertheless, Leonard often finds himself explaining Sheldon's behavior or serving as a mediator between him and other people. For instance, when Penny and Sheldon engage in a fierce dispute, Leonard gives her Sheldon's mother's phone number so she will call her son and scold him for his behavior, thus ending the fight. "The Staircase Implementation" features a flashback to when Leonard first moved in with Sheldon. Leonard explains to Penny that he moved in despite the difficulty of living with Sheldon because the rent was so reasonable. Shortly after moving in, during a rocketry experiment that Leonard, Raj and Howard conducted, Sheldon observed miscalculations Leonard made in mixing the rocket fuel and subsequently saved Leonard's life by pulling him out of the building's elevator just before the fuel capsule exploded. This explains why the elevator is out of order for the duration of the series. Leonard says that Sheldon, despite his tendency to alienate others, kept quiet about Leonard's destruction of the elevator – "He didn't rat me out to the landlord, or the police.... or Homeland Security."

Despite Leonard's reasonable and friendly personality, he occasionally demonstrates a mean streak. This includes deliberately triggering Sheldon's obsessive compulsive problems, mocking Howard and Raj whenever they slip up, and making sniping comments when Penny's commitment issues flare up. He is also prone to jealousy, often feeling insecure and defensive whenever Penny interacts with other men, and on one occasion trying to frighten off a British college student she is doing a project with, because Penny comments positively on his accent. This incident ironically leads to Penny finally, if inadvertently, declaring her love for Leonard.

Leonard's primary health concern is his lactose intolerance – consuming dairy products results in flatulence. Leonard wears eyeglasses because of myopia and cannot see clearly without them. In one episode, when his glasses are broken at the movie theater, he has to surreptitiously return to his apartment and retrieve his backup glasses. In order to avoid detection by a sick Sheldon and Penny, who is nursing him, Howard and Raj help him to navigate through the living room by using a helmet camera. Leonard also states in one episode that he has sleep apnea. He also has asthma, and in multiple episodes needs his inhaler in order to perform a variety of activities including sports and sex. During his relationship with Leslie Winkle, he tells her that many members of his family have died from heart disease and thus he has a genetic disposition to the condition.

=== Family ===
All of the members of Leonard's family are accomplished scientists, except for his younger brother Michael, who is a tenured law professor at Harvard University.

Leonard's mother, Dr. Beverly Hofstadter, is a psychiatrist and neuroscientist. She has a personality almost identical to Sheldon's, including strict speech patterns, lack of social conventions, and attention to detail, and she is principally responsible for Leonard's difficult childhood. Sheldon and Beverly have a friendly relationship where they share details of each other's lives, with Sheldon often failing to pass on significant information to Leonard such as Leonard's parents divorcing and the family dog Mitsy's death. Leonard is upset with the fact that she tells Sheldon more than she tells him, but later decides it's okay. After a night out bonding and drinking with Penny in which she notices an attractive busboy, Beverly kisses Sheldon but realizes she "would rather have the busboy".

Due to his mother's views, Leonard never celebrated his birthday or Christmas when he was a child, and when she visits him she is not impressed with his unoriginal research. Leonard reveals to Penny that he built a "hugging machine" when he was young in order to compensate for the lack of affection from his mother. He further states that his father used to borrow it. Beverly also belittles Leonard by pointing out that his brother and sister are more successful in their respective fields than he is. Leonard's brother, Michael, is a Harvard law professor and is engaged to the youngest appellate court judge in New Jersey history (who later goes to work with a Habitat for Humanity-esque organisation), and his older sister, whose name is unknown, is a cutting-edge medical researcher working with gibbons to cure diabetes. However, Beverly admits in season 11 that Leonard married the best out of his siblings, after she develops a genuine friendship with Penny. Leonard also dislikes his memories of Christmas, not just because he never celebrated it, but also because instead of gifts the Hofstadter kids had to turn in papers to "Santa" which were graded the next day. Over the course of six years, he never got above a "C minus", which according to Sheldon was a true gift, because by Sheldon's estimation he never deserved anything better. After the episode "The Peanut Reaction", Leonard begins celebrating his birthday after Penny throws him a birthday party upon hearing that he had never had one; he asks Brent Spiner to come to his birthday party at the end of "The Russian Rocket Reaction". As for Christmas, Leonard comes to love it as an adult, unlike Sheldon. Leonard had two childhood pets, a cat named Dr. Boots Hofstadter and a dog named Mitsy. Near the end of season 12, in "The Maternal Conclusion", Leonard's mother seems to be more supportive of her son's new job as co-lead of the University's Photon entanglement project, even spending time with Leonard as he shows her around his new laboratory. However, she reveals that she is doing research for her new book that highlights her parenting technique, directly resulting in the success of her children. This deeply upsets Leonard and Penny who thought that Beverly was making a genuine effort to better their mother-son relationship. Leonard finally confronts his mother, telling her of the many ways she has hurt him. After calming down, Leonard tearfully forgives his mother and himself for the emotional toll he has carried for most of his life. Beverly thanks her son for forgiving her and hugs him.

Leonard's father, Dr. Alfred Hofstadter is an anthropologist. Sheldon reveals that Leonard's middle name, "Leakey", comes from famed anthropologist Louis Leakey, with whom Leonard's father had worked. Leonard is embarrassed by his middle name and its humorous connotations, and rarely mentions it. Apparently, his father was not very affectionate towards him either; he mentions that he had to compete with the bones of an Etruscan boy for his father's attention, but this was likely because his father was away from home a lot for work and was not able to get to know his children well. However, they seem to have developed a good, affectionate rapport by the time of Leonard and Penny's impending second wedding ceremony in the season 9 finale.

When lamenting the possibility that the Hofstadter name would die out with him after Penny expresses a desire not to have children, Sheldon points out that not only does his brother Michael have children but that his sister has five sons who bore the surname Hofstadter.

Though little is known about Leonard's extended family, a few references to it are made. In the first episode, Sheldon and Leonard discuss Leonard's grandmother, who had visited them on Thanksgiving the year before. She has Alzheimer's disease and apparently "has an episode" during her visit, which results in her stripping off her clothes and carving the turkey. On Beverly's first visit, she tells Leonard that his uncle Floyd has died, which greatly upsets him (according to him, Floyd was the only family member he really liked and of whom Leonard has warm memories from his childhood). Leonard also has several other uncles, whom Sheldon says are all very bald; when they gather together, they look "like a half carton of eggs." Leonard describes his aunt, however, as "one of the hairiest women you'll ever meet". He also mentions an Aunt Nancy, apparently a "crazy cat lady" who had 25 cats, died, and was eaten by them.

=== Work ===
Leonard has an IQ of 173, and was 24 years old when he received his PhD from Princeton University. Leonard also received a dissertation of the year award for his doctoral paper on experimental particle physics.

Leonard was a child prodigy and a gifted scientist with an impressive knowledge of theoretical physics. His work as an experimental physicist often includes the use of lasers, such as a helium–neon laser or free-electron laser, and his research topics vary from Bose–Einstein condensates and foundations of quantum mechanics to soft cosmic rays at sea level and development of novel rocket propellants. Leonard designs experiments in order to test theories but, according to Sheldon, his work is mostly derivative and thus unimportant.

Although Leonard's attempts to disprove the existence of dark matter are made moot by the work of another physicist, Leonard helps to solidify proof of the hypothetical matter's existence with a photomultiplier, and is invited as keynote speaker to a topical conference by the Institute of Experimental Physics for his successful research on super solids.

In the season 6 finale, "The Bon Voyage Reaction" Leonard heads to the United Kingdom to work on a physics project seeking the hydrodynamics equivalent of the Unruh effect, sponsored by Professor Stephen Hawking, for three months on a ship in the North Sea.

In season 8, Leonard has a revelation about Superfluid Vacuum and with Sheldon's help is able to come up with a paper that impresses the scientific community including Stephen Hawking. This theory is later used as a foundation for a Quantum Guidance System that Sheldon, Leonard and Howard develop for the US Air Force in Season 10.

Near the end of season 12, Leonard is given the co-leadership of the University's Photon Entanglement project after trying to be more assertive.

=== Relationships ===
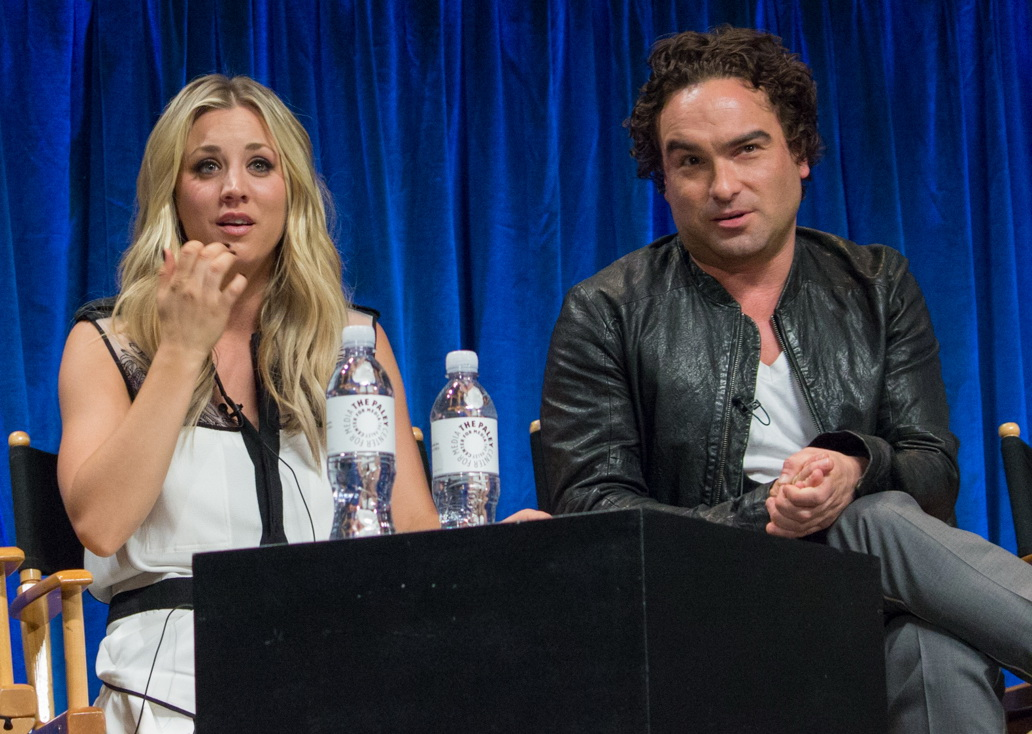
Kaley Cuoco (who portrays Penny) and Johnny Galecki at PaleyFest 2013

Leonard has stated in the series that he and Sheldon have a dysfunctional relationship, one that many times people have mistaken for a romantic one. People most likely assume that due to their familiarity with each other. Because of Sheldon’s strange tendencies, they known each other’s bathroom habits and schedules, among other things that ordinarily roommates would not know about each other.

Leonard becomes interested in Penny almost immediately after seeing her for the first time. His infatuation with Penny becomes the major force that drives the series during the first few seasons. By the end of the first season, Leonard finally manages to ask Penny out, and they have their first date. Subsequently, they do not go on any future dates after Penny asks Sheldon if Leonard ever dates "regular" women. She then tells Sheldon that she lied to Leonard about graduating from community college. When she asks Sheldon to keep it a secret, he cannot do it, so he moves out, first to Raj's, then to Howard's after Raj kicks him out. Howard gives him warm milk with a handful of his mother's Valium mixed in, so Sheldon is high and loopy when Howard takes him home to Leonard. In his high state, Leonard tricks him into telling him Penny's secret. The next day, Leonard gives Penny brochures for local colleges. Penny gets offended, thinking Leonard is calling her stupid, so they stop seeing each other.

Besides Penny, Leonard is involved with only a few other women. One of Leonard's former girlfriends who is mentioned on several occasions is Joyce Kim, who does not appear until the second season. Leonard's friends recall on many occasions that they were together for only 27 days, after which Joyce, later revealed to be a spy, defected to North Korea.

Initially, after feeling that Penny is not for him, Leonard turns his attention to fellow scientist Leslie Winkle. The first time Leonard asks Leslie out, she rejects him, and his further relationships with her prove to be only short-lived casual sexual encounters that happen to satisfy Leslie's libido. Leslie briefly starts dating Leonard in Season 2, which irritates Sheldon. Leslie and Sheldon get into an argument about String and Loop theories, Leonard sides with Sheldon. Leslie breaks up with Leonard by saying him believing in String theory is a "deal breaker".

In the second season, Leonard began a relationship with a physician named Stephanie Barnett (Sara Rue). Leonard meets Stephanie when Howard picks her up at a bar by telling her she could drive a car on Mars. He then gets the Mars Rover stuck. While Sheldon and Raj stay to help him fix the problem, Howard asks Leonard to take Stephanie home, where they start making out in his car. The two start seeing each other in secret, while Howard calls her all the time leaving messages asking her to meet his family. Leonard finally goes to Howard's house to tell him what is happening, but right as he goes to say it, Stephanie calls Howard and tells him first. Howard is extremely upset, refusing to talk to either of them, until Stephanie says she has a friend for Howard. Although the relationship goes well, even earning Sheldon's approval, Leonard feels uncomfortable with Stephanie moving in with him, and the relationship ends.

On another occasion, when Leonard's mother is visiting, he and Penny come very close to having sex, but Leonard ruins the moment by suggesting that they are burying their lifelong issues with their parents by doing so, which offends Penny. In the second-season finale, when Leonard, Sheldon, Howard, and Raj are due to leave for a three-month scientific expedition to the North Pole, Penny privately expresses sadness, and wishes that he would not leave.

In the third season premiere, Leonard and Penny finally start a romantic relationship and have intercourse for the first time. However, the relationship ends after eight months, after Leonard tells Penny he loves her and takes umbrage at her inability to reciprocate, which leads to friction that is exploited by guest star Wil Wheaton who appears as a fictionalized version of himself. He observes and exacerbates it in order to break them up in the middle of a bowling match Wheaton's team is having against Leonard, Penny, Sheldon, Howard and Raj.

Shortly after his breakup with Penny, in "The Plimpton Stimulation", Leonard has a one-night stand with Dr. Elizabeth Plimpton (Judy Greer), a physicist he admires, when Sheldon invites her to stay in their apartment for a brief visit. This encounter causes some tension between Leonard and Penny, who is somewhat judgmental of Leonard. However, the two later resolve their feelings and their friendship continues.

In the third-season finale, "The Lunar Excitation", after Penny's failed attempts to move on from her relationship with Leonard, she becomes intoxicated and has sex with him. In the morning, Leonard believes that their relationship has resumed, though Penny tells him that the previous night was a mistake. This causes a strain on their friendship; at the end of the episode, Leonard becomes intoxicated and tries to have intercourse with her, prompting Penny to push him out of her apartment, to which Leonard suspects a double standard. He immediately makes the same advances towards Leslie Winkle, who replies, 'Let me think about it" and slams the door in his face.

Throughout the fourth season, it becomes obvious that Penny is still in love with Leonard. It is unclear whether or not Leonard has noticed this, though he clearly is still interested in Penny. In "The Benefactor Factor", an older rich woman (Jessica Walter) propositions Leonard in exchange for a large donation to the physics department; he initially resists and she admits that she planned to make the donation anyway, after which they engage in a one-night stand. Leonard arrives home the next morning, whereupon Penny recognizes his "walk of shame" and Sheldon thinks Leonard has a future in becoming a gigolo to rich ladies in exchange for donations.

Leonard also has a sexual relationship with Raj's younger sister Priya (apparently every time she comes to town), despite a pinky swear with Howard that neither of them would attempt to make a move on her, and Raj giving his strong disapproval. When Priya returns, she and Leonard begin a relationship. Raj strongly opposes this, and Penny is secretly uncomfortable with Leonard dating someone else, eventually breaking down and crying while talking with her friend Amy Farrah Fowler. Once again, Leonard is unaware of Penny's true feelings. Subsequently, Priya pressures Leonard into ending his friendship with Penny, which he attempts with extreme reluctance. Penny complies, though it is clear that she does not want Leonard out of her life. Penny eventually resolves to stay in Leonard's life by ingratiating herself to Priya.

In the Season 4 finale, Leonard runs into Penny and Raj as they come out of his room in the morning after having slept together, just after Leonard and Priya appear to break up upon Leonard's learning that Priya is soon moving back to India. At the start of Season 5, it is revealed Raj and Penny did not actually sleep together. Leonard and Priya try to maintain a long-distance relationship via Skype (including a failed attempt at cybersex) with Priya continuing to treat Leonard like a submissive partner. Despite being the most eager to have sex, Leonard proves he is quite awkward in these situations. Leonard later goes to a wedding with Amy, and Leonard spends most of the time acting depressed and moping. Amy talks to him and makes him feel better, even getting him to dance. When they are walking up the stairs to Leonard's apartment, he says he pulled something in his crotch doing the Hokey Pokey, and thanks Amy for breaking the head off the ice swan sculpture to help him. They seem to take a liking to each other, leading Amy to tell Penny that she accidentally made Leonard fall in love with her, but even though she "would love to know they had both been defiled by the same man", Sheldon is the only man she wants. When Leonard tells Sheldon that he had a great time but his "crotch is a little worse for wear" Sheldon gets upset, karate-chopping Leonard and saying, "She's not for you...not for you!". Later, despite feeling that he and Priya were in love and might get married, Leonard finds himself attracted to a comic book artist named Alice. The attraction is mutual, and they even share a kiss. Right when they are about to have sex, however, he tells Alice that he has a girlfriend, thus ending the relationship. Leonard then decides to confess his behavior to Priya via Skype, but his shocked to learn that Priya has also betrayed him, sleeping with her former boyfriend. Priya defends that they both slipped up a little, but Leonard corrects her saying that he slipped a little, while she slipped a lot, bringing the conversation to a strained end. In the next episode, Leonard tells Sheldon that he is single.

Through the fourth and fifth seasons, Penny is still single and dating, however, it's evident she confesses drunkenly that she regrets breaking up with him. In "The Ornithophobia Diffusion", Leonard and Penny go to the movies as friends. Leonard decides that since they are no longer dating, he can be honest and does not have to pay for everything or do whatever Penny wants. The two bicker all evening and sabotage each other's attempts to chat up people in the bar. They decide that "sex is off the table" for them. Penny admits that she likes the new, more assertive Leonard. So Leonard tells her that "Sex IS on the table".

On the spur of the moment in "The Recombination Hypothesis", Leonard asks Penny out on a date after he imagines what getting back with her might be like. Their real date ends successfully and they agree to take their relationship slow in "The Beta Test Initiation." During their renewed relationship, Penny dismisses comments about him ever leaving or dumping her or about worrying about his unfaithfulness around other women and strippers as in the episode "The Stag Convergence". After Penny suggests having sex in "The Launch Acceleration", Leonard breaks the mood by proposing to her accidentally. They later meet and Penny has the courage to tell him "no" and not break up with him as she did two years previously when he told her that he loved her. However, their relationship is still strained. In the season 5 finale, Leonard and Penny watch Howard being launched into space while holding hands to comfort each other. With the start of season 6, he wants a reluctant Penny to define their relationship in "The Date Night Variable".

In the "Higgs Boson Observation", Sheldon hires grad student Alex Jensen to review his childhood journals for any potential ideas that might win him a Nobel Prize. After Amy and Penny observe Alex and Leonard in the Caltech cafeteria talking, Penny, although having reservations about her relationship with Leonard, is bothered with the thought of him with another woman. Later that day, Alex comes home with Sheldon to work in the apartment. Penny introduces herself to Alex and drags Leonard to her apartment to have sex. Penny finally admits her love to Leonard in "The 43 Peculiarity". Penny and Leonard awkwardly stare at each other before running off in opposite directions. Leonard, though, is buoyed by optimism over Penny's admission. Alex Jensen asks Leonard out to dinner in "The Egg Salad Equivalency", which boosts Leonard's ego because two beautiful women are interested in him, however, Alex's interest makes Penny insecure. Leonard later confirms his commitment to Penny and reassures her that nothing will happen between him and Alex. After another dispute with Sheldon, Leonard tries to move in with Penny in "The Spoiler Alert Segmentation", however she is not ready. During their Valentine's Day dinner in "The Tangible Affection Proof", Leonard again tries to propose to Penny and she cuts him off quickly. She admits that she is very happy with him, but she also admits to commitment issues and the thought of being married forever "freaks" her out. Leonard then tells her that when she is ready to get married, she can propose to him. In the season finale, Leonard leaves for an overseas job for four months and Penny is confident enough in their relationship to wait for him. In "The Gorilla Dissolution", Leonard and Penny become engaged. Throughout season 8, a running gag is their reluctance to decide upon a wedding date. In the season 8 finale, Penny asks Leonard to marry her that night in Las Vegas. Leonard happily accepts, but during the journey, after Penny expresses happiness that they will get married while knowing everything about each other, Leonard confesses to having shared a drunken kiss with another woman while on the boat in Europe, though he adds that the woman started it and he rejected her. Penny becomes hurt by the revelation, and even though she claims to forgive Leonard, there is tension between them, leaving the season ending in a cliffhanger as to whether or not they will go through with the wedding.

At the beginning of season 9, Leonard and Penny marry, although not without some initial problems. They both reveal that they were subconsciously trying to sabotage their relationship, feeling unworthy of the other. Leonard meets with the woman he kissed on the boat. She barely remembers the incident and quickly grows bored with Leonard's ramblings, taking a sarcastic and dismissive tone toward him. From that meeting, Leonard comes to terms with his insecurities and he and Penny are able to become more comfortable in dealing with their mutual fears about their relationship. Leonard tries to move into Penny's apartment though Sheldon has serious objections and makes them compromise to spend multiple nights a week in Leonard's old room. Early in season 10, the couple is very happy to be finally living alone after Sheldon moves in with Amy.

In season 11, Leonard, Howard and Raj are trying to recover the bitcoin they mined years ago (now worth thousands of dollars). It is revealed that the bitcoin is in Leonard's old laptop which he gave to Penny while they were dating in Season 3. Penny says that she gave the laptop to Zack after her breakup with Leonard. After retrieving the laptop from Zack, he shows the couple a video in the laptop that Penny made after her breakup with Leonard showing a drunk Penny apologizing to Leonard and regretting breaking up with him. Leonard is touched by the video and realizes that Penny genuinely loves him.

In the twelfth and final season, Penny announces that she does not want to have any children which Leonard somewhat reluctantly supports. Later Penny's old boyfriend Zack Johnson and his new wife want Leonard to be a surrogate father to their kid since Zack is infertile. Penny reluctantly agrees to let Leonard do it until Leonard finally changes his mind not wanting a child in the world that he cannot raise. At the end of the season, however, Penny accidentally gets pregnant with Leonard's child, and changes her mind about wanting children.

== See also ==
- List of The Big Bang Theory characters
