= Penny (The Big Bang Theory) =

Fictional character on The Big Bang Theory

Penny Hofstadter
- The Big Bang Theory character
- Kaley Cuoco as Penny Hofstadter
- First appearance: "Pilot"; The Big Bang Theory; September 24, 2007
- Last appearance: "Spoiler: We're as Confused as You Are"; Stuart Fails to Save the Universe; September 10, 2026
- Created by: Chuck Lorre; Bill Prady
- Portrayed by: Kaley Cuoco; Quinn Aune (Young Sheldon)

In-universe information
- Full name: Penelope "Penny" Hofstadter
- Gender: Female
- Occupation: Waitress (seasons 1–7); Actress (seasons 1–7); Pharmaceutical sales representative (seasons 8–12)
- Spouses: Zack Johnson (mistake, annulled) Leonard Hofstadter (m. 2015)
- Children: Unknown unborn child
- Origin: Omaha, Nebraska
- Nationality: USA

Penelope "Penny" Hofstadter is a fictional character from the 2007–2019 American CBS sitcom The Big Bang Theory, portrayed by actress Kaley Cuoco. She is the primary female character in the series, befriending her neighbors Sheldon Cooper (Jim Parsons) and her future husband Leonard Hofstadter (Johnny Galecki), two physicists employed at the California Institute of Technology (Caltech).

Penny's lack of higher education sets her apart from the group, and her outgoing personality and social aptitude drastically contrast with their more introverted and socially awkward personalities, especially the male characters. She is the primary love interest of Leonard, who briefly dates her during the third season. This relationship is later resumed in the fifth season and culminates in their engagement at the end of the seventh season and their wedding at the start of season nine. Penny mentioned to Sheldon that she was aware that Leonard had "a tiny crush" on her after he first asked her out. Sheldon likened this to Menalaus’s interest in Helen of Troy in classical mythology.

== Development ==
In the original, unaired pilot of The Big Bang Theory, the conception of the female lead was very different. She was called Katie, and was envisioned as "a street-hardened, tough-as-nails woman with a vulnerable interior". Sheldon and Leonard would "approach her with honesty, to draw the real, sensitive Katie out". The role was played by Amanda Walsh. However, the test audiences reacted to the character negatively, seeing her as too mean. Because of this, the character was changed, and the role was recast. Marisa Tomei, Tara Reid, Elizabeth Berkley, and Jodi Lyn O'Keefe were all also considered for the role.

In the show's early seasons, Penny was portrayed as a young woman who was out of Leonard's social league. But the character developed into a more complex individual with high emotional intelligence, social skills, and work ethic. She became integral, and eventually, pivotal, to the friend group consisting of Leonard, Sheldon, herself, Howard, Bernadette, Raj and Amy, and was there for them all over the years, particularly as a sister-come-motherly figure to Sheldon. She even won plaudits from Leonard’s mother who, save for an empathy with Sheldon, was prone to be dismissive of almost everyone and everything.

== Characterization ==
=== Personality ===
Penny is from a small town outside of Omaha, Nebraska.

She has full confidence in pseudoscientific concepts such as horoscopes, psychics, and Voodoo, which has led to repeated mocking from both Sheldon and Leonard (primarily the former) along with criticisms of their accuracy.

Unlike the other main characters, Penny has no university education or specialist field of expertise. She is portrayed as more socially adept and streetwise than her neighbors, and as familiar with popular culture. At home she is shown as untidy and disorganized, and she is careless in both personal and financial matters.

Having dropped out of community college prior to the start of the series, she is the only regular character with less education than Howard Wolowitz, who has a master's degree. In season six, she returns to college, taking a history class and hiding it from the rest of the group. She initially performs terribly in her college classes. It is revealed in later seasons that Penny has continued her education, taking both an acting and a psychology class.

When she is expressing feelings of anger or frustration, other characters have compared her to The Hulk, a "rabid wolverine", and "killer robots".

Penny's questionable driving ability and failure to maintain her vehicle are acknowledged throughout the series. She is known to ignore her check engine light and has left her passenger side wing mirror in a parking lot somewhere in Hollywood after trying to park her car. She also hit a Mercedes in a parking lot and knocked the side-view mirror off Bernadette's car; not leaving a note in either incident. In season seven, her car engine fails and she receives a new car from Leonard.

In the fifth-season episode "The Speckerman Recurrence", Penny is revealed to have unknowingly been a bully while in school. She attempts to make amends with a classmate she tormented, and although she does her best, she sees little success.

Another recurring personality trait is her ability to consume large amounts of alcohol, especially wine. In "The Flaming Spittoon Acquisition", while spending the evening with Bernadette and Amy, Penny observes that they have finished the bottle of wine, and when Bernadette and Amy point out that they consumed only half a glass and no wine at all, respectively, Penny snaps, "Okay, don't judge me! So, what do you want to do, go to the movies, go dancing, lay down for a little bit?" At the end of that episode, she passes out while the three of them play Twister, and when Bernadette initially fails to revive her, she says "Penny, we're out of wine", which manages to wake Penny. In "The Intimacy Acceleration", Sheldon asks her, "If you could wake up tomorrow having gained any one quality or ability, what would it be?" Penny replies, "Well, not to steal from the Bible, but turning water into wine sounds pretty good." Then, in "The Locomotive Manipulation", Leonard declines Amy's suggestion that the group spends a weekend in Napa Valley, leading to this exchange:

Leonard: "I'm not sure it's a great idea to take Penny to where wine comes from. (Looks at Penny) What? It's a joke. Oh, come on. We bust on each other. I wear dorky glasses, you might have a problem, it's all for laughs."
Penny: "That would really piss me off if I didn't have a buzz going on."

In spin-off Stuart Fails to Save the Universe, Penny appears in one alternative reality as the headstrong leader of a resistance group against a malevolent AI that suppresses people's aggression with neck implants. Zack acts as her second-in-command until the AI's drones attack their base.

==== Nerd traits ====
A number of episodes depict Penny's assimilation of nerd culture through her time spent with the men, and she has quoted some science fiction shows (like Star Trek) and movies (Star Wars). After Sheldon introduces her to the online role-playing game Age of Conan, Penny becomes addicted to the point of ignoring her friends, hygiene, general appearance and job, pestering Sheldon incessantly for gaming advice. This likely resulted from frustration with her life at that point, believing herself to be a failure in most aspects of her life. She overcomes her addiction when she realizes she has agreed to go on a virtual date within the game with Howard. Penny has also displayed proficiency in playing Halo 3 and Fortnite despite being a complete newbie, annoying Sheldon (and Bernadette). In "The Veracity Elasticity", she demonstrates fluency in Ubbi dubbi by having a secret conversation with Amy Farrah Fowler in front of Sheldon and Leonard when the guys are having their own secret conversation in Klingon.

In season three, she asks Sheldon to teach her "a little physics" so she can talk to Leonard about his job (like Bernadette does). She manages to recite a brief summary (obviously written by Sheldon for her to memorize) of Leonard's experiment during dinner, which puzzles Leonard, Howard, and Raj. In a later episode, she buys a pair of faux spectacles so that she can look like a scientist without needing to acquire the relevant knowledge. However, the main outcome of this is that Leonard gets so excited when she lowers her glasses and says “molecules” that he coaxes her towards their bedroom.

In episodes such as "The Apology Insufficiency", "The Dead Hooker Juxtaposition", "The Wheaton Recurrence", and "The Love Car Displacement", she makes casual references to Star Trek. In "The Bakersfield Expedition", Penny, Amy and Bernadette read some of the men's comics, believing there is nothing interesting in them, only to get into a heated argument about whether or not only Thor could wield his enchanted hammer Mjolnir. In season seven's "The Proton Transmogrification", she alarms herself when she realizes that she understands Raj and Howard's corny Star Wars-related puns. In "The Werewolf Transformation", although a complete beginner, she has beaten Leonard in chess despite not knowing the names of the chess pieces. Leonard later expressed astonishment that his girlfriend plays like Bobby Fischer. However, it has been suggested by Sheldon in an earlier episode that Leonard is not very good at chess, although Penny's commentary suggests she has a solid enough theoretical grasp of the game.

Penny sometimes references science and technology-related ideas. In "The Codpiece Topology", Penny, having previously learned of Schrödinger's cat in "The Tangerine Factor", is seen explaining that concept to her date. In "The Beta Test Initiation", Penny references beta testing when Leonard uses a software development analogy, to describe their attempt to start a romantic relationship again, although he points out he was technically talking about alpha testing.

Penny's intelligence often varies based on the episodes needs. In early episodes she is portrayed as somewhat naive and unintelligent, but in quite a few episodes she shows herself to be far more astute.

=== Financial issues ===
A recurring theme throughout the series is Penny's ongoing financial problems and poverty. This is seen in "The Financial Permeability", when she finds herself behind on her bills, and borrows money from Sheldon, only to later become paranoid into thinking that he is pestering her for repayment, even though he makes no such indications of this – he misinterprets Penny's paranoia and even offers her more money, while Leonard points out that one of the few things about Sheldon that isn't insufferable is that he genuinely doesn't care about how long it will take to repay the money. Other references are seen in the fact that she once attempted to pay for her electric bill using a Starbucks gift card, an apology note and pictures of her in underwear.

A subset of this trait is addressed by other characters is her freeloading. In the second-season episode "The Financial Permeability", when Penny is short on money, Leonard pays for her share of a group dinner, which causes Raj and Howard to joke that they would get free food too if they wore skintight jeans and a tank top. A recurring gag in the fourth season is Sheldon's frequent change of his and Leonard's Wi-Fi password to address Penny's use of their signal. In "The Thespian Catalyst", he changes the password to "Penny is a freeloader", in "The Roommate Transmogrification" he has changed it to "Penny, get your own Wi-Fi", and in the episode "The Speckerman Recurrence", he has changed it into "Penny already eats our food, she can pay for Wi-Fi". In the seventh season "The Convention Conundrum", when the women go out for drinks and ponder their own maturity, and Penny questions the significance of that trait, Bernadette replies that it would mean that their check would be split three ways.

Penny's financial situation radically improves when she begins working as a sales representative at the pharmaceutical company that employs Bernadette, in the eighth-season episode "The Locomotion Interruption". By "The Expedition Approximation", she is making enough money to be financially self-sufficient, able to sell the automobile Leonard previously gave her, and gives him back the money for it—changing their dynamic and leading to discussions on whether her future financial windfalls may prove difficult for him, given his insecurities. This situation was later exacerbated when it was revealed that Penny was earning significantly more than Leonard.

In the ninth-season episode "The Big Bear Precipitation", Penny reveals she hates her job as a representative but sticks with it because she still has large debts to pay and also does not want to go back to waitressing or acting.

=== Work ===
Penny initially moves to California in the hopes of becoming an actress.

Until the seventh season, Penny works predominantly as a waitress at her local The Cheesecake Factory, although in the first-season episode "The Grasshopper Experiment" she trained as a bartender. It seemed that she occasionally picked up the bartending shift in the restaurant. In 2010, when actress Kaley Cuoco broke her leg, Penny was shown working as a bartender in several fourth-season episodes to hide the cast on her leg.

Her work at The Cheesecake Factory was initially meant to be a temporary job for her desired profession as an actress, although her expectations are somewhat high and naive at the beginning. She admits in season two that her plan was to be a waitress for six months and then become a movie star, and her backup plan was to become a TV star. She regularly goes to castings but is most often unsuccessful or finds the role to be quite different from what she expected, as when a cat food commercial audition was actually for a pornographic film. In the season one episode "The Loobenfeld Decay", she is cast in a production of Rent, and in "The Terminator Decoupling" she refers to another of her roles as "Anne Frank in a theater above a bowling alley". Frustrated with her acting career, in the fifth-season premiere, she briefly considers returning to Nebraska until landing a part in a commercial for hemorrhoid cream. In "The Monster Isolation", Penny is seen performing the role of Blanche DuBois in her acting class's production of A Streetcar Named Desire. In this episode, Sheldon, who attended the show along with Leonard and Amy, is impressed with Penny's ability to memorize lines despite not remembering customers' orders as a waitress. In the seventh-season premiere, she was revealed to have had a topless shower scene in a low-budget horror film named "Serial Apeist" when she first moved to California, which she did not realise had been uploaded to the internet until Sheldon revealed it was available online and that the gang saw it on the day they met her.

In the season seven episode "The Hesitation Ramification", Penny believes she found stardom when she lands a brief role in NCIS. She is devastated when her scene is cut, but later decides it is time to focus solely on acting; she quits her job at The Cheesecake Factory to devote herself to becoming an actress.

Despite usually going to her neighbors for technical assistance when she has problems with her computer, Penny does have some mechanical skills of her own. When she was a child, she rebuilt a tractor engine on the farm where she grew up and competed in a junior rodeo.

During season eight, Penny abandons acting and takes a job as a salesperson at Bernadette's pharmaceutical company. The following season, Penny admits that she hates flirting with her customers for sales. In season ten, she almost changed her job when her ex-boyfriend Zack (Brian Thomas Smith) offers her a position at his menu company. Leonard reluctantly supports her but when she called Zack to accept the job, Zack informs her that his fiancée does not like the idea of Penny working with Zack (given their history). In season twelve, Bernadette gets Penny to head the sales team to promote her new drug in "The Confirmation Polarization". After a competitor tries to recruit Penny in "The Conference Valuation", Bernadette assures Penny that she is great at her job, elevating Penny's sense of self-worth.

=== Relationships ===
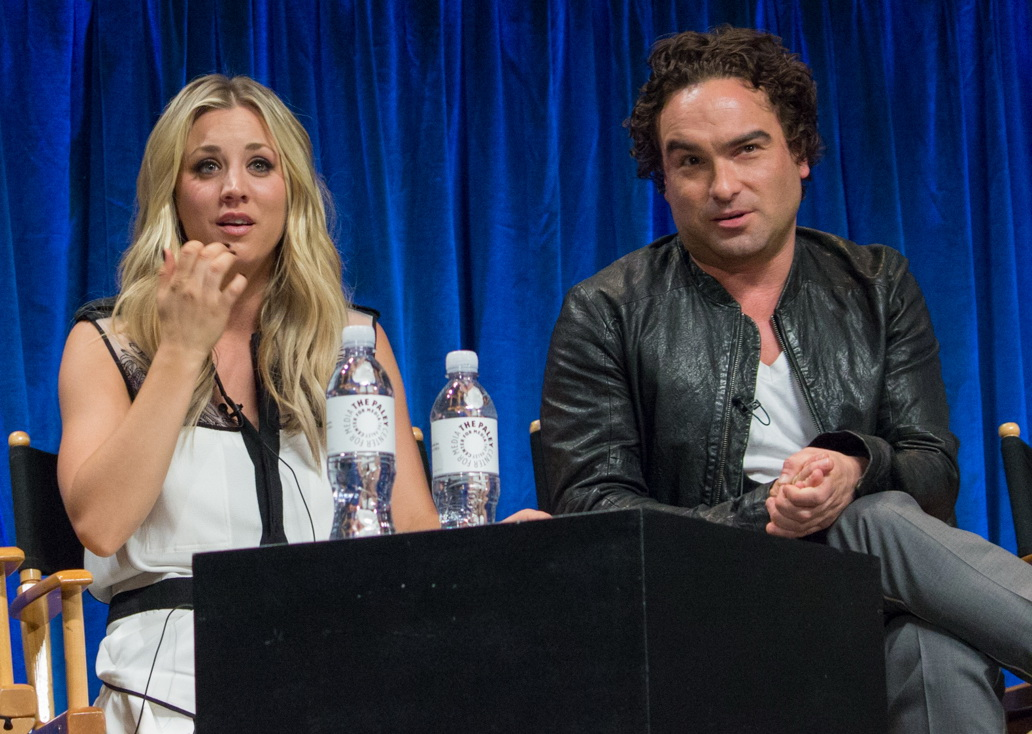
Kaley Cuoco and Johnny Galecki (who portrays Leonard) at PaleyFest

Unlike the rest of the main characters (aside from Bernadette), Penny is an extrovert. She is very outgoing and assertive, and has many sexual relationships over the course of the series. She often dates, and in one way or another all the men have gone to her for dating advice. In the fourth season opener, Sheldon estimates that Penny has dated 193 men, and had sex with 31 of them. Penny strenuously denies it was ever that many. Amy, who had initially asked Penny if she had “had sexual intercourse with all these [193] men”, enquired of her in the same conversation if, in light of her sex partners, she considers herself a "slut", Penny responds with uncertainty, "No. No. ... No?"

In the series premiere, Penny moves in across the hall from Leonard and Sheldon because of her recent split from her boyfriend, Kurt, after living together for four years. She says she still loves him, even though he cheated on her. Kurt makes two more appearances in the series.

Howard shows interest in her (primarily sexual), but he is always rejected abruptly due to his unsettling approaches. Although Penny occasionally teases Raj for his inability to speak to her, she is sympathetic and kind towards him and, as with Sheldon, she almost always overlooks his idiosyncrasies and appreciates that his intentions are good.

In the first-season episode "The Fuzzy Boots Corollary", Penny describes her approach after a failed relationship: she picks up an attractive man to have rebound sex with over the course of a 36-hour weekend, then leaves him.

==== Leonard ====
From the beginning, Leonard's infatuation with Penny becomes a major force that drives the series. In the first-season finale, Penny breaks up with her boyfriend after he posts intimate details about their private life on his blog. This gives Leonard the opportunity to ask her on a first official date. Although the date is successful, Penny becomes worried after she lies to Leonard about graduating from community college (it is mentioned in a later episode, "The Cohabitation Formulation", that she was enrolled in one, but dropped out). When Sheldon asks her why she lied, she indicates that she is self-conscious about their comparative level of education. Leonard eventually learns the truth, but makes matters worse when he tries to encourage Penny to enroll in Pasadena City College, as Penny interprets his suggestion as an insult to her intelligence, and rebuffs him.

In "The Maternal Capacitance", Penny's introduction to Leonard's mother, Dr. Beverly Hofstadter, causes Penny and Leonard to seek comfort in each other. They nearly have sex, but when Leonard comments in bed that she was attracted to him because of a psychological need to be closer to her father, her revulsion at this causes her to rebuff him.

Afterwards, Penny dates Stuart, from the comic book store, but their dates do not lead to a relationship. The first time, Penny and Stuart are interrupted by Sheldon, who argues at length with Stuart over whether Dick Grayson or Jason Todd should be Batman's successor, while Penny falls asleep. Their dating ends in "The Classified Materials Turbulence", when Penny and Stuart are kissing, and Penny mistakenly calls him "Leonard".

In the second-season finale Penny shows strong romantic feelings for Leonard. When she discovers that Leonard, Sheldon, Howard, and Raj will be spending three months at the magnetic North Pole for a scientific experiment, she becomes sad and gives Leonard a Snuggie and a long hug, that Leonard perceives as unusually long. Although Penny dismisses the meaning into which Leonard reads the gift and the hug, she later admits to herself that it meant that she did not want him to leave.

In the third-season premiere, after the men returned from the expedition, Penny kisses Leonard immediately upon his return, having missed him immensely. Initially, Leonard and Penny feel uncomfortable with their new relationship, and they agree to remain only friends, but are unable to maintain this resolution and began a stable relationship. Their relationship sours, however, when Leonard tells Penny he loves her for the first time, and an unsure Penny simply replies, "Thank you." The resulting tension eventually leads to Penny tearfully breaking up with Leonard during a bowling match. However, they remain friends and sleep together once after Penny gets drunk following a bad date with Zack Johnson, after she realizes Leonard ruined her ability to tolerate and date unintelligent men.

In the fourth season, Penny reveals to her friends Bernadette Rostenkowski and Amy Farrah Fowler during a "Truth or Dare?" game that she has still not moved on from Leonard. This is further implied in "The Justice League Recombination" when she indicates to Leonard that her reunion with Zack, and Zack's decision to have the two of them join the men in dressing up as the Justice League for New Year's Eve costume party at Stuart's comic shop is made difficult by her history with Leonard. In "The Love Car Displacement", Penny and the rest of the cast attend an academic conference in Big Sur. She and Leonard share the same hotel room for the night and they almost have sex until Raj walks in on them. The next day, bored with the conference, Penny accepts a ride back to Los Angeles from Professor Glenn, Bernadette's tall and attractive ex-boyfriend. When Raj's sister, Priya, returns in the episode "The Cohabitation Formulation", Priya and Leonard begin a romantic relationship. Penny appears to be initially accepting of their relationship, but is later discovered by Amy to be heartbroken over it.

In the fourth-season finale, Penny reveals to Raj that she made a huge mistake by breaking up with Leonard. However, even though she and Raj both agree to be friends, they get drunk and wake up in bed together, apparently both naked, the next morning. Leonard, Sheldon, and Howard discover Penny leaving the apartment, deducing that they just had sex. In the fifth-season premiere, Raj confides to her that they had not consummated their encounter and instead just fell asleep, prompting Penny to refer to Raj as "Quickdraw" because of that. She spends the rest of the episode with Amy, avoiding the men due to her embarrassment over her encounter with Raj.

In "The Ornithophobia Diffusion" Leonard and Penny go on a platonic date as friends, but after Leonard decides that he does not have to pay for everything or defer to her because they are not a couple, they end up bickering and sabotaging each other's attempts to socialize with members of the opposite sex. Penny realizes that she finds Leonard's more assertive demeanor attractive, but when he regresses to groveling in order to have sex with her, she rebuffs him.

On the spur of the moment in "The Recombination Hypothesis", Leonard asks Penny out on a date after he imagines what getting back with her might be like. In "The Beta Test Initiation", their date goes well until Leonard asks about the status of their relationship. This causes conflict, due to Penny's subsequent admission that commitment frightens her, but they agree to take their relationship slowly. While having sex in "The Launch Acceleration", however, Leonard accidentally proposes to her, causing Penny great distress. After discussing the matter, Penny declines his proposal, while affirming her feelings for him, and her desire to remain with him. In the sixth-season episode "The Date Night Variable", Leonard wants a reluctant Penny to define their relationship. In "The Decoupling Fluctuation", she wonders if she is really in love with him, but cannot bring herself to discuss it with Leonard. In "The Date Night Variable", Raj shows up unannounced at a private dinner of Penny and Leonard's, and inserts himself into their discussion of where their relationship is headed. When Leonard complains that Penny has yet to say "I love you" to Leonard, Raj attempts to get her to say it, causing Penny to eject him from the apartment.

In the "Higgs Boson Observation", Sheldon hires grad student Alex Jensen to review his childhood journals for any potential ideas that might win him a Nobel Prize. After Amy and Penny observes Alex and Leonard in the Caltech cafeteria talking, Penny, although having reservations with her relationship with Leonard, is bothered with the thought of him with another woman. Later that day, Alex comes home with Sheldon to work in his apartment where Leonard and Penny are. Penny introduces herself to Alex (subtly implying that Leonard is hers) and drags Leonard to her apartment to have sex. In "The 43 Peculiarity", Leonard becomes jealous of Penny's classmate, an attractive Englishman. At the end of the episode, Penny and Leonard discuss this, during which Penny casually mentions that she loves him, which Leonard notes is the first time she has said this to him. In "The Egg Salad Equivalency" Penny learns that Sheldon's attractive assistant Alex asked Leonard out to dinner and eventually admits to Leonard her own insecurity about their relationship. After a major argument with Sheldon, Leonard suggests moving in with Penny in "The Spoiler Alert Segmentation", but she indicates that she is not ready for this. In "The Tangible Affection Proof", upon seeing her ex-boyfriend propose to the woman he cheated on her with during a Valentine's Day dinner date, Leonard again tries to propose to Penny, but she expresses that she is not ready for this, and is unnerved by that level of commitment. They resolve that when she is ready to get married, she can propose to him. In "The Bon Voyage Reaction", Penny copes with Leonard leaving for a summer science assignment in Europe, resolving that they are more secure in their relationship.

In "The Hesitation Ramification", Penny, inebriated and frustrated over the state of her acting career, proposes to Leonard, who is hesitant to answer, given the circumstances. Though this further frustrates Penny, she admits in the following episode, "The Occupation Recalibration", that Leonard did the right thing.

By season five, Penny has formed strong friendships with Doctors Amy Farrah Fowler and Bernadette Rostenkowski, and the three are often seen spending time together. However, Amy and Bernadette occasionally prefer to meet without Penny, and often tease her.

In the seventh-season episode "The Thanksgiving Decoupling", it was revealed that Penny had married Zack in Las Vegas in what they thought as a "fake" wedding. This revelation causes tension between her and Leonard who has repeatedly proposed to Penny but was always rejected. They managed to annul the wedding by getting Zack to sign the annulment papers. In the penultimate episode of season seven, "The Gorilla Dissolution", she and Leonard become engaged, after Penny realizes that it is not fame she wants out of life, but happiness with Leonard. Throughout season eight, a running gag is their reluctance to decide upon a wedding date. In the eighth-season finale, Penny asks Leonard to marry her that night in Las Vegas. Leonard happily accepts, but during the journey, after Penny expresses happiness that they will get married while knowing everything about each other, Leonard confesses to having shared a drunken kiss with another woman while on the boat in Europe, though he adds that the woman started it and he rejected her. Penny becomes hurt by the revelation, and even though she claims to forgive Leonard, there is clearly tension between them, leaving the season ending in a cliffhanger as to whether or not they will go through with the wedding.

At the beginning of season nine, Leonard and Penny marry, although not without some initial problems. They both reveal that they were subconsciously trying to sabotage their relationship, feeling unworthy of the other. Upon addressing this topic, they both agree to stop being scared of losing the other and embrace their happiness together. After an aborted attempt for Leonard to move into Penny's apartment and live with his wife, Sheldon forces them to spend most of the nights a week in Leonard's old room. Although CBS now refers to the character with the married name Penny Hofstadter, it has not been explicitly indicated in series whether she took Leonard's surname. By the ninth-season finale, Penny and Leonard decide to have a second small, unofficial wedding ceremony for their family and friends to make up for eloping. In season ten, Sheldon moves into Penny's old apartment with Amy, allowing Penny and Leonard to live on their own as husband and wife.

In season eleven, Leonard, Howard and Raj are trying to recover the bitcoin they mined years ago (now worth thousands of dollars). It is revealed that the bitcoin is in Leonard's old laptop which he gave to Penny while they were dating in season three. Penny then said that she gave the laptop to Zack after her breakup with Leonard. After retrieving the laptop, Zack shows the couple a video in the laptop that Penny made after her breakup with Leonard showing a drunk Penny apologizing to Leonard and regrets breaking up with him. Leonard is touched by the video and realizes that Penny genuinely loves him and not just out of desperation or pity.

In season twelve, Penny announces that she does not want to have any children which Leonard somewhat reluctantly supports her decision. Later, Zack and his wife Marissa want Leonard to be a surrogate father to their kid since Zack is infertile. Penny reluctantly agrees to let Leonard donate his sperm. However, Penny tries to seduce Leonard by dressing in cheerleader-style lingerie despite knowing he has to be abstinent for a few days. Her visiting father, Wyatt, points out to Penny that her own actions suggest she is more conflicted over having kids than she lets on, to which she admits she feels bad about letting him and Leonard down if she goes through with never having children. He says that despite her flaws, parenthood is the best thing that ever happened to him and he does not want her to miss out, but he says he will support her no matter what she decides. Leonard finally changes his mind about donating his sperm to Zack, not wanting a child in the world that he cannot raise. In the series finale, Penny reveals to her friends that she is pregnant with her and Leonard's baby, and changes her mind about not wanting children.

==== Sheldon ====
A staple of the series' humor is Penny's awkward interactions with Sheldon, as they are almost polar opposites in terms of intellect and social aptitude. Throughout the series Sheldon often insults Penny's level of formal education, but appreciates her advice when navigating social situations.

In one episode, Sheldon tries to "improve" Penny, rewarding her with chocolate for what he considers "correct behavior", as in operant conditioning of lab rats. Leonard noticed it and accused Sheldon of training her like Pavlov's dogs. Although the two characters sometimes clash, and Penny is frequently irritated by Sheldon's obstinacy and lack of social awareness, she developed a conspicuous soft spot for him as the series progressed. She and Leonard occasionally talk and behave as if Sheldon were their child (alluded to earlier in the third-season episode "The Spaghetti Catalyst" during the final seven minutes [see next paragraph], and in the eleventh-season episode "The Collaboration Contamination" when Penny actually uses a parenting book of Bernadette's on Sheldon). Penny is delighted whenever Sheldon acts affectionately towards her, recognizing that such behaviour is highly unusual for him. Penny often calls Sheldon "sweetie", a term of endearment she frequently uses with other characters (a fact that Sheldon himself points out in one episode), and Penny and Amy are the only principal characters who ever openly demonstrate their genuine fondness for Sheldon.

Evidence of Penny's affection for Sheldon is apparent in various episodes. Penny takes care of Sheldon while he is ill and lets him stay at her apartment when he is locked out of his, has a bad dream or is feeling unsafe; Sheldon lent her money when she needed it and takes care of her when she dislocates her shoulder. Despite not being as well versed as the men in geek culture, Penny has shown attention to what each of her friends likes, although she still remains dismissive of them: during a Christmas episode, Sheldon is overwhelmed when Penny gives him a napkin autographed by Leonard Nimoy. In return, Sheldon gives Penny several baskets of bath products and then a long hug, to both her and Leonard's surprise – Leonard claims it to be "a Saturnalian miracle". When Sheldon's World of Warcraft account is hacked and the four men all back down from the much larger hacker who also steals Sheldon's Klingon Bat'leth, Penny kicks the hacker in the groin. Following her breakup with Leonard, Penny takes Sheldon along when she and some friends from work went to Disneyland, for which he is thankful. In the same episode, "The Spaghetti Catalyst", she notes that she takes Sheldon shopping for his linens. (This episode shows Leonard and Penny speaking to each other in the manner of a divorced couple arguing over Sheldon as though he were their child.) She has also helped Sheldon resolve conflicts with Amy, as in "The Shiny Trinket Manoeuvre".

In "The Panty Pinata Polarization" Penny has a fight with Sheldon as he banishes her from his apartment and using their Wi-Fi as she got "three strikes". She defends herself by refusing to take down his order at the restaurant (later suggesting that she tampered with his food after being forced to take Sheldon's order after he complained to her manager) and then ruins his weekly Saturday laundry night. In response he puts Penny's underwear on the outside telephone wire. After having a heated argument with his mother over his actions he apologizes to Penny and they make amends with one another.

On several occasions Sheldon has implied that Penny is a closer friend to him than Raj and Howard.

On one occasion, when Penny knocks on the door to Apartment 4A in the same manner as Sheldon as a joke, she admitted to Sheldon that it started to "feel good"; Sheldon swiftly advises her not to do it again as she would be "doing it for the rest of her life".

Sheldon has acknowledged that he likes Penny, although claims he was forced to because Leonard "made him", and that Sheldon liking her was a "hard row to hoe", although in "The Intimacy Acceleration" Sheldon has admitted that he considers Penny a sisterly or motherly figure. By the series finale, Penny and Leonard admit to each other that Sheldon was "sort of our practice kid", whereas Sheldon himself calls Penny and Leonard "my two dearest friends in the world" during his Nobel Prize acceptance speech.

==== Family ====
In "The Maternal Capacitance", when first meeting Leonard's mother, Penny reveals that her father Wyatt (Keith Carradine) tried to raise her like a boy, which is a source of pain for her, leading her to have father issues. When she and Leonard begin dating, Wyatt comes to appreciate that she is dating an accomplished academic, rather than an uneducated hick, so much so that when he visits Penny in the fourth-season episode "The Boyfriend Complexity" following her and Leonard's breakup, it is revealed that she has not revealed the breakup to her father. When she later informs Wyatt of the breakup, Wyatt secretly encourages Leonard to not give up on her.

In an early episode, Penny talked to Raj about her sister having shot her brother-in-law. In another episode, Penny accompanied the men to the comic book store to shop for a gift for her 13-year-old nephew. In "The Boyfriend Complexity" (4–9), Wyatt tells Leonard he wants grandchildren one day, "and I want them to grow up on a house without wheels". In "The Dumpling Paradox", Penny has an unwanted guest, Christy, staying with her who had slept with her brother while being engaged to her cousin, saying, "she's kind of family". Christy knows Penny from back in Omaha and, according to Penny, she slept with nearly every man in the city, earning her the nickname "Whore of Omaha". While staying with Penny, Christy sleeps with Howard.

In the fifth-season episode "The Pulled Groin Extrapolation", after Penny quickly grabs and eats the last dumpling of a group dinner after a brief disagreement over who should get it, Sheldon makes the sarcastic comment, "I've seen pictures of your mother. Keep eating", a reference to Penny's mother's weight, that clearly unsettles her. In "The Flaming Spittoon Acquisition", Penny confesses to Bernadette that her mother smoked pot while pregnant with Penny.

Penny has mentioned having a sister who appears to be the mother of her 13-year-old nephew mentioned in season two. In the sixth-season episode "The Parking Spot Escalation" Penny mentions to Bernadette and Amy that her sister gave her her first ever bikini wax using melted Crayolas and duct tape. In "The Bachelor Party Corrosion", Penny tells Bernadette, Amy and viewers that her sister was heavily pregnant at her own wedding, and her water broke at the start of the father-daughter dance.

Penny has mentioned having a brother on parole, who she says is "kind of a chemist". In "The Rhinitis Revelation" (5–6), she is more explicit in revealing that he is in the practice of cooking crystal meth. She mentions that he is back in prison for 12–18 months, depending on his behavior, in the seventh-season finale, "The Status Quo Combustion".

Penny's mother Susan, who Penny has occasionally spoken with on the phone in prior episodes (usually about other family members), first appears in the tenth-season premiere "The Conjugal Conjecture", portrayed by Katey Sagal (who previously played Cuoco's mother in the sitcom 8 Simple Rules). She is shown to be very embarrassed by her family's shortcomings: her son's criminal record and jailing, Wyatt's drinking, and their overall humble existence as a farming family. Although she has previously met Leonard and likes him, she is uncomfortable about meeting his academic parents, not wanting them to think of her family as "white trash". She goes to great lengths to present them in the best possible light, including buying dental implants for her son.

In a 2019 episode, the names of Penny's siblings are said to be Randall and Lisa.

=== Full name ===
Penny's full name is never officially revealed. In 2009, co-creator Bill Prady stated that Penny's last name would be revealed eventually. In 2014, executive producer Steve Molaro stated that her last name would remain a secret. Nevertheless, clues to her full name had already been revealed in Season 2.

In the second-season episode "The Barbarian Sublimation", when she becomes addicted to online gaming, she uses the gamertag "Queen Penelope", though whether Penelope is her actual full first name is never confirmed in the series. In the second-season episode "The Work Song Nanocluster", Penny receives a package addressed to "Penny Teller", an apparent reference to magicians Penn and Teller. The name on the address label is just barely (and fleetingly) visible, and is not referenced in dialogue. The producers of the show approved the name "Penny Teller" for use on the package, mistakenly believing it would not be visible in the finished episode. Similarly, Parsons related that an envelope in an early episode was addressed to "Penny London", the surname of the prop master. Producer Bill Prady maintains that the last name "Teller" is "not canon", however Warner Bros. have referred to her as Penny Teller on social media.

Following her marriage to Leonard, Penny is occasionally referred to or addressed with the last name Hofstadter.

== Reception ==
Tom Jicha of the South Florida Sun-Sentinel praised Cuoco's portrayal of Penny, stating: "Her character had the potential to be a bimbo, but she [Cuoco] has developed it into a fully fleshed-out woman, who isn't as book-smart as the other characters but is wiser in so many ways. She's also a great straight person, who can get off zingers of her own".

== See also ==
- List of The Big Bang Theory characters
- List of The Big Bang Theory episodes
