= Planet Bollywood =

Planet Bollywood may refer to:

- Planet Bollywood (TV series), broadcast by Zoom
- Planet Bollywood aka 2008 NQ17, a fictional planetary object
