= Raj Koothrappali =

Fictional character on the television series The Big Bang Theory

- The Big Bang Theory character
- Kunal Nayyar as Raj Koothrappali
- First appearance: "Pilot"; The Big Bang Theory; September 24, 2007
- Last appearance: "Spoiler: Corn Is Delicious"; Stuart Fails to Save the Universe; August 27, 2026
- Created by: Chuck Lorre; Bill Prady
- Portrayed by: Kunal Nayyar; Rishabh Prabhat (Young Sheldon)

In-universe information
- Full name: Rajesh Ramayan Koothrappali
- Alias: Brown Dynamite
- Nickname: Raj
- Gender: Male
- Title: Doctor
- Occupation: Astrophysicist
- Family: Dr. V. M. Koothrappali (father); Mrs. Koothrappali (mother); Priya Koothrappali (younger sister); Adoot Koothrappali (brother); 2 unnamed brothers unnamed sister Dileep (grandfather); Venkatesh (cousin)
- Religion: Hinduism (nominal)
- Origin: New Delhi, India
- Nationality: Indian

Rajesh Ramayan "Raj" Koothrappali, Ph.D. is a fictional character and one of the protagonists of the CBS television series The Big Bang Theory, portrayed by British-Indian actor Kunal Nayyar. He is one of four main male characters in the show to appear in every episode of The Big Bang Theory, alongside Sheldon Cooper, Leonard Hofstadter and Howard Wolowitz. Raj is based on a computer programmer that the show's co-creator, Bill Prady, knew when he was a programmer.

== Character biography ==
In the series, Raj is Howard's best friend. They have what Nayyar calls a "bromance".

Raj works as an astrophysicist in the Physics Department at Caltech. It was revealed in "The Monster Isolation" that Raj did at least part of his higher education at the University of Cambridge, where he discovered his interest in astrophysics.

He had selective mutism, which did not allow him to talk to women outside of his family unless he was under the influence of alcohol (or medication), until the season 6 finale.

Rajesh, who is normally called Raj or just by his surname Koothrappali, is from New Delhi, India. However, he despises Indian food, and his knowledge about Indian culture and Hinduism is often rebuked by Sheldon, who is seen to speak better Hindi than him (although this is contradicted by earlier episodes, in which Raj is shown speaking Hindi to the incomprehension of his friends, Sheldon included).

In the show, he was born into a wealthy Malayali family and has five siblings, one of whom is Priya, a former on-again, off-again girlfriend of Leonard. Raj is normally seen wearing a layered combination of a printed shirt and sweater vest under a track top-style windbreaker with khakis or cargo pants and skate shoes. White briefs are Raj's underpants of choice. Raj wore a red cap in the pilot episode, but has not worn any headgear on a regular basis for the rest of the series run. Between seasons two and eleven, Raj styled his naturally curly hair with hair straighteners and hair gel "while trying to blend in" (although citing Howard as his main influence).

== Personality ==
In the show, Raj is more patient and tolerant of Sheldon than Leonard, Penny, or Howard. Sheldon is completely oblivious to this and even casually cuts him off as a friend on one occasion to accommodate a friendship with one of their colleagues, Barry Kripke.

Another recurring joke is his metrosexuality, which manifests itself in his appreciation for media generally associated with female patrons, such as the novel Eat, Pray, Love, the TV series Sex and the City and films featuring Sandra Bullock. This has led those close to him to believe that he is somewhat feminine (as in "The Closure Alternative"), and others to mistakenly conclude that he is homosexual (a theory his sister mentioned in "The Herb Garden Germination" that had been held by members of their family), which he typically denies (even asserting his metrosexuality in "The Transporter Malfunction"), but which Howard often teases him over.

In the show, one of Raj's biggest personality quirks is his tendency to speak or act inappropriately, often landing him in trouble or leading to an angry reaction from whomever he has upset. This was particularly pronounced when he was under the influence of alcohol, which could cause a Catch-22, since for years he needed alcohol to even speak to a woman, but the alcohol led to him saying the wrong things. On one occasion, just as Leonard and Penny are about to have intercourse in their hotel room, Raj enters and proceeds to climb into Sheldon's recently vacated bed, completely oblivious of what he has interrupted. On another occasion, he openly discusses having had crushes on Penny and Bernadette directly in front of them, and unwittingly hurting Amy's feelings when he admits that he never had a crush on her after she asks.

When socializing with his friends, despite his Indian accent, Raj is noted for using slang and using the word "dude", although on some occasions he appears to not understand American slang. He speaks fluent Hindi, but according to Sheldon, his mother tongue is English. (English is more common in the state of Kerala from where Raj's parents originate, due to debates and political opposition to the presence of Hindi in South India). When Raj offers to teach Sheldon Hindi in order to give him a challenge, and Sheldon in turn demonstrates his Hindi skills which he learnt at age eight, Raj admits that he never learned Hindi.

Raj can play the guitar and has formed a filk band called "Footprints on the Moon" with Howard (and later Bert). They write songs about various fictional characters, such as "Thor and Doctor Jones", which tells the story of an imaginary encounter between Thor and Indiana Jones.

=== Selective mutism ===
Until the season six finale, Raj's principal characteristic is his inability to speak to or around unrelated women, a form of a medical condition known as selective mutism. In the show, this was alluded to by Dr. Beverly Hofstadter, Leonard's mother. Raj also stated he has selective mutism in the episode "The Cornhusker Vortex". Raj is able to speak in the presence of women only when they are part of a crowd, if he drinks alcoholic beverages (or thinks he has), if he is under influence of other drugs, if he is unaware of their presence, or if the woman is deaf. He observes that this was an improvement over his previous affliction, in which the presence of women caused him to lose bladder control. He had no problem speaking to his mother, sisters, or other female relatives, which led them to dispute his difficulties.

Until the end of the sixth season, Raj remains silent when Penny is present. Penny occasionally taunts him about this, saying such things as "Yo, Raj, talk to me". Raj sometimes whispers what he wants to say to Howard or Leonard, who then repeats his words or responds to his question out loud. However, Howard sometimes uses the situation to amuse himself—for example, when he "confesses" on Raj's behalf that Raj had stalked Penny with binoculars, or when Sheldon calls Penny over to their table to silence Raj; Howard then refuses to act as a mouthpiece and tells Raj, "No no no, he won; Suck it up." In "The Dumpling Paradox", Leonard jokingly suggests cutting Raj in half so the group can play video games without Howard while Penny is in the room: Raj turns to Leonard (facing away from Penny) and responds, "Oh, sure, cut the foreigner in half. There's a billion more where he came from." Later, in "The Bat Jar Conjecture", Raj accidentally utters the words "good story", much to the surprise of his friends, but he immediately realizes Penny is there and covers his mouth with both hands. A recurring gag was for Raj to find himself left alone when his friends, in the company of Penny or another woman, make plans to go somewhere and Raj's mutism prevents him from speaking up to join in.

In "The Grasshopper Experiment", Penny (who is practicing mixing cocktails in order to obtain a bartending shift) inadvertently discovers that Raj's mutism could be suppressed by consuming alcohol: even a tiny amount (such as a bite of rum cake in "The Apology Insufficiency") enables him to have prolonged conversations with women; however, this also tends to make him loud and obnoxious. When the main characters take a train to an academic conference in San Francisco, Raj can talk to series guest Summer Glau (playing herself) while drinking beer, until Leonard inadvertently reveals the beer is non-alcoholic and that Raj is subject to a placebo effect; Howard subsequently uses this to his advantage and Raj reverts to his usual mute self. In some episodes, Raj takes to carrying a hip flask with him to counter his problem, while in other episodes that required him to speak with Penny or other women present, he was usually shown doing so with a beer or wine glass near him to indicate he had consumed alcohol (such as "The Santa Simulation").

Throughout the show, Raj experiments with medications that suppressed social anxiety, but they tend to have side effects. When Sheldon's attractive sister Missy visits, Raj takes medicine that enables him to speak to her, but it results in involuntary repetitive hand motions. In the episode "The Wildebeest Implementation", Raj is worried that an experimental drug he is considering might affect his rationality, but Sheldon encourages him to take it anyway: however, Raj's worries are realized while speaking to a woman in a coffee shop when he completely loses all his inhibitions and takes off all of his clothes.

At the end of the season 6 finale "The Bon Voyage Reaction", Raj's girlfriend Lucy breaks up with him. The subsequent trauma apparently cures his mutism, and he finds he can talk to Penny, Amy, and Bernadette while completely sober. However, he talks so much that the women become bored and irritated and start drinking in order to put up with him. In season 12, after agreeing to enter into an arranged marriage with Anu and her proposal that they sleep together in anticipation, his mutism briefly returns due to pressure: after coming down with a cold, Raj discovers that he can overcome his mutism by taking NyQuil.

== Family ==
In the show, Raj regularly communicates with his parents, Dr. V. M. and Mrs. Koothrappali, back in India via webcam.

A running gag in the series is Raj portraying himself as having come from humble origins and growing up in poverty in India, only for his friends to remind him that his father is a gynaecologist, drives a Bentley (which he protests was a "lease"), and had servants (although he protests on one occasion that there were only four servants, and that two of them were children). In the episode "The Wiggly Finger Catalyst", Sheldon reveals that Raj's family is wealthier than he lets on. He observes that they are "Richie Rich rich", which he explains is "halfway between Bruce Wayne and Scrooge McDuck".

Raj's cousin Sanjay (or, as he says his friends know him, "Dave from AT&T Customer Service") works in a call centre and is mentioned in a number of episodes. In one episode, Raj tries to avoid returning to India for his cousin's wedding, as Raj's parents have arranged a date for him.

Raj has three brothers and two sisters. Raj's sister Priya has a one-night stand with Leonard in Season 4. This leads to a brief argument between Leonard, Raj and Howard for breaking the "pinky swear" that Leonard and Howard made about never trying to make a move on her. Later in the series, Priya and Leonard start a relationship against Raj's wishes, which is awkward as she is living with Raj at the time. In the Season 4 finale, Raj had to move temporarily into Sheldon's apartment after overhearing Leonard using Star Trek references as sexual metaphors to his sister. In the Season 11 episode 23 "The Sibling Realignment", He mentions his brother Adoot to Sheldon and Leonard. Adoot was always mean to him, when they were children, he left the front door open causing Raj's pet mongoose to run away.

Also, in the season 3 episode "The Precious Fragmentation", Raj tries to negotiate the possession of the One Ring with the help of his cousin Venkatesh Koothrappali, who is an attorney (but agrees with Raj that he is useless in that role).

In the season 7 episode "The Table Polarization", Raj talks about naming his first child Dileep after his grandfather.

== Work ==
During the show, Raj is an astrophysicist in the Physics Department at Caltech, best known for a publication on Kuiper belt object size distribution.

For his discovery of a planetary object beyond the Kuiper belt, 2008 NQ_{17}, which he named "Planet Bollywood", Raj was included in People magazine's "30 (Visionaries) Under 30 (Years of Age) to Watch", received a larger office, and became a celebrity of sorts, drawing the envy of his friends.

In the show, after six months of failed research on the composition of trans-Neptunian objects, Raj feared being deported back to India (at which point, he describes spending his time at work as "mostly checking e-mail, updating his Facebook status, and messing up Wikipedia entries"). To stay in the country, he sought out a research position in stellar evolution with Professor Laughlin, failing as the research team included an attractive woman, and Raj, who became drunk so he could talk to her, made an inappropriate comment; in retaliation, Raj filed a complaint against Laughlin, claiming the British professor discriminated against him. Raj ended up working alongside Sheldon (or "for" him, as Sheldon insists), "exploring the string theory implications of gamma rays from dark matter annihilations". Ironically, he noted that he once wanted to be the "Indira Gandhi of particle astrophysics (but with a penis, of course)". During season 6, Raj has developed a talent to be a party planner that was demonstrated at the time of Howard and Bernadette's wedding, and the Halloween, and Valentine's Day parties, at the comic book store. Raj stated that his career in astrophysics and a possible career in party planning was "always a coin flip".

In the season 11 episode "The Comet Polarization", he sets up a telescope on the roof of Leonard and Sheldon's apartment building. Penny looks through the telescope and sees something interesting and takes a picture. Raj later verifies that the object is a new comet and claims sole discovery for it, angering Penny who thinks she should be named as co-discoverer. This causes friction between them as Raj knows that including Penny (who is not a scientist) will be detrimental to his career. After being confronted by Penny, Raj finally relents on giving her credit for the discovery.

== Relationships ==
For most of the series, Raj had not been involved in any lasting romantic relationship, mostly due to his inability to speak to women. However, he was much more successful in casual relationships than the more sexually forward Howard. He once dated Lalita Gupta, a childhood friend, in an arrangement made by his parents. With Raj able to speak to her only under the influence of alcohol, the date goes badly, and Lalita left the intoxicated and bothersome Raj to have dinner with Sheldon.

After Raj behaves boorishly with Penny while at a People magazine reception, and presents Penny to his parents (via webcam) as his girlfriend, he later apologizes, first with a written note. When Penny forces him to do so verbally, he utters a barely audible "sorry".

Raj also seeks to date Sheldon's attractive twin sister, Missy. To do so, he takes an experimental drug to correct his anxiety disorder. He is the only one, out of himself, Howard and Leonard, in whom Missy showed any interest, but the medication wears off when he tries to ask her out.

When Sheldon, Leonard, Howard, and Raj are on a train to San Francisco, the latter three tried talking to actress Summer Glau, who they see is in their train car. After drinking what he thinks is a beer, Raj is able to charm Glau. When a jealous Howard points out to Raj that his beer is non-alcoholic, Raj stops speaking in the middle of his conversation, and flees from Glau.

At one point in the show, Raj reveals that he once had a girlfriend, after Leonard claims that the two of them were the only ones without them. He states that she was deaf, so his inability to speak with women was not an issue. Raj has an infatuation with Howard's girlfriend, Bernadette, and is visibly unhappy when she accepts Howard's marriage proposal. This antagonizes Howard when he learns of it, although Raj attempted to reassure him that it was no longer an issue, believing that he and Penny were together and in love after a drunken one-night stand.

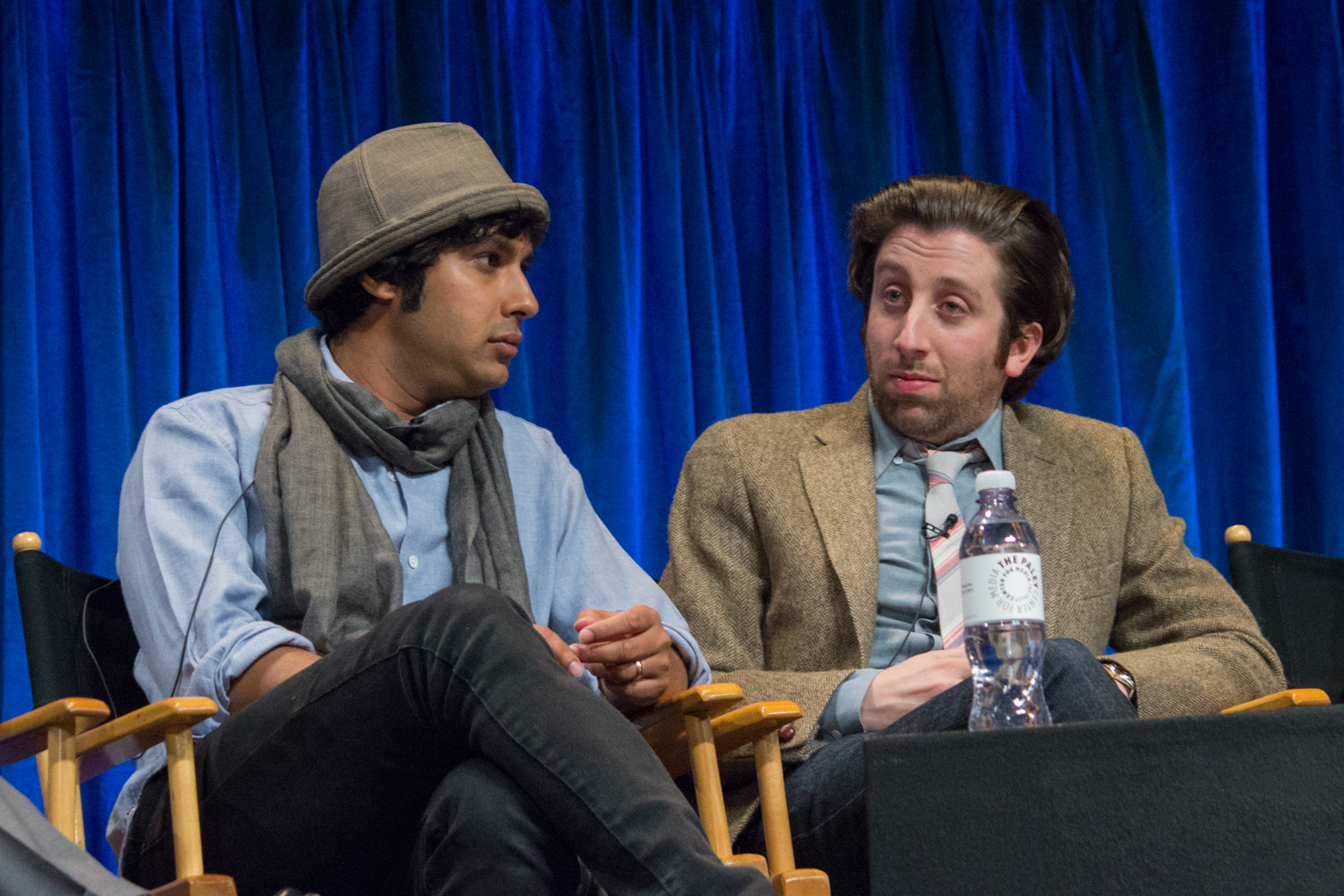
Kunal Nayyar and Simon Helberg, the actors who play Raj and Howard Wolowitz, at PaleyFest

Despite both being heterosexual in the show, Raj and Howard tend to appear as if they are in a homosexual relationship. This is described by Leonard's mother, Dr. Beverly Hofstadter, as an "ersatz homosexual marriage". Even Raj's parents are aware of this, as Raj's mother once notes "the closest thing we have to a daughter-in-law is that Jewish boy Howard!" Raj often takes up the stereotypically "female" role in arguments with Howard, once expressing his displeasure at Howard constantly ditching him to chase women. Raj recounts a dream where he and Howard both had mansions with a secret tunnel that connected Howard's "front yard" to his "back yard". He uses a female avatar in World of Warcraft. In season four he claims to be a metrosexual, and in season 8 it is revealed that he and Howard were once in couples therapy. In season 10's "The Emotion Detection Automaton", Howard tells Raj that if they are both unattached in the next thirty years, he would be open to the two of them having a relationship; Raj opens up to the idea after learning that Stuart Bloom would be able to get together with Bernadette.

In the season 4 finale, Penny and Raj become intoxicated and, despite agreeing to remain good friends, end up in bed together, giving the impression that they had had intercourse. The next morning, both agree to pretend it never happened, but they are caught by Leonard, Sheldon, and Howard as they try to leave, causing Penny to consider moving back to Nebraska. In the opening episode of season 5, Raj claims to Leonard, Howard and Sheldon that he and Penny are in love, but later reveals to Penny that they did not have intercourse; instead, he ejaculated prematurely and they fell asleep. Penny promised not to tell the guys, although subsequently she at one time calls him "Quick Draw" after he insists in maintaining that they slept together.

In season 5, Raj buys a new iPhone and quickly develops feelings for the computerized personal assistant, Siri. Later in season 5, Penny believes she has found the perfect match for Raj by having him meet a woman who is deaf; however, it turns out she only dated Raj for his money and leaves him when he tells her that his parents will cut off financial ties with him if they continue to see each other. Finally, in despair, Raj asks his parents to find him a potential bride for an arranged marriage. Raj gets along well with his parents' first selection, but discovers that the woman is a lesbian trying to conceal her sexual orientation from her family: she assumes Raj is also homosexual and that they would have a lavender marriage, an idea Raj considers as a viable alternative to lifelong bachelorhood until Howard and Bernadette convince him otherwise. Out of their concern for his loneliness, Howard and Bernadette give him a pet dog. Happy with his new companion, a female Yorkshire Terrier he names Cinnamon, Raj proceeds to see if the pup fits in his man-purse. This leads Bernadette to dispute Raj's heterosexuality. In the episode "The Thespian Catalyst", Raj fantasizes various scenarios in which Howard dies or is rendered an invalid, and Raj must satisfy Bernadette's sexual needs. This culminates in a dream sequence where he and Bernadette dance together in a Bollywood musical number. He reflects upon these fantasies by observing that he is "definitely not gay".

At Howard's bachelor party, Raj mentions that he and Howard had a threesome at Comic-Con with an overweight woman in a Sailor Moon costume, one of many past escapades which make Bernadette doubt whether to marry Howard.

In the season six episode "The Tangible Affection Proof", Raj and Stuart put together a party at the store for lonely single people on Valentine's Day. After giving a speech about how one cannot define themself by being in a relationship, he is approached by a woman named Lucy (Kate Micucci). They both leave to get a cup of coffee, with Raj hypocritically declaring "Later, losers!" In "The Monster Isolation", Lucy flees during their coffee date, sending Raj into depression and self-isolation in his apartment wearing nothing but briefs and Uggs. Lucy gives Howard her phone number to give to Raj. Later, Lucy goes to his apartment to apologize and tells him that she has problems around new people. Raj describes his own psychological problems, and they agree to have a formal date.

In the following episode, "The Contractual Obligation Implementation", he takes Lucy out for a first date to a library where they text message each other instead of speaking, in light of her social anxiety and his selective mutism. They continue to date and by "The Love Spell Potential" they kiss. However, in the season 6 finale, "The Bon Voyage Reaction", Lucy feels too pressured by Raj to meet his friends, and a dinner between Lucy, Raj, and Amy does not go well. Raj apologizes for his behavior and asks Lucy to come to Leonard's goodbye party before his departure for the North Sea on Professor Stephen Hawking's expedition. However, Lucy texts him at the party, saying she will not be there and does not want to see him again. The next day, Penny goes to comfort a heartbroken Raj, who thinks he is completely unlovable. Penny suggests that this lament is attributed to alcohol, but Raj says that he has not had a drink since the night before: they learn that he is finally cured of his selective mutism.

In season 7, Raj's newfound ability to speak to women allows him to put aside his previous difficulties with them, and though he does not date, he manages to charm several women throughout the series, including the divorced HR representative Mrs. Davis, and a veterinarian named Yvette. Eventually, he begins dating Emily Sweeney (Laura Spencer), an attractive but rather sinister young dermatologist he met on the Internet. Their initial interaction does not go well, when she finds Raj's shyness and passivity off-putting, having asked Amy to write his messages to her, but she eventually agrees to go on a date with him: it goes well and the two begin dating properly for the rest of the season, becoming exclusive in the final two episodes. In "The Valentino Submergence", episode 15 of season 9, Raj breaks up with Emily right before Valentine's Day, because he has developed an interest in Claire, a bartender working on a sci-fi screenplay for a children's film whom he met in the previous episode. Upon learning that Claire has reunited with her former boyfriend, he begs Emily to take him back, but she refuses. He briefly dates both women at once, with Raj's constant bragging of the fact irritating Howard.

During season 12, Raj asks his now-divorced father to arrange another marriage for him: he ends up seeing an ambitious hotel concierge named Anu (Rati Gupta) whose cavalier and impersonal attitude to marriage leaves him briefly disheartened, but after she proposes to him while on one knee, he accepts. In "The Consummation Deviation", their attempts to be physical together bring about a brief relapse of Raj's mutism. In "The Paintball Scattering", Raj accidentally spies on Anu, and they both conclude that they know very little about each other and they cancel the wedding. Afterwards, they agree to restart their dating relationship. However, near the end of the season, Anu accepts a job offer in London and asks Raj if he is prepared to move to England to live with her. Though initially hesitant, Raj decides to move, but at the last second, Howard intercepts Raj at the airport and convinces him to stay in Los Angeles, telling him that he will someday find and genuinely fall in love with a better match for him. Raj subsequently stays with his friends in America, presumably ending his relationship with Anu. In the last episode he is seen holding hands with Sarah Michelle Gellar but she asks him to stop, insisting that they are not on a date.

In the spin-off Stuart Fails to Save the Universe, Raj appears in a dystopian alternative universe where he was married before the fall of civilization. He was kept prisoner by a now-dictator Barry Kripke, who murdered him as he was about to repair the device that caused the multiverse to fracture.

== Creation and casting ==
Raj did not appear in the original, unaired series pilot, which only featured Leonard, Sheldon, and a different version of the Penny character, called Katie. The test audiences reacted negatively to Katie, but they liked Sheldon and Leonard. In the new pilot, Raj and Howard were added. Series co-creator Bill Prady stated: "The idea was, if they like these first two guys, let's give them two more".

Raj's social anxiety around women in the show was inspired by a former co-worker of Prady. Originally the character was called "Dave", and was an American born to Indian parents. This was changed when Nayyar won the role: he is an English-born Indian, born in London to Indian immigrants who moved back to New Delhi when Nayyar was 4 years old. When doing scenes in which Raj must consume alcohol in order to speak, Nayyar would drink non-alcoholic substitutes. When scenes called for Raj to drink grasshoppers, the substitute was a concoction of water, cream and a heavy amount of green food coloring.

== See also ==
- List of The Big Bang Theory characters
- List of The Big Bang Theory episodes
