= Howard Wolowitz =

Fictional character on the television series The Big Bang Theory

- The Big Bang Theory character
- Simon Helberg as Howard Wolowitz
- First appearance: "Pilot"; The Big Bang Theory; September 24, 2007
- Last appearance: "An Introduction to Engineering and a Glob of Hair Gel"; Young Sheldon; November 18, 2021
- Created by: Chuck Lorre; Bill Prady
- Portrayed by: Simon Helberg; Ethan Reed Stern (Young Sheldon)

In-universe information
- Full name: Howard Joel Wolowitz
- Nicknames: Froot Loops (as an astronaut); Rocket Man (by Raj); Wolowizard (online gaming name); Sir Howard of Wolowitz (online gaming name); Howie (by Bernadette); Clogzilla (by Emily and Emily’s Friends); Bubbula (by Mrs. Wolowitz); Tushy face (by Mrs. Wolowitz); The Great Howdini (in magic show); F. Loops (drawn on his face with marker by Michael Massimino of NASA)
- Gender: Male
- Occupation: Aerospace engineer Astronaut (formerly)
- Family: Sam Wolowitz (father, abandoned); Debbie Wolowitz (mother, deceased); Josh Wolowitz (paternal half-brother); Marty Wolowitz (cousin)
- Spouse: Bernadette Rostenkowski (m. 2012)
- Children: Halley Wolowitz (daughter); Neil Michael Wolowitz (son)
- Relatives: Gladys (aunt); Mike Rostenkowski (father-in-law); Mrs. Rostenkowski (mother-in-law); Joey Rostenkowski (brother-in-law); 4 other siblings-in-law
- Religion: Judaism
- Nationality: American

Howard Joel Wolowitz, M.Eng. is a fictional character and one of the protagonists on the CBS television series The Big Bang Theory (2007–2019) created by Chuck Lorre and Bill Prady and portrayed by actor Simon Helberg. Among the four main male characters in the show, Howard is distinctive for being an engineer—rather than a physicist—and lacking a PhD. He is named after and based on a computer programmer known by the show's co-creator, Bill Prady. Howard is the only starring character who has been to the International Space Station. Along with Sheldon Cooper, Leonard Hofstadter, and Raj Koothrappali, Howard is part of the central cast of the show and appears in every episode.

== Biography ==
In the universe of The Big Bang Theory, Howard is an aerospace engineer at Caltech's Department of Applied Physics and an ex-astronaut for NASA who, in the show, is often seen at the apartment of Leonard Hofstadter (Johnny Galecki) and Sheldon Cooper (Jim Parsons). He was born in 1981, as specified in the season one episode, "The Pancake Batter Anomaly", and is a native of Pasadena (although his mother has an East Coast accent). Howard received his degree in engineering from the Massachusetts Institute of Technology.

Howard is fond of (and collects) decorator belt buckles, though he jokingly claims to own only one belt; his collection includes a NES controller, a silver Batman logo, a 45 RPM record insert, a Klingon communicator, and a buckle featuring the superhero the Flash. He also typically wears a turtleneck or dickey with an Alienware lapel pin on the collar.

== Personality ==
He lived with his mother for several seasons before eventually moving in with his wife Bernadette Rostenkowski. Until he returned from space in season six, his personal transportation was a Vespa motor scooter, which he eventually traded for a Mini Countryman.

Howard is a polyglot. Besides English, Howard can speak nine languages including French, Mandarin, Russian, Arabic, Latin, Persian, Japanese, American Sign Language, and the constructed language Klingon from the Star Trek franchise. He also knows some words in Sindarin, one of the elvish dialects invented by J.R.R. Tolkien for The Lord of the Rings. The episode "The Hawking Excitation" reveals that he also understands the computer language Binary ASCII. As in "The Love Spell Potential" (Season 6, ep 23), Howard frequently does impersonations of Nicolas Cage, and is capable of impersonating Al Pacino and Christopher Walken.

Until his marriage, Howard fancied himself as a "ladies' man" and he provided outrageous and often sexist pick-up lines whenever there was a woman present, resulting in humiliating rejections. Howard describes himself as a romantic, although he usually comes across as overtly sexual, and in the words of Penny, disgusting. However, Penny's dislike of Howard mellowed since Howard started dating Penny's colleague Bernadette, whom he later married. When Howard found an ALF doll and revealed that it filled a void for him when his father left, Penny felt sympathy for him and began to empathize more when she understood his behavior a little bit better.

Like the rest of the group, Howard dislikes many of Sheldon's antics. He has grown accustomed to them, but he is the quickest to get frustrated with Sheldon. Once, Penny asked how Sheldon had ever gotten any friends, and Howard simply replied, 'We liked Leonard.'

Howard is allergic to nuts, particularly peanuts and pistachios; they can induce a life-threatening anaphylactic reaction in him, which has the side effect of disfiguring his face horribly. He once deliberately caused this reaction by eating a granola bar to keep Leonard busy at the hospital when they were planning a surprise birthday party for him, which was motivated by Penny's promise to introduce him to her "easy" friends, as shown in "The Peanut Reaction" (Season 1, Episode 16). Another time, when he was depressed about Leslie Winkle dumping him in season 2, and while he was in Las Vegas with Raj and Leonard, he tweeted that he was considering suicide by consuming a can of peanuts due to loneliness and not having his desires met. He has also mentioned having transient idiopathic arrhythmia. Howard is proud of having only three percent body fat, which Raj declares makes him look like a human chicken wing.

Although Jewish, Howard is not very serious about his religion and does not keep kosher. For instance, he eats pork, and when the price of pork went up at the group's favorite Chinese restaurant, he remarked "It's getting tougher and tougher to be a bad Jew". On another occasion, when Howard tried to date Sheldon's sister, Missy, he said he would kill his rabbi with a pork chop if his religion was an impediment, and one of the reasons he was happy to continue dating Bernadette (who is a Polish Catholic) was that it gave him the chance to annoy his mother. Despite this, Howard has shown some belief in his faith. When he and Raj posed as goths to pick up women, he wore fake-tattoo sleeves and refused to get real ones (although he attempted to get one but was too scared of the needle). It is noted in "The Bath Item Gift Hypothesis" that he observes Hanukkah. He also apparently attends High Holy Day services, as Sheldon once critically commented that he was not available to compete in Halo during those times. However, in "The Financial Permeability" he made the sign of the cross—a Catholic practice—during an encounter with Kurt, Penny's former boyfriend.

In the episode "The Herb Garden Germination", he became engaged to Bernadette when she accepted his marriage proposal. They eventually married in the season 5 finale, "The Countdown Reflection", which featured a small reception. They had planned to have a bigger, "official" reception after Howard returned from space (although this was not featured).

Like most of the characters in the series, Howard is musically inclined and plays the piano well. He has used this talent to romantically impress Bernadette a number of times. He has also formed a filk band with Raj (and later Bert) named "Footprints on the Moon" and has written songs about popular heroes such as Thor and Indiana Jones.

== Work ==
Unlike Leonard, Sheldon, and Raj, Howard lacks a Ph.D. He has a Master's degree from MIT (he first studied in medical school but dropped out since he was terrified of blood). This often leads to mocking and derision from Sheldon, Amy and the Head of Department, Dr. Gablehauser, who usually refers to him as "mister" while referring to his friends as doctors. Additionally, Sheldon often says that he is the least smart of the four "nerd" characters, as shown in "The Bus Pants Utilization", where the guys develop an iPhone app and Sheldon refers to them as "three geniuses and their friend Howard". Howard defends himself, however, by pointing out that as an aerospace engineer, his work has actual real-world application, whereas his friends' work is largely theoretical. Howard has also been considered for a top-secret government project, a polar exploration mission, and a position on the International Space Station.

Howard is usually seen working on equipment to be used in NASA missions and the International Space Station, though many times he is careless about it, and has "access" to high-tech surveillance and NASA gear. In the first episode, Howard mentioned working on the design of a satellite that orbits a moon of Jupiter taking high-resolution photos.

Having worked on the Mars rover project, he invited his date, Stephanie Barnett, to drive it at a secret facility. Instead, the rover became stuck in a Martian ditch and he spent the rest of the night with Sheldon and Raj trying to undo the damage and get the rover out of the ditch. When this proved unsuccessful, he decided to erase the hard drives of the facility and destroy all the files connected to his treachery to cover up his meddling, only to later find out that the rover had discovered the first clear signs of life on Mars.

The rover incident was kept a close secret, until the season 4 episode "The Apology Insufficiency", when he made it onto a new team for the Defense Department's laser-equipped surveillance satellite but was not granted a security clearance and was taken out of the team after Sheldon revealed the rover incident to an investigating FBI agent.

On another occasion, Howard worked on a "zero-gravity human-waste disposal system" (essentially a space toilet), that was deployed in the International Space Station. He later realized the equipment had a structural weakness (the toilet would backfire after 10 flushes) and again sought the help of his friends to correct it. The solution proved unsuccessful and an incident on the station ensued (Raj referred to this as the "zero-gravity human-waste distribution system"). The end of the episode showed the ISS astronauts leaving the station for an "unscheduled" space walk. This leads to Sheldon describing his work as being a "space plumber".

Howard likely has the most hands-on and mechanical aptitude of the four: being the engineer among his physicist friends, he assumes the role of leader for small hands-on projects. He was the primary force behind "M.O.N.T.E"., a killer robot designed to enter a robot fighting competition. The robot was destroyed by Barry Kripke's own robot, the "Kripke Krippler", in an unofficial match before the start of the competition.

In the season 4 premiere, Howard developed a robotic arm for the International Space Station. Realizing how much it felt like an actual arm, he used the arm for masturbation, only to get the arm stuck on his penis. He called Leonard and Raj, but neither was willing to get too "hands-on" and help free him from the arm's grip. He was afraid to use the computer controlling the arm as it thought it was holding a screwdriver and would start twisting if he restarted the program. Eventually, Leonard and Raj took Howard to the hospital, where the attending nurse went against Howard's fears and turned off the computer, freeing Howard. The episode's tag scene implied that Howard tried to use the arm to pleasure himself again and ended up in the same predicament.

Howard visited the International Space Station as a Payload Specialist on Expedition 31. He has the unwanted astronaut nickname "Froot Loops" (he had wanted the nickname "Rocket Man" and to that end installed the ringtone for Elton John's song "Rocket Man", but astronaut Mike Massimino overheard Howard's mother telling Howard that his Froot Loops were getting soggy during a NASA Skype conversation and pinned that nickname on him). At first, NASA cancelled his flight, to Howard's great relief, but then the mission was moved up, causing Howard and Bernadette to move up their wedding. A very nervous Howard is launched into space. His sixth-season experience is not great since his fellow astronauts play tricks on him and he starts to experience panic attacks. Upon his return to Earth, he gets an underwhelming response from his friends, and his only consolation is a free slice of cheesecake at a restaurant. He spends the remainder of the season boasting about his trip, to the irritation of everyone. Sheldon eventually sets him straight by denying being envious of him going to space, since "monkeys went to space"; by season 12, Bernadette has, with Stuart's help, written a children's book called The Frightened Little Astronaut based on Howard's experiences in space, much to his chagrin.

In Season 10, Howard along with Leonard and Sheldon are recruited by the US Air Force to develop a Quantum Guidance System which is based on the Superfluid Vacuum theory Leonard and Sheldon published earlier during Season 8. Although not without complications or delays, the three were able to complete their prototype only for the US Air Force to confiscate their project for further development.

Howard and Amy collaborated on her neuroprosthetics project in Season 11.

In Season 11 (2017), Howard, Leonard, and Raj find out that they mined Bitcoin in 2010, seven years ago. With the increase in the cost of Bitcoin, Howard hopes this money will allow him to buy things and leave work at the university. However, after Stuart finds Leonard's Batman thumb drive containing the Bitcoin and erases the thumb drive in 2013, Howard and the gang have no money left.

== Family ==
Until his marriage, Howard was noted for still living with his overbearing mother (Debbie/Mrs Wolowitz), who is selectively oblivious to his accomplishments as an adult and usually treats him like he is still a child, filling the cliché of a Jewish mother. Once, Leonard stated that Howard "was in a pretty serious relationship – with his mom". Howard is the only member of the original group to be an only child. Howard's wife is Bernadette Rostenkowski-Wolowitz.

Mrs. Wolowitz (voiced by Carol Ann Susi) is not shown on screen until season 5, the final episode "The Countdown Reflection" and later in season 6 episode "The Spoiler Alert Segmentation". But her voice is heard when he is at their house or when he talks to her on the phone. She only communicates with Howard by yelling at him in an obnoxious manner, which results in awkward long-distance conversations, with Howard yelling back at her in a frustrated manner. Her nosy nature and her barrage of questions make Howard's life tense at home, which prompts him to call her a "crazy old lady". It is revealed in "The Cohabitation Formulation", however, when Howard briefly moves in with Bernadette, that he is accustomed to being "mothered" to some extent. In "The Apology Insufficiency", Sheldon observes that Howard seems to have "an unresolved Oedipus complex". Following the death of Carol Ann Susi, it was decided Mrs. Wolowitz would die in the season 8 episode "The Comic Book Store Regeneration". Howard receives a phone call while in the comic book store from his aunt Gladys in Florida, whom Mrs. Wolowitz had gone to visit. She says that she laid down for a nap and never woke up.

In "The Precious Fragmentation", Howard reveals that his father left his family when Howard was eleven years old. His mother bought him an ALF doll to help Howard try to get over it. When Howard finds a similar doll at a garage sale, he starts talking to it as if he were eleven again, asking him to find his father and bring him home. This causes Penny (who usually avoids Howard and is disgusted by him) to be pitiful and (reluctantly) sympathetic. In "The Shiny Trinket Maneuver", it is mentioned that the birthday party where he did his magic show was his cousin's party but it is unknown who his cousin was in the group of children that were present. In "The Closet Reconfiguration", Howard gets a letter from his father which is the first contact that he gets from his father in the series. Rick Moranis and Martin Short were considered to portray Howard's father, but the producers wanted Ringo Starr for the role. Starr's team declined and it was decided not to have him appear physically in the show.

In "The Fortification Implementation", it is revealed that his father's first name is Sam, and that he fathered another child, Josh (Matt Bennett), who is Howard's half-brother. While at first upset at the notion that his father went on to have another family, Howard bonds with Josh when the latter shows admiration for his journey to space and possesses a lecherous nature similar to his original one.

During season 9 it is revealed that Howard and Bernadette are expecting a baby. Their daughter, Halley, was born on Amy Farrah Fowler's birthday (season 10, episode "The Birthday Synchronicity") in December. As of season 11, they are expecting another baby, this time a son, to whom Howard is desperately nervous about bonding: in "The Neonatal Nomenclature", their son is born, and after a lot of dispute (initially due to Bernadette picking a name before he was born), is named Neil (for Armstrong, Gaiman, and Diamond) Michael (after Bernadette's father).

== Relationships ==
In the early seasons, Howard was consistently depicted as the most perverted of the guys. For example, he develops a mathematical formula for the likelihood of his having relations by applying and modifying the Drake equation to include the "Wolowitz coefficient", which he defines as "neediness times dress size squared". When questioned if he is serious, he states, "I'm a horny engineer...I never joke about math or sex".

Howard's techniques in approaching women are varied, including magic and card tricks.

Along with Leonard and Raj, Howard also attempts to woo Missy, Sheldon's twin sister. His offer is not accepted, although it was clear she was waiting for Raj. Katee Sackhoff appears as herself in "The Vengeance Formulation", where she is fantasized as Howard's dream girl. She appears again in season 4, in the same role.

In the beginning of the series, Howard shows an interest in Penny, but the interest is primarily sexual and she always rejects him. After yet another approach by Howard, Penny finally confronts him about the way he treats women, giving a brutal assessment of him from the woman's point of view. This greatly affects Howard and he falls into a depression, missing work and staying home. When Penny apologizes, Howard tells her about his past relationships and Penny shows some sympathy for him; after her comforting words, Howard tries to kiss her, but she reacts by breaking his nose. With the situation resolved, Penny believes they have come to an "understanding", but Howard instead thinks he was merely "half-way to pity sex" with her.

In the first season, he forms a sexual relationship with Christy, a friend of Penny's from Omaha but it quickly becomes apparent that Christy is materialistic and using Howard, ultimately resulting in her leaving after getting into an argument with Howard's mother. During the second season, he goes on a date with Stephanie Barnett but fails to form a relationship with her as she chooses to date Leonard instead. While they did fall out, they quickly made up when Stephanie promised to introduce Howard to an attractive friend.

Howard later engages in a "friends with benefits" relationship with Leslie Winkle, which brings him a few benefits besides sex. However, he still becomes depressed when Leslie leaves him sometime later. In order to cheer him up, Leonard and Raj take Howard to Las Vegas and manage to hire a prostitute for him.

When the guys travel by train to a symposium in San Francisco, Howard gets a chance to talk to Summer Glau (portraying herself). His clumsy attempts at impressing the actress fail, despite he being in a confined environment with her for several hours.

During a camping trip with Leonard and Raj, in which they all get stoned by eating cookies laced with a drug (likely marijuana), Howard reveals he lost his virginity to his second cousin Jeanie after his uncle's funeral. This fact prompts incessant teasing from Leonard and Raj. In "The Prom Equivalency", Stuart brings Jeanie as a date causing Howard to fight with him on the car ride there.

Despite Howard being undeniably obsessed with women, some believe him to be in a romantic relationship with Raj. The belief is proposed by Dr. Beverly Hofstadter, Leonard's mother, who believes them to be in an "ersatz homosexual marriage". Both Howard's and Raj's parents are aware of this; when Howard asks his mother if Bernadette can stay over, she clearly states she cannot say no when Bernadette is "willing to give the milk away for free". She concludes her statement by saying "Frankly, after all your sleepovers with the little brown boy, a girl is a big relief", while Raj's mother stated "the closest thing we have to a daughter-in-law is that Jewish boy Howard!" Raj and Howard have several arguments during the series, in which Raj repeatedly accuses Howard of leaving him for everyone who is only slightly better-looking, makes it appear that Raj assumes the cliché female role in partnership arguments; Howard frequently mocks him for such responses. However, Raj and Howard's relationship is mostly close: the duo reconcile almost immediately after going through tiffs. Raj often whispers comments to Howard when Penny is in the room, which allows him an avenue of communication, given Raj's chronic inability to speak to women (although he was cured from it at the end of the sixth season). In season 10's "The Emotion Detection Automaton", Howard tells Raj that if they are both unattached in the next thirty years, he would be open to the two of them having a relationship.

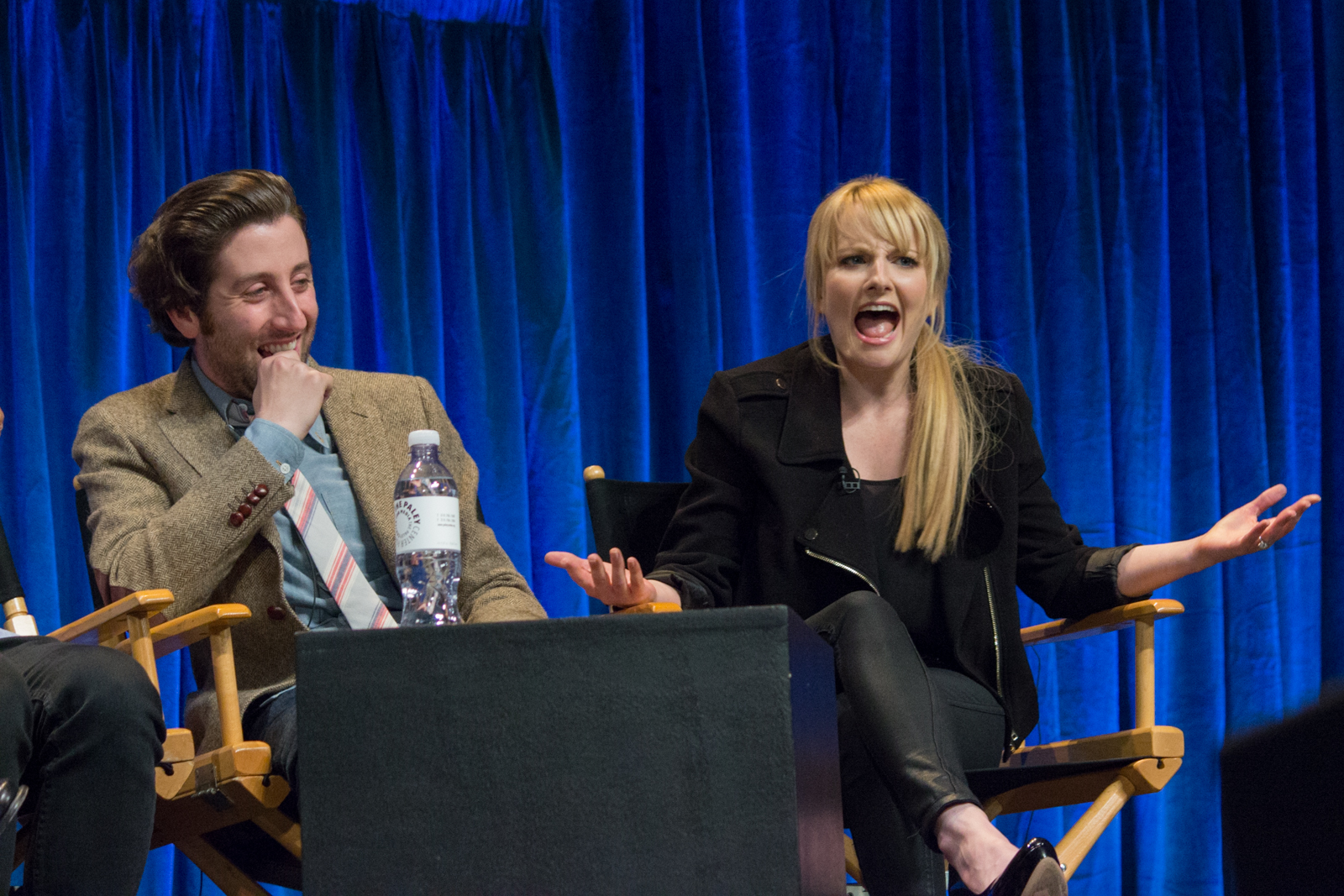
Simon Helberg and Melissa Rauch, the actress who portrays Bernadette Rostenkowski, at PaleyFest 2013

In the middle of the third season, Howard is introduced to Bernadette Rostenkowski (Melissa Rauch) by Penny. A waitress paying her way through graduate school for microbiology studies. At first, she and Howard do not get along, as they appear to have nothing in common. However, when they find out they both have overbearing mothers they immediately feel a connection. They are particularly pleased that it could enrage both Howard's Jewish mother and Bernadette's Catholic mother to find out their kids are dating. They also note that they lost their virginity in Toyota-made vehicles. Subsequently, Howard realizes Bernadette represents a real opportunity to develop a lasting relationship and, in an impulsive manner, he proposes to her. Although Bernadette rejects his offer, they remain a couple for some time.

There is often a running gag between Leonard and Howard mocking Raj for still being single. In "The Plimpton Stimulation", Howard briefly mentions that he and Bernadette broke up a couple of weeks earlier, but did not mention it since he "was waiting for the right time". It is later revealed that the relationship ended because Bernadette caught Howard engaging in cybersex with "Glacinda the Troll" on World of Warcraft, who is later revealed to be played by a male employee of the university (Steve Patterson, "The greasy old fat guy in Facilities Management"). By the end of the episode, the two discuss their problems and restart their relationship from the beginning. This marks a fundamental shift in Howard's character, as he stops pursuing random women and focuses solely on his new relationship.

Season 4 introduces Howard's "latent homosexual tendencies" when George Takei appears as himself in an imaginary conversation with Bernadette and Katee Sackhoff over his relationship status with Bernadette and his erotic fantasies with fictional characters, which is a reminder of what Leonard's mother earlier says about the "ersatz homosexual marriage".

In "The Herb Garden Germination", Howard once again proposes to Bernadette, this time in front of his friends. To the horrific dismay of Raj, who had developed feelings for Bernadette, she accepts. During their engagement, Bernadette is awarded her doctorate degree and reveals that she has gotten a job at a pharmaceutical company which promises a "buttload of money". Although he claims to have supported her new career, Howard's friends mock him for not having a doctorate, with Penny calling the others doctors then remarking that Howard knows a lot of doctors. The situation reaches its breaking point when he and Bernadette have an argument after she buys him a Rolex, which he interprets as a sign that she will be the main breadwinner; more recently, he appears to be more accepting of that situation, since (after falling out over the idea of starting a family) they have discussed that if they have children, he will probably become a stay-at-home dad while she continues to work (a possibility they revisit in season 11 prior to and immediately after the birth of their son). The souring of relations grows worse when he learns that in addition to almost having sex with Penny, Raj was writing love poems and fantasizing about Bernadette and him, which leads to Howard distrusting Bernadette and believing that she may cheat on him with Raj.

At his bachelor party, an inebriated Raj describes Howard losing his virginity to his second cousin, his Las Vegas prostitute experience, and their threesome with an overweight Sailor Moon cosplayer at Comic-Con. Wil Wheaton films the whole speech and posts it online. Bernadette picks them up and is furious after seeing the video and is wondering how she can marry a man that she doesn't seem to know, though she does forgive him after he gives an enrapturing apology for Penny to transfer, which sends her into tears. Bernadette later tells Howard that she wants to be married to him before he is launched into space. After an aborted attempt to be married at city hall before it closed, they agree to be married on the roof of the apartment building. Bernadette is escorted down the aisle by her father and is married by Raj, Leonard, Penny, Sheldon and Amy who all became ministers for the occasion. The ceremony is photographed by an orbiting satellite for the Google Earth website.

In season 6, the newlyweds do have some bumps including Howard readjusting to being back on earth, moving out of his mother's house, and spending too much on his collectibles hobby, but they continued to grow a steady relationship together, until season 7's "The Discovery Dissipation", when Raj briefly moves in with them. During this time, Raj's kindness and helpful nature inadvertently reveal that Howard and Bernadette's relationship has deteriorated to the extent that they no longer pay attention to each other, but they insist that they are content with merely "half-assing" their way through their marriage. However, during season 9, when the two were expecting their first baby, they appeared to have repaired their relationship till Howard started being worried about his parenting capacity.

In season 7, Howard and Bernadette have a double date with Raj and his girlfriend Emily (Laura Spencer). Howard instantly recognizes her and it is revealed that he and Emily previously went on a blind date. Due to an upset stomach caused by gas station sushi, Howard used and subsequently clogged Emily's toilet. Because the toilet overflowed all over Emily's bathroom floor and Howard was unsuccessful in cleaning it up, he was extremely embarrassed and climbed out the bathroom window. Howard apologized to Emily, to which she responds that it's okay and she and her friends refer to him as "Clogzilla".

Amy Farrah Fowler is shown to be one of the few women that Howard has had a platonic relationship with. Prior to the events "The Scavenger Vortex", Howard and Amy are said to have little one-on-one interaction with each other, partly because Penny warned her about Howard's previously perverted nature. During the episode, Howard and Amy are randomly paired-up to take part in a scavenger hunt organized by Raj, much to the former's relief due to Bernadette's competitiveness, and subsequently bond over their mutual love of Neil Diamond's music, even agreeing to attend one of his concerts together and performing his songs at the Cheesecake Factory. However, in "The Fermentation Bifurcation", when they both arrive early for a wine tasting session, they make awkward small talk and are relieved when the rest of their party arrives.

== See also ==
- List of The Big Bang Theory episodes
