= Bill Prady =

American television writer and producer (born 1960)

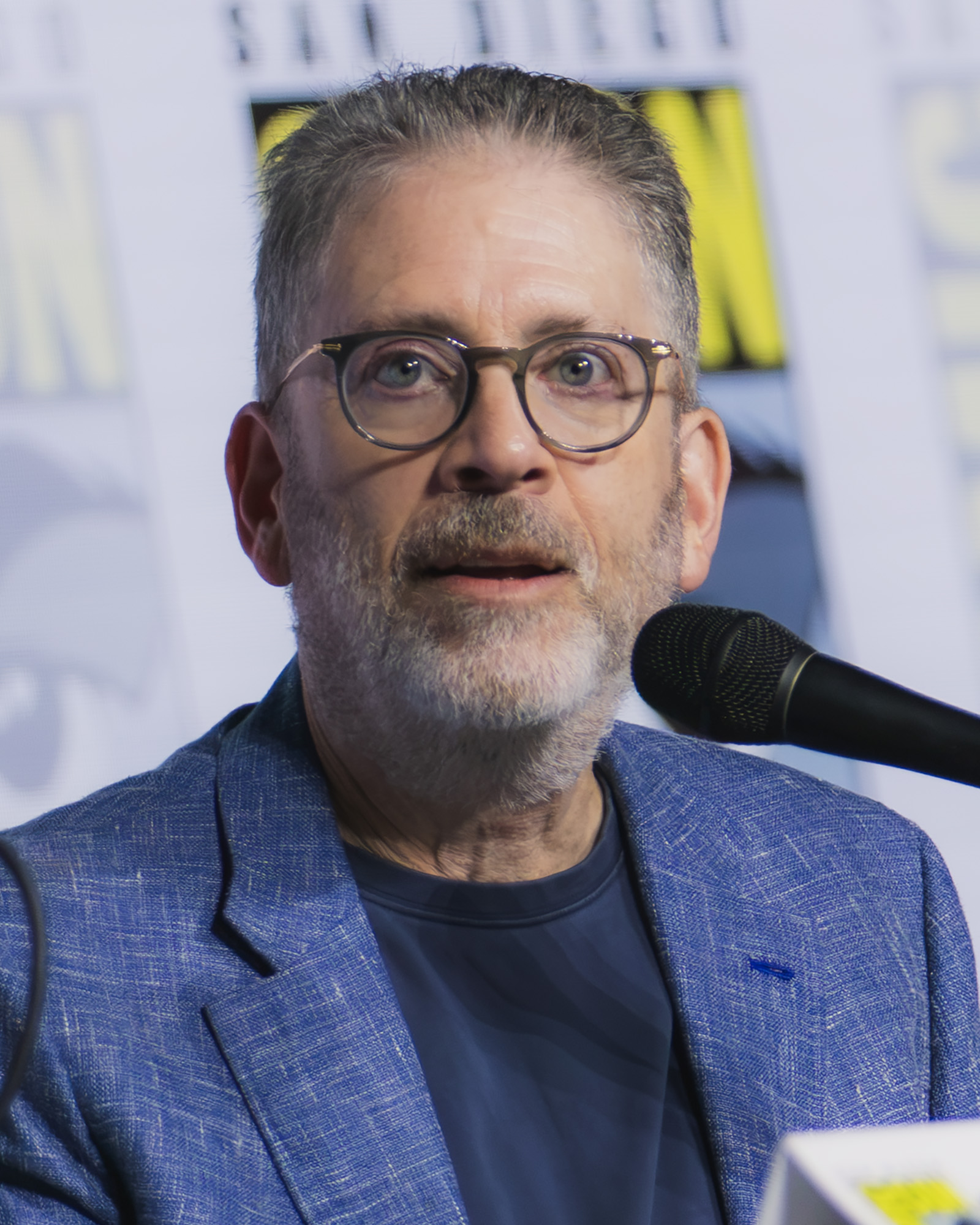
- Prady at San Diego Comic-Con in 2026

Personal details
- Born: William Scott Prady; June 7, 1960 (age 66) Detroit, Michigan, U.S.
- Party: Democratic
- Spouses: Kelly Pino (m. 1982; div. 1984); Kirith Bernstein (m. 1997; div. 2016); Jessica Queller (m. 2021)
- Occupation: Writer, television producer
- Years active: 1984–present

William Scott Prady (born June 7, 1960) is an American television writer and producer known for co-creating and producing The Big Bang Theory (2007–2019) and Stuart Fails to Save the Universe (2026–). He also served as an executive producer on Dharma & Greg (1997–2002), Good Morning, Miami (2003), and Gilmore Girls (2004–2005).

== Early life ==
Prady was born in Detroit, Michigan. He graduated from Cranbrook Schools in Bloomfield Hills, Michigan and attended Wayne State University. He dropped out of the university, and moved to New York City where he worked at a RadioShack. During this time, he was involved in the creation of the filePro software for the TRS-80 microcomputer.

== Career ==
In 1983, Prady was a production assistant for The Jim Henson Company on a proposed television special centering on the world of technology. When the project failed to come to fruition, he stayed with the company and worked in the merchandising department. With the encouragement of Jim Henson, he began writing on projects including Fraggle Rock: The Animated Series and The Jim Henson Hour (on which he was visually caricatured as the character Chip). In 1991, he received an Emmy-award nomination for co-writing The Muppets Celebrate Jim Henson. He wrote the Disney theme park attractions Muppet*Vision 3D and Honey, I Shrunk the Audience.

In 1995, Prady joined the writing staff of the HBO series Dream On. In 1997, he joined the writing staff of Dharma & Greg, rising to executive producer and taking over as showrunner in 2001. He also served as a writer and producer on Good Morning, Miami, Caroline in the City, Related, Platypus Man and Gilmore Girls.

In 2007, Prady co-created the CBS sitcom The Big Bang Theory, on which he served as executive producer for the show's twelve-season run.

In 2012, Prady joined the University of Southern California as an adjunct faculty member in its cinematic arts school. In April 2015, it was announced that ABC had picked up Prady's pilot presentation for a new version of The Muppet Show with Bob Kushell attached as showrunner.

In January 2020, Prady signed a first-look deal with Netflix to develop scripted series for the streamer. In 2022, he entered a similar agreement with Warner Bros. Television to develop scripted programming under his production company Pine Tree Entertainment.

In 2026, he joined Chuck Lorre and Zak Penn to create the series Stuart Fails to Save the Universe for HBO Max.

== Personal life ==
Prady is Jewish and is on the autism spectrum.

Prady was one of 135 candidates who ran for Governor of California in the 2003 recall election, running as a Democrat, and receiving 474 votes, tying him for 111th place.

In 2010, Prady was given honorary membership in the Royal Canadian Institute for the Advancement of Science. In 2013, Prady was awarded NASA's Exceptional Public Achievement Medal. He has served as a trustee of the Humanitas Prize "New Voices" program. In 2022, he was awarded the degree of Doctor of Humane Letters honoris causa by Wayne State University.

In 2020, Prady made a cameo appearance in Bill & Ted Face the Music.

== Filmography ==
=== Film ===
Year(s)	Title	Role
1993	Billy Bunny's Animal Songs	Writer; direct-to-video film
1994	Muppet Classic Theater	Writer; direct-to-video film
1995	Here Come the Munsters	Writer; television film
2020	Bill & Ted Face the Music	Scientist #1

=== Television ===
Year(s)	Title	Role
1985–1986	You Can't Do That On Television	Writer
1987	Fraggle Rock: The Animated Series	Writer
1989	The Jim Henson Hour	Writer
1990	The Cosby Show	Writer
1990	The Magical World of Disney	Writer
1990	The Muppets Celebrate Jim Henson	Writer; television special
1991	Married... with Children	Writer
1991	The Carol Burnett Show	Writer
1994–1996	Dream On	Writer, story editor, producer
1995	Platypus Man	Writer, episode: "Lower East Side Story"
1995–1997	Caroline in the City	Writer, producer
1997–2002	Dharma & Greg	Writer, executive producer
1999	Star Trek: Voyager	Writer
2003	Good Morning, Miami	Writer, executive producer
2004–2005	Gilmore Girls	Writer, co-executive producer
2005	Related	Writer, co-executive producer
2006	Two and a Half Men	Writer
2007–2019	The Big Bang Theory	Creator, writer, executive producer
2015–2016	The Muppets	Creator, executive producer, writer
2017–2024	Young Sheldon	Executive consultant, consulting producer
2026-	Stuart Fails to Save the Universe	Creator, executive producer, writer

== Awards and nominations ==
Year	Award	Category	Program	Result
1989	WGA Award	Outstanding Achievement: Variety, Musical, Award, Tribute or Special Event	Miss Piggy's Hollywood	Won
1990	WGA Award	Outstanding Achievement: Variety, Musical, Award, Tribute or Special Event	The Earth Day Special	Won
1991	CableACE Award	Outstanding Achievement in Children's Programming	The Presidential Inaugural Celebration for Children	Won
1991	WGA Award	Outstanding Achievement: Variety, Musical, Award, Tribute or Special Event	The Muppets Celebrate Jim Henson	Won
1991	Emmy Award	Outstanding Writing in a Variety or Music Program	The Muppets Celebrate Jim Henson	Nominated
1996	The People's Choice Awards	Favorite New Television Comedy Series	Caroline in the City	Won
1998	The People's Choice Awards	Favorite New Television Comedy Series	Dharma & Greg	Won
1998	Golden Globe Award	Best Series: Musical or Comedy	Dharma & Greg	Nominated
1999	Golden Globe Award	Best Series: Musical or Comedy	Dharma & Greg	Nominated
1999	WGA Award	Outstanding Achievement: Comedy Series	Dharma & Greg	Nominated
2009	TCA Award	Outstanding Achievement in Comedy	The Big Bang Theory	Won
2009	Satellite Award	Best Television Series: Musical or Comedy	The Big Bang Theory	Nominated
2010	Golden Globe Award	Best Series: Musical or Comedy	The Big Bang Theory	Nominated
2010	The People's Choice Awards	Favorite Television Comedy Series	The Big Bang Theory	Won
2010	TCA Award	Outstanding Achievement in Comedy	The Big Bang Theory	Nominated
2011	Emmy Award	Outstanding Comedy Series	The Big Bang Theory	Nominated
2011	The People's Choice Awards	Favorite Television Comedy Series	The Big Bang Theory	Nominated
2011	Producers Guild of America Award	Outstanding Comedy Series	The Big Bang Theory	Nominated
2011	Critics' Choice Television Award	Best Comedy Series	The Big Bang Theory	Nominated
2012	Satellite Award	Best Television Series: Musical or Comedy	The Big Bang Theory	Won
2012	TCA Award	Outstanding Achievement in Comedy	The Big Bang Theory	Nominated
2012	Monte-Carlo Television Festival	Outstanding International Producer	The Big Bang Theory	Nominated
2012	Emmy Award	Outstanding Comedy Series	The Big Bang Theory	Nominated
2012	Producers Guild of America Award	Outstanding Comedy Series	The Big Bang Theory	Nominated
2012	Critics' Choice Television Award	Best Comedy Series	The Big Bang Theory	Nominated
2012	Golden Globe Award	Best Series: Musical or Comedy	The Big Bang Theory	Nominated
2013	The People's Choice Awards	Favorite Television Comedy Series	The Big Bang Theory	Won
2013	Critics' Choice Television Award	Best Comedy Series	The Big Bang Theory	Won
2013	TCA Award	Outstanding Achievement in Comedy	The Big Bang Theory	Won
2013	Teen Choice Awards	Choice Award: Best Comedy	The Big Bang Theory	Nominated
2013	Monte-Carlo Television Festival	International TV Audience Award	The Big Bang Theory	Won
2013	Emmy Award	Outstanding Comedy Series	The Big Bang Theory	Nominated
2013	Golden Globe Award	Best Series: Musical or Comedy	The Big Bang Theory	Nominated
2014	The People's Choice Awards	Favorite Television Comedy Series	The Big Bang Theory	Won
2022	Drama League Award	Outstanding Production of a Play	Dana H.	Nominated
