= Smoot (disambiguation) =

A smoot is a jocular unit of measurement equal to 5 feet 7 inches (1.702 m).

Smoot or Smoots may also refer to:

== Places ==
- Smoots, Virginia, US
- Smoot, West Virginia, US
- Smoot, Wyoming, US
- Smoots Creek, a river in Kansas
- Smoot Rock, Marie Byrd Land, Antarctica

== People ==
- Abraham O. Smoot (1815–1895), mayor of Salt Lake City, Utah
- Brigham Smoot (1869–1946), Utah-Idaho Sugar Company executive and son of Abraham O. Smoot
- Clement Smoot (1884–1963), American golfer
- Dan Smoot (1913–2003), FBI agent and conservative political activist
- Dawuane Smoot (born 1995), American football player
- Fred Smoot (born 1979), American football player
- George Smoot (1945–2025), American astrophysicist, cosmologist, and Nobel laureate in Physics, 2006
- Homer Smoot (1878–1928), American baseball player
- Julianna Smoot (born 1967), political fundraiser for the Democratic Party
- L. Douglas Smoot (1934–2020), American chemical engineer
- Lanny Smoot (born 1955), American electrical engineer, inventor
- Mary Ellen W. Smoot (1933–2025), Relief Society General President of the Church of Jesus Christ of Latter-day Saints
- Oliver R. Smoot (born 1940), former head of ISO and ANSI, for whom the unit was named
- Reed Smoot (1862–1941), Senator from Utah, sponsor of the Smoot-Hawley Tariff and son of Abraham O. Smoot
- Reed Smoot (cinematographer), American cinematographer
- Roland N. Smoot (1901–1984), United States Navy vice admiral

=== Characters ===
- Smoot, half of Canadian horror clown duo Mump and Smoot
- Midge Smoot, a fictional character from Shining Time Station
- Snappy Sammy Smoot, American underground comix character

== Law ==
- Smoot–Hawley Tariff Act, 1930 US protectionist trade legislation
