= The Big Bang Theory season 2 =

The Big Bang Theory
- Season 2
- DVD cover art
- Showrunner: Bill Prady
- Starring: Johnny Galecki; Jim Parsons; Kaley Cuoco; Simon Helberg; Kunal Nayyar; Sara Gilbert
- No. of episodes: 23

Release
- Original network: CBS
- Original release: September 22, 2008 – May 11, 2009

Season chronology
- ← Previous; Season 1 Next → Season 3

The second season of the American television sitcom The Big Bang Theory aired on CBS from September 22, 2008 to May 11, 2009.

A DVD consisting of all 23 episodes of the season was released on September 15, 2009, and a Blu-ray version was reissued on July 10, 2012, with remastered surround sound audio, whereas the DVD version only had stereo.

Jim Parsons submitted the episode "The Bath Item Gift Hypothesis" for consideration due to his nomination for the Primetime Emmy Award for Outstanding Lead Actor in a Comedy Series at the 61st Primetime Emmy Awards. In mid-2009, TV Guide ranked the episode #60 on its list for the 100 Greatest Episodes. Christine Baranski submitted the episode "The Maternal Capacitance" for consideration due to her nomination for the Primetime Emmy Award for Outstanding Guest Actress in a Comedy Series at the 61st Primetime Emmy Awards.

== Production ==
After the Writers Guild of America strike ended in February 2008, the series was picked up for a second season, airing in the 2008–09 television season.

== Cast ==
=== Main cast ===
- Johnny Galecki as Dr. Leonard Hofstadter
- Jim Parsons as Dr. Sheldon Cooper
- Kaley Cuoco as Penny
- Simon Helberg as Howard Wolowitz
- Kunal Nayyar as Dr. Rajesh "Raj" Koothrappali
- Sara Gilbert as Leslie Winkle

=== Recurring cast ===
- Carol Ann Susi as Mrs. Wolowitz
- Mark Harelik as Dr. Eric Gablehauser
- Brian George as Dr. V.M. Koothrappali
- Alice Amter as Mrs. Koothrappali
- John Ross Bowie as Dr. Barry Kripke
- Sara Rue as Dr. Stephanie Barnett
- Christine Baranski as Dr. Beverly Hofstadter
- Kevin Sussman as Stuart Bloom
- Brian Patrick Wade as Kurt

=== Guest cast ===
- Travis Schuldt as Eric
- Charlie Sheen as himself
- Octavia Spencer as DMV employee
- Riki Lindhome as Ramona Nowitzki
- Lio Tipton (Note: Credited as Analeigh Tipton; Tipton came out as non-binary and changed their name in 2021.) as herself
- Emily Happe as Kathy O'Brien
- Samantha Potter as herself
- Michael Trucco as Dr. David Underhill
- Summer Glau as herself
- George Smoot as himself
- Valerie Azlynn as Alicia
- Jodi Lyn O'Keefe as Mikayla

== Episodes ==
No. overall	No. in season	Title	Directed by	Written by	Original release date	Prod. code	U.S. viewers (millions)
18	1	"The Bad Fish Paradigm"	Mark Cendrowski	Story by : Bill Prady; Teleplay by : Dave Goetsch & Steven Molaro	September 22, 2008	3T7351	9.32
After Leonard and Penny return home from their first date, Penny admits to Sheldon that she lied to Leonard about graduating from community college, feeling he would not want to date a woman who is not smart, and makes Sheldon promise not to tell him. Sheldon cannot easily keep secrets, and moves out of the apartment to escape his inner conflict. He first stays with Raj, but after Sheldon criticizes Aishwarya Rai, comparing her unfavorably to Madhuri Dixit, Raj leaves him at Howard's house. Sheldon talks instead of sleeping, so Howard gives him Valium, which fails to work, and finally takes him back to the apartment. The drugged Sheldon tells Leonard the secret. The next morning, Leonard suggests Penny should join Pasadena City College, but after she asks, says he does not mind dating someone who is not smart, at which she slams her door in his face.
19	2	"The Codpiece Topology"	Mark Cendrowski	Story by : Chuck Lorre; Teleplay by : Bill Prady & Lee Aronsohn	September 29, 2008	3T7352	8.60
After the guys return from a Renaissance fair and see Penny with her new boyfriend Eric, Leonard is approached in the Caltech cafeteria by Leslie Winkle, who proposes renewing their one-time "relationship". As she has grown out of one-night stands she suggests they take it slowly and get to know each other first. Penny dumps Eric after unsuccessfully using him to make Leonard jealous (including a competitive make-out session between Penny and Eric and Leonard and Leslie; Leslie helping Leonard make his point). Sheldon tells Penny he is uncomfortable with Leonard dating his arch enemy Leslie, but on Penny's advice he accepts the relationship. Almost immediately, however, Sheldon deliberately provokes an argument with Leslie over the validity of loop quantum gravity, which Leslie supports, and string theory, which Sheldon favors. Leslie expects Leonard to back her beliefs, but when he supports Sheldon, Leslie dumps Leonard, to Sheldon's relief. Sheldon then comforts Leonard with the fact that it is only nine months until Comic-Con.
20	3	"The Barbarian Sublimation"	Mark Cendrowski	Story by : Nicole Lorre; Teleplay by : Steven Molaro & Eric Kaplan	October 6, 2008	3T7353	9.39
Sheldon lets Penny wait for the locksmith in his apartment after she accidentally locks herself out. Penny, frustrated at making no progress in her acting career and not having had sex for six months, becomes curious on seeing Sheldon play Age of Conan. He helps Penny get started; she buys the game and soon succumbs to video game addiction, annoying Sheldon by persistently asking him for game tips night and day. In desperation he asks Leonard for help, who tries to talk with her in her apartment, but she practically ignores him. Leonard then tries approaching her character within the game, but she merely beheads his character. After listening to Leslie in the Caltech cafeteria, Sheldon is convinced that Penny needs to have sex to relieve her stress and restore her regular life. Sheldon attempts to fix Penny a date with the aid of an online dating service, but fails. In the end, Penny is horrified to realize she has accepted a virtual date with Howard, and promptly stops playing, thus overcoming her addiction.
21	4	"The Griffin Equivalency"	Mark Cendrowski	Story by : Bill Prady & Chuck Lorre; Teleplay by : Stephen Engel & Tim Doyle	October 13, 2008	3T7354	9.34
Raj is included in People magazine's "30 Visionaries Under 30 Years Old to Watch" list for his discovery of the trans-Neptunian object 2008 NQ_{17}, making his friends jealous, though Leonard finds that they should be happy for him. Raj becomes arrogant after receiving star treatment from Dr. Gablehauser and being given an assistant, so all the guys ditch him, and he invites Penny to his People reception. After the party, a very intoxicated Raj returns home with Penny, and via webcam he introduces her to his parents as his girlfriend. His parents object that she is not Indian, though his father likes Penny's resolute nature. She denies being Raj's girlfriend, and escapes after he becomes sick from overdrinking. The following morning, a sober and shy Raj attempts to give Penny a written apology, but she forces him to utter a barely audible "sorry" before forgiving him.
22	5	"The Euclid Alternative"	Mark Cendrowski	Story by : Bill Prady & Steven Molaro; Teleplay by : Lee Aronsohn & Dave Goetsch	October 20, 2008	3T7355	9.33
For several days Leonard works on an experiment involving a free-electron laser which is only available at night, so he cannot drive Sheldon to the university as usual. In succession, Sheldon asks Penny, Howard and Raj to drive him, but each in turn ejects him from the vehicle for being annoying. The group finally stage an intervention and tell Sheldon to get a driver's license and learn to drive. After a trip to the DMV results in Sheldon getting his learner's permit, the group sets up a driving simulator for him in the living room. However, Sheldon turns out to be an appalling driver, claiming to be too highly evolved to learn to drive, so he decides to live in his university office to avoid having to commute. Leonard finally reveals he actually finished his experiment a week earlier than he stated, but kept up the pretence to avoid having to drive Sheldon to work.
23	6	"The Cooper–Nowitzki Theorem"	Mark Cendrowski	Story by : Stephen Engel & Daley Haggar; Teleplay by : Tim Doyle & Richard Rosenstock	November 3, 2008	3T7356	9.67
After a lecture by Leonard and Sheldon, a graduate student named Ramona Nowitzki is so impressed by Sheldon that she insinuates herself into his life as his platonic girlfriend/assistant/manager, to the puzzlement of Penny and the guys. Ramona proves to be a helpful influence on Sheldon's work, even bettering his rival Leslie Winkle in a verbal confrontation, but Ramona moves into his apartment to control him, prohibiting his usual recreational activities and forcing him to concentrate solely on his research. Eventually Sheldon realizes that he is in "some sort of relationship" with Ramona, and unsuccessfully seeks help from Penny and Leonard to get rid of her. Sheldon eventually makes a research breakthrough he tells Ramona he would never have achieved without her, and gratefully asks how he can repay her. She suggests they share credit for his discovery by calling it "The Cooper-Nowitzki Theorem". Upon hearing this, he angrily ejects her. After another student reads a preprint of the new theorem, she approaches Sheldon in the same way Ramona initially did.
24	7	"The Panty Piñata Polarization"	Mark Cendrowski	Story by : Bill Prady & Tim Doyle; Teleplay by : Jennifer Glickman & Steven Molaro	November 10, 2008	3T7357	10.01
When Penny's TV cable is blocked after she fails to keep up with her monthly payments, she goes to the guys' apartment to watch America's Next Top Model, to Sheldon's despair and Howard's and Raj's delight. However, she accidentally touches Sheldon's onion rings and sits on his spot on the couch, thus scoring "three strikes" including an earlier offense, so he banishes her from his apartment. She later refuses to serve him at the Cheesecake Factory. Their dispute escalates, with Sheldon blocking Penny's Wi-Fi access and Penny sabotaging Sheldon's laundry night. Eventually, after Sheldon hangs her clean underwear on an outdoor telephone wire, Leonard gives Penny Sheldon's mother's phone number, "Sheldon's kryptonite", so Penny can complain to her about Sheldon. His mother forces him to apologize to Penny and give back her laundry. Meanwhile, Howard finds out that the models in America's Next Top Model are in a house in Los Angeles. Determined to enter the house, he and Raj search for it using all available technologies, legal and otherwise, and actually find it. Howard and Raj finally get in by posing as cable guys.
25	8	"The Lizard–Spock Expansion"	Mark Cendrowski	Story by : Bill Prady & Hart Hanson; Teleplay by : Dave Goetsch & Jennifer Glickman	November 17, 2008	3T7358	9.76
Howard meets Dr. Stephanie Barnett at a bar and invites her to the Jet Propulsion Laboratory to drive the Mars rover, but his plan fails when the rover gets stuck in a Martian ditch; he has Leonard smuggle his unauthorized lady visitor out of the building. She immediately likes Leonard, much preferring him to Howard, and makes out with him in his car. Howard subsequently destroys all security tapes and hard drives relating to the mission. Later, Stephanie tells Howard that she has started dating Leonard, but Howard forgives the pair when she invites him to meet her friend Lisa on a double date. In the end, Howard hears on TV news that the rover found water on Mars at the bottom of the ditch, but because he had all the security data destroyed, it could not be determined who was responsible for the discovery. Meanwhile, Sheldon and Raj play a game of rock-paper-scissors-lizard-Spock, "The Lizard-Spock Expansion" of the traditional rock-paper-scissors game, to decide who gets to watch what on TV, but they both choose Spock. They, along with Howard, then play the game for Leonard's dumpling. When, again, all choose Spock, they conclude that someone must stop playing Spock. They try to determine who by playing the game but, yet again, all choose Spock.
26	9	"The White Asparagus Triangulation"	Mark Cendrowski	Story by : Dave Goetsch & Steven Molaro; Teleplay by : Stephen Engel & Richard Rosenstock	November 24, 2008	3T7359	10.03
Sheldon regards medical doctor Stephanie as the only "tolerable" girlfriend Leonard ever had, and also the ideal doctor for Sheldon's Enterprise crew, so he tries to help Leonard with his relationship, fearing Leonard will ruin it. However, Sheldon dismays Leonard by joining the couple when they have a romantic dinner and go to the movies. Believing that Leonard is losing Stephanie, Sheldon wants Leonard to open a recalcitrant jar of white asparagus in Stephanie's presence to emphasize his physical strength. However, Leonard accidentally shatters the jar, cutting himself. Stephanie gives him the necessary stitches at her hospital and later tells him she will not be sleeping with him that night as planned, as he needs rest. At home, Leonard finds Sheldon hacked his Facebook account and changed his status to "In a relationship" and yells at him for attempting to intervene in a relationship in which he has no experience. Howard says this, after only two weeks, makes Leonard appear desperate, but Raj then discovers Stephanie apparently changed her status to "Stephanie Barnett is in a relationship with Leonard Hofstadter". Sheldon, delighted at the improved developments in Leonard's and Stephanie's relationship at his intervention, proclaims "Dr. Sheldon Cooper for the win."
27	10	"The Vartabedian Conundrum"	Mark Cendrowski	Story by : Chuck Lorre & Steven Molaro; Teleplay by : Bill Prady & Richard Rosenstock	December 8, 2008	3T7360	10.50
Stephanie effectively moves into Leonard's and Sheldon's apartment, though Leonard does not acknowledge this until Sheldon and Penny point it out; Penny then searches Leonard's room with him, discovering various signs that Stephanie is indeed living with him. After Stephanie buys Leonard new clothes that he later hates, he realizes that his relationship with Stephanie is moving too fast for him. He repeatedly tries to tell Stephanie to move out, but each time she diverts him by initiating sex. Meanwhile, Stephanie gives Sheldon a physical examination when he complains about his tinnitus. After Sheldon sneaks into the hospital to test himself, Stephanie diagnoses Sheldon with a fake larynx inflammation and instructs him not to speak at all, a procedure she calls a "Sheldonectomy".
28	11	"The Bath Item Gift Hypothesis"	Mark Cendrowski	Story by : Bill Prady & Richard Rosenstock; Teleplay by : Stephen Engel & Eric Kaplan	December 15, 2008	3T7361	11.22
Leonard meets visiting researcher and fellow experimental physicist Dr. David Underhill. Though Leonard envies David for being handsome and a more successful physicist than himself, he jumps at David's offer to help him in his research. Things come to a halt when David meets Penny and the two start dating—though they quickly break up when Penny discovers nude photos of his wife on his phone. Leonard only learns this when he comes to Penny's apartment to yell at her about their own on-off relationship. When he realizes his mistake, he and Penny cuddle each other to comfort each other. Meanwhile, Sheldon worries about the approaching Christmas holidays and his indecision about what to buy for Penny, as he needs it to match the value of her gift to him. After deciding on a basket of bath items he discovers a large selection, so not knowing what Penny will get him, he buys the entire range to cover all contingencies. Penny's gift to Sheldon is a napkin both autographed and used by Leonard Nimoy. Sheldon, overwhelmed since he now possesses Nimoy's DNA and can grow his own Leonard Nimoy, gives Penny all the gift baskets and also a rare "Sheldon" hug.
29	12	"The Killer Robot Instability"	Mark Cendrowski	Story by : Bill Prady & Richard Rosenstock; Teleplay by : Steven Molaro & Daley Haggar	January 12, 2009	3T7362	11.81
Howard designs a combat robot, M.O.N.T.E. (Mobile Omnidirectional Neutralization and Termination Eradicator) for the "Southern California Robot Fighting League Round Robin Invitational", which the guys plan to enter. When Penny arrives at the apartment, Howard begins to flirt with her but pushes it too far, and she furiously lashes out at him with some uncomfortable truths. Hurt and depressed, Howard returns home and remains in his room, refusing to leave the house. Leonard persuades Penny to go to Howard's house and apologize. Howard tells Penny about all his failed romances, and she consoles him by saying that he is a good guy at heart and he just tries too hard to get girls. He thereupon tries to kiss Penny, who intercepts him with a punch that breaks his nose. Howard is left happy, feeling he is halfway to "pity sex". Meanwhile, the guys' co-worker Barry Kripke, who is also entering the competition, challenges Sheldon and the guys to a one-on-one fight between their robots. Sheldon accepts, but Kripke's robot turns out to be far superior to M.O.N.T.E. and, with engineer Howard indisposed, Barry can easily win. Sheldon refuses to concede defeat, and M.O.N.T.E. is destroyed by Kripke's robot.
30	13	"The Friendship Algorithm"	Mark Cendrowski	Story by : Bill Prady & Richard Rosenstock; Teleplay by : Chuck Lorre & Steven Molaro	January 19, 2009	3T7363	11.03
Sheldon hears that Kripke controls access to an Open Science Grid computer, so he plans to befriend him to gain access to it. The socially inept Sheldon struggles, and his current friends are of little help in this area so, in the hope of finding self-help literature on friendship, he has Leonard drive him to the bookstore. There Sheldon tries making friends with a little girl, but Leonard makes him exit quickly before he is picked up as a pedophile. A children's book from the store helps Sheldon design an algorithm in flowchart form for making new friends. This pays off when Sheldon goes rock climbing with Kripke, but Sheldon faints due to his fear of heights. Back at the apartment, Sheldon decides to cut off Raj as a friend to make room for Kripke. However, when Kripke reveals he does not actually control computer access, Sheldon dismisses him and restores Raj as a friend.
31	14	"The Financial Permeability"	Mark Cendrowski	Story by : Chuck Lorre & Steven Molaro; Teleplay by : Richard Rosenstock & Eric Kaplan	February 2, 2009	3T7364	10.84
When Penny experiences major financial difficulties, Sheldon lends her some money which she can repay at her leisure. When Leonard learns about Penny's problems, he tries to help her cut her expenses, and in the process learns that her ex-boyfriend Kurt owes her $1,800. Without telling Penny, Leonard and the guys go to Kurt's place to recover the money. They are unsuccessful, though Kurt writes "I owe Penny $1,800, Kurt" on Leonard's forehead in indelible ink. Penny later repays Sheldon after Kurt unexpectedly repays her but, much to Leonard's disappointment, Kurt did not tell Penny about Leonard's visit, instead taking the opportunity to try to get back together with her.
32	15	"The Maternal Capacitance"	Mark Cendrowski	Story by : Chuck Lorre & Bill Prady; Teleplay by : Richard Rosenstock & Steven Molaro	February 9, 2009	3T7365	12.72
Leonard becomes worried when he learns his mother, accomplished psychiatrist and neuroscientist Dr. Beverly Hofstadter, is coming to visit. On arriving, Beverly meets Penny; by the time they have climbed the stairs to Leonard's apartment, Penny is in tears after being psychoanalyzed over her childhood issues with her father. Sheldon, on the other hand, immediately develops a comfortable relationship with Beverly, who turns out to be as strict and logical as himself. Howard and Raj meet Beverly too, but after learning that Howard still lives with his mother and Raj cannot talk to women, she is quick to declare that they are in an "ersatz homosexual marriage". Leonard later goes to talk to Penny and they comfort each other by discussing their respective childhood issues with their parents. After becoming drunk, Penny and Leonard end up in bed together, but Leonard ruins the moment by invoking psychiatric theory, implying that he is effectively having sex with his mom and she with her dad. Horrified at their actions, Penny throws Leonard out of her apartment. She wants to talk about it the next day, but Leonard begs her never to speak of it again.
33	16	"The Cushion Saturation"	Mark Cendrowski	Story by : Chuck Lorre; Teleplay by : Bill Prady & Lee Aronsohn	March 2, 2009	3T7366	10.83
After a paintball match, Penny accidentally shoots several green paintballs at Sheldon's couch cushion, and she and Leonard try hard to fix it. Sheldon, still upset and dissatisfied with his eventually dry-cleaned cushion, team-kills Penny in the next paintball game, causing the others to surrender. Meanwhile, Leslie and Howard begin a relationship after having sex (twice) during the match. Leslie secures funds for his work and even invites him to a trip to the CERN Large Hadron Collider project in Geneva, but threatens to withdraw the invitation unless he accompanies her to a wedding. So sex is just Leslie's way of controlling Howard. Although initially reluctant, Howard later happily accepts his role as a "sex toy/arm candy" after Leslie comforts him.
34	17	"The Terminator Decoupling"	Mark Cendrowski	Story by : Bill Prady & Dave Goetsch & Hart Hanson; Teleplay by : Tim Doyle & Stephen Engel	March 9, 2009	3T7367	9.47
The guys take a trip to a conference in San Francisco to meet guest speaker and 2006 Nobel Prize laureate Dr. George Smoot. On the train, the guys notice Summer Glau of Terminator: The Sarah Connor Chronicles is on their car. Raj drinks a beer before being the first to approach her, and they get on well until Howard discovers Raj actually drank non-alcoholic beer, which apparently had a placebo effect, and points this out to Raj who thereupon reverts to his usual selective mutism. Howard then takes over, but creeps Summer out with his awkward style. Leonard finally gets his chance, but Summer gets off the train before he can introduce himself. Meanwhile, Sheldon realizes he forgot the USB flash drive with the paper he wants to show to Smoot, and needs extensive help from Penny to find it and email it to him. At the conference, however, Smoot is not impressed by Sheldon's research.
35	18	"The Work Song Nanocluster"	Peter Chakos	Story by : Bill Prady & Lee Aronsohn; Teleplay by : Dave Goetsch & Richard Rosenstock	March 16, 2009	3T7368	9.69
Penny develops home-made hair barrettes she calls 'Penny Blossoms' and aims to turn them into a profitable homebased business. With Sheldon's help, Penny develops an efficient assembly line, and Howard, Raj and Leonard later join in. Leonard designs the sales website, and they immediately get an order for a thousand Penny Blossoms from the East Rutherford, New Jersey Gay-Lesbian-Bisexual-Transgender Alliance. Despite their initial happiness, they realize Leonard accidentally included a one-day rush shipping option on the website, so the group has to work all night to fulfill the order. However, the next morning, they discover that the same group doubled their order, and the guys quit in exhaustion. Sheldon, drinking coffee to stay awake, races around the apartment dressed as The Flash while attempting to help Penny with the new order.
36	19	"The Dead Hooker Juxtaposition"	Mark Cendrowski	Steven Molaro	March 30, 2009	3T7369	9.74
The former tenants of the apartment above Leonard and Sheldon's move out. After an unsuccessful attempt by Howard to rent the apartment, an attractive blonde named Alicia moves in. Alicia, like Penny, is an aspiring actress; she obtains a role as a dead hooker in an episode of the TV series CSI. Apart from Sheldon the guys are fascinated by Alicia, and she takes advantage of this by having them help her move in and otherwise labor for her. Penny thus loses the guys' attention, and begins to resent the way Alicia exploits them. Penny tries to win her friends back by bribing them with Chinese food, offering to watch Battlestar Galactica with them, and even memorizing a quantum physics joke. After Alicia brags about her exploitation of the men, while also desiring their incomes, Penny confronts her. Alicia responds that Penny exploits the men just as she does, upon which Penny physically attacks her. After the fight, the guys take an injured Penny back to Leonard and Sheldon's apartment and learn that Alicia is sleeping with one of the CSI producers, leading Penny to comment that Alicia is a "dead whore on TV, live one in real life".
37	20	"The Hofstadter Isotope"	Mark Cendrowski	Dave Goetsch	April 13, 2009	3T7370	10.06
When Penny accompanies the guys to the comic book store to buy a present for her nephew's birthday, the owner, Stuart, asks her out on a date, making Leonard jealous. To take his mind off the situation, Leonard asks Howard and Raj to take him to a bar to socialize with women, but neither he nor Howard succeed in finding a woman. They decide to give up, only to see a large woman has found Raj. Stuart's date with Penny goes well until they are intercepted at Penny's apartment by Sheldon, who starts an argument with Stuart about who should succeed Bruce Wayne as Batman, during which Penny falls asleep. Raj wakes up in the bed of the large woman, her fat arm holding him in a tight grip. He tries to get up but she pulls him back. He brushes the situation off and dozes.
38	21	"The Vegas Renormalization"	Mark Cendrowski	Story by : Jessica Ambrosetti & Nicole Lorre & Andrew Roth; Teleplay by : Steven Molaro	April 27, 2009	3T7371	9.24
Leslie ends her 'friends with benefits' relationship with Howard, upsetting him. Leonard and Raj take him on a trip to Las Vegas, Nevada to cheer him up. There, a prostitute named Mikayla approaches Raj, and he and Leonard decide to hire her for Howard. Howard soon realizes she is a prostitute, but nevertheless thanks Leonard and Raj for setting up the "date". Meanwhile, Sheldon, who has declined to go to Las Vegas, is delighted to spend the weekend alone, until he forgets his apartment key. Penny reluctantly allows him to stay over in her apartment, where he spends the night in her bed (she sleeps on her couch, which Sheldon has rejected as being too short for him) and, as a result, thinks he has a better understanding of the term "friends with benefits".
39	22	"The Classified Materials Turbulence"	Mark Cendrowski	Story by : Chuck Lorre & Lee Aronsohn; Teleplay by : Bill Prady & Steven Molaro	May 4, 2009	3T7373	9.25
Howard celebrates the launch of his latest invention, a zero-gravity human-waste disposal system (a toilet) to be used in the ISS, by buying all of his friends new comic books. However, later Howard discovers he made a mistake that will cause the toilet to fail and burst after 10 flushes, so the guys convene to try and fix it (referencing Apollo 13's Ken Mattingly), working for a whole night to find a solution and even testing the toilet with meatloaf made by Howard's mother. Howard 's fix fails and the ISS astronauts all go on an unscheduled "spacewalk". At the comic book store, Stuart tells Leonard that he is having a second date with Penny and asks for advice. Leonard deliberately avoids Stuart for as long as possible, and finally gives him bad advice. The next day, Leonard feels guilty and goes to apologize to him. Stuart reveals the date went well until they started making out in his car and Penny accidentally called him "Leonard". Leonard is secretly delighted.
40	23	"The Monopolar Expedition"	Mark Cendrowski	Eric Kaplan & Richard Rosenstock	May 11, 2009	3T7372	9.76
Sheldon wins a National Science Foundation grant to go on a three-month expedition to the Magnetic North Pole to detect magnetic monopoles and prove the validity of string theory. After some hesitation, he decides to go and invites Leonard, Howard and Raj to join him; they too initially hesitate as it would mean being locked in a cabin with Sheldon for three months, but finally agree. To prepare, Sheldon and the guys practise in the freezer room at the Cheesecake Factory, which however later proves unnecessary as they discover they will actually be spending their time in a warm cabin. On the night before the expedition, Leonard expresses doubts on going as it will mean not seeing Penny for the whole summer. He also believes Penny will miss him too, after she gives him a sleeved blanket and a long hug. The next morning, when Leonard meets Penny again, she claims to have simply wished him a safe trip, but after he closes the door she sadly whispers that she wishes he would not leave.

== Reception ==
Compared to season one, the second season received critical acclaim. Jessica Paff of Screener wrote that "if they can keep the funny coming, I will keep watching", Ken Tucker of Entertainment Weekly praised the improvements to the character of Sheldon Cooper, writing that "Prickly Sheldon has become a character to love, and [actor Jim] Parsons is doing something rare on network TV: making intellectualism admirable, even heroic", and James Chamberlin of IGN wrote that "Jim Parsons is a riot and is reason enough to tune in each week."
