= A Wrinkle in Time (disambiguation) =

A Wrinkle in Time is a 1962 science fantasy novel by Madeleine L'Engle.

A Wrinkle in Time may also refer to:

- A Wrinkle in Time (2003 film), an American television film based on the novel
- A Wrinkle in Time (2018 film), an American feature film based on the novel
- A Wrinkle in Time (soundtrack), from the 2018 film

== See also ==
- Wrinkles in Time, a 1994 book on cosmology by George Smoot and Keay Davidson
