= The Bath Item Gift Hypothesis =

- The Big Bang Theory episode
- Episode no.: Season 2 Episode 11
- Directed by: Mark Cendrowski
- Story by: Bill Prady &; Richard Rosenstock
- Teleplay by: Tim Doyle &; Stephen Engel
- Cinematography by: Steven V. Silver
- Editing by: Peter Chakos
- Original air date: December 15, 2008

Guest appearance
- Michael Trucco as David Underhill

Episode chronology
← Previous "The Vartabedian Conundrum"	Next → "The Killer Robot Instability"
- The Big Bang Theory season 2

"The Bath Item Gift Hypothesis" is the eleventh episode of the second season of the American television sitcom The Big Bang Theory and the twenty eighth episode of the series overall. It first aired on CBS in the United States on December 15, 2008.

== Plot ==
Leonard assists award winning scientist David Underhill with his research. Leonard is overjoyed to be helping Underhill but becomes jealous when the handsome scientist starts dating Penny. This quickly ends in a break-up when Penny discovers nude photos of his wife on his phone. Leonard only learns of this when he comes to Penny's apartment to confront her about their own on-off relationship. When he realises his mistake, he and Penny cuddle to comfort each other.

Sheldon who disdains Christmas as a pagan ritual is disconcerted when Penny brings him a Christmas gift. He now feels obligated to buy her a gift that matches the value of her gift to him, and enlists Wolowitz and Koothrappali to help him with this task which they reluctantly agree to. After deciding on a basket of bath items he discovers a large selection, so not knowing what Penny will get him, he buys the entire range, intending to find out online which item will match in value to Penny’s gift, and refund the rest. Penny's gift to Sheldon is a napkin both autographed and used by Leonard Nimoy. Sheldon, overwhelmed since he now possesses the DNA of a man he admires so much and considers an icon, gives Penny all the gift baskets and also a rare "Sheldon" hug.

== Reception ==
The episode received generally positive reviews. Donna Bowman of The A.V. Club said "I wasn't feeling this episode until the epilogue — and then it became so wonderful that it almost spilled over into acts one through three".

IGN's James Chamberlain called the entire episode good, while calling the end "golden", saying "...the end was nearly perfect."

TV Critic called it the best episode of the season, praising the episode for "Combining character development and humour in a blend which this show can do really well."

In 2019, The Herald-Dispatch ranked it the best Christmas TV episode of all time.
