= Ithaka Science Center =

Education center in Tegelen, Netherlands

Coordinates: 51.3401°N 6.1416°E

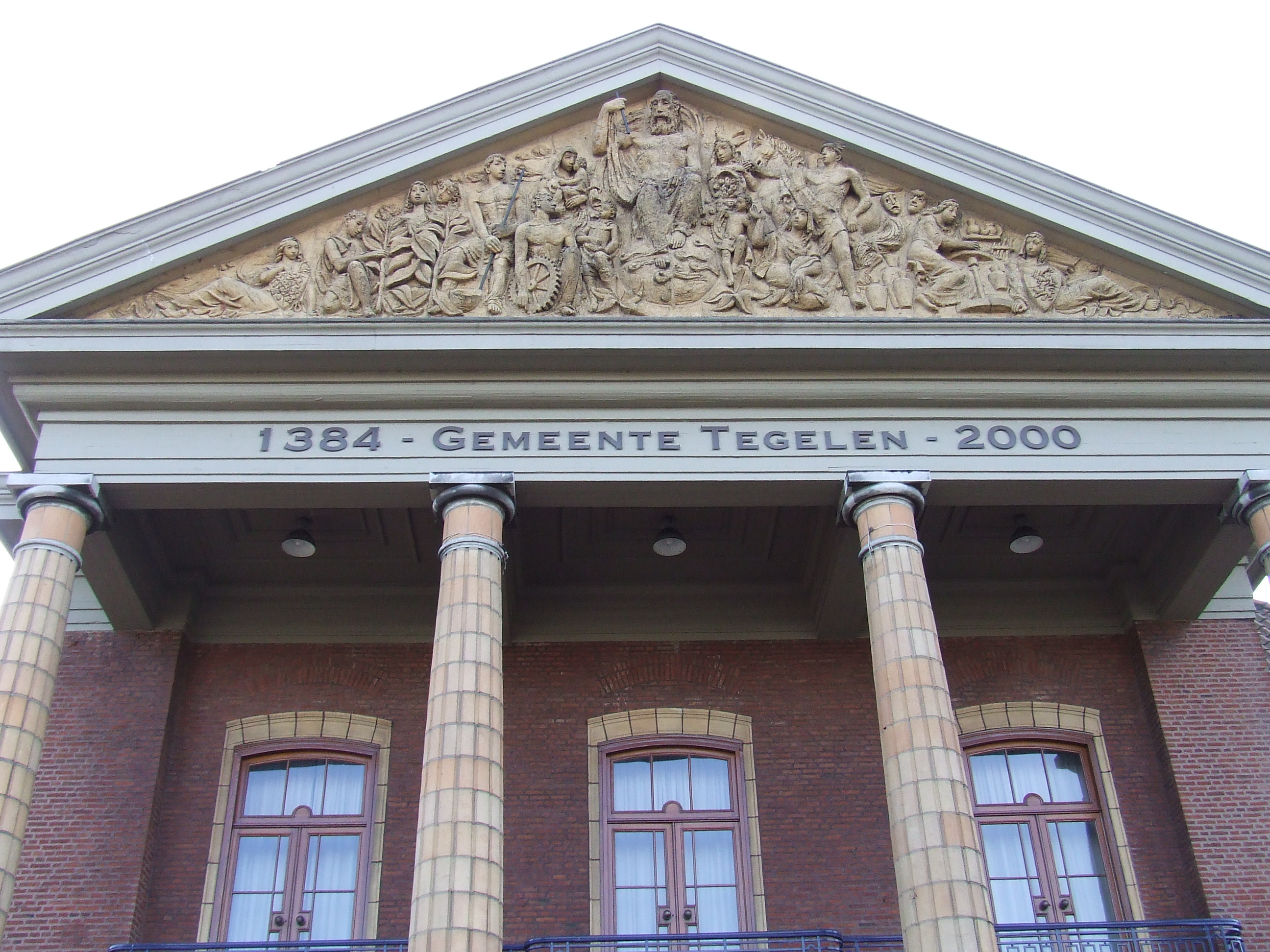
The former town hall of Tegelen

Ithaka Science Center, a hands-on science education center in Tegelen in the Netherlands, was founded in 2008 as a non-profit organization by Vaggelis E. Fragiadakis and Margriet van Tulder and funded as a public-private partnership. Its goal was stated to be to present interactive exhibits, programs, public lectures, and other events for schools and the general public.

== Building ==
The science center location at Raadhuislaan 11, in Tegelen, the Netherlands, is a historic building that served as the city hall for Tegelen. The historic façade and many internal architectural details have been preserved.

== Exhibits ==
A major feature of the center is a mixture of permanent and temporary exhibits that demonstrate scientific and technical principles. Exhibits are labeled in Dutch, English and in German, as the center is within 2 km of the border with Germany, and was designed to host visitors and schools from both countries. The first series of exhibits dealt with energy, light, and gravity. The center integrated science exhibits with art displays inspired by scientific themes. The art shown changes periodically.

== Science education ==
Before the center moved into the former townhall, Ithaka created science education programs and conferences, such as energy exhibitions, science clubs, school activities, master classes, and other special events.

For classroom teachers, the Ithaka Science Center has assembled and provides science activity kits which included instruments, materials and instructions for topics including electricity, air, mechanics, magnetism, properties of solids, liquids and gases.

The center has hosted numerous speakers on science, technology, and science education. Among them have been Nobel Laureates George Smoot, Douglas Osheroff, and Eric Maskin.

The center has online activities for children, and had produced a children's science exploration television program.

== See also ==
- List of science centers
