= Wrinkles in Time =

Book by George Smoot

- Hardcover edition
- Author: George Smoot, Keay Davidson
- Language: English
- Subject: Cosmology
- Genre: Non-fiction
- Publisher: William Morrow
- Publication date: October 1, 1994
- Publication place: United States
- Media type: Print
- Pages: 360 pp.
- ISBN: 0-380-72044-2

Wrinkles in Time is a book on cosmology by the Nobel laureate physicist George Smoot and Keay Davidson, a science writer for the San Francisco Examiner. It was published in 1994 by William Morrow in hardback.

== Summary ==
On April 23, 1992, a scientific team led by astrophysicist George Smoot announced that it had found the primordial "seeds" from which the universe has grown. They analyzed data gathered by NASA's Cosmic Background Explorer satellite and discovered the oldest known objects in the universe—so called "wrinkles" in time—thus finding a long-anticipated missing piece in the Big Bang model. In this book, Smoot tells the remarkable tale of his quest for what has been called the cosmologists' Holy Grail. His quest for the seeds of structure in the universe consumed about twenty years. The book traces the obstacle course of discovery. In the book, Smoot describes the adventure and along the way he brings the reader up to date in cosmology, giving brief introductions to some important concepts and discoveries in physics and cosmology.

The research in the book eventually resulted in Smoot winning the 2006 Nobel Prize in Physics, and the book was reprinted in 2007 as a result of the new interest generated by the award. On the cover of the reprint, theoretical physicist Stephen Hawking calls Smoot's observations in the book "the scientific discovery of the century, if not of all time".

== Contents ==
- Preface
1. In the Beginning
2. The Dark Night Sky
3. The Expanding Universe
4. Cosmological Conflict
5. In Search of Antiworlds
6. Spy in the Sky
7. A Different Universe
8. The Heart of Darkness
9. The Inflationary Universe
10. The Promise of Space
11. COBE: The Aftermath
12. First Glimpse of Wrinkles
13. An Awful Place to Do Science
14. Toward the Ultimate Question
- Appendix: Contributors to COBE
- To Dig Deeper: Further Readings
- Acknowledgments
- Index

== In popular culture ==
Wrinkles in Time was featured in an episode of The Big Bang Theory. In the episode "The Terminator Decoupling", Leonard Hofstadter was reading a copy of the book on the train. At the end of the episode, author George Smoot made a cameo appearance.

== Editions ==
- Smoot, George; Keay Davidson (1994). Wrinkles in Time. William Morrow & Company. ISBN 0-380-72044-2.
