= Yukon, Florida =

Ghost town within Jacksonville, Florida, USA

Coordinates: 30°14′N 81°42′W

Yukon is a ghost town located within Jacksonville, Florida. The Navy closed the town in July 1963 as it was deemed a flight and safety hazard for nearby Jacksonville Naval Air Station. Nobel Prize Laureate George Smoot was born here in 1945. The Tillie K. Fowler Regional Park now sits on the town's former site. The historic Brick Road Trail runs through the former site of Yukon.

== See also ==
- List of ghost towns in Florida
