= Harvard Bridge =

Charles River overpass

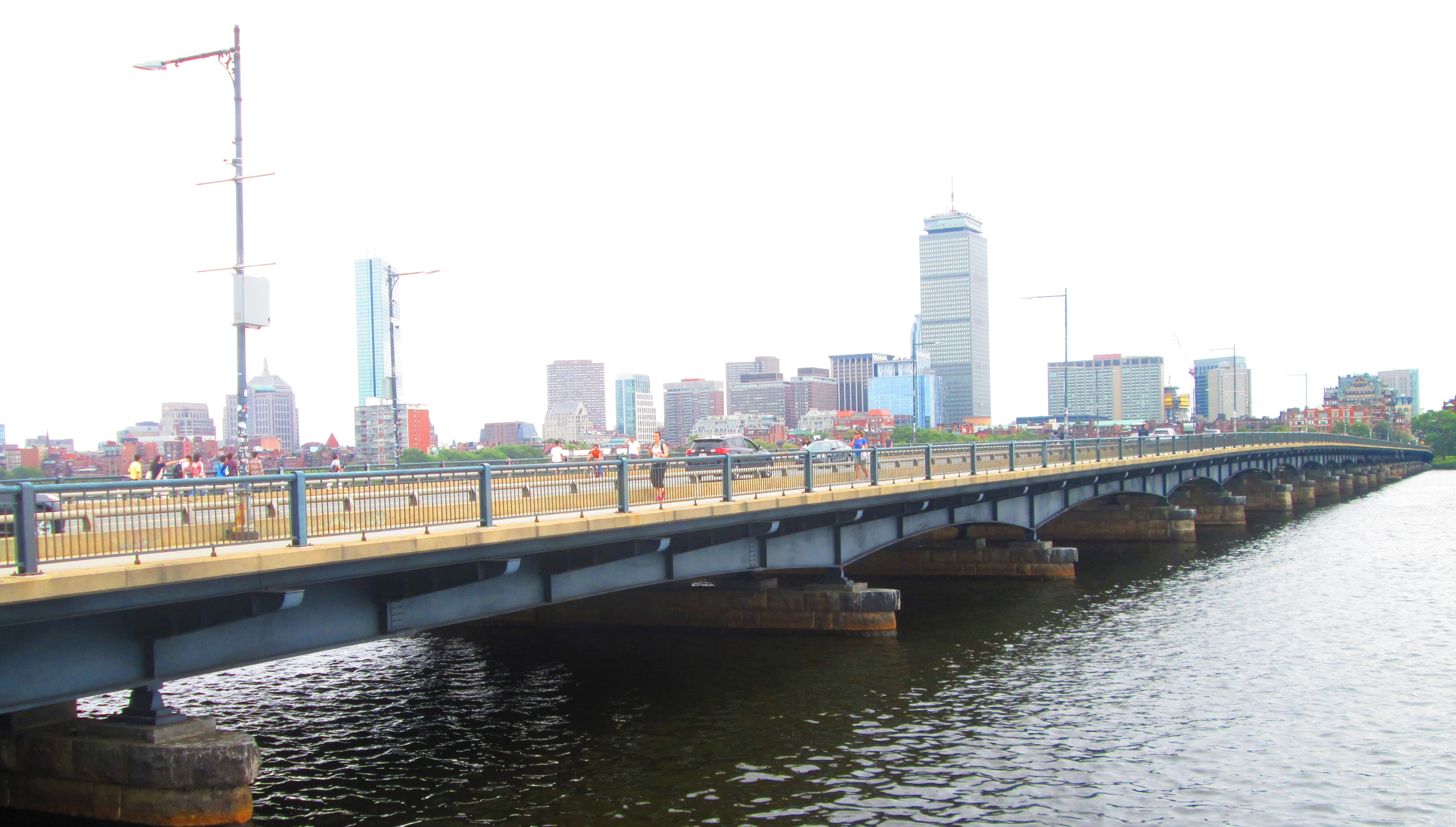
- Harvard Bridge seen from Cambridge in August 2017
- Coordinates: 42.35457°N 71.09132°W
- Carries: Route 2A
- Crosses: Charles River
- Locale: Boston–Cambridge, Massachusetts, United States
- Maintained by: MassDOT
- ID number: B160124EYDOTNBI

Characteristics
- Design: Haunched girder bridge
- Material: Steel
- Total length: 2,164.8 ft (387.72 sm; 659.82 m) (roadway); 364.4 smoots ± one ear (620 m) (sidewalk from Storrow Drive to Cambridge only)
- Width: 69.3 ft (12.42 sm; 21.13 m) (total width); 52 ft (9.3 sm; 15.8 m) (roadway)
- No. of spans: 25
- Piers in water: 24
- Load limit: 86.4 short tons (78.4 t)
- Clearance below: 12 ft (2.2 sm; 3.7 m)

History
- Constructed by: Boston Bridge Works
- Construction start: 1887
- Construction end: 1891
- Opened: September 1, 1891; 135 years ago, 1990
- Closed: 1983 (temporary closure for repairs)

Statistics
- Daily traffic: 49,000 as of 2005

Location
- Interactive map of Harvard Bridge

Harvard Bridge, also known locally as the Massachusetts Avenue Bridge and "Mass. Ave." Bridge, is a steel haunched girder bridge carrying Massachusetts Avenue (Route 2A) over the Charles River and connecting Back Bay, Boston with Cambridge, Massachusetts. At 2,164.8 feet (387.72 sm; 659.82 m), it is the longest bridge over the Charles River.

After years of disagreement between the cities of Boston and Cambridge, the bridge was built jointly by the two cities between 1887 and 1891. It is named for John Harvard, the founder of Harvard University. Originally equipped with a central swing span, it was revised several times over the years until its superstructure was completely replaced in the late 1980s due to unacceptable vibration and the collapse of a similar bridge in Connecticut.

The bridge is known locally for being marked off in the idiosyncratic unit of length called the smoot.

== Conception ==
In 1874, the Massachusetts General Court authorized construction of a bridge between Boston and Cambridge, and in 1882 follow-up legislation set out its location.

The bridge was to have a draw with an opening of at least 38 feet (12 m; 6.8 sm). Boston interests opposed the bridge, mainly because it did not provide for an overhead crossing of the Grand Junction Branch of the Boston and Albany Railroad. Further legislation in 1885 changed the draw to a clear opening of at least 36 feet (11 m; 6.4 sm) and no more, until the other bridges below the proposed location were required to have a larger opening. There was still no substantive progress until 1887, when Cambridge petitioned the Legislature to compel Boston to proceed; the resulting act required each city pay half the cost, and allowed Boston to raise up to $250,000 (US$8,960,000 with inflation) for this purpose, in excess of its debt limit. This implied an estimated cost of US$500,000 (US$17,900,000 with inflation) for the bridge.

The Legislature provided for a bridge commission, to consist of the mayors of Boston and Cambridge plus a third commissioner to be appointed by the mayors. The mayors of Boston and Cambridge, Hugh O'Brien and William E. Russell, appointed Leander Greeley of Cambridge as the third commissioner, though this appointment changed over time.

Year(s)	Mayor of Boston	Mayor of Cambridge	Third Commissioner
1887–1888	Hugh O'Brien	William E. Russell	Leander Greeley
1889–1890	Thomas N. Hart	Henry H. Gilmore	Leander Greeley
1891	Nathan Matthews, Jr.	Alpheus B. Alger	Leander Greeley (died February 15, 1891 or February 16, 1891); George W. Gale

The commission's 1892 report claimed:

The effect that the bridge will have upon both cities is obvious. The low land and marshes on the Cambridge side, formerly almost valueless, have been filled in and have become valuable; and Cambridge is now connected with the choicest residential portions of Boston. The residents of the Back Bay, South End, Roxbury, and other southern sections of Boston are now connected directly, by way of West Chester park and the bridge, with Cambridge, Belmont, Arlington, and adjacent towns; and this thoroughfare in Boston, it is believed, will ultimately be the central one of the city.

=== Name ===
The bridge is named in honor of John Harvard, whose philanthropic gift was used to establish Harvard University. Other names suggested included Blaxton, Chester, Shawmut, and Longfellow. (Note: The structure now called the Longfellow Bridge opened 15 years later, originally called the Cambridge Bridge, was given its current name in 1927.)

== Engineering ==
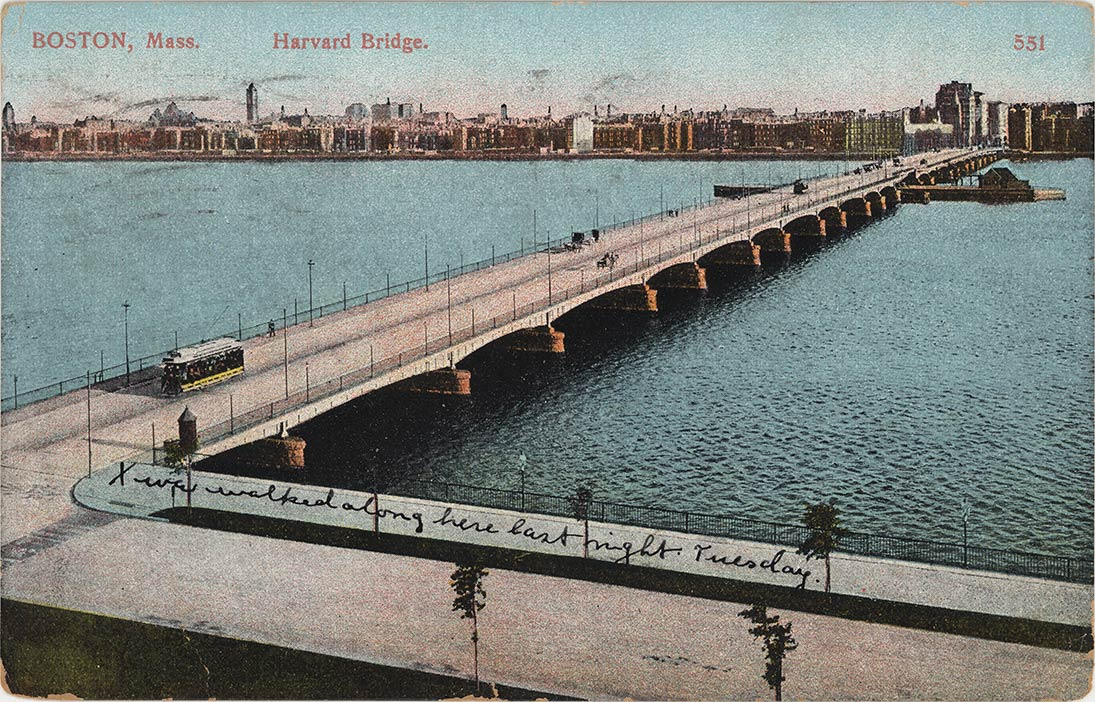
A postcard of Harvard Bridge looking toward Boston in 1910, from the roof of the Riverbank Court Hotel, which is now Maseeh Hall, a dormitory at the Massachusetts Institute of Technology

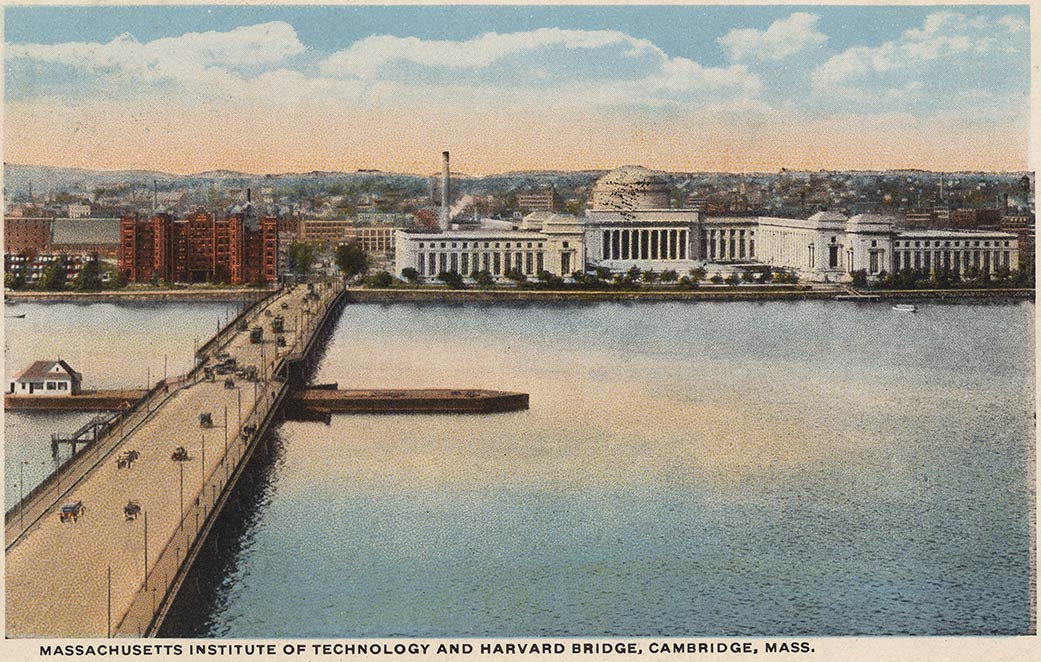
An early 20th century postcard of Harvard Bridge looking toward Cambridge and MIT

Originally projected as a wooden pile structure with stone pavement for the first 200 feet (61 m; 36 sm) (because the Charles River Embankment extension was expected to take that space) the design was changed to be entirely iron spans on stone piers. The general plans were approved on July 14, 1887. The engineers were William Jackson (Boston City Engineer), John E. Cheney (assistant Boston City Engineer), Samuel E. Tinkham (assistant engineer), and Nathan S. Brock (assistant engineer at bridge).

The subsurface conditions at the bridge location are extreme. Much of Boston is underlain with clay, but the situation at the bridge is exacerbated by a fault which roughly follows the path of the Charles River itself. From a depth of approximately 200 to 300 feet (60 to 90 m; 40 to 50 sm) below existing ground, is a very dense till composed of gravel and boulders with a silt-clay matrix. Above that to approximately 30 feet (9 m; 5 sm) below the surface is Boston blue clay (BBC). Over this are thin layers of sand, gravel, and fill. The BBC is overconsolidated up to a depth of approximately 70 feet (20 m; 10 sm).

The substructure originally consisted of two masonry abutments and twenty-three masonry piers, as well as one pile foundation with a fender pier for the draw span. The superstructure was originally twenty-three cantilevered fixed spans and suspended spans, of plate girders with one swing span. The Boston abutment rests on vertical piles, while the Cambridge end is directly on gravel.

Originally, the bridge was built across the Charles River connecting West Chester Park, in Boston, with Front Street, in Cambridge. This is now called Massachusetts Avenue on both sides of the river. As originally built, the total length between centers of bearings on abutments was 2,164 feet 9 inches (659.82 m; 387.72 sm) with a draw 48 feet 4 inches (14.73 m; 8.66 sm) wide between centers. The width of the bridge was 69 feet 4 inches (21.13 m; 12.42 sm) except near and on the draw.

The bridge as built was composed of fixed and suspended spans roughly 75 feet (23 m; 13.4 sm) long and piers 90 feet (27 m; 16 sm) apart, center to center. The span lengths alternated between 75 and 105 feet (23 and 32 m; 13.4 and 18.8 sm). The longer spans were cantilevered, while the shorter spans were suspended between the cantilevers.

The original roadway contained two lanes for horse-drawn vehicles and two street car tracks, for a total width of 51.0 feet (15.5 m; 9.13 sm). There were also two 9-foot-2-inch (2.79 m; 1.64 sm) sidewalks. The original roadway and sidewalk stringers were of wood, with an approximately 1.25-inch (32 mm; 0.0187 sm) thick covering of asphalt on the sidewalk and a 2-inch (51 mm; 0.030 sm) spruce wearing surface on the roadway.

The exception was at the swing span, which was 48 feet (15 m; 8.6 sm) wide. This span was approximately 149 feet (45 m; 26.7 sm) long, and sat on a wooden pier. It was a double-cantilevered, electrically-driven structure also carrying a bridge caretaker's house.

The bridge opened on September 1, 1891. The original cost of construction was $511,000, $18,310,000 in current dollars.

== Maintenance and events ==
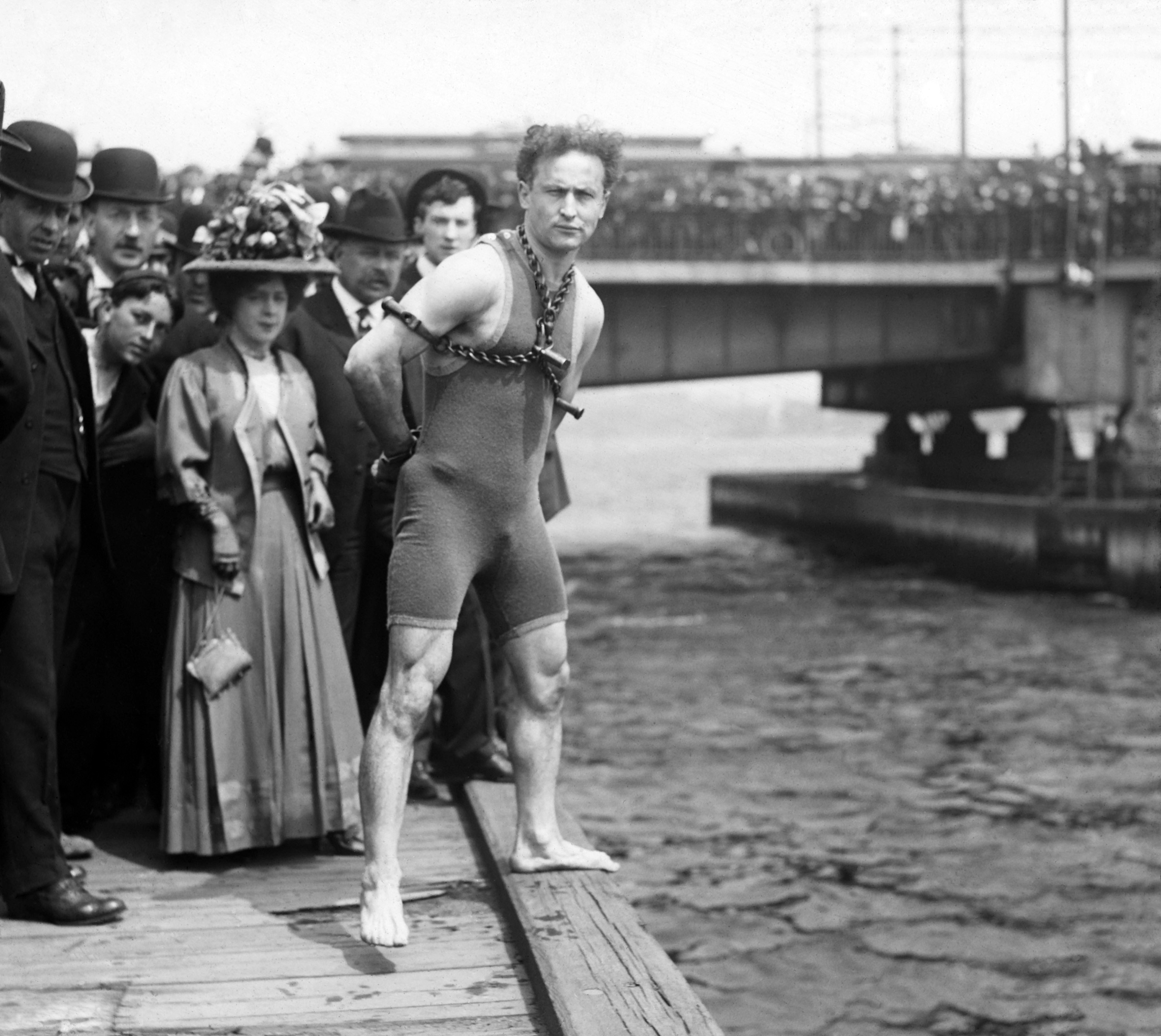
Harry Houdini, who jumped from the bridge in 1908

In 1898, 3-foot-wide (0.91 m; 0.54 sm) bicycle lanes were installed next to each curb. In 2011 (113 years later), the City of Boston finally connected these lanes to its own bike lanes.

A marker near the southeast end of the bridge memorializes one of Harry Houdini's "well known escapes", during which he jumped from the bridge on May 1, 1908. (Other sources give the date as April 30, 1908.)

The bridge was declared unsafe in 1909, requiring all of the iron and steel to be replaced. The draw was elevated slightly and the trolley rails were replaced as well.

When the Metropolitan District Commission (MDC) took control of the bridge in 1924, they rebuilt much of the bridge superstructure. They replaced the wooden stringers with steel "I" beams, topped wooden deck elements with concrete and brick, and replaced the street car rails. Structural steel hangers replaced wrought iron. The swing span was converted into two 75-foot (23 m; 13.4 sm) fixed spans the same width as the rest of the bridge. The wooden pier was heavily modified with concrete and stone to make it resemble the other piers, increasing the number of stone piers from 23 to 24.

Heavy traffic at the Mass Ave and Memorial Drive intersection on the Cambridge end of the bridge led to the construction of an underpass in 1931.

The bridge was formerly referred to as the "Xylophone Bridge" because of the sound its wooden decking made when traffic traveled over it. This decking was replaced in 1949 with 3-inch (76 mm; 0.045 sm) concrete-filled "I-beam lok" grating topped with a 2.25-inch (57 mm; 0.0336 sm) thick bituminous wearing surface. At this time, all bearings were replaced, and the trolley car tracks were removed, as were granite blocks. The trolley car poles were reused for street lights. Ramps between the bridge and the under-construction Storrow Drive were added.

The 1924 sidewalk slabs were replaced by precast, prestressed slabs in 1962. The fifteen expansion dams were replaced or repaired in 1969.

=== Engineering study, 1971–1972 ===
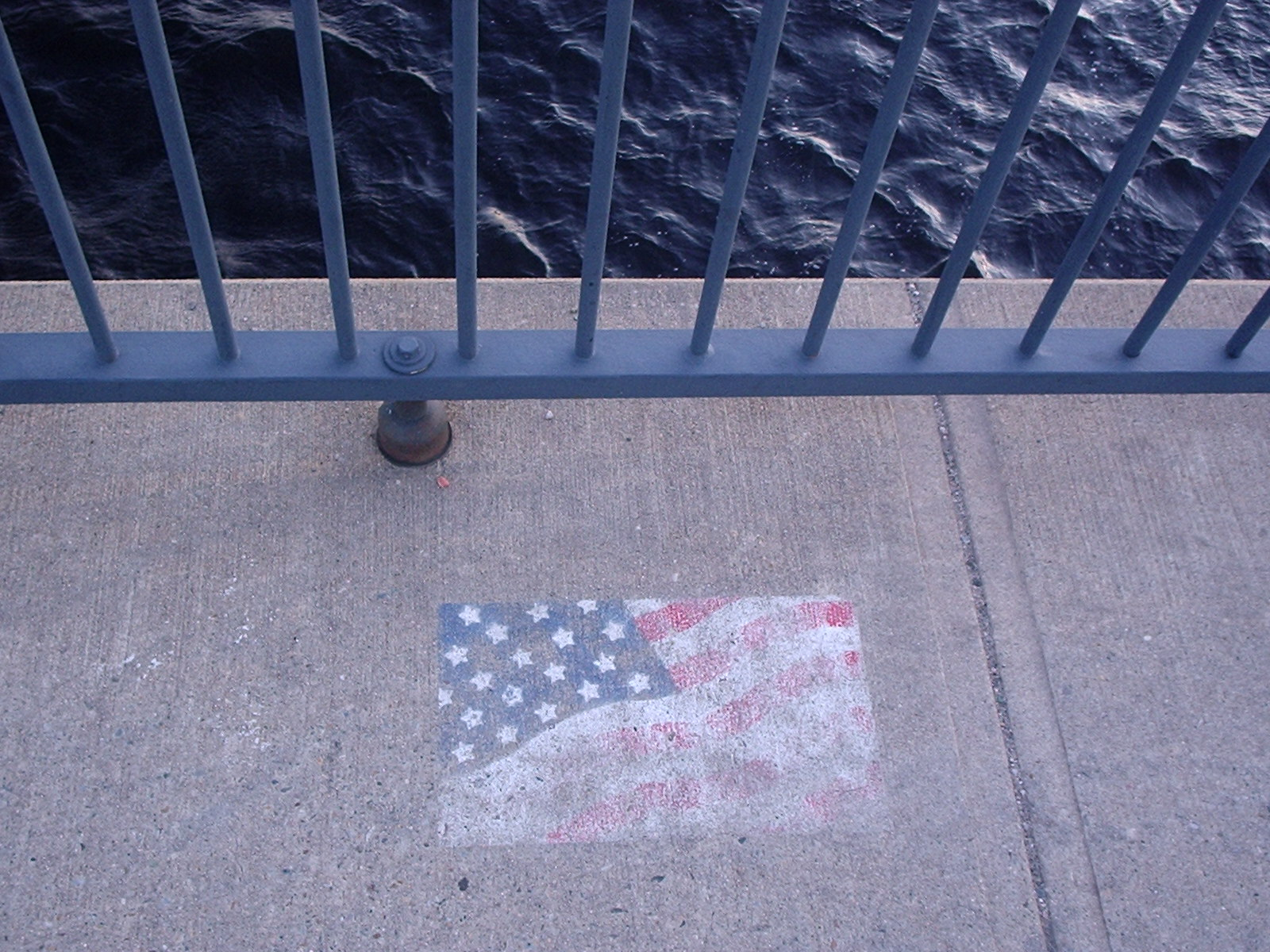
Harvard Bridge is decorated with both serious and whimsical works of art.

An engineering study was performed by the Metropolitan District Commission (later merged into the Department of Conservation and Recreation) in 1971–1972 due to complaints by bridge users of excessive vibration. The bridge was found to be understrength for its load. Before the final study was complete, the recommendation was to place a load limit of 8 short tons (7.3 t) per axle and a total of 15 short tons (14 t) per vehicle, or to restrict trucks to the interior lanes, where the bridge was stronger. A 25-short-ton (23 t) limit was imposed.

Suggestions made included strengthening the existing structure by adding either struts or plates to make the existing four beams along the length of the bridge into a stiffening truss, or to replace the superstructure with a new one, made of either steel or concrete, which would be up to current standards. The recommendation was to replace the superstructure with one weighing approximately the same in order to reuse the piers, which were in good condition.

The reasoning was that the cost of a new structure could be predicted much more easily than the cost of repairing and reinforcing the existing bridge. The resulting new bridge would be of known materials and quality, such as ductile structural steel rather than brittle wrought iron, and rated at AASHO HS-20. Repairing the existing structure would leave old wrought iron of uncertain quality and condition standing, and would not bring the design up to (then) current standards. Detailed engineering calculations were included. The price was estimated at US$2.5 million to US$3 million (US$19,000,000 to US$23,000,000 with inflation).

The action taken based on this study was to establish load restrictions on the bridge, 15 short tons (14 t) in the outer lanes, 25 short tons (23 t) on the inner lanes. This was expanded in 1979 to a flat limit of 15 short tons (14 t) on the whole bridge.

=== Superstructure replacement, 1980s ===
After the failure of the Mianus River Bridge at Greenwich, Connecticut in 1983, the Harvard Bridge was shut down and inspected because it contained similar elements, specifically the suspended spans. Traffic was restricted to the inner two lanes due to the discovery of two failed hangers on span 14. A few days later, all trucks and buses were banned from the bridge.

In 1986, a report was published containing the plan to replace the superstructure on the existing supports. Alternatives considered were very similar to the 1972 report, and were similarly decided. Structural modifications included an upgrade from four longitudinal girders to six of the same shape and replacement of a stairway with a handicapped pedestrian ramp on the Boston end of the bridge.

Ramp "B", from southbound (Boston bound) bridge lanes to eastbound Storrow Drive, caused traffic to merge onto Storrow Drive from the left (high speed) lanes using a short acceleration lane, causing safety issues. The MDC requested elimination of this ramp. Compared to overall bridge traffic of 30,000 vehicles per day, traffic on ramp B was found to be low, approximately 1,500 vehicles per day with a peak of 120 vehicles per hour.

The historic value of the bridge was considered significant, so the plan was to make the replacement superstructure appear similar, with similar railing and lighting. In order to document the pre-existing structure, a Historic American Engineering Record (HAER) would be prepared.

Pier 12 was exhibiting inappropriate movement and was scheduled for reinforcement.

The work would be done in two phases. Phase 1 would reinforce the downstream side of the bridge to allow MBTA bus traffic, and was expected to take 5 months. Most of this effort would be spent on the underside of the bridge and would not affect existing traffic. Phase 2 would replace the entire superstructure and was expected to take three construction seasons to implement. Cost was estimated to be US$20M (US$59,000,000 with inflation). Phase 1 finished in 1987, and Phase 2 in 1990.

Before-and-after images

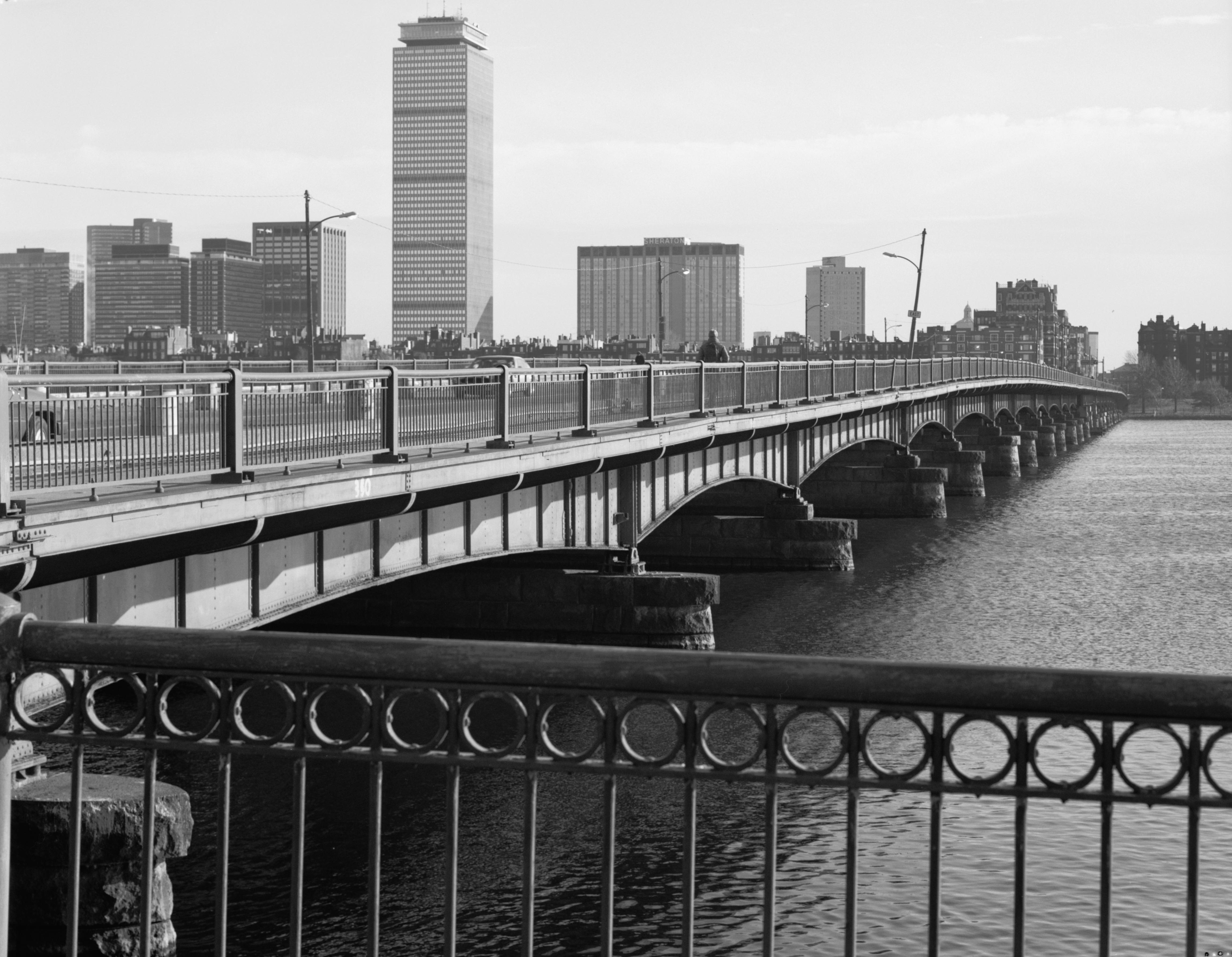
Bridge viewed from the upstream Cambridge side in 1985. Construction barrels restricting traffic from the outside lanes, and general wear and tear are visible (click on image to enlarge)

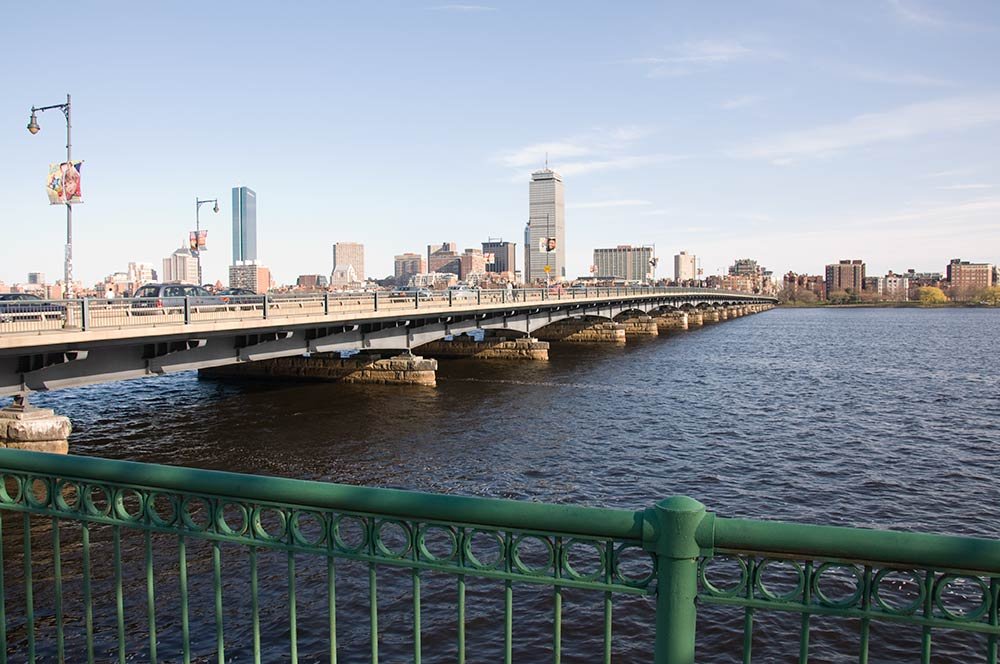
Roughly the same view, in 2009. Superstructure is in much better shape only 20 years after completion, than the 1985 superstructure was roughly 40 years after its most recent major work.
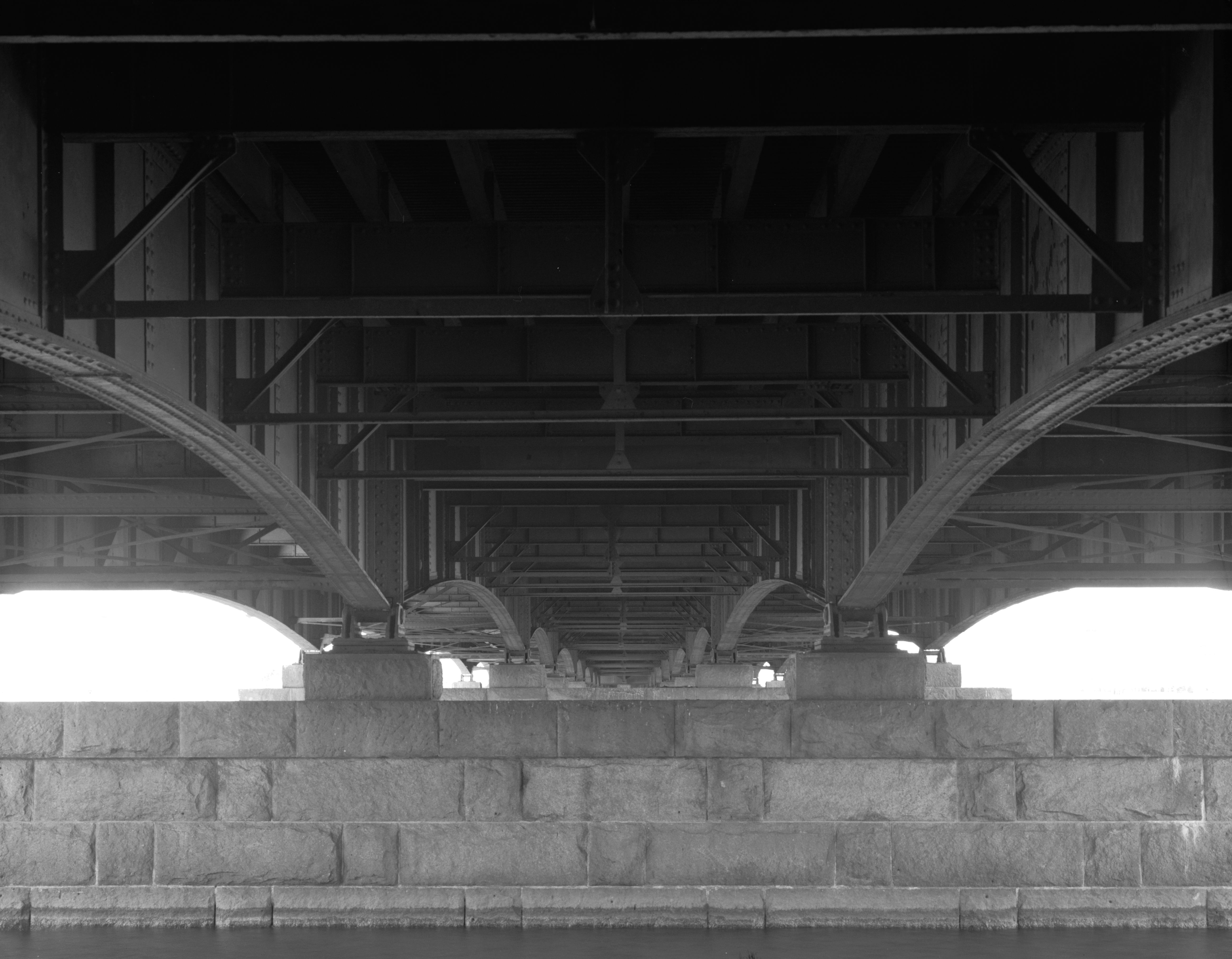
Underside of the bridge in 1985. Image shows how the bridge was originally built, and later modified, but before the superstructure was replaced.

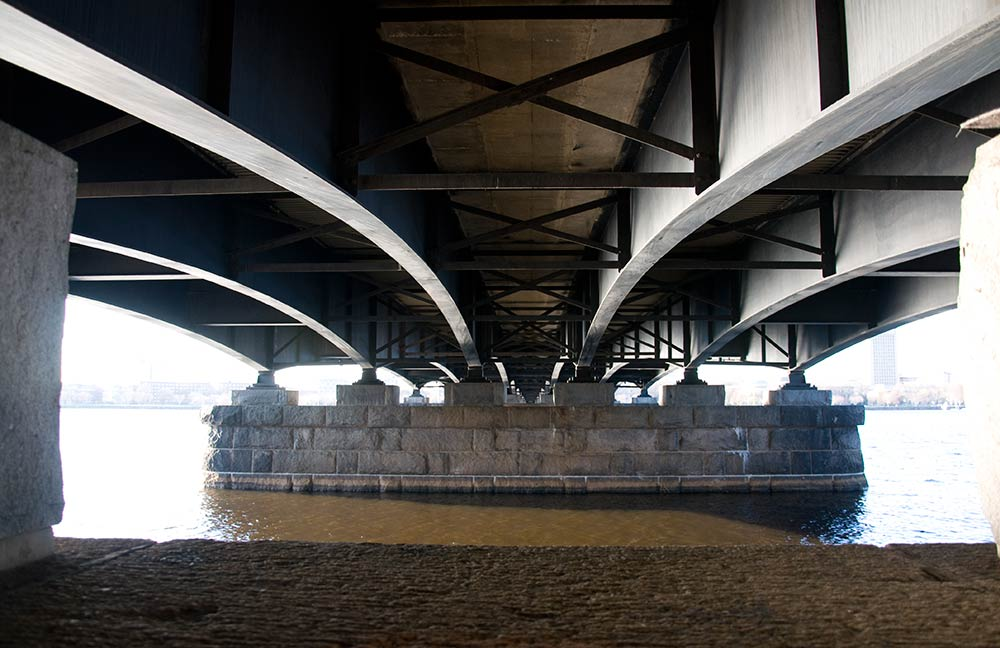
Underside of the bridge in 2009. Image shows how the replacement superstructure was built, with six longitudinal girders, different bracing, etc.

=== Subsequent events ===
In the fall of 2014, the Charles River Conservancy announced that an anonymous donor would fund an upgrade of the street lights for both the roadway and both sidewalks on the bridge. The new roadway and aesthetic lighting was installed in 2015, highlighting the smoot marks along the sidewalk. The design was selected after a competition won by Miguel Rosales of Rosales + Partners. The light posts were located 30 smoots (167.5 ft; 51.05 m) apart. "It will provide safe lighting for pedestrians and drivers, and the elements of design on the bridge will be pulled out and emphasized. It will become a really beautiful bridge," said Renata von Tscharner, founder and president of the Charles River Conservancy.

=== Separated bicycle lanes ===
In November 2021, to improve bicycle safety, MassDOT initiated a separated bicycle lane pilot on the Harvard by placing cones to create two wide bicycle lanes. This reduced general purpose lanes from four to two over the bridge. Despite some hiccups involving vandalism, when multiple persons were captured on surveillance damaging bike lane infrastructure and throwing it into the river below; the pilot was deemed a success in the Fall 2022. MassDOT went on to hire Toole Design Group to engineer flex-post separated bicycle lanes, bus priority lanes, and new traffic signal phasing for the corridor. These changes were implemented just before 2023, and have been in place since. To this date, the Harvard Bridge remains one of the most popular cycling routes in New England, with an average of over 1,000 bicyclists in each direction per day.

== Smoots ==
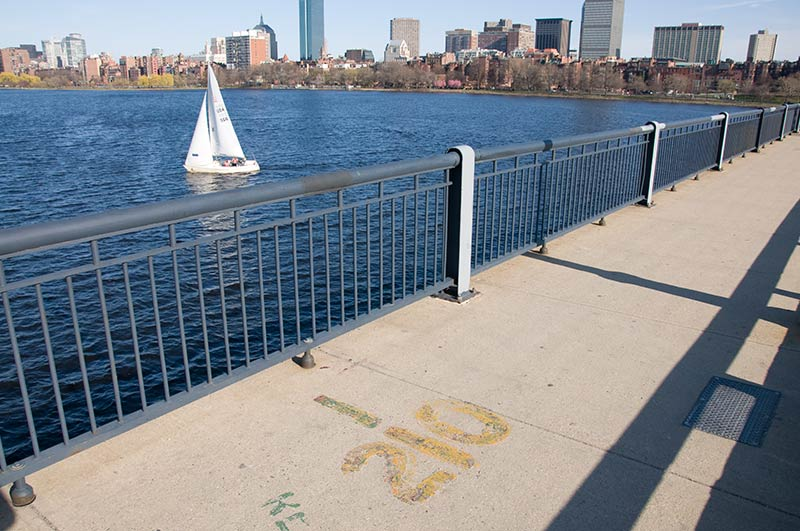
Smoot mark 210 on the eastside of the bridge

The Harvard Bridge is marked off in an idiosyncratic unit of measure, the smoot.

In 1958, members of the Lambda Chi Alpha fraternity at MIT measured the bridge's eastern sidewalk by using that year's shortest pledge, Oliver Smoot‍—‌nominally, 5 feet 7 inches (1.70 m) tall‍—‌as a measuring stick. Years after this stunt, Smoot became president of the American National Standards Institute (ANSI), and later president of the International Organization for Standardization (ISO).

Markers painted at 10-smoot (55.83 ft; 17.02 m) intervals give the bridge's length 364.4 smoots long, "plus one ear". Originally this read "plus or minus one ear"‍—‌representing measurement uncertainty‍—‌but over the years the words "or minus" disappeared. The marks are repainted periodically by members of the fraternity‍—‌originally surreptitiously and later openly.

During the major reconstruction in the 1980s, the new sidewalks were divided into smoot-length slabs rather than the standard six feet, and the smoot markings were painted on the new deck. Officials' original determination to omit the smoot markings from the reconstructed bridge, and to scrupulously prevent the fraternity from repainting them, evaporated when it was realized that police routinely used the smoot marks as reference points in accident reports.

The nominal length of 364.4 smoots (from two designated points at the bridge's ends) corresponds to about 2030 feet or 620 m, somewhat less than the bridge's published length of 2,170 feet; 390 smoots (660 m). A possible cause is that in 1958, there were ramps to Storrow Drive on both sides of the bridge, which interrupted the sidewalk earlier than it extends today. A bridge of 2,164.8 feet (659.82 m) corresponds to 387.7 smoots ± one ear.

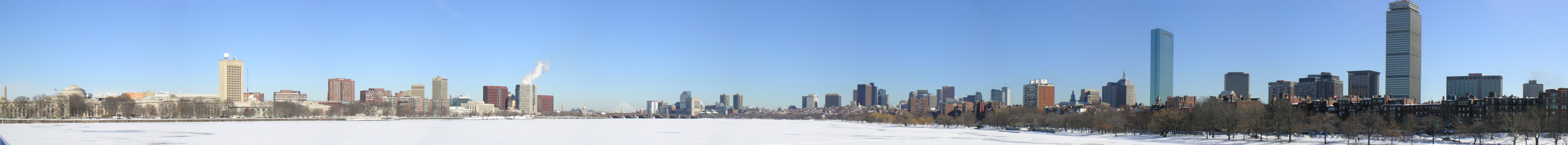
Panoramic view from Harvard Bridge in the winter, looking east (downstream), with the Cambridge shore on the left and the Boston shore on the right. The Longfellow Bridge is in the middle of the image, far downstream, with the triangular Zakim Bridge further behind it.

== See also ==
- List of bridges documented by the Historic American Engineering Record in Massachusetts
- List of crossings of the Charles River
