= Summer Glau =

American actress (born 1981)

- Glau at Dragon Con in 2026
- Born: July 24, 1981 (age 45); San Antonio, Texas, U.S.
- Occupations: Actress, ballet dancer, model, podcaster
- Years active: 2002–present
- Height: 5 ft 7 in (1.70 m)
- Spouse: Val Morrison (m. 2014)
- Children: 2

Summer Glau (/ɡlaʊ/; born July 24, 1981) is an American actress best known for her roles in science fiction and fantasy television series: as River Tam in Firefly (2002) and its continuation film Serenity (2005), as Tess Doerner in The 4400 (2005–2007), as Cameron in Terminator: The Sarah Connor Chronicles (2008–2009), and as Isabel Rochev / Ravager in Arrow (2013–2014).

== Early life ==
Glau was born in San Antonio, Texas, where she grew up with her two younger sisters Kaitlin and Christie. She is of Ulster-Scots and German ancestry.

Glau received a scholarship to a ballet company and was homeschooled from grades 3 to 12 to accommodate her ballet training. In addition to her classical ballet training, she has studied tango and flamenco.

== Career ==
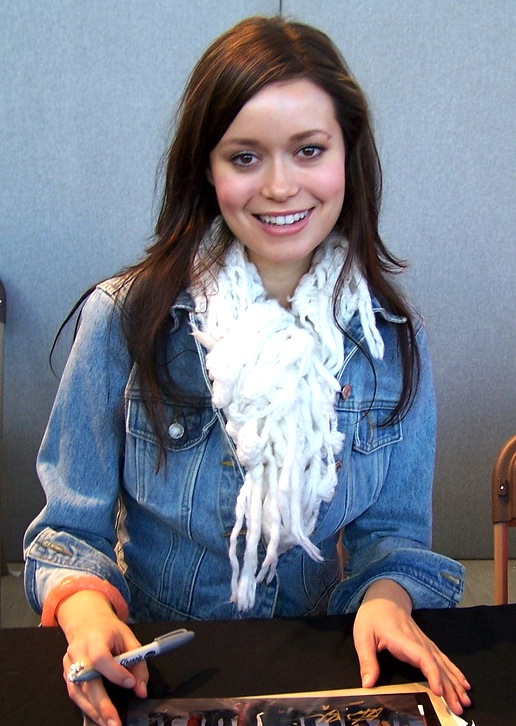
Glau at CollectorMania 2005

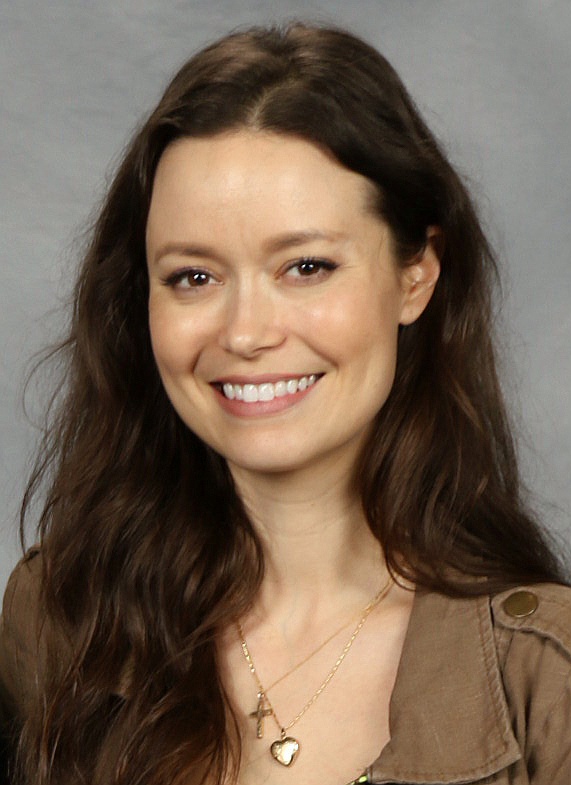
Glau at Paradise City Comic Con, December 2016

=== Early career: 2002–2008 ===
Glau's first television credit was a guest role on a 2002 episode of the television series Angel. In the episode, she was a prima ballerina who danced the titular character Giselle by Adolphe Adam.

Having met director Joss Whedon on Angel, Glau was later cast in Whedon's series Firefly as River Tam, a role she later reprised for the show's feature film sequel Serenity. Her portrayal of River Tam, a girl who was intellectually gifted but mentally unstable due to being subject to government experimentation to create an assassins program, was widely praised and garnered her a Saturn Award for Best Supporting Actress in 2006. For her fight scenes in Serenity, she underwent 6 months of rigorous wushu training in Alhambra. In an interview, Glau indicated having previously auditioned for the role of a Power Ranger (White Wild Force Ranger Alyssa Enrilé) in Power Rangers Wild Force but lost to actress Jessica Rey before meeting Whedon.

After Serenity, Glau appeared on the episode "Love Conquers Al" of the TV series Cold Case. She had a small role in the film Sleepover, in which she played the high school senior Shelly. She also appeared in the CSI: Crime Scene Investigation episode "What's Eating Gilbert Grissom?", and Season 2 of The Unit as Crystal Burns (the girlfriend of Jeremy Erhart from Michigan).

In 2006, Glau played Tess Doerner, a paranoid schizophrenic returnee in Season 2's premiere of The 4400, and became a recurring character from Season 3 onwards. She also starred in the horror comedy film Mammoth and was cast in the ABC Family TV movie The Initiation of Sarah.

In Terminator: The Sarah Connor Chronicles, a series that debuted in early 2008, Glau played the role of Cameron Phillips, a reprogrammed Terminator infiltration unit sent back by future John Connor to protect John's younger self and his mother Sarah Connor from Skynet. The series' seventh episode, "The Demon Hand", featured several scenes in which Glau (in character as Cameron) dances ballet, including one set to Chopin's Nocturne in C# Minor. Glau also played Allison Young (Cameron's human doppelgänger) in the second-season episodes "Allison from Palmdale" and "Born to Run". In 2008, she won the Saturn Award for Best Supporting Actress on Television for her portrayal of Cameron.

=== 2009–present ===
In 2009, Glau guest starred as herself in Episode 17 of Season 2, The Terminator Decoupling, of the CBS situation comedy The Big Bang Theory. In the episode, she encounters Sheldon, Leonard, Howard and Raj during a train ride from Los Angeles to San Francisco where they are going to attend a conference. During the ride Leonard, Howard and Raj squabble about approaching her. Raj does so and seems to attract her interest until he discovers that the beer he is drinking for Dutch courage is non-alcoholic.

On August 26, 2009, Glau joined the cast of Joss Whedon's Dollhouse for four episodes in Season 2. She portrayed Bennett, the programmer for a rival Dollhouse. She also portrayed the protagonist Lindsey in the 2010 film Deadly Honeymoon and supporting character Maggie in the 2011 film The Legend of Hell's Gate: An American Conspiracy, which was filmed close to her residence in Boerne, Texas. She also guest starred as Greta in a 2010 episode of the TV series Chuck, reuniting with her Firefly co-star Adam Baldwin.

In 2011, Glau portrayed the leading role of Orwell in NBC's The Cape, a mysterious blogger who assisted the main character in crime fighting activities. On July 11, 2011, Glau was cast on Alphas as Skylar Adams, a recurring alpha with outstanding intellectual ability and mother to Zoe Adams, and a former acquaintance of Dr. Rosen and Nina. Moreover, she voiced Kara Zor-El in the DC Comics original animated movie Superman/Batman: Apocalypse.

In 2012, Glau played the main character Christine in the Hallmark film Help for the Holidays, an elf who went on a special assignment to help a family regain their Christmas spirit. In 2013, Glau was a female lead in the horror comedy film Knights of Badassdom, in which she took up larping. During this time, she also had minor guest appearances on the TV series Grey's Anatomy and Hawaii Five-0.

In the CW superhero series Arrow, Glau portrayed the recurring antagonist Isabel Rochev (Ravager) in its second season in 2013. She also guest starred as Olivia Frampton in Season 2 of the black comedy series NTSF:SD:SUV::.

In 2014, Glau appeared in all 12 episodes of the TV series Sequestered, portraying a juror who seemed to have been involuntarily brought into larger conspiracy.

Glau rejoined her Firefly co-star Nathan Fillion when she guest starred in the web series Con Man (2015) as Martina and in Castle as Kendall Frost, an aspiring private detective who rivaled Fillion's protagonist.

In 2018–2019, Glau was cast in the recurring role of Miss Jones on the Netflix crime drama series Wu Assassins. She also provided narration in the Realm audio podcast Ctrl-Alt-Destroy, in which the protagonist was a video game designer who discovers that the game she created has been stolen as part of a top secret project.

Glau has also been featured in the short films Inside the Box and Dead End, as well as in the web series Jeff 1000 (portraying herself as the friend of a robot named Jeff) and The Human Preservation Project.

== Personal life ==
Since 2014, Glau has been married to Val Morrison, whom she met on the set of Hawaii Five-0. In January 2015, Glau gave birth to her first daughter. She gave birth to her second daughter in October 2017.

Glau is a Christian who was raised Baptist but regularly attended a Catholic church, about which she stated: "It has always given me great strength to go to this church."

Outside of film and TV, Glau has participated in a wide variety of comic conventions across the United States and the world. She has also been an advocate for the science fiction fan community, such as through a promotional video for the Los Angeles Sci-fi World (opened in 2024). She has also supported wind energy in the 175th Anniversary of the Texas Revolution video series directed by Michael Cerny.

In an interview from 2012, Glau has mentioned that one of her favorite films during childhood was Camelot, and that she would be interested in acting in period pieces, such as in those written by Jane Austen.

== Filmography ==
=== Film ===
Year	Title	Role	Notes
2004	Sleepover	Ticket girl	
2005	Serenity	River Tam	
2006	Mammoth	Jack Abernathy	Television film (Syfy)
2006	The Initiation of Sarah	Lindsey Goodwin	Television film (ABC Family)
2010	Superman/Batman: Apocalypse	Kara Zor-El / Supergirl	Voice, direct-to-video
2010	Deadly Honeymoon	Lindsey Ross Forrest	Television film (Lifetime Movies)
2011	The Legend of Hell's Gate: An American Conspiracy	Maggie Moon	
2012	Help for the Holidays	Christine Prancer	Television film (Hallmark)
2013	Knights of Badassdom	Gwen	
2015	Dead End	Franck's wife & Fugitive	Short film

=== Television ===
Year	Title	Role	Notes
2002	Angel	Prima Ballerina	Episode: "Waiting in the Wings"
2002–2003	Firefly	River Tam	14 episodes
2003	Cold Case	Paige Pratt	Episode: "Love Conquers Al"
2004	CSI: Crime Scene Investigation	Mandy Cooper	Episode: "What's Eating Gilbert Grissom?"
2005–2007	The 4400	Tess Doerner	8 episodes
2006–2007	The Unit	Crystal Burns	7 episodes
2008–2009	Terminator: The Sarah Connor Chronicles	Cameron / Allison Young	31 episodes (as Cameron), 2 episodes (as Allison Young)
2009	The Big Bang Theory	Herself	Episode: "The Terminator Decoupling"
2009–2010	Dollhouse	Bennett Halverson	4 episodes
2010	Chuck	Greta	Episode: "Chuck Versus the Fear of Death"
2010	Good Morning Rabbit	Lucy	1 episode
2011	The Cape	Jamie Fleming / Orwell	10 episodes
2011–2012	Alphas	Skylar Adams	4 episodes
2012	Grey's Anatomy	Emily Kovach	2 episodes
2012	Scent of the Missing	Sedona	Pilot
2013	Hawaii Five-0	Maggie Hoapili	Episode: "Kekoa"
2013	NTSF:SD:SUV::	Olivia Frampton	Episode: "Comic-Con Air"
2013–2014	Arrow	Isabel Rochev / Ravager	9 episodes
2014	Peter Panzerfaust	Wendy	Voice
2014	Sequestered	Anna Brandt	12 episodes
2014	Jeff 1000	Herself	3 episodes
2015	Con Man	Make-up Lady / Martina	2 episodes
2016	Castle	Kendall Frost	Episode: "The G.D.S."
2019	Wu Assassins	Miss Jones (The Water Wu)	2 episodes
TBA	Firefly: The Animated Series	River Tam (voice)	Main role

=== Online media ===
Year	Title	Role	Notes
2005	R. Tam Sessions	River Tam	5 short videos
2021	Ctrl Alt Destroy	Narrator and all characters	Literary RPG podcast

== Awards and nominations ==
Year	Award	Category	Production	Result
2005	SFX Award	Best Actress	Serenity	Won
2006	SyFy Genre Awards	Best Actress/Movie	Serenity	Nominated
2006	Saturn Award	Best Supporting Actress	Serenity	Won
2008	Saturn Award	Best Supporting Actress on Television	Terminator: The Sarah Connor Chronicles	Won (tied with Elizabeth Mitchell)
2008	Scream Award	Best Actress in a Science Fiction Movie or TV Show	Terminator: The Sarah Connor Chronicles	Nominated
2008	Teen Choice Award	Choice TV Actress: Action Adventure	Terminator: The Sarah Connor Chronicles	Nominated
2008	Teen Choice Award	Choice TV Breakout Female Star	Terminator: The Sarah Connor Chronicles	Nominated
2009	Saturn Award	Best Supporting Actress on Television	Terminator: The Sarah Connor Chronicles	Nominated
2009	Teen Choice Award	Choice TV Actress: Action Adventure	Terminator: The Sarah Connor Chronicles	Nominated
