= Smoots, Virginia =

Unincorporated community in Virginia, United States

Coordinates: 38°01′00″N 77°16′42″W

Smoots is an unincorporated community in Caroline County, in the U.S. state of Virginia.
