= Oliver R. Smoot =

American academic (born 1940)

Oliver Reed Smoot Jr.
- Born: Oliver Reed Smoot Jr. August 24, 1940 (age 86); Bexar County, Texas, U.S.
- Education: Massachusetts Institute of Technology (BS); Georgetown University (JD)
- Occupation: Expert witness
- Known for: Unit of measurement known as a smoot
- Height: 5 ft 7 in (1 smoot)
- Spouse: Sandra Smoot
- Children: 2
- Relatives: Reed Smoot (distant relative); George Smoot (distant relative)

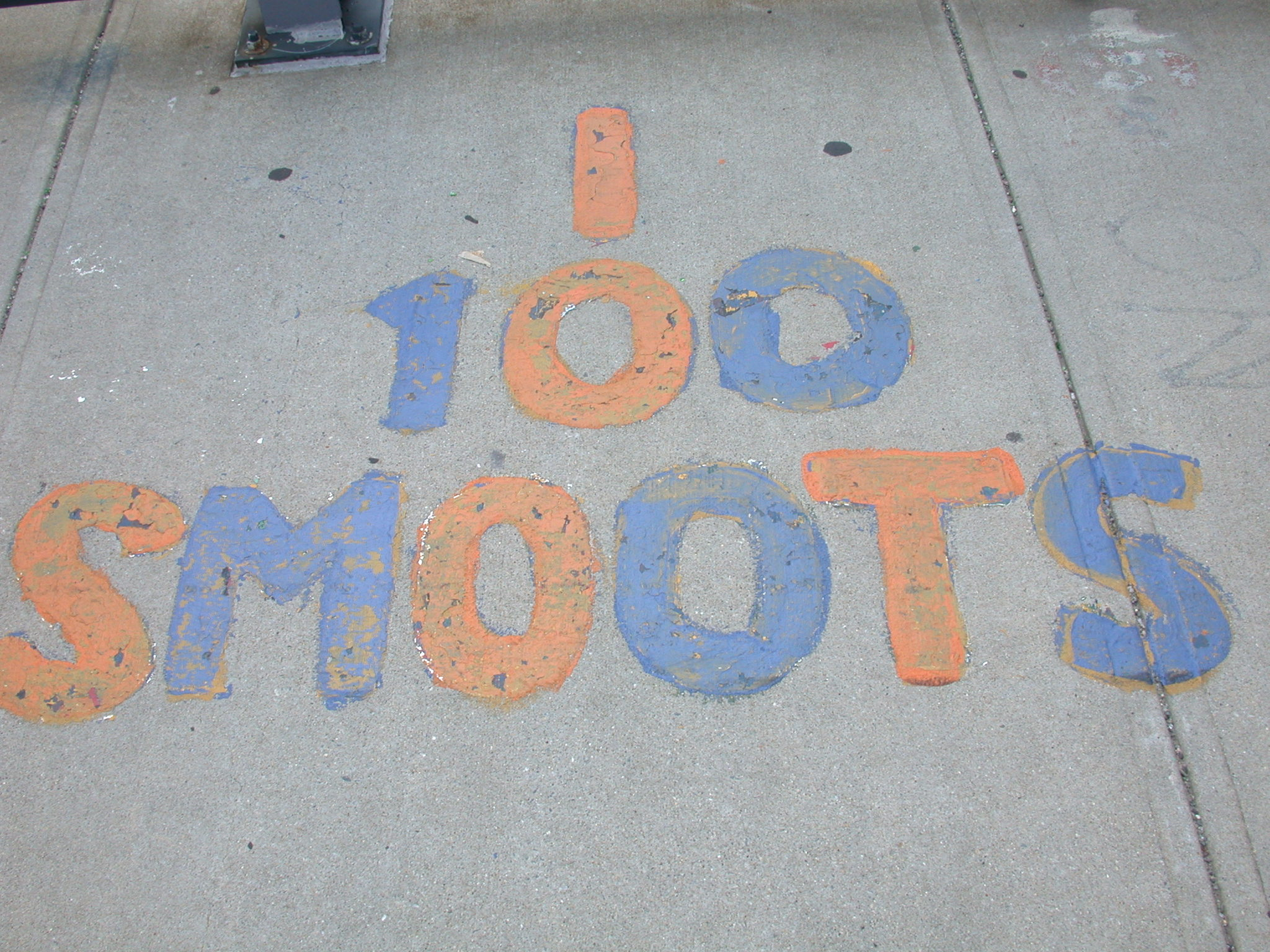
100-Smoot marking on Harvard Bridge

Oliver Reed Smoot Jr. (born August 24, 1940) is an American academic. He was a former chairman of the American National Standards Institute (ANSI) from 2001 to 2002 and president of the International Organization for Standardization (ISO) from 2003 to 2004.

In 2011, American Heritage Dictionary admitted his decapitalized surname, smoot, meaning a distance of 5 feet 7 inches (1.70 m), as one of the 10,000 new words added to their fifth edition. The term is named for Smoot from his undergraduate days when he was used as a unit of measurement on the Harvard Bridge at MIT during a fraternity pledge activity. The bridge measures 364.4 smoots.

== Early life and education ==
Smoot was born August 24, 1940, in Bexar County, Texas. He attended MIT in Cambridge, Massachusetts, where he was a member of Lambda Chi Alpha fraternity and obtained a Bachelor of Science in 1962. He then attended Georgetown University Law Center in Washington, D.C., where he obtained his JD.

== Career ==
From 2000–2005, he served as vice president for external voluntary standards relations of the Information Technology Industry Council (ITI). Prior to that, he was ITI's executive vice president for 23 years.

Smoot gave a speech to a hearing of the U.S. House Committee on Science, Space, and Technology's Subcommittee on Technology on March 20, 2000, titled "The Role of Technical Standards in Today's Society and in the Future".

He returned to MIT on October 4, 2008, for a 50th anniversary celebration, including the installation of a plaque on the bridge. Smoot was also presented with an official unit of measurement: a smoot stick. On May 7, 2016, he served as the grand marshal of the parade marking the centenary of MIT's moving from Boston's Back Bay into Cambridge.

== Personal life ==
Smoot lives in San Diego with his spouse Sandra Smoot. He is also a representative of the MIT Education Council. He has a son and daughter, both of whom also attended MIT.

Smoot is a distant relative of Senator Reed Smoot and of Nobel Prize in Physics winner George Smoot.
