= The Terminator Decoupling =

- The Big Bang Theory episode
- Episode no.: Season 2 Episode 17
- Directed by: Mark Cendrowski
- Story by: Bill Prady &; Dave Goetsch
- Teleplay by: Tim Doyle &; Stephen Engel
- Original air date: March 9, 2009

Guest appearances
- Summer Glau as herself; George Smoot as himself

Episode chronology
← Previous "The Cushion Saturation"	Next → "The Work Song Nanocluster"
- The Big Bang Theory season 2

"The Terminator Decoupling" is an episode of the American comedy television series The Big Bang Theory. It first aired on CBS in the United States on March 9, 2009. It is the seventeenth episode of the second season of the series and the thirty-fourth episode overall. The episode features guest appearances by actress Summer Glau and cosmologist George Smoot.

== Plot ==
Leonard, Sheldon, Howard and Raj are heading to San Francisco to attend a conference, where cosmologist George Smoot is giving a keynote address. On Sheldon's insistence, they travel on the Coast Starlight train, finding that actress Summer Glau (played by herself) is onboard. Raj and Howard argue over who should approach her first. With Raj unable to talk to women except when under the influence of alcohol, he goes to buy some from the catering car. As Howard is trying to figure out the best opening line, Raj swoops in and starts talking with Summer (even using the same line Howard planned to use: "It's hot in here, it must be Summer"). Their conversation is going very well until Howard points out to Raj that he is drinking non-alcoholic beer, its placebo effect fails, and Raj quickly departs the scene. Howard tries to strike a conversation but ends up annoying her. Finally he asks to have his picture with her to which she agrees until his advances annoy her again and she breaks his phone. Afterwards Leonard musters the courage to approach Summer, but she gets off the train as he is introducing himself.

During the train ride, Sheldon realizes that he has forgotten the flash drive containing the paper he wanted Smoot to read. Reluctantly, he resorts to asking Penny to enter his bedroom and locate his flash drive so she can email him the paper. When Sheldon eventually presents the paper to Smoot (appearing as himself) and proposes joint research on the subject, Smoot rejects his idea, much to Sheldon's chagrin.

== Production ==
George Smoot received the Nobel Prize in Physics in 2006 for his work which cemented the Big Bang theory. A fan of the series, he had written to the producers of the show and requested to appear on an episode. His scene was shot at the Warner Brothers Studios in Burbank, California on February 18, 2009.

Summer Glau also appeared as herself in the episode. Glau was part of the cast of Terminator: The Sarah Connor Chronicles which, along with The Big Bang Theory, was produced by Warner Bros. Television. Bill Prady, a co-creator of The Big Bang Theory, presented the script of the episode to Josh Friedman, creator of Terminator: The Sarah Connor Chronicles with the plan of casting Glau as herself. Friedman, impressed with the story, suggested it to Glau.

== Reception ==
On its first broadcast, the episode was watched by 9.46 million households, according to Nielsen ratings. The episode received a 3.6 rating/10 share among viewers aged between 18 and 49, and a 2.4 rating/8 share among viewers between 18 and 34.

The episode received modestly positive reviews. Noel Murray of The A.V. Club praised the writers for evenly including all the main characters in the episode. IGN's James Chamberlain found Glau's acting lacking emotion, remarking "it felt as though Cameron were on the show and not Summer". Alan Sepinwall from The Star-Ledger also remarked this episode as a balanced one for the cast ensemble.
