= Smoot =

Nonstandard, humorous unit of length

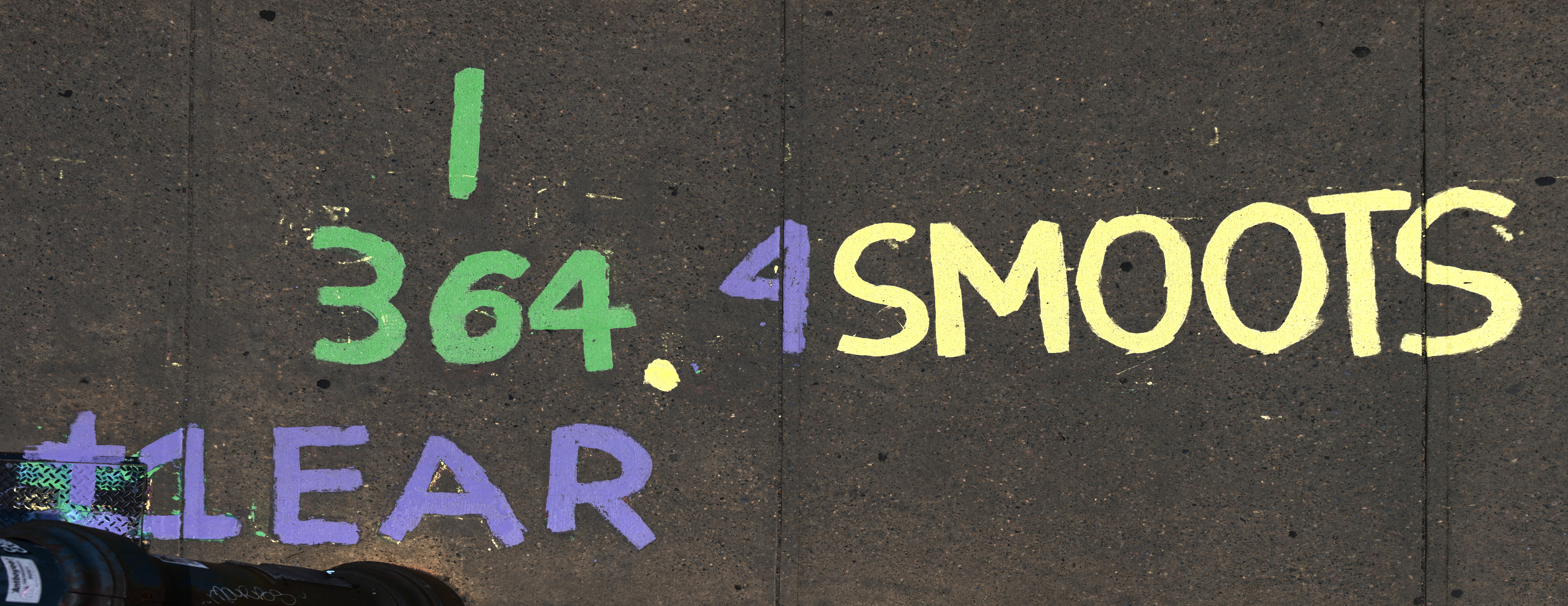
- "364.4 smoots ± 1 ear" painted on the Harvard Bridge sidewalk in Cambridge, Massachusetts

General information
- Named after: Oliver R. Smoot

Conversions
1 smoot in ...	... is equal to ...
- imperial/US units: 5 ft 7 in
- SI units: 1.7018 m

The smoot /ˈsmuːt/ is a nonstandard, humorous unit of length created as part of an MIT fraternity pledge to Lambda Chi Alpha by Oliver R. Smoot, who in October 1958 lay down repeatedly on the Harvard Bridge between Boston and Cambridge, Massachusetts, so that his fraternity brothers could use his height to measure the length of the bridge.

== Description ==
One smoot is equal to Oliver Smoot's height at the time of the pledge, 5 feet 7 inches (1.7018 m). The bridge's length was measured to be 364.4 smoots (2,035 ft; 620.1 m) "± 1 εar" with the "±" showing measurement uncertainty and "ear" spelled with an epsilon to further indicate possible error in the measurement. Over the years the "±" portion and "ε" spelling have been left out in many citations, including some markings at the site itself, but the "±" is recorded on a 50th-anniversary plaque at the end of the bridge.

== History ==
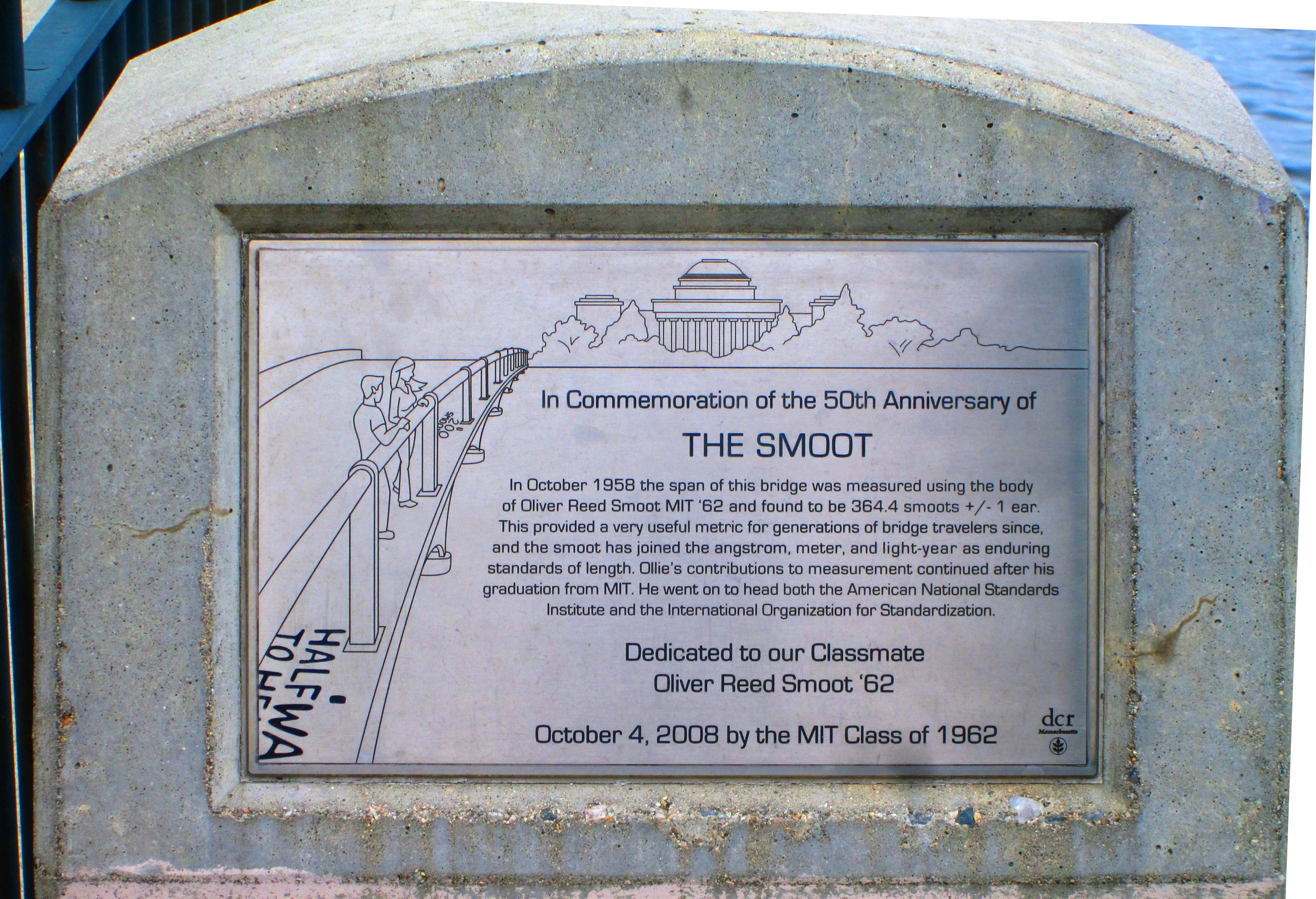
A plaque on Harvard Bridge on the history of the smoot

Oliver R. Smoot was selected by his Lambda Chi Alpha fraternity pledgemaster because he was deemed shortest—which made measuring the bridge the most labor-intensive—and he was the "most scientifically named." Smoot repeatedly lay down on the bridge, let his companions mark his new position in chalk or paint, and then got up again. Eventually, he wearied of the exercise and was carried thereafter by the fraternity brothers to each new position.

Smoot graduated from MIT in 1962, and then attended Georgetown University Law Center in Washington, D.C., where he obtained his Juris Doctor. He served as chairman of the American National Standards Institute from 2001 to 2002, and then as president of the International Organization for Standardization from 2003 to 2004.

Public knowledge and interest in the story began when Holiday investigated the marks on the bridge years later, and published an interview with Smoot. The prank's fiftieth anniversary was commemorated on October 4, 2008, as Smoot Celebration Day at MIT, which Smoot attended.

A 2016 April Fools' Day article by the MIT Alumni Association announced that MIT would recalibrate the smoot to 65.7500 inches (1.67005 m) and the ear to 2.48031 inches (62.999874 mm), and the bridge would thus be 372 smoots, give or take 11 ears.

100-smoot mark with the Charles River and Cambridge, Massachusetts in the background

On May 7, 2016, Smoot served as grand marshal of the alumni parade across the bridge, celebrating the 100th anniversary of MIT's move from Boston to Cambridge.

== Practical use ==
The bridge is marked with painted markings indicating how many smoots there are from where the sidewalk begins on the Charles River bank in Boston, with a number every ten smoots. The marks were repainted each semester by the incoming associate member class (similar to pledge class) of Lambda Chi Alpha before they were suspended due to repeated infractions of MIT's alcohol rules. Lambda Chi Alpha alumni, along with current students of MIT, have maintained the markings.

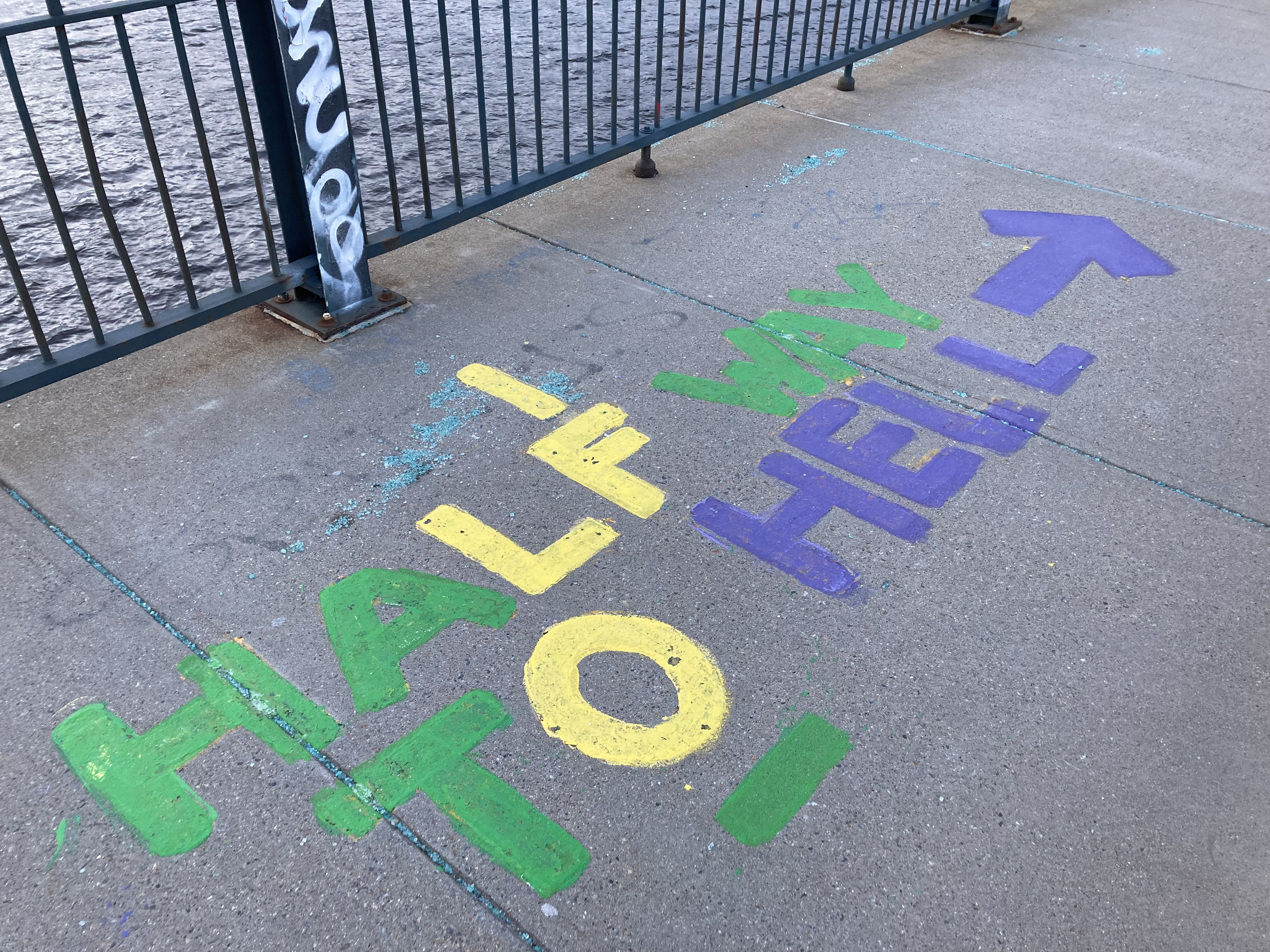
"HALF WAY TO HELL" and an arrow pointing towards MIT.

Markings typically appear every 10 smoots (56 ft; 17 m), but additional marks appear at other numbers in between. For example, the 70-smoot (390 ft; 120 m) mark is accompanied by a mark for 69. The 182.2-smoot (1,017 ft 3 in; 310.1 m) mark is accompanied by the words "Halfway to Hell" and an arrow pointing towards MIT.

The markings are recognized as milestones on the bridge, to the degree that during bridge renovations in the 1980s, the Cambridge, Massachusetts, police department requested that the markings be restored, since they were routinely used in police reports to identify locations on the bridge. The renovators at the Massachusetts Highway Department also scored the concrete surface of the sidewalk on the bridge at 5-foot-7-inch (1.70 m) intervals instead of the conventional 6 feet (1.83 m). The Lambda Zeta (MIT) chapter of Lambda Chi Alpha, which created the smoot markings, continues to repaint the markings once or twice per year.

Starting in 2011, Google Earth enabled the ability to measure distance using smoots, with the standard length of 5 feet 7 inches. The calculator function of Google Search also provides values in smoots, and in 2011, smoot was one of the 10,000 new words added to the fifth edition of The American Heritage Dictionary. Robert Tavernor's book covering the history of measurement is titled Smoot's Ear: The Measure of Humanity. MIT's student-run college radio station WMBR gives its broadcasting wavelength as two smoots (3.4036 m), closely approximating 88.1 MHz (3.4029 m).

== See also ==
- List of unusual units of measurement
