= The Santa Simulation =

- The Big Bang Theory episode
- Episode no.: Season 6 Episode 11
- Directed by: Mark Cendrowski
- Story by: Chuck Lorre; Eric Kaplan; Steve Holland
- Teleplay by: Steven Molaro; Jim Reynolds; Maria Ferrari
- Original air date: December 13, 2012

Guest appearance
- Dakin Matthews as Santa Claus

Episode chronology
← Previous "The Fish Guts Displacement"	Next → "The Egg Salad Equivalency"
- The Big Bang Theory season 6

"The Santa Simulation" is the eleventh episode of the sixth season of the American comedy television series The Big Bang Theory. The episode was originally aired on the CBS television network on December 13, 2012. The story was created by Chuck Lorre, Eric Kaplan and Steve Holland, and turned into a teleplay by Steven Molaro, Jim Reynolds, and Maria Ferrari. Mark Cendrowski directed the episode.

The series depicts a group of male friends employed at the California Institute of Technology, and their relationships with others. In this episode, Leonard Hofstadter (Johnny Galecki) runs a Christmas-themed Dungeons & Dragons game for his friends. Meanwhile, Penny (Kaley Cuoco) and the girls take Raj (Kunal Nayyar) to a club.

"The Santa Simulation" received mostly positive reviews from television critics, with comparisons being made to other shows such as Arrested Development and Community due to the relationships and the Dungeons & Dragons game. The episode was viewed by 16.77 million viewers and received a 5.4/17 percent rating among adults between the ages of 18 and 49, ranking first in its timeslot. The Big Bang Theory was also ranked as the highest-rated program of the night.

== Plot ==
Leonard, Sheldon and Howard each inform their significant others that they will play Dungeons & Dragons and that the girls are banned from participating, while Raj invites Stuart. The game begins at Leonard and Sheldon's apartment, with Leonard as the dungeon master, who reveals the game has a Christmas theme by giving Sheldon a scroll in a Christmas stocking and telling them that their characters have to save Santa Claus from hungry ogres. Sheldon is not happy, and the game begins with Raj's character dying in the first room of the dungeon as he accidentally triggered a fatal trap in his excited rush to save Santa. Penny pokes her head into the room and tells the guys that she thought that they should see what they are missing out on. Penny, Bernadette, and Amy show off their dresses. Raj says he wants to go, but first, the girls tell him that he cannot come because its girls' night but, after the girls leave, Penny pokes her head back in and invites him.

When the girls and Raj arrive at the club, they decide to find a girl for Raj, who initially says that he requires someone physically attractive before admitting that he would take anyone. Raj returns to the girls' table with a girl's email address, but it is fake. Disappointed, he complains that he cannot find anyone and laments about how he used to fancy both Penny and Bernadette. Amy suggests that he at some point had found her attractive, to which he responds that he never has, despite encouragement from both Penny and Bernadette to agree. When he realizes how much that hurts Amy, Raj apologizes to her. Amy and Raj connect over their failed love lives, and Raj suggests that he would like to find someone like her. Satisfied, she leaves the club with the others in tow. Raj laments to Penny that he now finds the unavailable Amy attractive.

Meanwhile, in the game, a trap requires the singing of the carol "Good King Wenceslas" to prevent all the characters from being crushed to death. Although only the first verse is needed, Sheldon sings the entire song. A later puzzle results in the boys playing "Jingle Bells" on handbells, in order to lower a drawbridge. Their characters find Santa and are about to release him when Sheldon double crosses the group, paralyzing the other characters and throwing away the only key to Santa's shackles, leaving him in the dungeon to be eaten by ogres. Sheldon then explains that his maternal grandfather, Pop-Pop, was the only member of his family who supported his scientific pursuits. Pop-Pop died when Sheldon was five and Sheldon asked Santa, that Christmas at a mall, to bring Pop-Pop back, but instead received a set of Lincoln Logs; this traumatized him from celebrating Christmas ever since.

In the tag scene, Santa visits Sheldon in his apartment and apologizes to him for being unable to revive Pop-Pop, but then surprises him by firing a cannon at him in revenge for being left to be eaten by ogres. Sheldon wakes up from his nightmare.

== Production ==
"The Santa Simulation" marks the second appearance of Dungeons & Dragons in a Big Bang Theory plot. It previously appeared in season 5's "The Wiggly Finger Catalyst".

== Broadcast and reception ==
=== Ratings ===
"The Santa Simulation" originally aired on CBS on December 13, 2012. The episode was viewed by 16.77 million viewers and received a 5.4/17% share among adults between the ages of 18 and 49. It was top in its timeslot, ahead of the Fox Network's reality television singing competition The X Factor which received a 2.4/7 percent rating and an episode of the ABC drama series Last Resort, which received a 1.0/3 percent rating. The Big Bang Theory was also the highest rated television show of the night.

=== Reviews ===
"Can we address the Dungeons & Dragons game in a good light yet? It’s widely considered a false "moral dilemma" of the 1980s, but it’s worth considering what weight that brings to the show. On the other hand, a great correlation lies within the structure of the game that is easily compared to the mini-battles of our characters. Even the occupations associated with D&D, such as Fighter or Wizard, speak to the exchanges between Raj and Amy or Sheldon and Santa to provide more insight into their relationships."

— Candace Butler, ScreenCrave

The episode received mostly positive reviews from critics. The A.V. Club reviewer Oliver Sara thought that the episode made Sheldon more sympathetic, while changing the dynamic between Raj and Stuart to something similar to Tobias Fünke and Michael Bluth from Arrested Development. He hoped that the writers would commit to answering the question finally on whether or not Raj is homosexual, and gave the episode an overall grade of "B". IGN writer Jesse Schedeen enjoyed both halves of the episode, but felt that the girls' bar scenes needed more time. While he compared the use of Advanced Dungeons & Dragons in the episode to "Advanced Dungeons & Dragons" that of the series Community, he said the "results were characteristically brilliant", but that the "D&D adventure was more of a loose framing device in this case". He compared Sheldon's breakdown in the episode to that of Pierce Hawthorne in the Community episode, and thought that Sheldon's family revelation was dealt with in a silly manner rather than something "overly depressing". He also enjoyed the beginnings of a new bond between Raj and Amy. He summarised the episode by saying "Season 6 has generally been underwhelming after a fairly strong start. This was the first episode in a while that I genuinely enjoyed without any real reservations."

Carla Day of TV Fanatic doubted she would have enjoyed the episode more if she was a Dungeons & Dragons player. She was left disappointed by the girl's bar scenes, and thought the "only entertaining moment was when Raj and Amy bonded over their youthful woes with the opposite sex". She thought the boy's side of the episode fell flat, with the exception of Sheldon singing and the bell scene. ScreenCrave's Candace Butler enjoyed the manner in which Leonard had tailored the experience, saying "we like how his desire to save Santa mimics our desire to retain holiday traditions of caroling, presents or a holiday-themed mocha at Starbucks". She gave the episode an overall score of 9/10, and said, "The Santa Simulation" was a thought-provoking and humorous Christmas-themed episode. Big Bang Theory did not disappoint when exploring Christmastime, gender roles and innuendo." Maane Khatchatourian for Entertainment Weekly thought that it wasn't as good a Christmas episode as season 2's "The Bath Item Gift Hypothesis", but that "it was hilarious and heartfelt, nonetheless". They were pleased with Raj getting more attention in the episode, but also felt that the two sides of the episode reaffirmed the stereotypes of the characters.
