= The Big Bang Theory season 6 =

The Big Bang Theory
- Season 6
- DVD cover art
- Showrunner: Steven Molaro
- Starring: Johnny Galecki; Jim Parsons; Kaley Cuoco; Simon Helberg; Kunal Nayyar; Mayim Bialik; Melissa Rauch; Kevin Sussman
- No. of episodes: 24

Release
- Original network: CBS
- Original release: September 27, 2012 – May 16, 2013

Season chronology
- ← Previous; Season 5 Next → Season 7

The sixth season of the American television sitcom The Big Bang Theory aired on CBS from September 27, 2012 to May 16, 2013.

The series crossed the 20 million viewer mark for the first time with this season's "The Bakersfield Expedition", which along with NCIS, made CBS the first network to have two scripted series reach that large an audience in the same week since 2007. This success has been attributed to the sitcom's exposure in syndication, its late 2010 move to a new time-slot, and the influence of showrunner Steven Molaro (who took over from Bill Prady) on the characters' storylines.

During the season, Kevin Sussman became a part of the main cast as Stuart Bloom. Mark Cendrowski was nominated for the Directors Guild of America Award for Outstanding Directing – Comedy Series for the season premiere "The Date Night Variable". Jim Parsons won the Primetime Emmy Award for Outstanding Lead Actor in a Comedy Series at the 65th Primetime Emmy Awards for the episode "The Habitation Configuration". Mayim Bialik submitted the episode "The Fish Guts Displacement" for consideration due to her nomination for the Primetime Emmy Award for Outstanding Supporting Actress in a Comedy Series at the 65th Primetime Emmy Awards. Bob Newhart won the Primetime Emmy Award for Outstanding Guest Actor in a Comedy Series at the 65th Primetime Creative Arts Emmy Awards for the episode "The Proton Resurgence".

== Production ==
In January 2011, the series was picked up for a fifth, sixth and seventh season through the 2013–14 television season.

The season finale of the fifth season depicted Howard Wolowitz traveling to the International Space Station (ISS) on board a Soyuz rocket, and the sixth season features him working in the ISS. Thanks to technical consulting from Astronaut Mike Massimino, who also plays himself on the show, the production crew was able to put together sets that realistically depict the Soyuz capsule and the ISS. A small 20-foot (6.1 m) portion of a chamber that is a model of the ISS was rented and used as the set for the ISS. "Unique camera angles and creative framing" were used to make the set look larger. To simulate weightlessness, the production crew decided to use "long skinny platforms" to support the actors from below, rather than use tethers to suspend from above. The actors were required to act out "motions of microgravity" in order to create "theatrical authenticity".

== Cast ==
=== Main cast ===
- Johnny Galecki as Dr. Leonard Hofstadter
- Jim Parsons as Dr. Sheldon Cooper
- Kaley Cuoco as Penny
- Simon Helberg as Howard Wolowitz
- Kunal Nayyar as Dr. Rajesh "Raj" Koothrappali
- Mayim Bialik as Dr. Amy Farrah Fowler
- Melissa Rauch as Dr. Bernadette Rostenkowski Wolowitz
- Kevin Sussman as Stuart Bloom

=== Special guest cast ===
- Howie Mandel as himself
- Buzz Aldrin as himself
- LeVar Burton as himself

=== Recurring cast ===
- Carol Ann Susi as Mrs. Wolowitz
- Pasha Lychnikoff as Dimitri Rezinov
- Mike Massimino as himself
- Margo Harshman as Alex Jensen
- Wil Wheaton as himself
- Casey Sander as Mike Rostenkowski
- Regina King as Janine Davis
- John Ross Bowie as Dr. Barry Kripke
- Kate Micucci as Lucy
- Stephen Hawking as himself (voice)
- Brian Posehn as Dr. "Bert" Bertram Kibbler

=== Guest cast ===
- Jan Hoag as Lilian
- Ken Lerner as Dr. Schneider
- Janelle Marra as Claire
- Ryan Cartwright as Cole
- Meagen Fay as Mrs. Rostenkowski
- Dakin Matthews as Santa
- Matt Battaglia as Officer Reynolds
- Josh Brener as Dale
- Briana Cuoco as Gretchen
- Riccardo LeBron as Tom
- Bob Newhart as Dr. Arthur Jeffries/Professor Proton

== Episodes ==
No. overall	No. in season	Title	Directed by	Written by	Original release date	Prod. code	U.S. viewers (millions)
112	1	"The Date Night Variable"	Mark Cendrowski	Story by : Chuck Lorre & Eric Kaplan & Steve Holland; Teleplay by : Steven Molaro & Jim Reynolds & Maria Ferrari	September 27, 2012	3X7601	15.66
Howard's mother, angry about his plan to move out of her house to live with Bernadette, calls him on the ISS. To appease both Bernadette and his mother, Howard lies to both. Meanwhile, Sheldon invites Raj to his anniversary with Amy to delegate romantic tasks from the Relationship Agreement. Amy kicks Raj out, leading him to crash Leonard and Penny's date. Leonard, unlike Penny, wants to discuss their relationship but accommodates Raj for Penny's sake. Raj's drunken outburst leads to his ejection and bonding with Stuart Bloom at the comic bookstore. Amy's attempts at flirtation go unnoticed by Sheldon until she threatens to break up unless he expresses romance. Sheldon delivers a heartfelt speech, later admitting it's from the first Spider-Man movie.
113	2	"The Decoupling Fluctuation"	Mark Cendrowski	Story by : Chuck Lorre & Jim Reynolds & Maria Ferrari; Teleplay by : Steven Molaro & Eric Kaplan & Steve Holland	October 4, 2012	3X7602	15.18
While organizing Bernadette's wedding gifts, Penny admits to having doubts about her relationship with Leonard and fears breaking up with him again. She confides in Bernadette and Amy but asks them not to tell Leonard. However, Amy shares the secret with Sheldon, who confronts Penny and urges her not to hurt Leonard. That night, Penny tries to discuss her doubts with Leonard, but ends up sleeping with him after seeing his sad expression. The next day, she tells Bernadette and Amy she is fine with their relationship direction since they are not getting married. Meanwhile, Stuart agrees to act like Howard to be Raj's friend, leading them to visit a bar for women, reminiscent of Howard and Raj's dynamic. On the ISS, Howard faces bullying from his co-astronauts, prompting Bernadette to encourage him to stand up for himself. However, they drug him and draw on his face.
114	3	"The Higgs Boson Observation"	Mark Cendrowski	Story by : Steven Molaro & Dave Goetsch & Steve Holland; Teleplay by : Chuck Lorre & Jim Reynolds & Maria Ferrari	October 11, 2012	3X7603	14.23
Sheldon has his childhood scientific notebooks sent over, hoping to find Nobel Prize-worthy material. Unable to read them himself, he hires graduate student Alex Jensen to do so. Amy becomes jealous upon learning about Alex and inspects Sheldon's office, but Penny assures her there is nothing between them. Later, they witness Alex flirting with Leonard, sparking jealousy in Penny as well. Amy suggests Penny's subconscious feelings for Leonard might be the cause. Penny begins to realize Amy might be right. After Alex visits Sheldon and meets Penny and Leonard, Penny takes Leonard to her apartment for intimacy. Meanwhile, Howard's homesickness in space leads to anxiety attacks and cabin fever. Sedated by his fellow astronauts, he ends up performing antics in microgravity.
115	4	"The Re-Entry Minimization"	Mark Cendrowski	Story by : Bill Prady & Jim Reynolds & Anthony Del Broccolo; Teleplay by : Chuck Lorre & Steven Molaro & Eric Kaplan	October 18, 2012	3X7604	15.73
After a humiliating loss to Penny and Amy in Pictionary, Sheldon and Leonard challenge them to a series of games. Despite their efforts, the women easily defeat the men each time, thanks to Amy's intelligence and Penny's athleticism, coupled with Leonard and Sheldon's inability to cooperate. Meanwhile, Howard returns to Earth expecting a warm welcome, but only Bernadette greets him at the airport. His homecoming is overshadowed by Howie Mandel, causing disappointment. Bernadette's cold cuts short their "honeymoon" and Howard discovers his mother's affair. Feeling displaced, Howard tries to seek solace with his friends but finds Stuart has replaced him as Raj's best friend. Rejected by his friends, Howard ends up alone in a diner, where he is recognized as an astronaut by the waitress. However, he also finds that he has caught Bernadette’s cold.
116	5	"The Holographic Excitation"	Mark Cendrowski	Story by : Chuck Lorre & Eric Kaplan & Jeremy Howe; Teleplay by : Steven Molaro & Steve Holland & Maria Ferrari	October 25, 2012	3X7605	15.82
Stuart and Raj organize a Halloween costume party at the comic book store. Amy and Bernadette will go with their partners, but Penny dislikes parties at the store. Amy and Bernadette then persuade her to show interest in Leonard's activities just as he shows interest in hers despite not liking them. Taking their advice, she visits Leonard's lab, is fascinated by his work, is turned on, and has sex with him there - and whenever she visits his lab or he shows how smart he is, as at the party. Meanwhile, Sheldon and Amy argue over pair costumes, compromising between Amy's preferred Raggedy Ann & Andy and Sheldon's R2-D2 & C-3PO to go as Raggedy Ann and Raggedy C-3PO. Elsewhere, Howard talks endlessly about his space mission, boring his friends. Before sex, Bernadette forbids all space talk, so he boycotts the party. She drags him along anyway; he lashes out at Raj for having him silenced. Bernadette confronts Howard, who reveals that without space he is "just...Howard Wolowitz". She says she fell in love with "just...Howard Wolowitz"; they kiss. Raj later sends him a video of Buzz Aldrin boring children by endlessly mentioning his Moon trip, and Howard finally realizes his mistake.
117	6	"The Extract Obliteration"	Mark Cendrowski	Story by : Chuck Lorre & Bill Prady & Steve Holland; Teleplay by : Steven Molaro & Jim Reynolds & Eric Kaplan	November 1, 2012	3X7606	15.90
Penny reenrolls in community college in a bid to finally graduate. She keeps this from Leonard, who would get very excited, but on Bernadette's and Amy's advice she tells him anyway. That night, Leonard reads Penny's homework paper on slavery. It is so bad that he rewrites it entirely, showing her in the morning, but she is angry and refuses to accept it, saying she will do all her college work unaided. Later, Penny shows Leonard her B− for her own version and mocks him for thinking her not smart enough. However, Bernadette and Amy had helped her rewrite the paper and purposely made it worth a B− to make it more "believable". Meanwhile, Sheldon starts playing Words with Friends online with Stephen Hawking, winning almost every game. Sheldon is distraught when Hawking stops playing, thinking he stopped after persistently losing. The next day, Hawking resumes playing with Sheldon, who purposely loses to ensure Hawking keeps playing. That night, Hawking phones to mock him for losing, much to Leonard's amusement.
118	7	"The Habitation Configuration"	Mark Cendrowski	Story by : Chuck Lorre & Eric Kaplan & Jim Reynolds; Teleplay by : Steven Molaro & Steve Holland & Maria Ferrari	November 8, 2012	3X7607	16.68
Sheldon invites Wil Wheaton for a special Fun With Flags podcast about Star Trek flags, but Amy and Wil clash. Sheldon confides in Penny about his concerns over the situation. Penny encourages Sheldon to stand up for Amy, so Sheldon drunkenly confronts Wil and demands an apology. Afterward, Sheldon vomits and comes to his senses. Sheldon and Amy reconcile and reshoot the podcast with LeVar Burton, but Amy still struggles to get along with him. Meanwhile, Howard moves into Bernadette's apartment and reminisces about performing magic tricks for his mother. Bernadette suggests they spend time at his mother's house to keep her company.
119	8	"The 43 Peculiarity"	Mark Cendrowski	Story by : Chuck Lorre & Dave Goetsch & Anthony Del Broccolo; Teleplay by : Steven Molaro & Jim Reynolds & Steve Holland	November 15, 2012	3X7608	17.63
Leonard becomes jealous of Penny's British classmate, Cole, assuming he's hitting on her. His confrontation with Cole leads to Penny overhearing and being furious at Leonard's lack of trust. Meanwhile, Leonard confides in Alex about his insecurity, unaware she's flirting with him. Penny finally confesses her love for Leonard during their conversation about jealousy. Meanwhile, Howard and Raj spy on Sheldon to discover what he does daily from 2:45 to 3:05 pm. They find him in a storage room with the number "43" on a chalkboard. Despite their efforts to decode its meaning, Sheldon catches them and reveals the room is his sanctuary. The episode ends with Sheldon playing with a hacky sack, revealing "43" as his maximum consecutive hits. Note: This is the final episode of the series in which Melissa Rauch does not appear as Bernadette.
120	9	"The Parking Spot Escalation"	Peter Chakos	Story by : Chuck Lorre & Eric Kaplan & Adam Faberman; Teleplay by : Steven Molaro & Steve Holland & Maria Ferrari	November 29, 2012	3X7609	17.25
Howard buys a new car with his space mission money and claims Sheldon's parking spot, sparking a feud. Sheldon and Howard retaliate by taking each other's possessions and engaging in various antics. Their partners, Amy and Bernadette, get involved, escalating the conflict. The feud ends when Raj mediates an agreement for Howard to keep the spot until Sheldon learns to drive or gets a Batmobile. Sheldon reconciles with Howard and Bernadette, and Sheldon sells his laptop to the dry cleaner's son.
121	10	"The Fish Guts Displacement"	Mark Cendrowski	Story by : Chuck Lorre & Bill Prady & Tara Hernandez; Teleplay by : Steven Molaro & Eric Kaplan & Jim Reynolds	December 6, 2012	3X7610	16.94
Howard struggles to bond with Bernadette's father during dinner, prompting Bernadette to arrange a fishing trip for them. Despite their initial reluctance, they find common ground and bond over shared experiences. Meanwhile, Amy gets the flu, and Sheldon reluctantly takes care of her according to their Relationship Agreement. Amy pretends to still be sick to receive Sheldon's care, but Sheldon discovers her deception. Despite his reluctance, Amy enjoys being disciplined by Sheldon for her lie.
122	11	"The Santa Simulation"	Mark Cendrowski	Story by : Chuck Lorre & Eric Kaplan & Steve Holland; Teleplay by : Steven Molaro & Jim Reynolds & Maria Ferrari	December 13, 2012	3X7611	16.77
The men and Stuart play Dungeons & Dragons without the women. Dungeon Master Leonard sets up a Christmas theme where players must rescue Santa Claus from a gang of ogres to Sheldon's chagrin as he hates Christmas. Raj's character dies early on, so he joins Penny, Bernadette and Amy for girls' night at a bar. There, Raj laments remaining single despite otherwise being successful. The women sympathize, Amy even sharing her experiences of loneliness with him. This comforts him but also draws him to Amy, the only woman in the gang to whom he was not yet attracted. In the game, meanwhile, Sheldon paralyses Howard's and Stuart's characters in Santa's dungeon, berating Santa for not bringing Pop-Pop (Sheldon's maternal grandfather, the only family member to encourage his scientific pursuits) back to life, his childhood Santa wish. He abandons Santa to be eaten alive by the ogres. Sheldon later has a nightmare about Santa, who apologizes for being unable to resurrect Pop-Pop, before firing a cannon at him.
123	12	"The Egg Salad Equivalency"	Mark Cendrowski	Story by : Jim Reynolds; Teleplay by : Steven Molaro	January 3, 2013	3X7612	19.25
Alex invites Leonard to Kip Thorne's lecture on quantum foam, but he declines due to a date with Penny. Alex suggests discussing the lecture over dinner, prompting Leonard to realize she is hitting on him. Despite feeling flattered, Leonard is committed to Penny. When Sheldon learns of the situation, he is unhappy and seeks advice from Amy, Penny, and Bernadette without revealing names. The women quickly deduce the real situation, upsetting Penny. Sheldon's attempt to address the issue with Alex leads to a sexual harassment complaint and unintentional racist and misogynistic remarks towards an Afro-American HR admin. To avoid a seminar, Sheldon has Alex complete it for him. Meanwhile, Leonard apologizes to Penny with a cello performance and reassures her of his commitment. Penny copes with her insecurities by adopting a scientist's look, which turns Leonard on.
124	13	"The Bakersfield Expedition"	Mark Cendrowski	Story by : Chuck Lorre & Jim Reynolds & Steve Holland; Teleplay by : Steven Molaro & Eric Kaplan & Maria Ferrari	January 10, 2013	3X7613	20.00
Leonard drives the men to the Bakersfield Comic-Con but makes an unscheduled stop at Vasquez Rocks to take photos as Star Trek: The Next Generation characters. However, their car, along with their clothes and phones, gets stolen. Stranded in the Californian desert, they fail to hitch a ride to Bakersfield and report the theft to a police officer before giving up on Comic-Con. They return to Pasadena with Howard's mother's help. Meanwhile, the women try to understand the men's love for comics and superheroes by reading them, leading to heated debates. When the men return, they join the discussion, inspired by Star Trek. In the final scene, the car thieves enjoy a quiz programmed by Sheldon in the stolen car's navigation system.
125	14	"The Cooper/Kripke Inversion"	Mark Cendrowski	Story by : Chuck Lorre & Eric Kaplan & Anthony Del Broccolo; Teleplay by : Steven Molaro & Jim Reynolds & Steve Holland	January 31, 2013	3X7614	17.76
Sheldon and Kripke are forced to work together on a fusion reactor project. To Sheldon's dismay, Kripke's work is far superior and more advanced than his. He is so upset he even allows Amy to hug him. Kripke confronts him over his poor work but thinks incessant sex with Amy is the cause. Sheldon surprisingly supports this erroneous theory to prevent colleagues discovering he is not the smartest person in Caltech. That evening he shocks Penny and Leonard with an incredible revelation: he is working to slowly overcome his discomfort with physical contact, and it is a "possibility" that he could one day have a physical relationship with Amy. Meanwhile, Howard and Raj order customized action figures of themselves but receive highly unrealistic models. They then buy a used 3D printer for $5,000 to make precise figures of themselves and Bernadette. She is delighted with the figures of Howard and herself until she hears how much Howard paid for the printer. She removes Howard from their joint account to teach him the value of money; he sells his half of the printer to Raj.
126	15	"The Spoiler Alert Segmentation"	Mark Cendrowski	Story by : Chuck Lorre & Eric Kaplan & Steve Holland; Teleplay by : Steven Molaro & Maria Ferrari & Adam Faberman	February 7, 2013	3X7615	18.98
Leonard moves out of the apartment after Sheldon spoils the ending of Harry Potter and the Half-Blood Prince. He moves in with Penny, who feels uncomfortable but cannot convince Leonard to return. Amy considers moving in with Sheldon after discovering Leonard's departure, which makes Sheldon uneasy. Eventually, Penny and Sheldon decide to confess the truth to their partners, leading to tension among the four. Meanwhile, Howard asks Raj to check on his depressed mother while he's away in Las Vegas. Raj ends up spending the night as Debbie, Howard's mother, pampers him and prevents him from leaving by hiding his clothes and car keys.
127	16	"The Tangible Affection Proof"	Mark Cendrowski	Story by : Chuck Lorre & Bill Prady & Steve Holland; Teleplay by : Steven Molaro & Jim Reynolds & Tara Hernandez	February 14, 2013	3X7616	17.89
On Valentine's Day, Leonard and Penny have dinner with Howard and Bernadette, but tensions rise when Penny gets upset after seeing an ex-boyfriend propose. She and Leonard argue, with Penny admitting her fear of Leonard proposing before she is ready. They reconcile when Leonard suggests she propose when she feels ready. Meanwhile, Sheldon asks Alex to buy a Valentine's gift for Amy but keeps it for himself. When Amy cancels their Valentine's dinner plans and proposes that they stay home and watch Star Trek together, Sheldon stuns Amy by making her his emergency contact. Amy appreciates the gesture but gets annoyed by Sheldon's hypochondria. Raj and Stuart throw a singles' party, where Raj ends up leaving with Lucy after giving a speech about not being alone.
128	17	"The Monster Isolation"	Mark Cendrowski	Story by : Chuck Lorre & Dave Goetsch & Maria Ferrari; Teleplay by : Steven Molaro & Eric Kaplan & Steve Holland	February 21, 2013	3X7617	17.62
Raj and Lucy have coffee after the Valentine's Day party, but Lucy feigns going to the bathroom and flees their date. Raj is so hurt that he stays in his apartment, feeling incapable of any dating, and refuses to go to work or hang out with friends. When Howard confronts Lucy over her behavior, she gives him her phone number for Raj. Howard then visits Raj at his apartment to give him the number, where he is wearing just a pair of white briefs and Uggs. Initially he has no interest in seeing her again, but later relents. Lucy visits him to apologize for walking out of their date, revealing she is very shy and uncomfortable around people she does not know, but is working on it. Pleased at this, he admits his selective mutism, which she cannot believe, though she agrees to another date to find out. Meanwhile, Sheldon's special guest for a Fun with Flags podcast about the Flag of Nebraska is Penny, who also coaches him on his body language. In a webcam chat, Amy later says he should thank Penny for helping with his podcast. When he does so, she invites him to her class play A Streetcar Named Desire. On Amy's advice he reluctantly agrees to attend, with Amy and Leonard. The play is a success, Penny's strong performance impressing even Sheldon.
129	18	"The Contractual Obligation Implementation"	Mark Cendrowski	Story by : Chuck Lorre & Eric Kaplan & Steve Holland; Teleplay by : Steven Molaro & Jim Reynolds & Maria Ferrari	March 7, 2013	3X7618	17.63
As part of their Caltech contracts, Leonard, Sheldon, and Howard are tasked with promoting science among young women. They struggle to inspire middle school girls, so Sheldon calls Amy and Bernadette for help. Meanwhile, Amy, Bernadette, and Penny skip work to visit Disneyland dressed as Disney princesses. At home, their costumes excite their partners, but Sheldon is too tired to indulge Amy's fantasy. Raj and Lucy have a "texting date" in the library, but Lucy gets nervous when she considers kissing Raj, fleeing before doing so.
130	19	"The Closet Reconfiguration"	Anthony Rich	Story by : Chuck Lorre & Jim Reynolds & Maria Ferrari; Teleplay by : Steven Molaro & Steve Holland & Eric Kaplan	March 14, 2013	3X7619	15.90
When Sheldon offends Bernadette by bringing take-out to a Thai food dinner party she prepared, she and Howard trick him into cleaning their closet. In the process, Sheldon finds and reads a letter to Howard from his long-lost father on his 18th birthday. Howard destroys the letter but remains conflicted. The group tricks Sheldon into revealing the letter's content, causing Howard to storm out. Sheldon uses quantum superposition to convey the letter's content without Howard actually knowing. Each person invents a version of the letter's content, but only one is true. Howard returns, pleased with the various versions, and rejoins the dinner party.
131	20	"The Tenure Turbulence"	Mark Cendrowski	Story by : Steven Molaro & Eric Kaplan & Maria Ferrari; Teleplay by : Chuck Lorre & Steve Holland & Jim Reynolds	April 4, 2013	3X7620	17.24
After Professor Tupperman's death, Sheldon, Leonard, Raj and Kripke fight for his tenured position and try to impress Janine Davis, Caltech's HR administrator and head of the tenure committee. Leonard and Kripke exercise with her at the gym to talk to her, but Leonard suffers an asthma attack. Raj sends her a 90-minute video autobiography. Sheldon gives her a DVD of the TV miniseries Roots to make up for his earlier racist comments, but when she does not appreciate it, he offends her by asking "you are black, right?". Sheldon, Leonard and Raj attend Tupperman's memorial service, Sheldon and Leonard taking Amy and Penny to impress the tenure committee. On their encounter before the memorial service they lash out at each other, even Amy and Penny joining in. The fight stops only when Leonard realizes he would rather lose the tenured post than lose his friends. The five decide to leave, but stay after observing Kripke flatter Davis. Sheldon, Leonard and Raj are eventually shortlisted for the tenured position purely on the basis of their accomplishments. Sheldon thanks Davis, but offends her yet again by offering her a supposed "traditional black handshake".
132	21	"The Closure Alternative"	Mark Cendrowski	Story by : Chuck Lorre & Bill Prady & Tara Hernandez; Teleplay by : Steven Molaro & Jim Reynolds & Steve Holland	April 25, 2013	3X7621	15.05
Sheldon is distressed by the cancellation of the SyFy television series Alphas and tries unsuccessfully to get it back on air. Amy attempts to teach him to overcome his obsession with closure by interrupting his tasks before they finish. Sheldon pretends to be cured but secretly completes them once Amy leaves. Later, he calls the creator of Alphas to learn the ending but is unimpressed. Meanwhile, Leonard tries to bond with Penny over Buffy the Vampire Slayer, but she only pretends to enjoy it. Penny confides in Bernadette about her lack of passions but realizes she is passionate about Leonard and his friends. Raj is upset by Lucy's blog post describing him as "feminine" leading to awkwardness on their date until he explains he read her blog, and she appreciates his sweet and thoughtful nature.
133	22	"The Proton Resurgence"	Mark Cendrowski	Story by : Chuck Lorre & Jim Reynolds & Steve Holland; Teleplay by : Steven Molaro & Eric Kaplan & Maria Ferrari	May 2, 2013	3X7622	16.29
Sheldon and Leonard invite Professor Proton, their childhood science show host, to perform at their apartment. He bonds with Penny but feels disillusioned about his TV persona and struggles with Penny's lack of scientific knowledge. Despite this, he's encouraged to learn Sheldon and Leonard became physicists because of him. When he's hospitalized, he asks Sheldon to fill in for him at a child's birthday party, strengthening their bond. Meanwhile, Raj's Yorkshire Terrier goes missing under Howard and Bernadette's care, causing tension until she is found safe. Bernadette makes Raj feel guilty for letting them worry. Note: This is the final episode of the series in which Mayim Bialik does not appear as Amy.
134	23	"The Love Spell Potential"	Anthony Rich	Story by : Chuck Lorre & Jim Reynolds & Maria Ferrari; Teleplay by : Steven Molaro & Eric Kaplan & Steve Holland	May 9, 2013	3X7623	16.30
The women head to Las Vegas for the weekend, leaving the men to play Dungeons & Dragons with Howard as Dungeon Master, adding humorous voice impressions along the way. Raj leaves the game when Lucy, his date, becomes available. Lucy confesses to Raj that she is trying to force herself to do things that scare her. Their date goes well until Raj tries to control Lucy's food choices, leading to a confrontation. Raj tells her that he likes her a lot, especially for having more emotional problems than him, and that he thinks she is wonderful. They reconcile and share a kiss. Meanwhile, Amy's assault on a TSA officer delays the women's flight. They join the men's game, but tensions rise when Penny suggests Sheldon and Amy's game characters have sex. Amy feels mocked and locks herself in Sheldon's room. Sheldon consoles her, expressing his intimacy with her despite their non-sexual relationship. They simulate a sex scene with their game characters.
135	24	"The Bon Voyage Reaction"	Mark Cendrowski	Story by : Steven Molaro & Steve Holland & Tara Hernandez; Teleplay by : Chuck Lorre & Jim Reynolds & Maria Ferrari	May 16, 2013	3X7624	15.48
Stephen Hawking plans a North Sea expedition to find the hydrodynamic equivalent of Unruh radiation. Howard suggests Leonard to replace the team's physicist, despite Leonard's reluctance to leave Penny for four months. Penny encourages Leonard, while Sheldon, jealous and afraid of solitude, tries to dissuade him. Following Penny's advice, Sheldon overcomes his jealousy and toasts Leonard at his bon voyage party. Meanwhile, the gang wants to meet Lucy, who struggles with meeting new people. Amy handles Lucy well, but Lucy becomes scared when Raj questions her about where their relationship is going. Raj apologizes to Lucy and she agrees to attend Leonard's party, but she has second thoughts and breaks up with Raj via text. Penny consoles Raj, who realizes he has overcome his selective mutism since Lucy broke up with him. The episode ends with Raj annoying the women by incessantly talking about Lucy.

== Ratings ==
Viewership and ratings per episode of The Big Bang Theory season 6
No.	Title	Air date	Rating/share (18–49)	Viewers (millions)	DVR (18–49)	DVR viewers (millions)	Total (18–49)	Total viewers (millions)
1	"The Date Night Variable"	September 27, 2012	5.0/15	15.66	1.9	3.91	6.9	19.57
2	"The Decoupling Fluctuation"	October 4, 2012	4.9/16	15.18	1.7	3.82	6.6	18.99
3	"The Higgs Boson Observation"	October 11, 2012	4.5/13	14.23	2.0	4.43	6.5	18.66
4	"The Re-Entry Minimization"	October 18, 2012	4.8/15	15.73	1.9	4.13	6.8	19.87
5	"The Holographic Excitation"	October 25, 2012	5.0/15	15.82	2.2	4.34	7.2	20.16
6	"The Extract Obliteration"	November 1, 2012	5.2/15	15.90	2.0	3.94	7.2	19.84
7	"The Habitation Configuration"	November 8, 2012	5.1/15	16.68	2.0	4.24	7.1	20.92
8	"The 43 Peculiarity"	November 15, 2012	5.7/17	17.63	1.8	3.90	7.5	21.54
9	"The Parking Spot Escalation"	November 29, 2012	5.5/16	17.25	1.9	3.82	7.4	21.07
10	"The Fish Guts Displacement"	December 6, 2012	5.2/16	16.94	1.9	4.09	7.1	21.03
11	"The Santa Simulation"	December 13, 2012	5.4/17	16.77	2.0	4.43	7.5	21.19
12	"The Egg Salad Equivalency"	January 3, 2013	6.1/18	19.25	1.9	4.13	8.0	23.38
13	"The Bakersfield Expedition"	January 10, 2013	6.4/19	20.00	1.9	3.81	8.3	23.81
14	"The Cooper/Kripke Inversion"	January 31, 2013	5.4/16	17.76	2.0	4.11	7.4	21.87
15	"The Spoiler Alert Segmentation"	February 7, 2013	6.2/18	18.98	1.8	3.96	8.0	22.94
16	"The Tangible Affection Proof"	February 14, 2013	5.5/17	17.89	2.0	4.36	7.5	22.24
17	"The Monster Isolation"	February 21, 2013	5.6/17	17.62	2.0	4.44	7.6	22.06
18	"The Contractual Obligation Implementation"	March 7, 2013	5.5/17	17.63	2.0	4.28	7.5	21.90
19	"The Closet Reconfiguration"	March 14, 2013	4.8/16	15.90	1.8	4.09	6.6	20.05
20	"The Tenure Turbulence"	April 4, 2013	5.2/17	17.24	2.0	4.26	7.2	21.51
21	"The Closure Alternative"	April 25, 2013	4.5/15	15.05	2.1	4.58	6.6	19.63
22	"The Proton Resurgence"	May 2, 2013	4.9/17	16.29	2.3	5.02	7.2	21.31
23	"The Love Spell Potential"	May 9, 2013	4.9/17	16.30	2.1	4.74	7.0	21.04
24	"The Bon Voyage Reaction"	May 16, 2013	4.8/16	15.48	2.2	4.86	7.0	20.34

== Reception ==
The sixth season, specifically its first four episodes, received mixed reviews compared to prior seasons. In regards to sending the Howard Wolowitz character into space, June Thomas of Slate wrote that "The Big Bang Theory's creators deserve praise for their willingness to shake things up. After five incredibly successful seasons of nerdy laughs, it would’ve been easy to coast. Instead, they chose to press the reset button and disrupt the familiar friendships. Still, I hope things settle down soon, because so far this season, it’s all been a bit of a bummer". Oliver Sava of The A.V. Club criticized the character of Wolowitz's mother, writing that "Howard's mom has outlived her usefulness on this series, and rather than an obstacle for the character, she’s become a crutch for the writers to lean on". Jesse Schedeen of IGN criticized the storylines, writing that "The entire episode was pretty much predicated on two jokes ... But those two jokes had enough mileage in them to last a full 22 minutes".
