= The Good Guy Fluctuation =

- The Big Bang Theory episode
- Episode no.: Season 5 Episode 7
- Directed by: Mark Cendrowski
- Story by: Chuck Lorre; Dave Goetsch; Maria Ferrari
- Teleplay by: Bill Prady; Steven Molaro; Steve Holland
- Production code: 3X6857
- Original air date: October 27, 2011
- Running time: 20 minutes

Guest appearances
- Courtney Ford as Alice; Aarti Mann as Priya Koothrappali; Kevin Sussman as Stuart Bloom

Episode chronology
← Previous "The Rhinitis Revelation"	Next → "The Isolation Permutation"
- The Big Bang Theory season 5

"The Good Guy Fluctuation" is the seventh episode of the fifth season of the US sitcom The Big Bang Theory and the 94th episode of the show overall. It first aired on CBS on October 27, 2011.

In the episode, Leonard (Johnny Galecki) is uncertain whether to cheat on his girlfriend while Sheldon (Jim Parsons) is the victim of a Halloween prank and attempts to get revenge.

== Plot ==
Morality is just a fiction used by the herd of inferior human beings to hold back the few superior men.

— Friedrich Nietzsche; Sheldon quotes him when Leonard asks for advice

Leonard, still in a long-distance relationship with his girlfriend Priya, meets an artist and comic book enthusiast named Alice, and they are attracted to each other. He asks Penny for advice, but she does not offer anything he finds useful. He then goes to Sheldon, who quotes Friedrich Nietzsche. Leonard finds this advice helpful and goes to Alice's apartment. As they are kissing, he changes his mind and decides not to cheat on Priya. Leonard tells Alice that he is in a relationship and is thrown out of her apartment. Afterwards, he tells Priya via Skype what happened with Alice. Priya, however, admits she had sex with her ex-boyfriend. Shocked that she outright slept with another man while he only kissed a woman, Leonard ends the conversation and is left in dismay.

Meanwhile, Sheldon is the victim of a Halloween prank. He attempts to get revenge on Leonard by placing an airbag in his mailbox, but this backfires because Leonard turns it on him. Then, he hides a snake in Raj's desk at work; however, Raj is not afraid of it and adores it. Sheldon goes to Howard's house with a joy buzzer and asks to shake his hand. Howard shakes hands and then falls to the floor. Bernadette tells Sheldon that Howard had a heart condition and forces Sheldon to inject adrenaline into his heart. Howard opens his eyes and reveals that he was just pretending to faint. Sheldon then accidentally shocks himself while giving himself a face slap in frustration.

Finally, Sheldon successfully pranks Leonard; after his video chat with Priya, Sheldon jumps up from under the couch cushions dressed as a zombie. Successfully scaring Leonard, he declares, "Bazinga, punk! Now we're even."

== Reception ==
=== Ratings ===
On the night of its first broadcast on October 27, 2011 at 8 p.m., the episode was watched by 14.54 million U.S. households. It received a Nielsen rating of 4.6/13 within the 18-49 demographic. Within its timeslot, it ranked second after a World Series game with 21.06 million viewers. It beat a rerun of It's the Great Pumpkin, Charlie Brown on ABC, The Vampire Diaries on The CW and Community on NBC.

The episode was watched by more households than any other show on CBS that night: Rules of Engagement received 10.62 million viewers at 8:30 p.m.; Person of Interest received 11.62 million viewers at 9 p.m.; The Mentalist received 12.42 million viewers at 10 p.m.

In Canada, the episode aired on the same night on CTV Total and received 3.751 million viewers. It was the most watched show that week.

In Australia, the show first aired on November 7, 2011 at 8 p.m. It was watched by 1.346 million, making it the second most watched episode that night and the sixth highest rated episode that week.

In the UK, the episode aired on December 8, 2011 and received 1.079 million views on E4, ranking it second that week for the channel. On E4 +1, it received 0.316 million watches and was ranked third. Overall, it was ranked seventh on cable.

=== Critical response ===
Oliver Sava of The A.V. Club gave the episode a C, describing it as "a completely average installment that feels like a leftover story from the earlier seasons".

The TV Critic rated the episode 68 out of 100, saying it was "such a simple episode" and "really effective" as it "drove the plot while making use of the season and the characters".

Jenna Busch of IGN gave the episode 9 out of 10. Busch said that Leonard's cheating was "out of character", but enjoyed Sheldon's pranks and summarized that "overall, this was a pretty fantastic episode".

Carla Day from TV Fanatic gave a rating of 4.5 out of 5, claiming that "this was a well-done Halloween episode". Day wanted Alice to appear in future episodes, saying that "the writers messed this one up big time", and suggested that "Jim Parsons should submit this episode for his Emmy consideration".
