= The Egg Salad Equivalency =

- The Big Bang Theory episode
- Episode no.: Season 6 Episode 12
- Directed by: Mark Cendrowski
- Story by: Chuck Lorre, Eric Kaplan and Jim Reynolds
- Teleplay by: Steven Molaro, Bill Prady and Steve Holland
- Original air date: January 3, 2013

Episode chronology
← Previous "The Santa Simulation"	Next → "The Bakersfield Expedition"
- The Big Bang Theory season 6

"The Egg Salad Equivalency" is the twelfth episode of the sixth season of the American comedy television series The Big Bang Theory. The episode was originally aired on the CBS television network on January 3, 2013. The story was created by Chuck Lorre, Eric Kaplan and Jim Reynolds, then turned into a teleplay by Steven Molaro, Bill Prady and Steve Holland. Mark Cendrowski directed the episode.

"The Egg Salad Equivalency" received positive reviews from critics. In the United States, this episode was watched by 19.25 million viewers and received 6.1/18 percent rating among adults between 18 and 49, ranking first in both its timeslot and the night.

== Synopsis ==
Sheldon's assistant, Alex, flirts with Leonard a little more openly, and he finally picks up on it. Leonard is intrigued by the prospect of being liked by two women at the same time, but he has no feelings for Alex whatsoever; he just likes the attention. When he discusses how to handle this issue with the guys, Sheldon immediately voices his displeasure with the scenario, feeling that Alex should focus on him alone. Sheldon covertly tries to get advice from Penny, Amy, and Bernadette about what to do using a thinly disguised scenario, but Penny figures out that he is referring to Leonard and Alex and gets irritated, becoming even more upset when Sheldon off-handedly reveals that Leonard enjoys Alex's flirtation.

Sheldon tries to talk to Alex about it directly, but his graphic suggestions and inappropriate comments about women cause her to file a sexual harassment complaint. Sheldon has the same problem with the human resources administrator, calling black woman Janine Davis a "slave" to her biological urges, and tries to explain himself discussing a woman's menstrual cycle. Frustrated, Sheldon dishes out dirt on some of the inappropriate things the others have done in the past, which results in Raj, Howard and Leonard being called into HR alongside him. Sheldon is required to take an online sexual harassment course, which he delegates to Alex, saying he does not want to waste time on it.

Leonard gives Penny a musical apology about Alex's hitting on him. He also discovers that Penny can be insecure about their relationship though they make up after Leonard tells her that Alex means nothing to him. At the end of the episode, Penny decides to get over her insecurities by wearing a pair of eyeglasses to look smarter, which turns Leonard on.

== Broadcast and reception ==
=== Ratings in the US ===
"The Egg Salad Equivalency" originally aired on CBS on January 3, 2013. The episode was watched by 19.25 million viewers and received 6.1/18 percent rating among adults between 18 and 49. It was top in its timeslot, ahead of the Fox Network's reality television show Mobbed, and the repeat of National Broadcasting Company's comedy series 30 Rock, American Broadcasting Company's musical series Nashville, and The CW Television Network's drama The Vampire Diaries. The Big Bang Theory was also the highest rated show of the night.

=== Reception ===
Jesse Schedeen from IGN gave this episode an 8.4/10 and called this episode "very Sheldon-focused". She praised the episode for "plenty of Sheldon-centric humor", and "sparing but effective use of the supporting characters". However, she also said that "the final HR showdown was too brief", and Alex is useless in this episode.

Oliver Sara from The A.V. Club gave this episode an A, calling it "one of the strongest episodes of The Big Bang Theory’s six seasons", in which Sheldon's comments to women reached "Curb Your Enthusiasm levels of awkwardness".
