= The Rhinitis Revelation =

- The Big Bang Theory episode
- Episode no.: Season 5 Episode 6
- Directed by: Howard Murray
- Story by: Chuck Lorre; Eric Kaplan; Steve Holland
- Teleplay by: Bill Prady; Steven Molaro; Jim Reynolds
- Production code: 3X6856
- Original air date: October 20, 2011
- Running time: 22 minutes

Guest appearance
- Laurie Metcalf as Mary Cooper

Episode chronology
← Previous "The Russian Rocket Reaction"	Next → "The Good Guy Fluctuation"
- The Big Bang Theory season 5

"The Rhinitis Revelation" is the sixth episode of the fifth season of the US sitcom The Big Bang Theory and the 93rd episode of the show overall. It first aired on CBS on October 20, 2011.

== Plot ==
Sheldon's mother, Mary Cooper, is going on a Christian cruise called the "Born Again Boat Ride". Before the cruise, she has a weekend in Pasadena and visits Sheldon. However, he is upset when she does not do anything on his itinerary. Instead of his mother making fried chicken and making pecan pie, they go out to a restaurant for sushi; when doing laundry with Sheldon, Mary is distracted by Penny and leaves. The following day, Mary rejects a Saul Perlmutter lecture to go sight-seeing and even leads the rest of the gang to a Roman Catholic church for a prayer session. After she makes a short prayer about Sheldon, Penny prays for her brother to stop cooking meth, Leonard's prayer relates to his relationship with Priya and Raj, despite being a Hindu, prays that he can lose weight. Howard does not pray as he is a Jew.

Sheldon denies to Amy that he is in a bad mood because of his mother neglecting him. Amy tells Sheldon that he experiences emotions like everyone else. Later, when sitting next to a stranger in the rain, Sheldon makes a soliloquy about them being very similar, despite his intelligence. He gets a cold from the rain and his mother takes care of him, putting VapoRub on his chest and singing "Soft Kitty", though she urges him to act more mature as he is no longer a child.

== Production ==
A week before the episode aired, a brief plot description was put on Twitter, revealing that Sheldon's mother would be appearing again.

== Reception ==
=== Ratings ===
On October 20, 2011, the night it first aired in the U.S., the episode was watched by 14.93 million households and received a Nielsen rating of 5.1/16. The episode aired alongside the start of a 2011 World Series match on Fox, which received 14.28 million viewers; episodes of Charlie's Angels on ABC and Community on NBC airing at 8 p.m. received 5.57 and 2.39 million viewers, respectively.

On CBS, The Big Bang Theory was followed by a season premiere of Rules of Engagement, an hour-long episode of Person of Interest and The Mentalist. All episodes were watched by over 10 million; The Big Bang Theory received the most viewers (14.93 million) while The Mentalist received the second most (12.54 million).

"The Rhinitis Revelation" was watched by more viewers than both the previous and following episodes; all three aired in the same timeslot: Thursday at 8 p.m.

In Canada, the episode aired at the same time and received 3.550 million viewers on CTV Total, making it the most watched television show that week. The second most watched episode that week was The Amazing Race 19, airing on Sunday on CTV and receiving 2.608 million views. The second highest viewership on the same night was Grey's Anatomy, which was watched by 2.246 million watchers.

In Australia, the episode aired on Nine Network on October 31, 2011 (a Monday) at 8 p.m. It received 1.397 million viewers, making it most watched that night and placing it sixth in the weekly ranking. The five shows that had more viewers that week all aired on Tuesday on Channel Seven, with three being coverage of the 2011 Melbourne Spring Racing Carnival.

In the United Kingdom, the episode aired on December 1, 2011. It received 1.133 million views on E4 and 0.286 on E4 +1: a total of 1.419 million. It ranked second and fourth on the channels, respectively, and a rank of eight on cable overall.

=== Reviews ===
Jenna Busch from IGN rated the episode 8 out of 10, noting that "political correctness in comedy is sort of a divisive issue". Busch enjoyed Mary "spouting groaner lines" and compared her to Pierce Hawthorne from Community, saying "the funny thing about [Pierce] is how offensive he is."

Oliver Sava of The A.V. Club gave the episode a B, saying that "this episode's biggest failing is not having Amy and Mary share a scene".

The episode was rated 42 out of 100 by the TV critic; it was said to be "dull" and "stasis", with Mary's insistence on the gang praying described as "inappropriate". According to the critic, the political incorrectness from Mary was "predictable and basic" and although "Sheldon's refusal to change did feel believable", it was "a bit of a waste of time".
