= None Pizza with Left Beef =

2007 internet meme

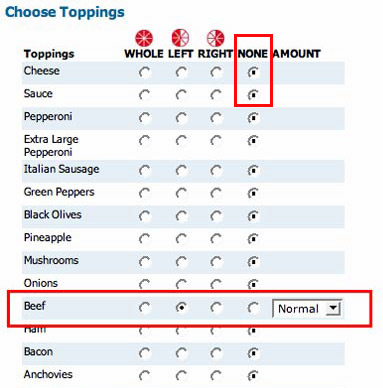
Molaro's order and the pizza received

None Pizza with Left Beef was a pizza delivery experiment conducted by American television producer and writer Steven Molaro in October 2007. After testing the accuracy and permissiveness of the then-new Domino's online ordering system, the results were posted on his blog, The Sneeze, after which it evolved into an internet meme.

== Background ==
On October 18, 2007, Steven Molaro was experimenting with the Domino's pizza-ordering website, specifically testing the accuracy of ordering pizza toppings on the "left" versus "right", as seen when opening the pizza box. Using the site's radio buttons, he ordered two pizzas. The first, with pepperoni on the left and mushrooms on the right, arrived correctly partitioned, though reversed from the specific left–right orientation he had ordered. The second was a six-inch (15 cm) pizza with no sauce, no cheese, and beef only on the left side of the pizza; while correctly absent of the typical base elements, Molaro said, "the whole pizza was so small and light it must have shifted during delivery. And the little beef pellets didn't have any sauce or cheese to hang on to, so a few lost their footing from the left half."

Molaro described the second pizza itself as "tasteless bread with salty meat pellets", though his wife did eat it, an act he said he supposed testified to some level of quality and edibleness. On October 19, he published a comedic post about the experiment on his blog, The Sneeze, where he named the order "NONE Pizza with Left Beef".

When trying to explain his rationale many years later, Molaro compared it to "when kids get a toy, they play with it for a while and then start messing around with it in other weird ways." Ordering pizza online was then a novel experience, and he sought to push the limits of what it would allow.

== Analysis ==
Molaro's post, "The Great Pizza Orientation Test", rapidly became very popular. Most readers enjoyed the post, but he later recalled pedantic negative feedback about the relativity of pizzas' halves—something he had addressed in the original post.

On the ten-year anniversary of Molaro's original post, Gizmodo reflected on how None Pizza with Left Beef was a vanguard for many humorous restaurant orders to come, and its evolution into an internet meme: continuing to resonate within internet culture, commerce, and beyond after ten years with a photo "that won our hearts—even if it wasn't exactly delivered to spec." It was the source of the later "special delivery" meme.

One of the reasons Molaro ordered online was to avoid interacting with Dominos' staff. New York took the ten-year anniversary as an opportunity to lightheartedly reflect on human–automation interaction, as well as the legacy of None Pizza with Left Beef; the magazine argued that the lack of a human intermediary is required for placing such humorous and viral food orders: when ordering a cheeseburger from McDonald's, whether removing all ingredients except the cheese, or paying GB£0.99 (equivalent to £1.32 or US$1.79 in 2025) after eschewing all the ingredients, these experiments in compliance would not be successful with a restaurant employee.

In a 2021 Esquire article about pizza toppings and terminology, the magazine called None Pizza with Left Beef "a corporate (yet hilarious!) monstrosity". Domino's first acknowledged the meme in an April 2022 tweet: "If you remember None Pizza Left Beef [sic], it's time for an eye cream."

By the 15th anniversary in 2022, choosing to remove pizza sauce or cheese from an online Domino's order would prompt a warning for the user. The original meme had since been immortalized as a custom emoji, embroidery, jewelry, stickers, and t-shirts. Molaro himself claimed to be unsure why it still resonated with people, but stated how for some commenters it seems to harken back to an ostensibly better time on the internet. When he ordered a duplicate pizza on the occasion of the 15th anniversary, it came looking much like it did in 2007, including the misalignment of the beef.
