= The Russian Rocket Reaction =

- The Big Bang Theory episode
- Episode no.: Season 5 Episode 5
- Directed by: Mark Cendrowski
- Story by: Bill Prady; Steven Molaro; Jim Reynolds
- Teleplay by: Chuck Lorre; Eric Kaplan; Maria Ferrari
- Production code: 3X6855
- Original air date: October 13, 2011

Guest appearances
- Brent Spiner as himself; Wil Wheaton as himself; Kevin Sussman as Stuart Bloom; Carol Ann Susi as Mrs. Wolowitz

Episode chronology
← Previous "The Wiggly Finger Catalyst"	Next → "The Rhinitis Revelation"
- The Big Bang Theory season 5

"The Russian Rocket Reaction" is the fifth episode of the fifth season of The Big Bang Theory and the 92nd episode overall. It first aired on CBS on October 13, 2011.

The episode features guest appearances by recurring character Wil Wheaton and Star Trek: The Next Generation actor Brent Spiner. In the subplot, Wil Wheaton invites Leonard (Johnny Galecki) and Sheldon (Jim Parsons) to a party that Brent Spiner attends. The main plot focuses on Howard (Simon Helberg) finding out he is going to the International Space Station.

== Plot ==
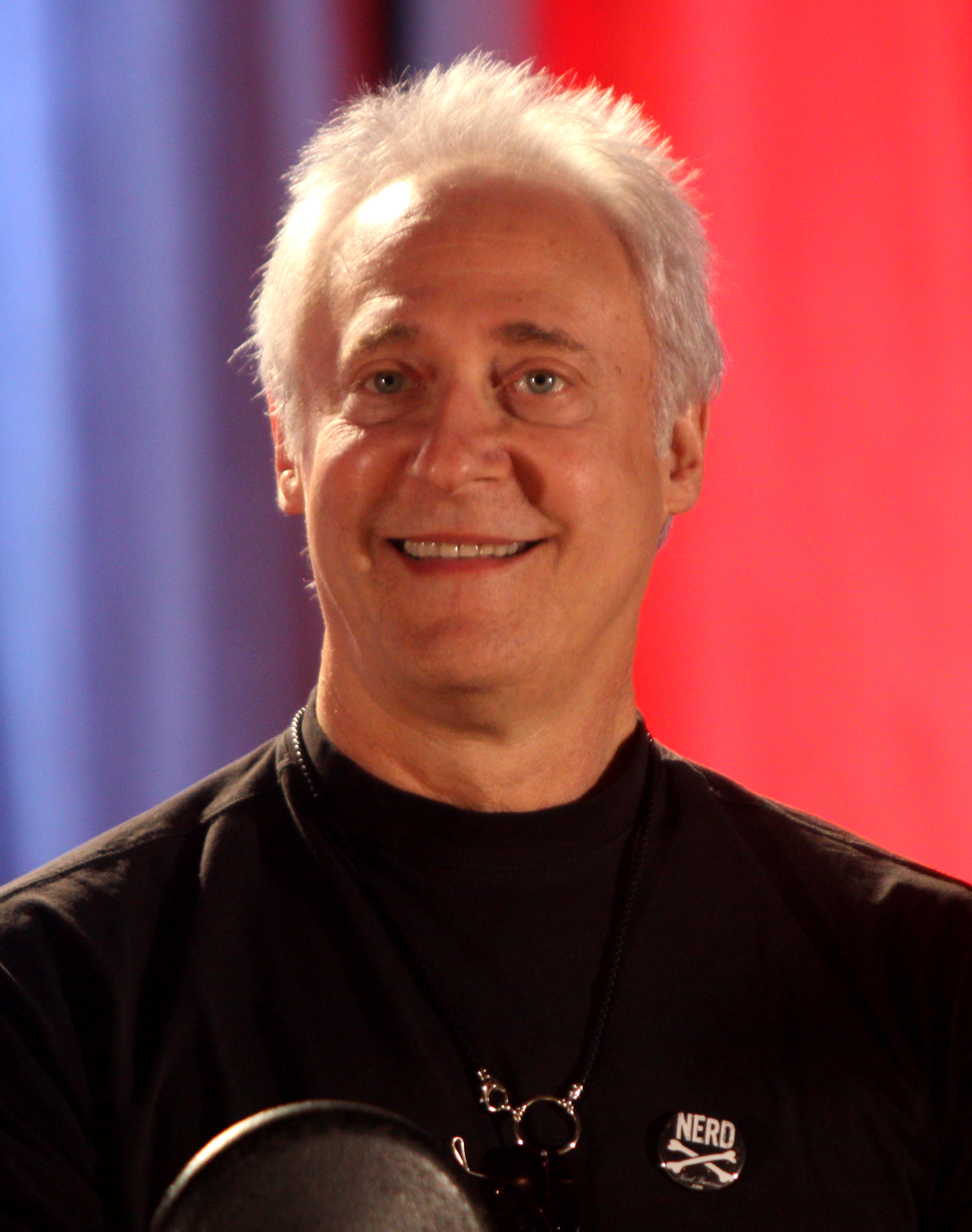
Brent Spiner appears briefly at Wil Wheaton's party.

NASA selects a deep field space telescope designed by Howard's team to go on the International Space Station (ISS). Howard is told he is going to the ISS with the telescope as a payload specialist. As NASA no longer has a Shuttle, Howard will go on the Russian Soyuz and jokes about its safety by referencing the Chernobyl disaster. Bernadette is upset that Howard accepted the astronaut job without consulting her. Her father was a member of the police and as a child, she was always worried about him dying on the job. She tells Howard's mother, who forbids him from going to space. Later, when talking to Penny and Amy, Bernadette realizes she made a mistake. She apologizes to Howard, although his mother still refuses to let him go into space.

As Sheldon and Leonard start a sword collection with a replica of a sword from Game of Thrones, Wil Wheaton arrives at the comic book store and invites them to a party; while Leonard wants to go, Sheldon still considers Wheaton a mortal enemy. Sheldon says that Leonard is both his friend and not his friend, until he either goes or does not go to the party: he calls this "Schrödinger's friendship", in a reference to Schrödinger's cat. Upset, he compares Leonard's "betrayal" to turning R2-D2 and C-3PO over to the Empire. Leonard is about to leave for Wheaton's party but gets a text that Brent Spiner will be at the party. He tells Sheldon, who pretends not to care but later attends, aiming to fix their friendship and meet Spiner. Wheaton gives Sheldon a signed Wesley Crusher action figure, remorseful for not attending the convention Sheldon waited to meet him at during his childhood. Sheldon excitedly forgives Wheaton but Spiner opens up the figure's packaging, horrifying Sheldon. Though Spiner offers to sign a Data doll, Sheldon declares him his "mortal enemy".

== Reception ==
=== Ratings ===
On the night of its first U.S. broadcast on October 13, 2011 (Tuesday) at 8 p.m., the episode was watched by 13.58 million households. It received a Nielsen rating of 4.6/14 between viewers aged 18–49. Airing alongside the first 30 minutes of The X Factor and episodes of Community, The Vampire Diaries and Charlie's Angels, the episode was most watched in its timeslot. The X Factor was the only other show in the timeslot that had over 5 million viewers (it garnered 10.828 million watchers). The episode was the most watched show on television that night.

The episodes airing before and after "The Russian Rocket Reaction" had more viewers. The previous episode, "The Wiggly Finger Catalyst", aired a week before and was watched by 13.92 million (0.34 million more than "The Russian Rocket Reaction). The following episode ("The Rhinitis Revelation") aired a week later and had 14.93 million viewers (1.35 million more).

In Canada, the episode aired on the same night and had 3.678 million viewers on CTV Total. It was the most watched TV show that week. In Australia, the episode originally aired on Nine Network on October 24, 2011 (Monday) at 8 p.m., gaining 1.369 million viewers. It had a nightly rank of 2 and a weekly rank of 5. In the United Kingdom, the episode premiered on November 24, 2011 on E4. It was watched by 1.215, and an hour later, 0.364 million watched it on E4 +1. It was most and second most watched on the channels, respectively, that week. Overall, it was watched by 1.579 million and was ranked fifth on cable that week.

=== Reviews ===
Big Bang Theory is at its best when it finds a way to both exploit and glorify the absurdity of hardcore nerds, and the Wil Wheaton plot, combined with the emotional hook of the Bernadette/Howard story, shows that the writers can still craft scripts with brains and heart.

— Oliver Sava of The A.V. Club

Oliver Sava of The A.V. Club gave the episode a rating of A−, describing it as "steeped in nerd culture". Sava said "Melissa Rauch and Simon Helberg have great chemistry" when talking about the main plot and enjoyed the subplot as well.

The episode was rated 53 out of 100 by "the TV Critic". The episode was said to be likeable "on paper" but that "in execution", it was an "odd story". The opening scene was described as "a weird one", given Sheldon developing his social skills and Leonard's politeness. The critic also said "I was sad to see the evil Will [sic] Wheaton character dispensed with" and summarized that "the actual script let everyone down".

Jenna Busch of IGN rated the episode 8.5 out of 10. Busch described the parallel of spats between Howard/Bernadette and Leonard/Sheldon as "a bit of a contrived plot", but said that "the Shrodinger's cat storyline was hysterical". Busch's only issues "were the lack of AFF [Amy Farrah Fowler] and Raj".

Carla Day from TV Fanatic rated the episode 4.5 out of 5. Day enjoyed when "Howard showed his maturity" and had mixed reactions to Sheldon and Wil's rivalry ending, saying that it was "comedic gold" and hoping that "we'll see more of Wil Wheaton". Wheaton has since appeared in several The Big Bang Theory episodes.
