= The Fish Guts Displacement =

- The Big Bang Theory episode
- Episode no.: Season 6 Episode 10
- Directed by: Mark Cendrowski
- Story by: Chuck Lorre; Bill Prady; Tara Hernandez
- Teleplay by: Steven Molaro; Jim Reynolds; Eric Kaplan
- Original air date: December 6, 2012

Guest appearances
- Casey Sander as Mike Rostenkowski; Meagen Fay as Mrs. Rostenkowski

Episode chronology
← Previous "The Parking Spot Escalation"	Next → "The Santa Simulation"
- The Big Bang Theory season 6

"The Fish Guts Displacement" is the tenth episode of the sixth season of the American comedy television series The Big Bang Theory. The episode was originally aired on the CBS television network on December 6, 2012. The story was created by Chuck Lorre, Bill Prady, and Tara Hernandez, and turned into a teleplay by Steven Molaro, Jim Reynolds, and Eric Kaplan. Mark Cendrowski directed the episode.

"The Fish Guts Displacement" received positive reviews from the critics. In the U.S., this episode was viewed by 16.94 million viewers and received a 5.2/16 percent rating among the adults between the ages of 18 and 49, ranking first in its timeslot, and it was also ranked first in the whole night.

== Synopsis ==
Howard is forced to have his in-laws over for dinner. Bernadette volunteers him to go on a fishing trip with her macho father. Howard has no clue how to fish, so he enlists Penny to teach him. Howard, Leonard and Raj all find handling the worms and preparing dead fish to be disgusting. Howard eventually tells Bernadette's father, Mike, that he does not want to go fishing and discovers that Mike does not want to go either, admitting that his wife makes him go fishing often. They bond over being bossed around by the women in their lives and then the two of them decide to go to a casino instead and Mike offers to teach him to play craps.

Meanwhile, Sheldon is forced to take care of Amy when she gets sick, thanks to a special clause he built into their Relationship Agreement. He takes care of her the way his mother did by putting a damp cloth on her forehead, singing to her, bathing her and rubbing VapoRub on her chest, which excites Amy. He also reads to her from a science textbook as if it were a bedtime story. She loves the extra attention so much that she continues to pretend to be sick even after she has recovered.

When Sheldon finally discovers that Amy tricked him, he tells her that his father would have spanked him for the ruse she has pulled (he thinks of corporal punishment), and though he does not want to hurt her, the idea excites Amy (she thinks of erotic spanking). She plays mood music before receiving the first spank, and is excited after receiving it. Sheldon tells her she should not be enjoying her punishment; she responds that he should spank harder, which he agrees.

== Broadcast and reception ==
=== Ratings ===
"The Fish Guts Displacement" originally aired on CBS on December 6, 2012. The episode was watched by 16.94 million viewers and received a 5.2/16 percent rating among the adults between the ages of 18 and 49. It was top in its timeslot, ahead of the Fox Network's reality television singing competition The X Factor which received a 2.5/7 percent rating and an episode of the ABC drama series Last Resort, which received a 1.2/4 percent rating. The Big Bang Theory was also the highest rated television show of the night.

=== Reception ===
Jesse Schedeen from IGN gave this episode an 8.3/10 and called this episode "a new romantic milestone for Sheldon and Amy". Jesse praised "Some clever subversion of typical sitcom gender roles" and "Plenty of funny awkwardness at Casa de Wolowitz" in this episode. However, Jesse also said that "the Sheldon/Amy plot ended on a creepy note", he thought "Raj deserves more varied material", too.

Oliver Sava from The A.V. Club gave this episode a B. She praised the Howard storyline, and said "when the writers put [Howard's marriage] at the forefront, the episodes are fresher and have a stronger emotional hook". She also felt that the Sheldon and Amy storyline was OK, but the last scene that shows Sheldon spanking Amy was kinky and creepy to her.

Mayim Bialik submitted this episode for consideration due to her nomination for the Primetime Emmy Award for Outstanding Supporting Actress in a Comedy Series at the 65th Primetime Emmy Awards.
