= The Wiggly Finger Catalyst =

- The Big Bang Theory episode
- Episode no.: Season 5 Episode 4
- Directed by: Mark Cendrowski
- Story by: Chuck Lorre; Steven Molaro; Dave Goetsch
- Teleplay by: Bill Prady; Jim Reynolds; Steve Holland
- Production code: 3X6854
- Original air date: October 6, 2011

Guest appearances
- Katie Leclerc as Emily; Brian George as Dr. Koothrappalli; Alice Amter as Mrs. Koothrappalli

Episode chronology
← Previous "The Pulled Groin Extrapolation"	Next → "The Russian Rocket Reaction"
- The Big Bang Theory season 5

"The Wiggly Finger Catalyst" is the fourth episode of the fifth season of The Big Bang Theory that first aired on CBS on October 6, 2011. It is the 91st episode overall.

== Plot ==
Sheldon, Leonard, Howard and Raj are playing a game of Dungeons & Dragons, but Leonard becomes concerned when Raj eats a whole pie and states he has no reason to watch his figure as he is not in a relationship. Across the hall, Penny, Bernadette and Amy are also discussing Raj's loneliness. Penny introduces Raj to her deaf friend Emily. Though Raj's selective mutism is not an issue, Penny calls Howard to interpret Emily's sign language to Raj. The two go out on a date at a coffee shop, and with Howard's help, the date goes reasonably well.

One month later, Howard reveals that Raj is buying Emily many expensive gifts, with Sheldon saying he can do so as his family is rich. Concerned that Emily is exploiting Raj for his wealth, Penny and Howard confront her at her gym. Howard gets distracted by the women there and asks Emily straight up if she is a gold digger, causing an angry Emily to swear at them and storm off. Raj, angry over the ambush, confronts Penny and accuses her of being jealous ever since they slept together.

Determined to break the two up, Penny calls Raj's parents and informs them of the situation. They threaten to cut him off if he continues to date her. A defiant Raj refuses to break up with Emily, but once she discovers he is no longer rich and that he has to return the gifts he bought her, she dumps him. The guys then go to the Cheesecake Factory and make Raj pay for everyone's meal, with Penny telling him not to "cheap out" on the tip, since they now know he is rich.

Meanwhile, Sheldon uses Dungeons & Dragons dice to make trivial decisions, such as what to order in a restaurant, so his mind can focus more on his work. Although he manages to co-author two papers and make considerable progress towards explaining why the Large Hadron Collider has not yet isolated the Higgs boson particle, he grows a ridiculous-looking mustache, gets chafed testicles from not wearing underwear and has to wait to use the restroom when he needs to urinate.

== Reception ==
=== Ratings ===
On the night of its first broadcast on October 6, 2011, the episode was watched by 13.92 million households in the U.S. It received a Nielsen rating of 4.5/14 for viewers aged 18–49 and beat all other episodes in its timeslot. It also received more viewers than any other show on CBS airing that night.

In Canada, the episode aired on the same night on CTV Total and received 3.283 million views, giving it a weekly ranking of 1.

In Australia, the episode aired on Nine Network on October 16, 2011, and was watched by 1.551 million households. It was the most watched television show that night and third most watched that week.

In the United Kingdom, the episode first aired on November 17, 2011, on E4. It received 1.025 million viewers on E4 and 0.316 million when it aired on E4 +1, for a total of 1.341 million viewers. It had ranks of second and first that week for the channels, respectively, and received a rank of ninth on cable overall.

=== Reviews ===
Robin Pierson of The TV Critic rated the episode 67 out of 100. Oliver Sava of The A.V. Club gave the episode a D+. Jenna Busch of IGN rated it 7/10 and wrote that "the sub-plot was actually funnier than the main storyline".
