= Meagen Fay =

American actress

- Born: Joliet, Illinois, U.S.
- Occupation: Actress
- Years active: 1979–present
- Spouse: William Gunther (m. 1993)

Meagen Fay is an American actress known for her work in television. She is best known as Roxy in Ohara (1987–1988), Principal Halloron in Life with Louie (1995–1998), Gretchen Mannkusser in Malcolm in the Middle (2002–2004) and Rhonda in Loot (2022).

== Career ==
Born and raised in Joliet, Illinois, Fay was a featured cast member with Chicago's The Second City in the early 1980s.

Fay's first television role was in the 1987 television series Ohara.

She has guest-starred on numerous shows including Thirtysomething, Roseanne, Mad About You, Boy Meets World, Seinfeld, Dharma & Greg, Gilmore Girls, Suddenly Susan, Charmed and Freaks and Geeks. She starred in Carol & Company, The Home Court, Tales of the City, and Woops!, as well as appearing in Magnolia (1999). In 2004, she starred in Stephen King's Kingdom Hospital.

She has also had recurring roles on Malcolm in the Middle and The Bernie Mac Show, and has guest starred on Six Feet Under, Nip/Tuck, Desperate Housewives, The Big Bang Theory, and as Chelsea's mother on several episodes of Two and a Half Men.

She made her directorial debut with playwright Jeffrey Sweet's play Kunstler at the 59 East 59 Theaters in Manhattan.

== Personal life ==
Fay married William Gunther, a camera operator, in January 1993.

== Filmography ==
=== Film ===
| Year | Title | Role | Notes |
|---|---|---|---|
| 1988 | Dirty Rotten Scoundrels | Lady from Oklahoma | |
| 1991 | Barton Fink | Poppy Carnahan | |
| 1992 | Big Girls Don't Cry... They Get Even | Mom | |
| 1993 | Rising Sun | Hamaguri receptionist | |
| 1994 | Love Affair | SSA flight attendant | |
| 1997 | Fathers' Day | Megan | |
| 1999 | Magnolia | Dr. Diane | |
| 2002 | Full Frontal | Diane | |
| 2002 | The Country Bears | Mrs. Barrington | |
| 2004 | Catch That Kid | Doctor | |
| 2004 | Home of Phobia | Mrs. Paul | |
| 2005 | Extreme Dating | Detective Branson | |
| 2007 | Evan Almighty | Neighbor | |
| 2008 | Mad Money | Mindy Arbogast | |
| 2008 | Extreme Movie | Len's Mom | |
| 2009 | Wake | Mrs. Williams | |
| 2009 | Halloween II | Deputy Lyons | |
| 2009 | I Hope They Serve Beer in Hell | Mrs. Jorgens | |
| 2012 | That's My Boy | Helen Martin | |
| 2013 | The Pretty One | Mrs. Matthews | |
| 2014 | Authors Anonymous | Maureen | |
| 2015 | Entourage | Larsen's Secretary | |
| 2015 | To Keep the Light | Mrs. Williams | |
| 2016 | La La Land | Mia's Mom | |

=== Television ===
| Year | Title | Role | Notes |
|---|---|---|---|
| 1983 | The Yesterday Show | | |
| 1984 | The Imposter | | TV movie |
| 1987–1988 | Ohara | Roxy Baldwin | |
| 1989 | Your Mother Wears Combat Boots | Edie Winchell | TV movie |
| 1989 | Alien Nation | Coroner Barkley | 2 episodes |
| 1990–1991 | Carol & Company | | |
| 1991 | The Carol Burnett Show | | |
| 1991–1992 | Roseanne | Kathy Bowman | 4 episodes |
| 1992 | Woops! | Alice McConnell | |
| 1992 | Mad About You | Connie | 2 episodes |
| 1994 | Tales of the City | Binky Gruen | |
| 1994 | Locals | Rita Levine | |
| 1994 | The First Gentleman | Rosie Duff | |
| 1995–1996 | The Home Court | Greer | |
| 1995–1998 1998 | Life with Louie Dharma and Greg | Principal Halloran Kim | Voice Episode “It Takes A Village” |
| 1996 | Love and Marriage | Trudy Begg | |
| 1996 | Seinfeld | Mrs. Burns | Episode: "The Abstinence" |
| 1997 | Over the Top | Mrs. Hampstead | Episode: "The Bee Story" |
| 1999 | Boy Meets World | Judy Haberfeld | Episode: "They're Killing Us" |
| 2000 | Diagnosis: Murder | Connie Carmichael | Episode: "Too Many Cooks" |
| 2000 | Freaks and Geeks | Mrs. Kentner | Episode: "Dead Dogs and Gym Teachers" |
| 2000 | Gilmore Girls | Mrs. Shales | Episode; "Kill Me Now" |
| 2001 | 3rd Rock from the Sun | Annabet | Episode: "Mary Loves Scoochie: (Part 1)" |
| 2002–2004 | Malcolm in the Middle | Gretchen Mannkusser | 11 episodes |
| 2004 | Kingdom Hospital | Dr. Brenda Abelson | 7 episodes |
| 2005 | Desperate Housewives | Norma Harper | Episode: "Color and Light" |
| 2006 | Charmed | Nanta | Episode: "Mr. and Mrs Witch" |
| 2006 | Hollis & Rae | Winnie | TV movie |
| 2007–2008 | According to Jim | Susan Karp | Episode: "Coach Jim" |
| 2007 | How I Met Your Mother | Janice Aldrin | 2 episodes |
| 2007 | CSI: Crime Scene Investigation | Rochelle Dorley | Episode: "Living Doll" |
| 2007 | Big Love | Laura Tuttle | 2 episodes |
| 2007 | State of Mind | Bonnie Cheuse | Episode: "Lost & Found" |
| 2007 | Species: The Awakening | Celeste | Television film |
| 2008 | Single with Parents | Nancy | Unaired pilot |
| 2009–2010 | Two and a Half Men | Martha | 2 episodes |
| 2010 | Party Down | Nora Doyle | Episode: "Precious Lights Pre-School Auction" |
| 2010 | Chase | Mrs. McGraw | Episode: "The Posse" |
| 2011 | Good Luck Charlie | Claire | Episode: "Snow Show: Part 1" |
| 2011 | Happy Endings | Barbara | Episode: "Why Can't You Read Me?" |
| 2011 | Free Agents | Dorothy Potter | Episode: "Rebranding" |
| 2012 | Franklin & Bash | Sharon Wright | Episode: "Last Dance" |
| 2012 | Retired at 35 | Joanne | Episode: "The Apartment" |
| 2012 | The Neighbors | Principal Birker | Episode: "Bathroom Etiquette" |
| 2012 | The Big Bang Theory | Mrs. Rostenkowski | Episode: "The Fish Guts Displacement" |
| 2012 | Strawberry Summer (Hallmark name) Easy Heart (Pixl name) | Mimi Henderson | |
| 2013 | The Mentalist | Joanne Parsons | Episode: "Red and Itchy" |
| 2013 | Don't Trust the B— in Apartment 23 | Katherine | Episode: "The Original B—" |
| 2014 | Murder in the First | Joanna Gibbs | 2 episodes |
| 2014 | Friends with Better Lives | Frances Bowmont | Episode: "The Deceivers" |
| 2015–2016 | Transparent | Blossie | 3 episodes |
| 2015 | Agent Carter | Miriam Fry | 4 episodes |
| 2015 | Mad Men | Sharon Hill | Episode: "The Milk and Honey Route" |
| 2015 | The Muppets | Holly | 2 episodes |
| 2016 | The Ranch | Priscilla | Episode: "There Goes My Life" |
| 2016 | Good Girls Revolt | Bea Burkhart | 3 episodes |
| 2017 | Salem | Mrs. Stoughton | Episode: "Night's Black Agents" |
| 2017 | Shrink | Renetta | 8 episodes |
| 2017 | Bones | Judge Celia Stockwell | Episode: "The Day in the Life" |
| 2017 | Dr. Ken | Virginia | 2 episodes |
| 2017 | Criminal Minds | Irene Jacobs | Episode: "The Bunker" |
| 2018, 2020 | Superstore | Marilyn Simms | 2 episodes |
| 2018 | Titans | Nun | 2 episodes |
| 2019 | The Conners | Austin's grandmother | Episode: "A Kiss is Just a Kiss" |
| 2020 | Supernatural | Mrs. Butters | Episode: "Last Holiday" |
| 2021 | Hightown | Linda Murphy | 2 episodes |
| 2021 | Dopesick | Sister Beth Davies | 2 episodes |
| 2022–present | Loot | Rhonda | Series regular (season 2); Recurring cast (season 1) |
| 2022 | Ghosts | Debbie | Episode: "Spies" |
| 2026 | Malcolm in the Middle: Life's Still Unfair | Gretchen Mannkusser | Episode: "Episode Four" |

=== Stage ===
| Year | Title | Role | Venue | Notes |
|---|---|---|---|---|
| 1980–81 | Well, I'm Off to the Thirty Years War or Swing Your Partner to the Right | | Chicago Mainstage | |
| 1981–82 | Miro, Miro on the Wall | | Chicago Mainstage | |
| 1982 | Glenna Loved It or If You Knew Sushi | | Chicago Mainstage | |
| 1982–83 | Exit Pursued by a Bear | | Chicago Mainstage | |
| 1983 | Also Available in Paperback – A Retrospective | | Chicago Mainstage | |
| 1983–85 | Orwell That Ends Well | | Chicago Mainstage, The Village Gate | Second City production |
| 1986 | Twelfth Night; or, What You Will | Maria | New York Shakespeare Festival, The Public Theater, Delacorte Theater | |
| 1987 | Stepping Out | Vera | John Golden Theatre | |
| 1995 | I Sent a Letter to My Love | Miss Morgan | Primary Stages Theatre | |
| 1999 | Merton of the Movies | Casting director | Geffen Playhouse | |
| 2000 | Bluff | | Coronet Theatre | Staged reading |
| 2003 | To Be Young, Gifted and Black | Mavis | | |
