= The Sneeze (blog) =

Blog written by Steven Molaro

- Website type: News
- Owner: Steven Molaro
- Website: http://thesneeze.com/
- Current status: Active

The Sneeze is a blog written by Steven Molaro, identified on the site only as "Steve" of Los Angeles, California. In 2005 the site was listed among the "top 101 websites" by PC Magazine, and won a Blogger's Choice Award. The site gained attention for its "Steve, Don't Eat It!" section, a series of episodes in which Steve consumes various odd or unpleasant foods, including potted meat, cuitlacoche, nattō, and human breast milk.

The Sneeze's tagline is "Half zine. Half blog. Half not good with fractions." The first post was on June 28, 2003. Steve is married and has two sons, aged three and seven as of May 2007. Blog posts often feature humorous or surreal conversations with the younger of the two boys. Steve has also blogged about the perennial growth of a bizarre "tree brain", or sulfur shelf fungus, on a tree outside his house.

Steve has interviewed Adam Savage of MythBusters, animator and director Savage Steve Holland, and actor and comedian Don Novello, best known for his Saturday Night Live character Father Guido Sarducci. He is friends with the band Cloud Cult and Brian Rosenworcel of Guster, as well as Natalie Dee and Drew of Toothpaste for Dinner, and the writers of Retrocrush and Cockeyed.com. In November 2003, Steve was interviewed by Derek and Romaine of SIRIUS OutQ radio.

On May 5, 2008, Steve announced a hiatus of The Sneeze for personal reasons. On July 14, 2008, however, Steve declared the return of The Sneeze. On May 4, 2009, Steve started using Twitter for The Sneeze updates and has blogged infrequently since.

As of 2013 Steve works as a writer and executive producer on the television show The Big Bang Theory.

At some point, most of the content on The Sneeze official website had been taken down, including the "Steve, don't eat it!" section, eventually being replaced with the words "Best of The Sneeze - a work in progress." As of October 2025 the "Steve, don't eat it!" greats, including Potted Meat Food Product and Breast Milk have all returned, along with more from The Sneeze Archives. Steve is also uploading new content again, saying "Eventually I thought, “If The Sneeze still existed I would put this on there.” So, thanks to some bad Vietnamese food and a cookie company that is pro-cleavage, we’re back."
