= Sheldon Cooper =

Fictional character in The Big Bang Theory and Young Sheldon

- The Big Bang Theory and Young Sheldon character
- Jim Parsons as adult Sheldon Cooper (left) and Iain Armitage as young Sheldon Cooper
- First appearance: "Pilot"; The Big Bang Theory; September 24, 2007
- Last appearance: "Memoir"; Young Sheldon; May 16, 2024
- Created by: Chuck Lorre; Bill Prady
- Portrayed by: Jim Parsons (The Big Bang Theory); Iain Armitage (Young Sheldon)
- Voiced by: Jim Parsons (narration; Young Sheldon)

In-universe information
- Full name: Dr. Sheldon Lee Cooper
- Nicknames: Shelly (by his mother); Moonpie (by his grandmother)
- Gender: Male
- Title: Doctor
- Occupation: The Big Bang Theory: Theoretical physicist; Young Sheldon: Student
- Family: George Cooper Sr. (father, deceased); Mary Cooper (mother); George "Georgie" Cooper Jr. (brother); Melissa "Missy" Cooper (twin sister)
- Spouse: Amy Farrah Fowler (m. 2018)
- Children: Leonard Cooper; Unnamed daughter
- Relatives: Constance "Connie" Tucker (grandmother); Charlie "Pop-Pop" Tucker (grandfather, deceased); Constance "CeeCee" Cooper (niece); Amanda "Mandy" McAllister (former sister-in-law)
- Origin: Galveston, Texas
- Nationality: American

Sheldon Lee Cooper, BS, MS, MA, PhD, ScD, is a fictional character and one of the main protagonists in the 2007–2019 CBS television series The Big Bang Theory and the titular main protagonist of its 2017–2024 spin-off series Young Sheldon, portrayed by actors Jim Parsons and Iain Armitage respectively (with Parsons as the latter series' narrator). For his portrayal, Parsons received widespread acclaim and won four Primetime Emmy Awards, a Golden Globe Award, a TCA Award, and two Critics' Choice Television Awards. The character's childhood is the focus of Young Sheldon, in which he grows up as a child prodigy in Medford, Texas with his family: his twin sister Missy Cooper, his father George Cooper Sr., his older brother George Marshall Cooper Jr., his mother Mary Cooper, and his grandmother, Constance Tucker (also known as Connie or Meemaw).

The adult Sheldon is a senior theoretical physicist at the California Institute of Technology (Caltech), and for the first ten seasons of The Big Bang Theory shares an apartment with his colleague and best friend, Leonard Hofstadter (Johnny Galecki); they are also friends and coworkers with Howard Wolowitz (Simon Helberg) and Rajesh Koothrappali (Kunal Nayyar). In season 10, Sheldon moves across the hall with his girlfriend Amy Farrah Fowler (Mayim Bialik), in the former apartment of Leonard's wife Penny (Kaley Cuoco).

He has a genius-level IQ of 187; however, he displays a fundamental lack of social skills, a tenuous understanding of humor, and difficulty recognizing irony and sarcasm in other people, although he himself often employs them and uses sarcasm often in daily conversations. The antihero of the series, he exhibits highly idiosyncratic behavior and a general lack of humility, empathy, and toleration. These characteristics provide the majority of the humor involving him, which are credited with making him the show's breakout character. Some viewers have asserted that Sheldon's personality is consistent with autism spectrum disorder (or what used to be classified as Asperger's syndrome). Co-creator Bill Prady has stated that Sheldon's character was neither conceived nor developed with regard to Asperger's, although Parsons has said that in his opinion, Sheldon "couldn't display more facets" of Asperger's syndrome.

== Creation and casting ==
The character of Sheldon Cooper was inspired by a computer programmer personally known to series co-creator Bill Prady. He and his friend Leonard Hofstadter are named in honor of actor/producer Sheldon Leonard, scientist Robert Hofstadter, and Nobel Prize Laureate Leon Cooper. Chuck Lorre originally intended Johnny Galecki to play the role, but Galecki thought he would be "better suited" for the character of Leonard. Lorre said that when Jim Parsons auditioned for the role, he was "so startlingly good" that he was asked to re-audition "to make sure he hadn't gotten lucky".

== Characterization ==
=== Early life ===
Sheldon and his fraternal twin sister, Missy, were born on February 26, 1980, at a Kmart in Galveston, Texas, and raised in Medford, a fictional small town in East Texas that is a three-hour drive from Dallas, along with their older brother, George Jr., by their mother, Mary Cooper, an overtly devout Baptist, and their father, George Cooper Sr., a high school football coach. His first word was 'hypotenuse'; he said this at four months old. Sheldon once got his father fired when he told Mr. Hinckley, a store owner, that George was stealing from the cash register. In Young Sheldon, this is retconned: his father is a football coach who was fired from his coaching position in Galveston because he disclosed that other coaches were illegally recruiting players to their school, forcing the family to return to Medford. He does drink, mostly beer, and is a loving father who is trying to understand his intellectually gifted son. The only member of his family to have actively encouraged his work in science was his maternal grandfather, whom he cherished and affectionately called "Pop-Pop", and who died when Sheldon was five years old. Pop-Pop's loss is what caused Sheldon to not like Christmas very much when his Christmas wish to bring Pop-Pop back did not come true. Sheldon's closest relative is his maternal grandmother whom he affectionately calls "Meemaw", and who in turn calls him "Moon Pie". His aunt was also said to have encouraged his work in science by giving him medical equipment, "in case his work in physics failed, he'd have a 'trade' to fall back on". In Young Sheldon, it is shown that his childhood friend Tam was the one who introduced him to non-scientific interests such as comic books and Dungeons & Dragons.

Sheldon was interested in science from an early age, and was a child prodigy, although due to his behavioral quirks and his lack of humility about his superior intellect, he was bullied by classmates and neighbors. Sheldon entered college at the age of eleven, and at age fourteen he graduated from college summa cum laude. Throughout the entire run of The Big Bang Theory, the college he went to for undergraduate studies had not been revealed, but he always felt it was superior to his fellow Big Bang Theory colleagues' alma maters of Princeton (Leonard), Cambridge (Raj), MIT (Howard) and Harvard (Amy); however, it is implied in "The Tam Turbulence" (Season 12, Episode 4) that Sheldon is in fact a Caltech alumnus, and in Young Sheldon he is said to enroll at the fictional East Texas Tech before finally enrolling at Caltech in the final episodes of the series. From then, he worked on his doctorate, was a visiting professor at the University of Heidelberg in Germany, was the youngest person at the time (fourteen and a half) to receive the Stevenson Award, and has appeared on the cover of Journal of Physical Chemistry A. Sheldon is now a theoretical physicist doing research at Caltech, although he stated in Young Sheldon that he could not see himself living in California due to their carefree lifestyles.

=== Personality ===
Like Leonard, Raj, and Howard, Sheldon is characterized as being highly intelligent, but he tends to display childish qualities, such as extreme stubbornness and meanness. It is claimed by Bernadette that the reason Sheldon is sometimes mean is because the part of his brain that tells him it is wrong to be mean is "getting a wedgie from the rest of his brain". However, in season 8's "The Space Probe Disintegration", Sheldon tearfully admits to Leonard that he is aware of how his behavior comes across. The first four episodes of The Big Bang Theory portray Sheldon slightly inconsistently with respect to his later characterization: according to Prady, the character "began to evolve after episode five or so and became his own thing".

Sheldon frequently states that he possesses an eidetic memory (although his powers of autobiographical recall are more like hyperthymesia) and an IQ of 187, although he claims his IQ cannot be accurately measured by normal tests. He originally claimed to have a master's degree and two doctoral degrees, but this list has increased. Sheldon possesses a mastery (and extensive knowledge) of various subjects such as physics, spectroscopy, radiology, chemistry, pharmacology, both anatomy and physiology, zoology, microbiology, astronomy, cosmology, algebra, geometry, calculus, trigonometry, economics, computers, software engineering, robotics/cybernetics, artificial intelligence, nanotechnology, history, anthropology, geography, linguistics, cryptography, forensics, vexillology (he hosts a webshow called Fun With Flags) and railroad engineering (he is a well-known railfan and a fancier of model trains), and in addition to being fluent in Klingon, has some knowledge of Swedish, Finnish, Mandarin, and Hindi. It is also revealed in Young Sheldon that he is proficient in Spanish, although that particular proficiency has apparently decreased by the time of The Big Bang Theory. He also shows great musical talent, knowing how to play the piano (as does Parsons in real life) and the theremin (which Parsons had learned to play in real life) and can sing with perfect pitch. Although his friends have similar intellects to him, his egocentrism and stubbornness frequently frustrate them. Sheldon occasionally uses slang (in a very unnatural fashion) and follows jokes with his catchphrase "Bazinga!", which is now an officially registered trademark of Warner Bros. He is uncomfortable with human physical contact and has mysophobia, which makes his exceptionally rare hugs extremely awkward and painful-looking. He also has hemophobia and synesthesia, the latter being demonstrated when he described prime numbers as being red, twin primes as being pink and smelling like gasoline and Fudgesicles as tasting like the speed of light. Sheldon has difficulty coping when asked to keep a secret, when he is interrupted, or when he hears arguing. He is also a notary public and uses his knowledge in law and contracts usually for his own advantage and is always distressed when challenged in a legal aspect that he cannot logically defend. In his mannerisms, Sheldon also shows symptoms associated with obsessive–compulsive personality disorder, as is suggested within the show itself by Amy in regard to how, whenever approaching the door of an occupied room—say the bathroom—he must knock three times, then say the person's name, and must repeat this three times; this was revealed as a result of him seemingly walking in on his father with another woman (although in reality it was just his mother roleplaying) when he was thirteen ("The first [knock] is traditional, but 'two' and 'three' are for people to get their pants on."). Upon entering a person's home, he must select the proper seat before sitting down. When it was suggested by Penny that he "just sit anywhere", his response is "Oh, no, if only it were that simple!" Because of his rigidity and stubbornness, only his mother and Bernadette, both possessing strong maternal personalities, have shown the ability to order him to do things. Like his friends, Sheldon is fond of comic books (mostly from the DC Universe), costumes, video games (he also mentions his ownership of various vintage games and systems), roleplaying games, tabletop games, collectible card games, and action figures. Sheldon has restraining orders from his heroes Leonard Nimoy, Carl Sagan, and Stan Lee, as well as television scientist Bill Nye and Zachary Quinto, as well as a restraining order against a neighbor on the fifth floor. Sheldon often wears vintage T-shirts adorned with superhero logos. One of his shirts is emblazoned with the number 73, and in the episode "The Alien Parasite Hypothesis" he explains that 73 is his favourite number because it is the 21st prime number, its mirror, 37, is the 12th prime number and its mirror (21) is the product of multiplying 7 and 3, also in binary, 73 is 1001001, a palindrome.

Sheldon has sometimes shown empathy, including lending money to Penny without expecting it back at all (although that may just have been his logical Spock-like response to a problem to be solved; it was, after all, money he was not using and would not miss) and driving her to a hospital when her shoulder was dislocated. In the season 6 episode "The Decoupling Fluctuation", Amy secretly tells him that Penny is considering breaking up with Leonard. Struggling to keep the secret from Leonard, Sheldon wakes up Penny in the middle of the night and asks her not to hurt his friend. In the Season 8 finale, he expresses his genuine happiness for Leonard and Penny when they decide to finally get married in Las Vegas (although his position was briefly reversed during the Season 9 premiere after he and Amy broke up). Since season 10, his empathy and caring attitude toward others have improved to the extent that he goes out of his way to pamper his fiancée Amy. Sheldon admits he is overly fond of koalas munching on eucalyptus so much that he has a facial expression that he refers to as his koala face. He dislikes gifts, because the "social convention" in his view creates either a debt or burden on the receiver of the gift which will not stop until one of the two involved in the "gift-relationship" dies leaving the other either in debt or with an undue surplus. Sheldon also does not take drugs, not even legal ones such as caffeine, due to a promise to his mother, and is hypersensitive when he accidentally consumes them. Alcohol often causes Sheldon to loosen up significantly, and it will cloud his judgment on occasion. After drinking alcoholic drinks (both deliberately and accidentally), he has done things that he would never do while sober, such as singing out loud, mooning an audience full of people, confronting Wil Wheaton, leaving wildly inappropriate voicemails after "drunk dialling" Stephen Hawking, and affectionately slapping Amy's rear. After consuming caffeine in the form of coffee or energy drinks, typically on the rare occasions that he has to work beyond his normal working hours to meet a deadline, he acts in a hyperactive, erratic manner.

In response to criticism from his friends that he is mentally ill, Sheldon often retorts, "I'm not crazy; my mother had me tested"; which his mother has confirmed to be true, once while wishing she had gone through with a follow-up examination.

=== Family ===
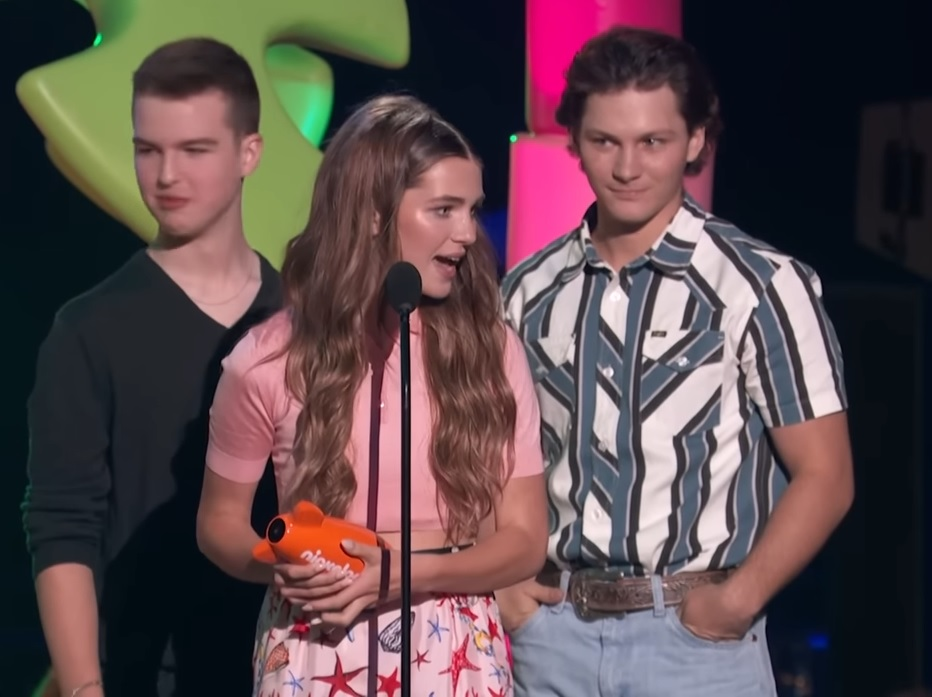
Young Sheldon cast portraying Sheldon and siblings in 2024

Sheldon contrasts strongly with his family, who are neither scientists nor intellectuals. His father George died of a heart attack while at work before the start of The Big Bang Theory, when Sheldon was 14, while his mother Mary is a devout Baptist and loving parent. Sheldon has two siblings: a younger twin sister, Missy, who is a tall, attractive brunette as an adult; and an older brother, George Jr., who owns a tire store chain headquartered in Dallas called Dr. Tire. The adult Sheldon has stated that both Missy and George Jr. beat up Sheldon during their childhoods, and their mother describes them to be "dumb as soup". In the pilot episode of The Big Bang Theory, Sheldon tells Leonard that DNA is not a guarantee of an intelligent offspring as he himself is a theoretical physicist and his twin sister is a hostess at Fuddruckers: in the series finale of Young Sheldon, he has a similar conversation with Amy regarding their children. Sheldon is very fond of his maternal grandmother, whom he calls "Meemaw" and who calls him "Moon Pie". He called his grandfather, who died when Sheldon was five, "Pop Pop". Sheldon was also very close to his grandfather, stating once that his grandfather was the only relative he had who encouraged him to become involved in science.

Sheldon has a maternal uncle, Edward, who is called "Stumpy" as the result of a time when he cleaned a woodchipper by hand. He also has a maternal aunt, Charlene, revealed in Young Sheldon when his mother told Meemaw that she made dinner for "Charlene and Edward" more times than she did. Sheldon had another uncle, Carl Cooper, who was killed by a badger while cleaning a chimney, and another uncle who may have done things to children that were legal in Oklahoma per "The Clean Room Infiltration".

In "The Engagement Reaction", Sheldon mentions that his aunt Ruth died a week after being infected by a pathogen she contracted in the hospital where she visited Sheldon's Uncle Roger and that their ashes are now stored in a coffee can on Sheldon's mother's mantle. Young Sheldon confirms that Ruth is George's sister and that she and Roger are still alive by 1990.

In the Young Sheldon episode "Vanilla Ice Cream, Gentleman Callers, and a Dinette Set", it is revealed that Sheldon has children in the future, but this is never referenced or confirmed in The Big Bang Theory. In the Young Sheldon episode "Graduation" (season 4 episode 1), Sheldon mentions his son, Leonard Cooper. He says that he wanted to name him Leonard Nimoy Cooper, but his wife Amy objected. In the Young Sheldon series finale, Sheldon is shown to also have a daughter (whose name is not revealed) with Amy; in the same episode, Sheldon and Amy's children were shown to have interests in non-academic fields, with Leonard taking up an interest in ice hockey and their daughter taking up an interest in acting, much to Sheldon's chagrin. In The Big Bang Theory, Sheldon did express an interest in having children with Amy, albeit an unfeasibly large number in order to serve as subjects for social or behavioral experiments.

=== Relationships ===
Sheldon's closest friends are Leonard Hofstadter, Howard Wolowitz, and Raj Koothrappali. Of the three, Sheldon is openly dismissive of Howard and constantly opines that a master's degree in engineering demonstrates a lesser intellect than that of the others, who all possess science doctorates. Despite that, Sheldon has referred to Howard as a "treasured acquaintance" and later his friend at various points. Sheldon constantly belittles Leonard and dismisses his work, yet at the same time considers Leonard his best friend, as they used to live together and can tolerate each other: in "The Space Probe Disintegration", Sheldon admits to Leonard that he is aware of how difficult he can be, and tearfully expresses his gratitude for having Leonard in his life in spite of himself, causing Leonard to break down beside him. Prady stated that "the fact that, despite everything, Leonard considers Sheldon his best friend reminds us of Sheldon's essential humanity".

Leonard has stated in the series that he and Sheldon have a dysfunctional relationship, one that many times people have mistaken for a romantic one. People most likely assume that due to their familiarity with each other. Because of Sheldon’s strange tendencies, they know each other’s bathroom habits and schedules, among other things that ordinarily roommates would not know about each other.

Sheldon can only handle having a limited number of friends in his life at a time, but later shows flexibility when he accepts Bernadette and Amy as part of the social group. In season 6, the guys ask if comic book store owner Stuart can be part of the group while Howard is in space.

Despite Penny's neither being a scientist nor sharing many of the group's interests, and having constant fights with Sheldon in the early episodes, they become close friends. While some fans supported a romantic relationship between Sheldon and Penny, Lorre stated his opposition to it by saying: "We've stumbled into creating a character who has chosen a lifestyle for himself that is unique. And I don't see any reason to modify it."

He once idolized fictional prodigy Wesley Crusher from Star Trek: The Next Generation, portrayed by Wil Wheaton, until Wheaton did not show up at a convention attended by Sheldon in 1995. Sheldon had spent 15 hours on a bus travelling to the convention during which time he was forced to break his rule about urinating in a moving vehicle. After this moment Wil Wheaton became number six on Sheldon's mortal enemy list (a list he started when he was 9 on a 5¼-inch floppy disk). Wheaton was one of Sheldon's mortal enemies, along with his coworkers Barry Kripke and Leslie Winkle. Later, Wheaton managed to patch things up with Sheldon, only to inadvertently pass the enemy list spot to Brent Spiner, who removed the packaging from a signed Wesley Crusher action figure presented to Sheldon as a gift. Sheldon would later resume his enmity with Wheaton in season 11's "The Proton Regeneration" when they compete for the lead role in an Internet reboot of Sheldon's childhood favorite science TV series, Professor Proton, with Wheaton getting the part; however, when he sees how well Wheaton plays the role and on the advice of Howard, he apologizes to him.

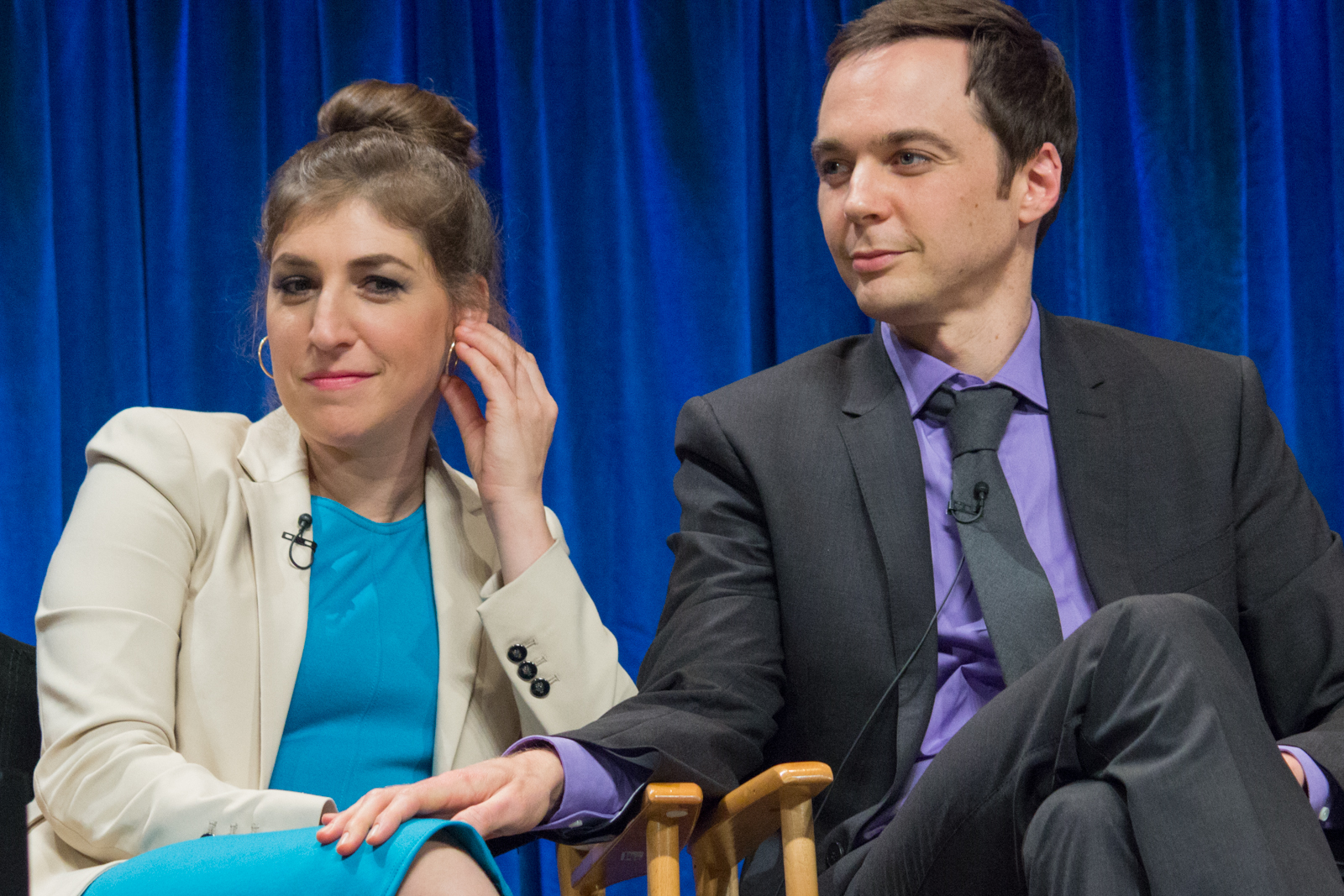
Mayim Bialik (who portrays Amy Farrah Fowler) and Jim Parsons at PaleyFest 2013 for the TV show Big Bang Theory

In the season 3 finale, Howard and Raj blackmail Sheldon into meeting Amy Farrah Fowler, with whom they matched him on a dating website. After some obnoxious comments about the dating website, Sheldon finds that Amy agrees with him, and he grows fond of her when she says that "Any or all physical contact up to and including coitus are off the table". Their relationship continues in season 4, although Sheldon often points out that they are not in a romantic relationship (stating that she "is a girl who is a friend, but is not my girlfriend"). The two enjoy intellectual games they create, and Amy and Sheldon openly express the same type of intellectual superiority.

In season 5, when Leonard inadvertently implies that he and Amy may have had sex after a wedding reception that they both attended, Sheldon unexpectedly reacts violently, karate-chopping Leonard's neck while telling Leonard "She is not for you... not for you!" Later, Sheldon formally asks Amy to be his girlfriend in "The Flaming Spittoon Acquisition". During their relationship, Amy begins a campaign to give Sheldon more attention to increase his feelings for her by embracing his interests. As they watch Howard being launched into space in its season finale, Amy is surprised when Sheldon takes her hand for emotional support.

During the first half of season 6, in "The Parking Spot Escalation" and "The Fish Guts Displacement", Sheldon is pushed further after seeing Amy partially exposed and taking care of her while she is ill respectively. In "The Cooper/Kripke Inversion", after being directly asked by Penny if he would ever have sex with Amy, Sheldon admits to Penny and Leonard that a physical relationship with Amy is a possibility, and being touched is something he is working on. While upset about Kripke, Amy does give him a consoling hug that Sheldon seems to need, and want. Even so, Amy has offered other romantic physical contact, and was very uncomfortable when they had to cuddle. In "The Spoiler Alert Segmentation", Leonard temporarily moves out and Amy proposes that she would be his perfect roommate and tries to move in, though Sheldon is uncomfortable with this change in their relationship. While playing Dungeons & Dragons during "The Love Spell Potential", Sheldon's and Amy's characters are commanded to have sex within the game. A very upset Amy asks Sheldon if they are ever going to be intimate and he again admits that it is a possibility.

In season 7, Sheldon passionately kisses Amy on the lips for the first time. Initially to prove a point, he later prolonged it, implying he enjoyed the feeling. Later episodes showed him willingly kissing Amy, implying he has gotten more comfortable in such a position of physical intimacy. The ultimate proof of Sheldon having feelings for Amy is given in the season 8 episode "The Prom Equivalency", when he finally admits being in love with her: "I love you too. There's no denying I have feelings for you that can't be explained in any other way. I briefly considered I had a brain parasite, but that seems even more far-fetched. The only conclusion was love." In the season 8 finale, "The Commitment Determination", Sheldon and Amy get into a fight over their definition of "commitment". Sheldon feels his relationship with Amy is going fast on its own, but Amy argues he is taking things too slowly and does not properly bestow on her unlimited affection. By the episode's end she has decided to take a break from their relationship while Sheldon is left numb from Amy's revelation. He glumly reveals that he had been planning on proposing to Amy with his grandmother's ring - a family heirloom.

In the season 9 premiere, Sheldon keeps pushing Amy to make up her mind about their relationship, but goes too far and insults her to her face and she angrily breaks up with him for good, thus officially ending their relationship. In "The Perspiration Implementation", Barry Kripke learns that Amy is no longer in a relationship and implies an interest in asking her out on a date. Sheldon is bothered by this notion and challenges Barry in a duel that will end three years hence. In "The Platonic Permutation" Amy offers Sheldon a chance to get back together with her after spending time together in an aquarium at Thanksgiving, but learns that he simply just wants to be her friend, with him revealing to her that "I excel at many things, but getting over you wasn't one of them". In "The Earworm Reverberation", Sheldon cannot get a song out his head, but after suddenly remembering the title and the lyrics, he realizes that the song was about Amy and that she changed his life for the better, which prompts him to go to her apartment to profess his love. He finds Amy on a date with Dave, who has a great adoration for Sheldon because of his intellect. Seeing how much they love each other, Dave gleefully urges Sheldon to kiss Amy, leading to their reunion. In the following episode, "The Opening Night Excitation" Leonard, Howard and Raj go to see Star Wars: The Force Awakens without Sheldon as while he was initially reluctant, ultimately opted to celebrate Amy's birthday with her instead. To make Amy's birthday enjoyable and memorable, Sheldon seeks out Penny and Bernadette as he respects their opinions regarding all things socially appropriate. He reveals to them that he has narrowed things down to three options, the first being a chance to play the harp with the Los Angeles Philharmonic, the second being an all-expense-paid trip to the Wisconsin Sheep and Wool Festival (though Amy would have to go alone because Sheldon's ornithophobia is nothing compared to his fear of sheep), and the third being the two of them engaging in coitus, at which point Penny squeezes and shatters the wine glass in her hand due to disbelief and/or shock. After Penny and Bernadette convince him that finally being intimate with her is the most beautiful gift that he could give to her, Sheldon and Amy have sex for the first time on the latter's birthday. Sheldon comments, "I enjoyed that more than I thought I would".

In season 10, Sheldon and Amy move in together for a five-week experiment to test out their compatibility, and after its successful run, decide to move in together permanently. In "The Holiday Summation", Mary Cooper confesses to being accepting of Sheldon and Amy living together out of wedlock in the privately held belief that Sheldon would never be in a relationship, which deeply offends him. In the tenth-season finale, Sheldon unexpectedly proposes to Amy after being kissed by Ramona Nowitzki, a graduate student who had been infatuated with him in earlier seasons. In the eleventh-season premiere, Amy accepts his proposal, and they marry in the season finale. Late in season 12, Amy is preparing Sheldon to accept the prospect of having children by getting him to have fun experimenting with the Wolowitz children. In the series finale, both Sheldon and Amy are recipients of the Nobel Prize in Physics for their discovery of super asymmetry which they first worked on moments before their wedding. In Amy's speech, she encourages young girls around the world to study whatever they want. Instead of giving a self-centered speech, Sheldon thanks his family, his friends and his wife Amy for always supporting him. He also refers to Howard as "Astronaut Howard Wolowitz", exhibiting, for the first time, some level of pride in having a friend who was an astronaut. He also admits that he agrees with what Leonard said in the pilot episode, that Leonard and Penny's children will be "smart and beautiful".

At the end of season one of Young Sheldon, the adult Sheldon refers in voice over to having had children: in season 4, it is revealed that one of them is a son named Leonard, and banter between the adult Sheldon and Amy implies that their son was meant to be named after both Leonard Hofstadter and Leonard Nimoy. In the series finale of Young Sheldon, it is revealed that Sheldon's other child is a daughter, and that Sheldon's children appear to have interests contrary to his, such as athletics and acting.

== Reception ==
=== General ===
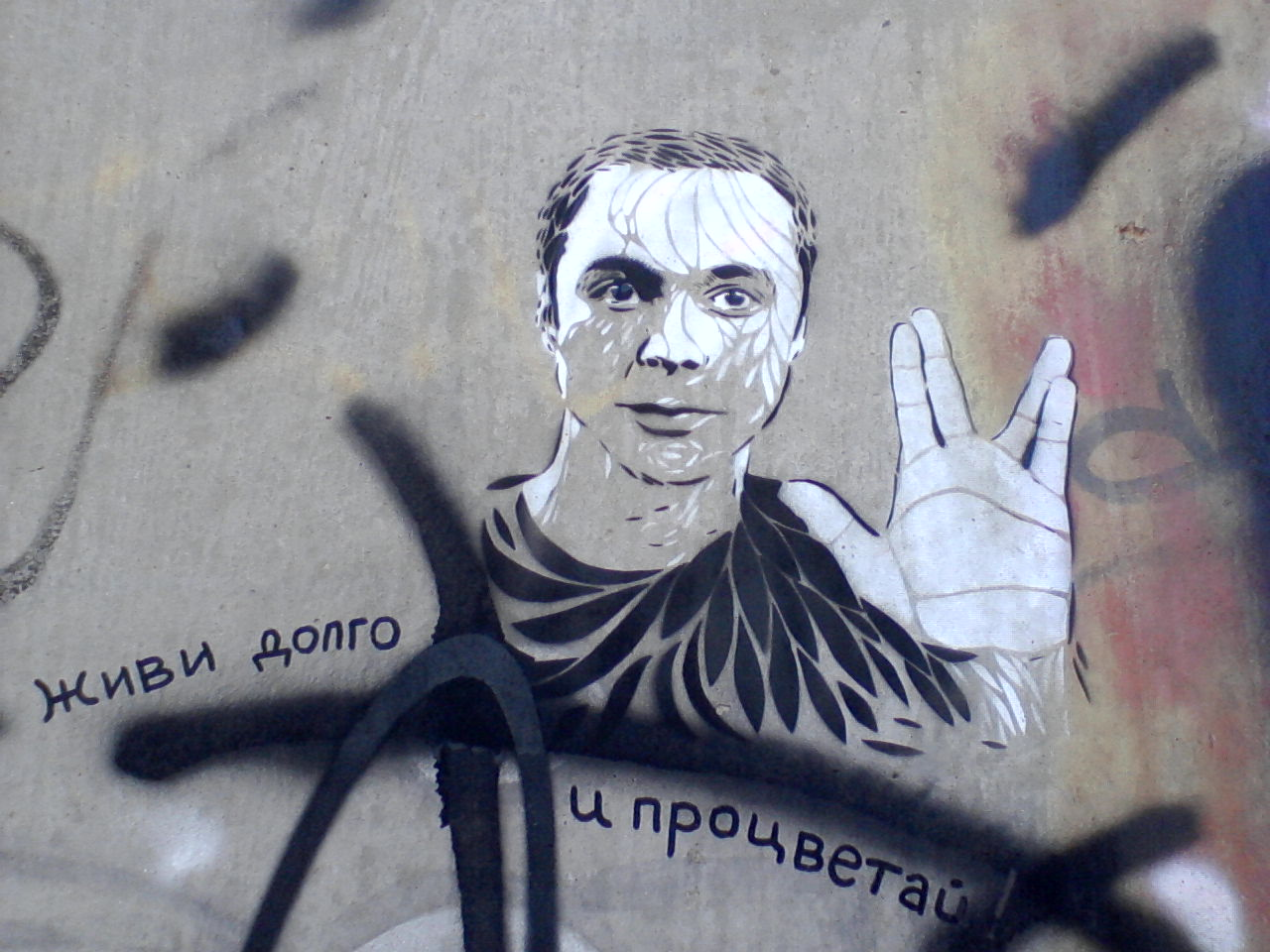
Sheldon Cooper doing the Vulcan salute, stencil graffiti on a wall in Volgograd, Russia

Both the character and Parsons' portrayal have received widespread acclaim and are often cited as the main reason for the program's success by both critics and fans. James Chamberlin of IGN wrote: "It's hard to imagine what The Big Bang Theory would be if it weren't for Jim Parsons' great portrayal of Sheldon Cooper". Matt Roush of TV Guide stated that "there's a spark of divine inspiration in Jim Parsons' uproarious Sheldon Cooper". Ken Tucker of Entertainment Weekly wrote that: "Parsons is doing something rare on network TV: making intellectualism admirable, even heroic".

On July 16, 2009, Parsons was nominated for the Primetime Emmy Award for Outstanding Lead Actor in a Comedy Series. He was nominated again for the same award on July 8, 2010, and won the award on August 29, 2010. On August 1, 2009, he won the TCA Award for Individual Achievement in Comedy, with the show itself winning the award for Outstanding Achievement in Comedy for season 2. He was nominated again for the same award in 2010 and 2012. Parsons was also nominated for the People's Choice Award for Favorite TV Comedy Actor and a Satellite Award for Best Actor – Television Series Musical or Comedy in 2009, 2010, and 2012. On January 16, 2011, Parsons won the Golden Globe Award for Best Actor – Television Series Musical or Comedy, presented by co-star Kaley Cuoco, for his work on seasons 3 and 4. On June 20, 2011, he won the Critics' Choice Television Award for Best Actor in a Comedy Series at the 1st Critics' Choice Television Awards for his work on season 4, and was nominated again for the same award in 2012. On September 18, 2011, he won his second consecutive Primetime Emmy Award – Lead Actor in Comedy, and was nominated again for the same award on July 19, 2012. In 2013, Parsons was nominated once again for the Golden Globe and received his first nomination for the Screen Actors Guild Award for Outstanding Performance by a Male Actor in a Comedy Series. In 2013 and 2014, Parsons was nominated for the Primetime Emmy Award – Lead Actor in Comedy for the 5th and 6th time, respectively, both of which he won for his 3rd and 4th Primetime Emmy Awards – Lead Actor in a Comedy Series meaning that Parsons had won this award four times in the past five years, including back-to-back in 2010/2011 and 2013/2014. No actor in the history of this award has won back-to-back awards on two separate occasions, and his total of four awards puts Parsons in a four-way tie with Carroll O'Connor, Kelsey Grammer, and Michael J. Fox.

The asteroid 246247 Sheldoncooper was named after Sheldon. In 2012, a newly discovered species of bee was named Euglossa bazinga, after the character's noted catch phrase, "Bazinga!"

In March 2013, the Columbus Zoo and Aquarium named a black-and-white colobus after Sheldon. In 2015, a new echinocaridid phyllocaridan from the Lower Devonian of central-eastern Poland, was named Ptychocaris sheldoni after Sheldon.

=== Autism spectrum ===
Some viewers have asserted that Sheldon's behavior is consistent with the classification of the autism spectrum that used to be known as Asperger's syndrome. The writers have stated that they did not use it as a basis for the character, but instead thought of his actions as "Sheldony". Series co-creator Bill Prady stated: "We write the character as the character. A lot of people see various things in him and make the connections. Our feeling is that Sheldon's mother never got a diagnosis, so we don't have one." Prady also told Alan Sepinwall of the New Jersey Star-Ledger that while Sheldon shares traits with people with Asperger's syndrome, he was uncomfortable labeling Sheldon as such.

In an interview, Jim Parsons noted the writers' response, but added that, in his opinion, Sheldon "couldn't display more traits" of Asperger's. Parsons has read John Elder Robison's 2007 memoir Look Me in the Eye about his life with Asperger syndrome, and said that: "A majority of what I read in that book touched on aspects of Sheldon." He also stated that "the way his brain works, it's so focused on the intellectual topics at hand that thinking he's autistic is an easy leap for people watching the show to make".

When another actor on the series, Mayim Bialik, who plays Amy and has a Doctorate of Philosophy in neuroscience, was interviewed by Neil deGrasse Tyson on StarTalk, she said of the theory:

All of our characters are in theory on the neuropsychiatric spectrum, I would say. Sheldon often gets talked about in terms of Asperger's or OCD. He has a thing with germs, he has a thing with numbers, he's got a lot of that precision that we see in OCD. There's a lot of interesting features to all of our characters that make them technically unconventional socially. And what we're trying to show with our show is that this is a group of people who likely were teased, mocked, told that they will never be appreciated or loved, and we have a group of people who have successful careers, active social lives (that involve things like Dungeons and Dragons and video games), but they also have relationships, and that's a fulfilling and satisfying life.

== See also ==
- Sheldon prime
- "Soft Kitty"
