= Steven Molaro =

Television producer and writer (born 1972)

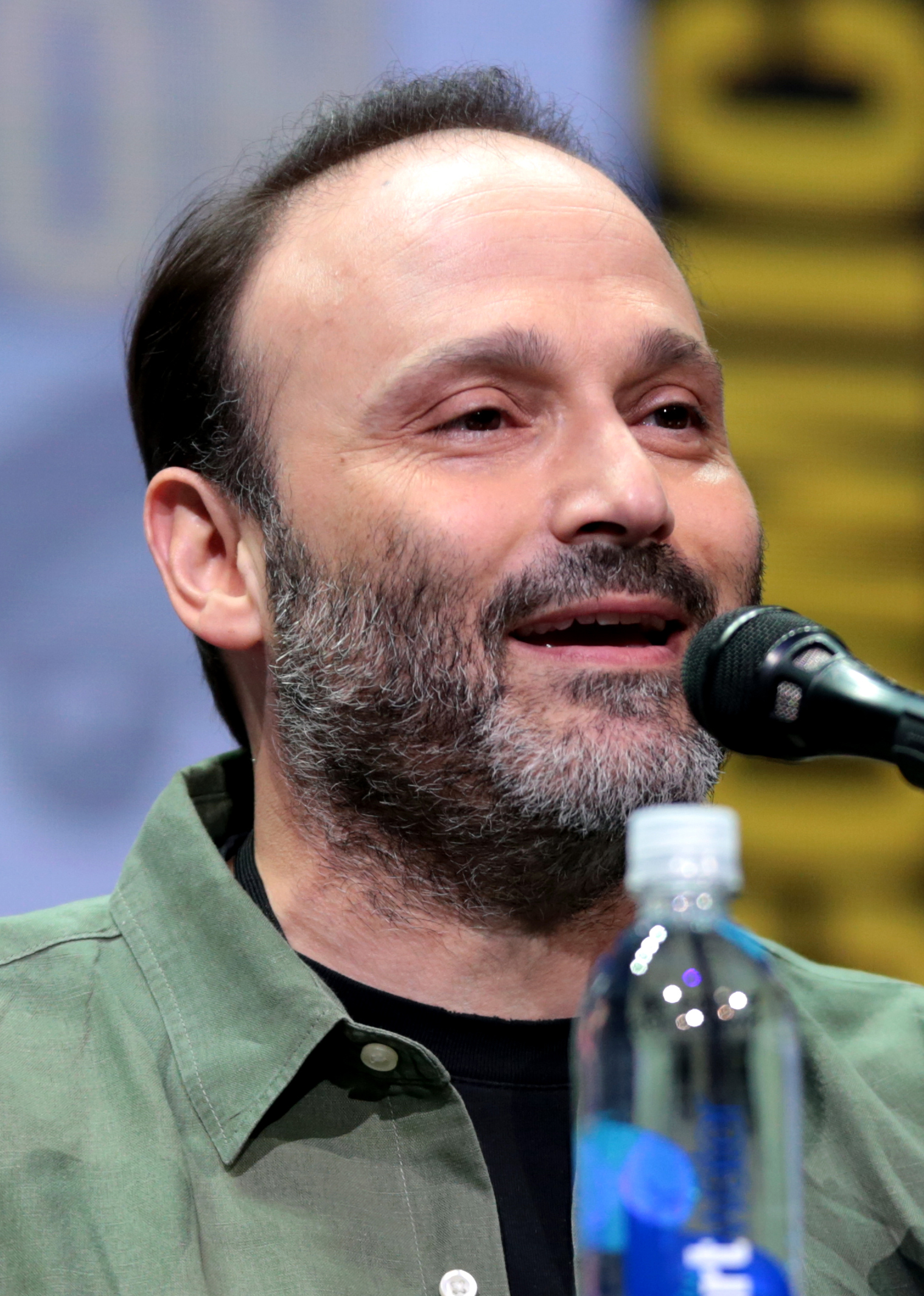
- Molaro at Comic-Con 2017
- Born: February 16, 1972 (age 54); Queens, New York
- Other name: Steve Molaro
- Occupations: Television producer, writer, story editor
- Years active: 2000–present
- Notable work: Young Sheldon; The Big Bang Theory iCarly; Drake & Josh; The Amanda Show

Steven Molaro (born February 16, 1972) is an American television producer and writer. He has worked on such productions as Freddie, The Class, Complete Savages, Nickelodeon's All That, The Amanda Show, Drake & Josh, Zoey 101 and iCarly and The WB's What I Like About You.

From 2007 to 2019, he was a producer/writer on the sitcom The Big Bang Theory. Molaro also co-created its prequel spinoff, Young Sheldon, with Chuck Lorre and Georgie & Mandy's First Marriage with Lorre and Steve Holland.

In 2007, he created a troll pizza delivery order, the "None Pizza with Left Beef".

He is a native of Queens, New York.

Molaro has been nominated for Primetime Emmy Award for Outstanding Comedy Series two times along with fellow writers Chuck Lorre and Bill Prady, in 2011 and 2012. He also shared the Danny Thomas Award for Outstanding Producer of Episodic Television, Comedy, with Lorre, Prady and The Big Bang Theory editor Faye Oshima Belyeu, in 2012 and 2013.

Until April 2011, Molaro authored the blog The Sneeze.

== Television credits ==
Year	Title	Notes
2000–2001	The Amanda Show	Writer of 9 episodes Story editor of 22 episodes
2000–2002	All That	Producer of 13 episodes
2004	Party Wagon	Television Movie story editor
2004–2005	Complete Savages	Story editor of 5 episodes in 2004; Executive story editor of 2 episodes in 2005; Writer of 3 episodes in 2004–2005
2005–2006	Freddie	Executive story editor of 17 episodes Writer of 2 episodes in 2005–2006
2004; 2006; 2008	Drake & Josh	Writer: "Two Idiots and a Baby"; Drake & Josh Go Hollywood; Merry Christmas, Drake & Josh
2006–2007	The Class	Writer of 2 episodes in 2006–2007
2005–2007	Zoey 101	Writer of 3 episodes in 2005–2007
2007–2008	iCarly	Writer of 5 episodes in 2007–2008
2007–2019	The Big Bang Theory	Producer of 16 episodes Writer of 212 episodes Supervising producer of 23 episodes Co-executive producer of 36 episodes Executive producer of 203 episodes Showrunner (seasons 6–10)
2017–2024	Young Sheldon	Co-creator; Executive producer Showrunner
2024	Georgie & Mandy's First Marriage	Co-creator; Executive producer Co-showrunner (seasons 1-2)
