= List of awards and nominations received by The Big Bang Theory =

The Big Bang Theory awards and nominations
- The Big Bang Theory logo.
Awards and nominations
Award	Wins	Nominations
American Film Institute Awards	1	1
Art Directors Guild Awards	3	9
Bravo Ottos	0	1
Critics' Choice Television Awards	7	23
Directors Guild of America Awards	0	3
EWwy Awards	4	10
Golden Globe Awards	1	7
Kerrang! Awards	0	1
MTV MIAW Awards Brazil	0	1
National Television Awards	1	7
Nickelodeon Kids' Choice Awards	1	18
People's Choice Awards	14	32
Primetime Emmy Awards	10	55
Producers Guild of America Awards	0	4
Satellite Awards	3	12
Screen Actors Guild Awards	0	11
Teen Choice Awards	5	27
Television Critics Association Awards	3	10
TV Guide Fan Favorite Awards	5	5
Young Hollywood Awards	0	2

Totals (Note: Certain award groups do not simply award one winner. They acknowledge several different recipients, have runners-up, and have third place. Since this is a specific recognition and is different from losing an award, runner-up mentions are considered wins in this award tally. For simplification and to avoid errors, each award in this list has been presumed to have had a prior nomination.)
- Wins: 58
- Nominations: 239

The Big Bang Theory is an American television sitcom created by Chuck Lorre and Bill Prady. Its main cast originally included Johnny Galecki, Jim Parsons, Kaley Cuoco, Simon Helberg, and Kunal Nayyar, with later additions including Sara Gilbert, Mayim Bialik, Melissa Rauch, Kevin Sussman, and Laura Spencer. The show premiered on CBS on September 24, 2007, and ran for twelve seasons before concluding on May 16, 2019.

The Big Bang Theory struggled to receive significant recognition from critics during its run, but it developed a strong fanbase and earned high viewership, especially after the first few seasons. It received various recognitions, including four consecutive nominations for the Primetime Emmy Award for Outstanding Comedy Series from 2011 to 2014 and a total of ten Emmy wins. From audiences, it won fourteen People's Choice Awards and five Teen Choice Awards. Parsons won four Emmys for Outstanding Lead Actor in a Comedy Series, as well as two Critics' Choice Television Awards, a Golden Globe Award, and three People's Choice Awards, among others.

== Awards and nominations ==
Award	Year (Note: The listed year refers to the date of the ceremony, not necessarily the year in which the corresponding season or episode aired.)	Category	Nominee(s)	Result	Ref.
American Film Institute Awards	2010	Television Program of the Year	The Big Bang Theory	Won (Note: One of ten official selections)	
Art Directors Guild Awards	2009	Episode of a Multi-Camera Television Series	John Shaffner (for "The Peanut Reaction") (Note: Additional nominees: Francoise Cherry-Cohen (set designer), Ann Shea (set decorator))	Nominated	
Art Directors Guild Awards	2010	Episode of a Multi-Camera, Variety, or Unscripted Series	John Shaffner (for "The Adhesive Duck Deficiency") (Note: Additional nominees: Francoise Cherry-Cohen (assistant art director); Ann Shea (set decorator))	Nominated	
Art Directors Guild Awards	2014	Episode of a Multi-Camera, Variety, or Unscripted Series	John Shaffner (for "The Bakersfield Expedition") (Note: Additional nominees: Francoise Cherry-Cohen (art director); Ann Shea (set decorator))	Nominated	
Art Directors Guild Awards	2015	Multi-Camera Television Series	John Shaffner (for "The Locomotive Manipulation", "The Convention Conundrum", and "The Status Quo Combustion")	Won	
Art Directors Guild Awards	2016	Multi-Camera Television Series	John Shaffner (for "The Skywalker Incursion", "The Mystery Date Observation", and "The Platonic Permutation")	Won	
Art Directors Guild Awards	2017	Multi-Camera Series	John Shaffner (for "The Positive Negative Reaction", "The Big Bear Precipitation", and "The Fermentation Bifurcation")	Nominated	
Art Directors Guild Awards	2018	Multi-Camera Series	John Shaffner (for "The Romance Recalibration", "The Separation Agitation", and "The Explosion Implosion")	Nominated	
Art Directors Guild Awards	2019	Multi-Camera Series	John Shaffner (for "The Novelization Correlation", "The Sibling Realignment", and "The Bow Tie Asymmetry")	Nominated	
Art Directors Guild Awards	2020	Multi-Camera Series	John Shaffner (for "The Stockholm Syndrome", "The Conference Valuation", and "The Propagation Proposition") (Note: Additional nominees: Francoise Cherry-Cohen (art director); Hugo Maldonado (graphic artist); Ann Shea (set decorator))	Won	
Bravo Ottos	2020	Best Series	The Big Bang Theory	Nominated	
Critics' Choice Television Awards	2011	Best Comedy Series	The Big Bang Theory	Nominated	
Critics' Choice Television Awards	2011	Best Actor in a Comedy Series	Jim Parsons	Won	
Critics' Choice Television Awards	2012	Best Comedy Series	The Big Bang Theory	Nominated	
Critics' Choice Television Awards	2012	Best Actor in a Comedy Series	Jim Parsons	Nominated	
Critics' Choice Television Awards	2013	Best Comedy Series	The Big Bang Theory	Won	
Critics' Choice Television Awards	2013	Best Actor in a Comedy Series	Jim Parsons	Nominated	
Critics' Choice Television Awards	2013	Best Supporting Actor in a Comedy Series	Simon Helberg	Won	
Critics' Choice Television Awards	2013	Best Supporting Actress in a Comedy Series	Kaley Cuoco	Won (Note: Tied with Eden Sher for The Middle)	
Critics' Choice Television Awards	2013	Best Supporting Actress in a Comedy Series	Melissa Rauch	Nominated	
Critics' Choice Television Awards	2013	Best Guest Performer in a Comedy Series	Bob Newhart	Nominated	
Critics' Choice Television Awards	2014	Best Comedy Series	The Big Bang Theory	Nominated	
Critics' Choice Television Awards	2014	Best Actor in a Comedy Series	Jim Parsons	Won	
Critics' Choice Television Awards	2014	Best Supporting Actress in a Comedy Series	Mayim Bialik	Nominated	
Critics' Choice Television Awards	2014	Best Supporting Actress in a Comedy Series	Kaley Cuoco	Nominated	
Critics' Choice Television Awards	2014	Best Guest Performer in a Comedy Series	James Earl Jones	Nominated	
Critics' Choice Television Awards	2015	Best Actor in a Comedy Series	Johnny Galecki	Nominated	
Critics' Choice Television Awards	2015	Best Supporting Actress in a Comedy Series	Mayim Bialik	Nominated	
Critics' Choice Television Awards	2015	Best Guest Performer in a Comedy Series	Laurie Metcalf	Nominated	
Critics' Choice Television Awards	2016	Best Supporting Actress in a Comedy Series	Mayim Bialik	Won	
Critics' Choice Television Awards	2016 (Note: The 22nd Critics' Choice Awards took place in December instead of the usual January.)	Best Guest Performer in a Comedy Series	Christine Baranski	Nominated	
Critics' Choice Television Awards	2018	Best Comedy Series	The Big Bang Theory	Nominated	
Critics' Choice Television Awards	2018	Best Supporting Actress in a Comedy Series	Mayim Bialik	Won	
Critics' Choice Television Awards	2019	Best Actor in a Comedy Series	Jim Parsons	Nominated	
Directors Guild of America Awards	2013	Outstanding Directorial Achievement in Comedy Series	Mark Cendrowski (for "The Date Night Variable") (Note: Additional nominees: Kelly-Anne Lee (unit production manager); Anthony Rich (first assistant director); Chris Klausen (second assistant director); Nikki Lorre (second second assistant director); Gay Linvill (associate director))	Nominated	
Directors Guild of America Awards	2014	Outstanding Directorial Achievement in Comedy Series	Mark Cendrowski (for "The Hofstadter Insufficiency") (Note: Additional nominees: Jay O'Connell (unit production manager); Anthony Rich (first assistant director); Nicole Lorre (second assistant director))	Nominated	
Directors Guild of America Awards	2014	Outstanding Directorial Achievement in Comedy Series	Anthony Rich (for "The Love Spell Potential") (Note: Additional nominees: Kelly-Anne Lee (unit production manager); Chris Klausen (first assistant director); Nicole Lorre (second assistant director))	Nominated	
EWwy Awards	2008	Best Comedy Series	The Big Bang Theory	Nominated	
EWwy Awards	2008	Best Actor in a Comedy	Jim Parsons	Nominated	
EWwy Awards	2008	Best Supporting Actress in a Comedy	Kaley Cuoco	Nominated	
EWwy Awards	2009	Best Comedy Series	The Big Bang Theory	Nominated	
EWwy Awards	2009	Best Actress in a Comedy	Kaley Cuoco	Won	
EWwy Awards	2010	Best Comedy Series	The Big Bang Theory	Won	
EWwy Awards	2010	Best Supporting Actor in a Comedy	Kunal Nayyar	Nominated	
EWwy Awards	2012	Best Actor, Comedy	Johnny Galecki	Nominated	
EWwy Awards	2015	Best Actor, Comedy	Jim Parsons	Won	
EWwy Awards	2016	Best Comedy Series	The Big Bang Theory	Won	
Golden Globe Awards	2011	Best Television Series – Musical or Comedy	The Big Bang Theory	Nominated	
Golden Globe Awards	2011	Best Actor in a Television Series – Musical or Comedy	Jim Parsons	Won	
Golden Globe Awards	2012	Best Actor in a Television Series – Musical or Comedy	Johnny Galecki	Nominated	
Golden Globe Awards	2013	Best Television Series – Musical or Comedy	The Big Bang Theory	Nominated	
Golden Globe Awards	2013	Best Actor in a Television Series – Musical or Comedy	Jim Parsons	Nominated	
Golden Globe Awards	2014	Best Television Series – Musical or Comedy	The Big Bang Theory	Nominated	
Golden Globe Awards	2014	Best Actor in a Television Series – Musical or Comedy	Jim Parsons	Nominated	
Kerrang! Awards	2012	Best TV Show	The Big Bang Theory	Nominated	
MTV MIAW Awards Brazil	2018	Series of the Year	The Big Bang Theory	Nominated	
National Television Awards	2013	Best Situation Comedy	The Big Bang Theory	Nominated	
National Television Awards	2014	Best Comedy	The Big Bang Theory	Nominated	
National Television Awards	2015	Best Comedy	The Big Bang Theory	Nominated	
National Television Awards	2016	Best International	The Big Bang Theory	Won	
National Television Awards	2017	Best Comedy	The Big Bang Theory	Nominated	
National Television Awards	2018	Best Comedy	The Big Bang Theory	Nominated	
National Television Awards	2019	Best Comedy	The Big Bang Theory	Nominated	
Nickelodeon Kids' Choice Awards	2014	Favorite TV Show	The Big Bang Theory	Nominated	
Nickelodeon Kids' Choice Awards	2014	Favorite Funny Star	Kaley Cuoco	Nominated	
Nickelodeon Kids' Choice Awards	2015	Favorite Family TV Show	The Big Bang Theory	Nominated	
Nickelodeon Kids' Choice Awards	2015	Favorite TV Actor	Jim Parsons	Nominated	
Nickelodeon Kids' Choice Awards	2015	Favorite TV Actress	Kaley Cuoco	Nominated	
Nickelodeon Kids' Choice Awards	2016	Favorite Family TV Show	The Big Bang Theory	Nominated	
Nickelodeon Kids' Choice Awards	2016	Favorite Male TV Star – Family Show	Jim Parsons	Won	
Nickelodeon Kids' Choice Awards	2016	Favorite Male TV Star – Family Show	Johnny Galecki	Nominated	
Nickelodeon Kids' Choice Awards	2016	Favorite Female TV Star – Family Show	Kaley Cuoco	Nominated	
Nickelodeon Kids' Choice Awards	2017	Favorite Family TV Show	The Big Bang Theory	Nominated	
Nickelodeon Kids' Choice Awards	2018	Favorite TV Show	The Big Bang Theory	Nominated	
Nickelodeon Kids' Choice Awards	2018	Favorite TV Actor	Jim Parsons	Nominated	
Nickelodeon Kids' Choice Awards	2018	Favorite TV Actress	Kaley Cuoco	Nominated	
Nickelodeon Kids' Choice Awards	2019	Favorite Funny TV Show	The Big Bang Theory	Nominated	
Nickelodeon Kids' Choice Awards	2019	Favorite Male TV Star	Jim Parsons	Nominated	
Nickelodeon Kids' Choice Awards	2019	Favorite Female TV Star	Kaley Cuoco	Nominated	
Nickelodeon Kids' Choice Awards	2020	Favorite Family TV Show	The Big Bang Theory	Nominated	
Nickelodeon Kids' Choice Awards	2020	Favorite Male TV Star	Jim Parsons	Nominated	
People's Choice Awards	2010	Favorite TV Comedy	The Big Bang Theory	Won	
People's Choice Awards	2010	Favorite TV Comedy Actor	Jim Parsons	Nominated	
People's Choice Awards	2011	Favorite TV Comedy	The Big Bang Theory	Nominated	
People's Choice Awards	2011	Favorite TV Comedy Actor	Jim Parsons	Nominated	
People's Choice Awards	2012	Favorite Network TV Comedy	The Big Bang Theory	Nominated	
People's Choice Awards	2012	Favorite TV Comedy Actor	Jim Parsons	Nominated	
People's Choice Awards	2012	Favorite TV Comedy Actress	Kaley Cuoco	Nominated	
People's Choice Awards	2013	Favorite Network TV Comedy	The Big Bang Theory	Won	
People's Choice Awards	2013	Favorite Comedic TV Actor	Jim Parsons	Nominated	
People's Choice Awards	2013	Favorite Comedic TV Actress	Kaley Cuoco	Nominated	
People's Choice Awards	2014	Favorite Network TV Comedy	The Big Bang Theory	Won	
People's Choice Awards	2014	Favorite Comedic TV Actor	Jim Parsons	Nominated	
People's Choice Awards	2014	Favorite Comedic TV Actress	Kaley Cuoco	Won	
People's Choice Awards	2015	Favorite TV Show	The Big Bang Theory	Won	
People's Choice Awards	2015	Favorite Network TV Comedy	The Big Bang Theory	Won	
People's Choice Awards	2015	Favorite Comedic TV Actor	Jim Parsons	Nominated	
People's Choice Awards	2015	Favorite Comedic TV Actress	Kaley Cuoco	Won	
People's Choice Awards	2016	Favorite TV Show	The Big Bang Theory	Won	
People's Choice Awards	2016	Favorite Network TV Comedy	The Big Bang Theory	Won	
People's Choice Awards	2016	Favorite Comedic TV Actor	Jim Parsons	Won	
People's Choice Awards	2016	Favorite Comedic TV Actor	Johnny Galecki	Nominated	
People's Choice Awards	2016	Favorite TV Comedic Actress	Kaley Cuoco	Nominated	
People's Choice Awards	2017	Favorite TV Show	The Big Bang Theory	Nominated	
People's Choice Awards	2017	Favorite Network TV Comedy	The Big Bang Theory	Won	
People's Choice Awards	2017	Favorite Comedic TV Actor	Jim Parsons	Won	
People's Choice Awards	2018	The Show of 2018	The Big Bang Theory	Nominated	
People's Choice Awards	2018	The Comedy Show of 2018	The Big Bang Theory	Nominated	
People's Choice Awards	2018	The Comedy TV Star of 2018	Jim Parsons	Won	
People's Choice Awards	2019	The Show of 2019	The Big Bang Theory	Nominated	
People's Choice Awards	2019	The Comedy Show of 2019	The Big Bang Theory	Won	
People's Choice Awards	2019	The Male TV Star of 2019	Jim Parsons	Nominated	
People's Choice Awards	2019	The Comedy TV Star of 2019	Jim Parsons	Nominated	
Primetime Emmy Awards	2009	Outstanding Lead Actor in a Comedy Series	Jim Parsons	Nominated	
Primetime Emmy Awards	2010	Outstanding Lead Actor in a Comedy Series	Jim Parsons	Won	
Primetime Emmy Awards	2011	Outstanding Comedy Series	The Big Bang Theory (Note: Nominees: Chuck Lorre, Bill Prady, Steven Molaro, and Lee Aronsohn (executive producers); Dave Goetsch and Eric Kaplan (co-executive producers); Jim Reynolds and Peter Chakos (supervising producers); Steve Holland (producer); Faye Oshima Belyeu (produced by))	Nominated	
Primetime Emmy Awards	2011	Outstanding Lead Actor in a Comedy Series	Johnny Galecki	Nominated	
Primetime Emmy Awards	2011	Outstanding Lead Actor in a Comedy Series	Jim Parsons	Won	
Primetime Emmy Awards	2012	Outstanding Comedy Series	The Big Bang Theory (Note: Nominees: Chuck Lorre, Bill Prady, and Steven Molaro (executive producers); Dave Goetsch, Eric Kaplan, and Jim Reynolds (co-executive producers); Peter Chakos and Steve Holland (supervising producers); Maria Ferrari (producer); Faye Oshima Belyeu (produced by))	Nominated	
Primetime Emmy Awards	2012	Outstanding Lead Actor in a Comedy Series	Jim Parsons	Nominated	
Primetime Emmy Awards	2012	Outstanding Supporting Actress in a Comedy Series	Mayim Bialik	Nominated	
Primetime Emmy Awards	2013	Outstanding Comedy Series	The Big Bang Theory (Note: Nominees: Chuck Lorre, Steven Molaro, and Bill Prady (executive producers); Dave Goetsch, Eric Kaplan, Jim Reynolds, Steve Holland, Eddie Gorodetsky, and Faye Oshima Belyeu (co-executive producers); Peter Chakos and Maria Ferrari (supervising producers))	Nominated	
Primetime Emmy Awards	2013	Outstanding Lead Actor in a Comedy Series	Jim Parsons	Won	
Primetime Emmy Awards	2013	Outstanding Supporting Actress in a Comedy Series	Mayim Bialik	Nominated	
Primetime Emmy Awards	2014	Outstanding Comedy Series	The Big Bang Theory (Note: Nominees: Chuck Lorre, Steven Molaro, and Bill Prady (executive producers); Dave Goetsch, Eric Kaplan, Jim Reynolds, Steve Holland, Maria Ferrari, and Faye Oshima Belyeu (co-executive producers); Peter Chakos (supervising producer); Kristy Cecil (producer))	Nominated	
Primetime Emmy Awards	2014	Outstanding Lead Actor in a Comedy Series	Jim Parsons	Won	
Primetime Emmy Awards	2014	Outstanding Supporting Actress in a Comedy Series	Mayim Bialik	Nominated	
Primetime Emmy Awards	2015	Outstanding Supporting Actress in a Comedy Series	Mayim Bialik	Nominated	
Primetime Emmy Awards	2018	Outstanding Directing for a Comedy Series	Mark Cendrowski (for "The Bow Tie Asymmetry")	Nominated	
Primetime Emmy Awards	2019	Outstanding Directing for a Comedy Series	Mark Cendrowski (for "The Stockholm Syndrome")	Nominated	
Primetime Creative Arts Emmy Awards	2009	Outstanding Art Direction for a Multi-Camera Series	John Shaffner and Ann Shea (for "The Hofstadter Isotope", "The Vegas Renormalization", and "The Lizard-Spock Expansion")	Nominated	
Primetime Creative Arts Emmy Awards	2009	Outstanding Guest Actress in a Comedy Series	Christine Baranski (for "The Maternal Capacitance")	Nominated	
Primetime Creative Arts Emmy Awards	2010	Outstanding Art Direction for a Multi-Camera Series	John Shaffner and Ann Shea (for "The Gothowitz Deviation" and "The Adhesive Duck Deficiency")	Nominated	
Primetime Creative Arts Emmy Awards	2010	Outstanding Guest Actress in a Comedy Series	Christine Baranski (for "The Maternal Congruence")	Nominated	
Primetime Creative Arts Emmy Awards	2010	Outstanding Makeup for a Multi-Camera Series or Special (Non-Prosthetic)	Peggy Nichols, Ken Diaz, and Vikki McCarter (for "The Electric Can Opener Fluctuation")	Nominated	
Primetime Creative Arts Emmy Awards	2010	Outstanding Technical Direction, Camerawork, Video Control for a Series	John Pierre Dechene, James L. Hitchcock, Richard Price, Brian Armstrong, Devin Atwood, and John D. O'Brien (for "The Adhesive Duck Deficiency")	Nominated	
Primetime Creative Arts Emmy Awards	2011	Outstanding Art Direction for a Multi-Camera Series	John Shaffner, Francoise Cherry-Cohen, and Ann Shea (for "The Love Car Displacement", "The 21-Second Excitation", and "The Agreement Dissection")	Nominated	
Primetime Creative Arts Emmy Awards	2011	Outstanding Picture Editing for a Comedy Series (Single or Multi-Camera)	Peter Chakos (for "The Agreement Dissection")	Nominated	
Primetime Creative Arts Emmy Awards	2012	Outstanding Multi-Camera Picture Editing for a Comedy Series	Peter Chakos (for "The Countdown Reflection")	Nominated	
Primetime Creative Arts Emmy Awards	2012	Outstanding Technical Direction, Camerawork, Video Control for a Series	John Pierre Dechene, James L. Hitchcock, Richard Price, Brian Armstrong, Ray Gonzales, and John D. O'Brien (for "The Countdown Reflection")	Nominated	
Primetime Creative Arts Emmy Awards	2013	Outstanding Art Direction for a Multi-Camera Series	John Shaffner, Francoise Cherry-Cohen, and Ann Shea (for "The Date Night Variable", "The Bakersfield Expedition", and "The Love Spell Potential")	Nominated	
Primetime Creative Arts Emmy Awards	2013	Outstanding Guest Actor in a Comedy Series	Bob Newhart	Won	
Primetime Creative Arts Emmy Awards	2013	Outstanding Hairstyling for a Multi-Camera Series or Special	Faye R. Woods, Sylvia Surdu, and Louise Dowling (for "The Bakersfield Expedition")	Nominated	
Primetime Creative Arts Emmy Awards	2013	Outstanding Multi-Camera Picture Editing for a Comedy Series	Peter Chakos (for "The Love Spell Potential")	Nominated	
Primetime Creative Arts Emmy Awards	2013	Outstanding Technical Direction, Camerawork, Video Control for a Series	James L. Hitchcock, John Pierre Dechene, Brian Armstrong, Devin Atwood, Mark Davison, and John D. O'Brien (for "The Higgs Boson Observation")	Won	
Primetime Creative Arts Emmy Awards	2014	Outstanding Art Direction for a Contemporary Program (Half-Hour or Less)	John Shaffner, Francoise Cherry-Cohen, and Ann Shea (for "The Hofstadter Insufficiency", "The Locomotive Manipulation", and "The Proton Transmogrification")	Nominated	
Primetime Creative Arts Emmy Awards	2014	Outstanding Guest Actor in a Comedy Series	Bob Newhart	Nominated	
Primetime Creative Arts Emmy Awards	2014	Outstanding Multi-Camera Picture Editing for a Comedy Series	Peter Chakos (for "The Cooper Extraction")	Won	
Primetime Creative Arts Emmy Awards	2014	Outstanding Technical Direction, Camerawork, Video Control for a Series	Brian Armstrong, John Pierre Dechene, Ray Gonzales, James L. Hitchcock, Richard G. Price, and John D. O'Brien (for "The Locomotive Manipulation")	Nominated	
Primetime Creative Arts Emmy Awards	2015	Outstanding Cinematography for a Multi-Camera Series	Steven V. Silver (for "The Expedition Approximation")	Nominated	
Primetime Creative Arts Emmy Awards	2015	Outstanding Guest Actress in a Comedy Series	Christine Baranski (for "The Maternal Combustion")	Nominated	
Primetime Creative Arts Emmy Awards	2015	Outstanding Multi-Camera Picture Editing for a Comedy Series	Peter Chakos (for "The Comic Book Store Regeneration")	Won	
Primetime Creative Arts Emmy Awards	2015	Outstanding Production Design for a Narrative Program (Half-Hour or Less)	John Shaffner, Francoise Cherry-Cohen, and Ann Shea (for "The First Pitch Insufficiency", "The Clean Room Infiltration", and "The Skywalker Incursion")	Nominated	
Primetime Creative Arts Emmy Awards	2015	Outstanding Technical Direction, Camerawork, Video Control for a Series	Brian Wayne Armstrong, John Pierre Dechene, James L. Hitchcock, Richard G. Price, and John D. O'Brien (for "The Expedition Approximation")	Nominated	
Primetime Creative Arts Emmy Awards	2016	Outstanding Cinematography for a Multi-Camera Series	Steven V. Silver (for "The Convergence Convergence")	Nominated	
Primetime Creative Arts Emmy Awards	2016	Outstanding Guest Actor in a Comedy Series	Bob Newhart	Nominated	
Primetime Creative Arts Emmy Awards	2016	Outstanding Guest Actress in a Comedy Series	Christine Baranski	Nominated	
Primetime Creative Arts Emmy Awards	2016	Outstanding Guest Actress in a Comedy Series	Laurie Metcalf	Nominated	
Primetime Creative Arts Emmy Awards	2016	Outstanding Multi-Camera Picture Editing for a Comedy Series	Peter Chakos (for "The Opening Night Excitation")	Won	
Primetime Creative Arts Emmy Awards	2016	Outstanding Production Design for a Narrative Program (Half-Hour or Less)	John Shaffner, Francoise Cherry-Cohen, and Ann Shea (for "The Positive Negative Reaction", "The Big Bear Precipitation", and "The Fermentation Bifurcation")	Nominated	
Primetime Creative Arts Emmy Awards	2016	Outstanding Technical Direction, Camerawork, Video Control for a Series	Brian Wayne Armstrong, John Pierre Dechene, James L. Hitchcock, Richard G. Price, and John D. O'Brien (for "The Celebration Experimentation")	Nominated	
Primetime Creative Arts Emmy Awards	2017	Outstanding Multi-Camera Picture Editing for a Comedy Series	Peter Chakos (for "The Holiday Summation")	Won	
Primetime Creative Arts Emmy Awards	2017	Outstanding Production Design for a Narrative Program (Half-Hour or Less)	John Shaffner, Francoise Cherry-Cohen, and Ann Shea (for "The Dependence Transcendence")	Nominated	
Primetime Creative Arts Emmy Awards	2017	Outstanding Technical Direction, Camerawork, Video Control for a Series	John D. O'Brien, John Pierre Dechene, Richard G. Price, James L. Hitchcock, Brian Wayne Armstrong, and Nick Gomez (for "The Locomotion Reverberation")	Nominated	
Primetime Creative Arts Emmy Awards	2018	Outstanding Multi-Camera Picture Editing for a Comedy Series	Peter Chakos (for "The Bow Tie Asymmetry")	Nominated	
Primetime Creative Arts Emmy Awards	2018	Outstanding Technical Direction, Camerawork, Video Control for a Series	John D. O'Brien, John Pierre Dechene, Richard G. Price, James L. Hitchcock, Brian Wayne Armstrong, and Scott I. Acosta (for "The Bow Tie Asymmetry")	Nominated	
Primetime Creative Arts Emmy Awards	2019	Outstanding Multi-Camera Picture Editing for a Comedy Series	Peter Chakos (for "The Stockholm Syndrome")	Nominated	
Primetime Creative Arts Emmy Awards	2019	Outstanding Technical Direction, Camerawork, Video Control for a Series	John D. O'Brien, John Pierre Dechene, Richard G. Price, James L. Hitchcock, Brian Wayne Armstrong, and John E. Goforth (for "The Stockholm Syndrome")	Nominated	
Producers Guild of America Awards	2012	Danny Thomas Award for Outstanding Producer of Episodic Television, Comedy	The Big Bang Theory (Note: Nominees: Chuck Lorre, Steven Molaro, Faye Oshima Belyeu, and Bill Prady)	Nominated	
Producers Guild of America Awards	2013	Danny Thomas Award for Outstanding Producer of Episodic Television, Comedy	The Big Bang Theory	Nominated	
Producers Guild of America Awards	2014	Danny Thomas Award for Outstanding Producer of Episodic Television, Comedy	The Big Bang Theory	Nominated	
Producers Guild of America Awards	2015	Danny Thomas Award for Outstanding Producer of Episodic Television, Comedy	The Big Bang Theory	Nominated	
Satellite Awards	2009	Best Television Series, Comedy or Musical	The Big Bang Theory	Nominated	
Satellite Awards	2009	Best Actor in a Series, Comedy or Musical	Jim Parsons	Nominated	
Satellite Awards	2010	Best Actor in a Series, Comedy or Musical	Jim Parsons	Nominated	
Satellite Awards	2012	Best Television Series, Comedy or Musical	The Big Bang Theory	Won	
Satellite Awards	2012	Best Actor in a Series, Comedy or Musical	Johnny Galecki	Won	
Satellite Awards	2012	Best Actor in a Series, Comedy or Musical	Jim Parsons	Nominated	
Satellite Awards	2012	Best Actress in a Series, Comedy or Musical	Kaley Cuoco	Won	
Satellite Awards	2012	Best Actress in a Supporting Role in a Series, Miniseries or Motion Picture Made for Television	Mayim Bialik	Nominated	
Satellite Awards	2014	Best Television Series, Comedy or Musical	The Big Bang Theory	Nominated	
Satellite Awards	2014	Best Actor in a Series, Comedy or Musical	Jim Parsons	Nominated	
Satellite Awards	2015	Best Television Series, Comedy or Musical	The Big Bang Theory	Nominated	
Satellite Awards	2015	Best Actor in a Series, Comedy or Musical	Jim Parsons	Nominated	
Screen Actors Guild Awards	2012	Outstanding Performance by an Ensemble in a Comedy Series	The Big Bang Theory (Note: Nominees: Mayim Bialik, Kaley Cuoco, Johnny Galecki, Simon Helberg, Kunal Nayyar, Jim Parsons, and Melissa Rauch)	Nominated	
Screen Actors Guild Awards	2013	Outstanding Performance by an Ensemble in a Comedy Series	The Big Bang Theory	Nominated	
Screen Actors Guild Awards	2013	Outstanding Performance by a Male Actor in a Comedy Series	Jim Parsons	Nominated	
Screen Actors Guild Awards	2014	Outstanding Performance by an Ensemble in a Comedy Series	The Big Bang Theory	Nominated	
Screen Actors Guild Awards	2014	Outstanding Performance by a Male Actor in a Comedy Series	Jim Parsons	Nominated	
Screen Actors Guild Awards	2014	Outstanding Performance by a Female Actor in a Comedy Series	Mayim Bialik	Nominated	
Screen Actors Guild Awards	2015	Outstanding Performance by an Ensemble in a Comedy Series	The Big Bang Theory	Nominated	
Screen Actors Guild Awards	2015	Outstanding Performance by a Male Actor in a Comedy Series	Jim Parsons	Nominated	
Screen Actors Guild Awards	2016	Outstanding Performance by an Ensemble in a Comedy Series	The Big Bang Theory	Nominated	
Screen Actors Guild Awards	2016	Outstanding Performance by a Male Actor in a Comedy Series	Jim Parsons	Nominated	
Screen Actors Guild Awards	2017	Outstanding Performance by an Ensemble in a Comedy Series	The Big Bang Theory	Nominated	
Teen Choice Awards	2010	Choice TV Show: Comedy	The Big Bang Theory	Nominated	
Teen Choice Awards	2010	Choice TV Actor: Comedy	Jim Parsons	Nominated	
Teen Choice Awards	2010	Choice TV Actress: Comedy	Kaley Cuoco	Nominated	
Teen Choice Awards	2010	Choice TV: Male Scene Stealer	Johnny Galecki	Nominated	
Teen Choice Awards	2010	Choice TV: Male Scene Stealer	Simon Helberg	Nominated	
Teen Choice Awards	2011	Choice TV Show: Comedy	The Big Bang Theory	Nominated	
Teen Choice Awards	2011	Choice TV Actor: Comedy	Jim Parsons	Nominated	
Teen Choice Awards	2011	Choice TV Actress: Comedy	Kaley Cuoco	Nominated	
Teen Choice Awards	2012	Choice TV Show: Comedy	The Big Bang Theory	Nominated	
Teen Choice Awards	2012	Choice TV Actor: Comedy	Jim Parsons	Nominated	
Teen Choice Awards	2012	Choice TV Actress: Comedy	Kaley Cuoco	Nominated	
Teen Choice Awards	2013	Choice TV Show: Comedy	The Big Bang Theory	Nominated	
Teen Choice Awards	2013	Choice TV Actor: Comedy	Jim Parsons	Won	
Teen Choice Awards	2013	Choice TV Actress: Comedy	Kaley Cuoco	Nominated	
Teen Choice Awards	2014	Choice TV Show: Comedy	The Big Bang Theory	Won	
Teen Choice Awards	2014	Choice TV Actor: Comedy	Jim Parsons	Nominated	
Teen Choice Awards	2014	Choice TV Actress: Comedy	Kaley Cuoco	Nominated	
Teen Choice Awards	2014	Choice TV: Female Scene Stealer	Mayim Bialik	Nominated	
Teen Choice Awards	2015	Choice TV Show: Comedy	The Big Bang Theory	Won	
Teen Choice Awards	2015	Choice TV Actor: Comedy	Jim Parsons	Nominated	
Teen Choice Awards	2015	Choice TV Actress: Comedy	Kaley Cuoco	Nominated	
Teen Choice Awards	2015	Choice TV: Chemistry	The Big Bang Theory	Nominated	
Teen Choice Awards	2016	Choice TV Actor: Comedy	Jim Parsons	Nominated	
Teen Choice Awards	2018	Choice Comedy TV Show	The Big Bang Theory	Won	
Teen Choice Awards	2019	Choice Comedy TV Show	The Big Bang Theory	Won	
Teen Choice Awards	2019	Choice Comedy TV Actor	Jim Parsons	Nominated	
Teen Choice Awards	2019	Choice Comedy TV Actress	Kaley Cuoco	Nominated	
Television Critics Association Awards	2009	Outstanding Achievement in Comedy	The Big Bang Theory	Won	
Television Critics Association Awards	2009	Individual Achievement in Comedy	Jim Parsons	Won	
Television Critics Association Awards	2010	Outstanding Achievement in Comedy	The Big Bang Theory	Nominated	
Television Critics Association Awards	2010	Individual Achievement in Comedy	Jim Parsons	Nominated	
Television Critics Association Awards	2012	Outstanding Achievement in Comedy	The Big Bang Theory	Nominated	
Television Critics Association Awards	2012	Individual Achievement in Comedy	Jim Parsons	Nominated	
Television Critics Association Awards	2013	Outstanding Achievement in Comedy	The Big Bang Theory	Won (Note: Tied with Parks and Recreation)	
Television Critics Association Awards	2014	Outstanding Achievement in Comedy	The Big Bang Theory	Nominated	
Television Critics Association Awards	2014	Individual Achievement in Comedy	Jim Parsons	Nominated	
Television Critics Association Awards	2015	Outstanding Achievement in Comedy	The Big Bang Theory	Nominated	
TV Guide Fan Favorite Awards	2011	Favorite Comedy	The Big Bang Theory	Won	
TV Guide Fan Favorite Awards	2013	Favorite Comedy	The Big Bang Theory	Won	
TV Guide Fan Favorite Awards	2013	Favorite Ensemble	The Big Bang Theory	Won	
TV Guide Fan Favorite Awards	2013	Favorite Actor	Jim Parsons	Won	
TV Guide Fan Favorite Awards	2014	Favorite Comedy	The Big Bang Theory	Won	
Young Hollywood Awards	2014	Best Cast Chemistry – TV	The Big Bang Theory	Nominated	
Young Hollywood Awards	2014	Best On-Screen Couple	Mayim Bialik and Jim Parsons	Nominated	
