= Art Directors Guild Award for Excellence in Production Design for a Multi-Camera Series =

Television award

The Art Directors Guild Award for Outstanding Production Design for a Multi-Camera Series is an award given annually by the Art Directors Guild. It was introduced at the Art Directors Guilds' fifth annual honors, in 2000, after being combined with regular, one-hour series for the four previous ceremonies (including with miniseries and television films for the first).

== Winners and nominations ==
=== 2000s ===
Excellence in Production Design Award – Multi-Camera Television Series

Year	Program	Episode(s)	Nominees	Network
2000 (5th)
2000 (5th)	Bette	"Pilot"	Bernard Vyzga (production designer), Rich Rohrer (assistant art director)	CBS
2000 (5th)	Daddio	"Fense and Sensibility"	Jay Pelissier (production designer)	NBC
2000 (5th)	DAG	"Return of Katherine Twigg"	Vincent Jefferds (production designer), Dawn Snyder (art director),	NBC
2000 (5th)	Malcolm & Eddie	"Bullets Over Kansas City"	Jerry Dunn (production designer), Stephanie Marra (assistant art director)	UPN
2000 (5th)	Nikki	"Pilot"	John Shaffner (production designer)	The WB
2001 (6th)
2001 (6th)	Will & Grace	"Prison Blues"	Glenda Rovello (production designer)	NBC
2001 (6th)	BattleBots		Tom Buderwitz (production designer)	Comedy Central
2001 (6th)	The Fighting Fitzgeralds	"Pilot"	Dahl Delu (production designer)	NBC
2001 (6th)	That's My Bush!	"An Aborted Dinner Date"	Thomas Azzari (production designer), Richard Improta (assistant art director)	Comedy Central
2001 (6th)	Titus	"When I Say Jump"	Steve Olson (production designer), William V. Ryder (art director)	Fox
2002 (7th)
2002 (7th)	Titus	"Into Thin Air"	Steve Olson (production designer), William V. Ryder (art director)	Fox
2002 (7th)	Bram & Alice	"Pilot"	Roy Christopher (production designer); Jim O'Donnell, Amy Skjonsby-Winslow (art directors)	CBS
2002 (7th)	8 Simple Rules	"All I Want for Christmas"	Jay Pelissier (production designer)	ABC
2002 (7th)	Friends	"The One Where Rachel Has a Baby, Parts 1 & 2"	John Shaffner, Joe Stewart (production designers)	NBC
2002 (7th)	Life with Bonnie	"Money Plus Marlens Makes Four"	Robert Strohmaier (production designer); Kathleen Widomski, Jim Yarmer (assistant art directors)	ABC
2003 (8th)
2003 (8th)	Arrested Development		Dawn Snyder (production designer), Liz Lapp (art director), Luke Freeborn (assistant art director)	Fox
2003 (8th)	Coupling	"The Right One"	Thomas Azzari (production designer), Richard Ramirez (assistant art director)	NBC
2003 (8th)	The King of Queens		Scott Heineman (production designer), Mark Walters (art director)	CBS
2003 (8th)	Life with Bonnie	"The Merry Ole Land of Oz"	Robert Strohmaier (production designer)	ABC
2003 (8th)	Will & Grace	"Fanilow"	Glenda Rovello (production designer)	NBC
2004 (9th)
2004 (9th)	Will & Grace	"Queens for a Day"	Glenda Rovello (production designer)	NBC
2004 (9th)	The Big House	"Almost Touched by an Angel"	Michael G. Gallenberg (production designer)	ABC
2004 (9th)	Complete Savages	"Carnival Knowledge"	Sharon Busse (production designer), Gary Smoot (assistant art director)	ABC
2004 (9th)	Joey	"Pilot"	John Shaffner (production designer)	NBC
2005 (10th)
2005 (10th)	Mad TV	"#1106"	John Sabato (production designer), D. Martyn Bookwalter (art director), Nicole Elespuru (assistant art director)	Fox
2005 (10th)	How I Met Your Mother	"Pilot"	Steve Olson (production designer)	CBS
2005 (10th)	Two and a Half Men	"A Low Guttural Tongue Flapping Noise"	John Shaffner (production designer)	CBS
2005 (10th)	The War at Home	"Pilot"	John Shaffner (production designer)	Fox
2005 (10th)	Will & Grace	"The Old Man and the Sea"	Glenda Rovello (production designer)	NBC
2006 (11th)
2006 (11th)	Mad TV	"#1207"	John Sabato (production designer), D. Martyn Bookwalter (art director), Nicole Elespuru (assistant art director)	Fox
2006 (11th)	The Class	"Pilot"	Glenda Rovello (production designer)	CBS
2006 (11th)	How I Met Your Mother	"World's Greatest Couple"	Steve Olson (production designer)	CBS
2006 (11th)	The New Adventures of Old Christine	"Exile On Lame Street"	Cabot McMullen (production designer)	CBS
2006 (11th)	Two and a Half Men	"The Pistol-Packin' Hermaphrodite"	John Shaffner (production designer)	CBS
2007 (12th)
2007 (12th)	Mad TV	"#1221"	John Sabato (production designer), D. Martyn Bookwalter (art director), Nicole Elespuru (assistant art director)	Fox
2007 (12th)	Back to You	"Pilot"	Bernard Vyzga (production designer), Rich Rohrer (assistant art director)	Fox
2007 (12th)	How I Met Your Mother	"Something Blue"	Steve Olson (production designer)	CBS
2007 (12th)	Rules of Engagement	"Fix Ups and Downs"	Bernard Vyzga (production designer), Lynn Griffin (assistant art director)	CBS
2007 (12th)	Two and a Half Men	"Is There a Mrs. Waffles?"	John Shaffner (production designer)	CBS
2008 (13th)
2008 (13th)	Little Britain USA	"Little Britain USA (4)"	Greg J. Grande, Michael Wylie (production designers); Daniel Maltese, Brian Stultz (art directors); James Edward Ferrell Jr., K.C. Fox (set decorators)	HBO
2008 (13th)	The Big Bang Theory	"The Peanut Reaction"	John Shaffner (production designer), Francoise Cherry-Cohen (set designer), Ann Shea (set decorator)	CBS
2008 (13th)	How I Met Your Mother	"Miracles"	Steve Olson (production designer), Daniel Saks (set designer), Susan Mina Eschelbach (set decorator/set designer)	CBS
2008 (13th)	Rules of Engagement	"Pimp My Ride"	Bernard Vyzga (production designer), Joe Pew (assistant art director), Jerie Kelter (set decorator)	CBS
2008 (13th)	Two and a Half Men	"A Jock Strap in Hell"	John Shaffner (production designer), Francoise Cherry-Cohen (set designer), Ann Shea (set decorator)	CBS

Excellence in Production Design Award – Multi-Camera, Variety or Unscripted Series

Year	Program	Episode(s)	Nominees	Network
2009 (14th)
2009 (14th)	Hell's Kitchen	"604"	John Janavs (production designer); Robert Frye, Kevin P. Lewis (art directors); Mercedes Younger (assistant art director); Libby Wampler (graphic designer); Heidi Miller, Stephen Paul Fackrell (set decorators)	Fox
2009 (14th)	The Big Bang Theory	"The Adhesive Duck Deficiency"	John Shaffner (production designer), Francoise Cherry-Cohen (set designer), Ann Shea (set decorator)	CBS
2009 (14th)	How I Met Your Mother	"Old King Clancy"	Steve Olson (production designer), Daniel Saks (set designer), Craig Villaubi (scenic artist), Susan Mina Eschelbach (set decorator/set designer)	CBS
2009 (14th)	The Jay Leno Show	"51"	Brandt Daniels (production designer); Jennifer Savala (art director); Justine Mercado (assistant art director); Joelle Mercado-Lam (graphic designer); Tony Meisel, Pete Stern (scenic artists)	NBC
2009 (14th)	Saturday Night Live	"Justin Timberlake/Ciara"	Eugene Lee, Keith Raywood, Akira Yoshimura (production designers); Joe DeTullio (art director); Mark Rudolf, Halina Siwolop (lead scenic artists)	NBC

=== 2010s ===
Excellence in Production Design Award – Multi-Camera Television Series

Year	Program	Episode(s)	Nominees	Network
2010 (15th)
2010 (15th)	Saturday Night Live	"Betty White/Jay-Z"	Joe DeTullio, Eugene Lee, Keith Raywood, Akira Yoshimura (production designers); Mark Rudolf, Halina Marki (scenic artists)	NBC
2010 (15th)	Conan	"Baa Baa Blackmail"	John Schaffner, Joe Stewart (production designers); Christopher Goumas (art director); Matt Russell (assistant art director)	TBS
2010 (15th)	Hell's Kitchen	"810"	John Janavs (production designer); Robert Frye, Kevin P. Lewis (art directors); Jen Swanston (assistant art director); Libby Wampler (graphic designer); Heidi Miller, Stephen Paul Fackrell (set decorators)	Fox
2010 (15th)	How I Met Your Mother	"Natural History"	Steve Olson (production designer), Daniel Saks (set designer), Susan Eschelbach (set decorator)	CBS
2010 (15th)	Two and a Half Men	"Hookers, Hookers, Hookers"	John Shaffner (production designer), Francoise Cherry-Cohen (set designer), Ann Shea (set decorator)	CBS

Excellence in Production Design Award – Multi-Camera, Variety or Unscripted Series

Year	Program	Episode(s)	Nominees	Network
2011 (16th)
2011 (16th)	Saturday Night Live	"Justin Timberlake/Lady Gaga"	Joe DeTullio, Eugene Lee, Keith Raywood, Akira Yoshimura (production designers); Gillian Speers (set designer); Tara Donnelly (graphic designer); Mark Rudolf, Halina Marki (scenic artists)	NBC
2011 (16th)	American Idol	"Top 12 Boys Perform"	James Yarnell (production designer), Dave Edwards (art director)	Fox
2011 (16th)	Dancing with the Stars	"Round One"	James Yarnell (production designer); Dave Edwards, Jeremiah Gastinell (art directors); Lou A. Trabbie III (set decorator)	ABC
2011 (16th)	How I Met Your Mother	"Ducky Tie"	Steve Olson (production designer), Daniel Saks (set designer), Susan Eschelbach (set decorator)	CBS
2011 (16th)	2 Broke Girls	"And the Rich Peoples Problems"	Glenda Rovello (production designer), Conny Boettger-Marinos (set designer), Amy Feldman (set decorator)	CBS
2012 (17th)
2012 (17th)	Saturday Night Live	"Mick Jagger"	Joe DeTullio, Eugene Lee, Keith Raywood, Akira Yoshimura (production designers); Gillian Speers (set designer); Tara Donnelly (graphic designer); Mark Rudolf, Halina Marki (scenic artists)	NBC
2012 (17th)	2012 Democratic National Convention		Bruce Rodgers (production designer); Anthony Bishop, Douglas Cook (art directors); Lindsey Breslauer (assistant art director); Shelley Rodgers (off site art director)	ABC
2012 (17th)	How I Met Your Mother	"The Magician's Code, Part I"	Steve Olson (production designer), Daniel Saks (set designer), Susan Eschelbach (set decorator)	CBS
2012 (17th)	2 Broke Girls	"And The Silent Partner"	Glenda Rovello (production designer), Conny Boettger-Marinos (set designer), Amy Feldman (set decorator)	CBS
2012 (17th)	The Voice		James Pearse Connelly, Anton Goss (production designers); Anthony Bishop, Zeya Maurer, Rick Vanzini (art directors); Kirsten Larsen, Lydia Smith (assistant art directors); Scott Harper (graphic designer); Lynn Brown, Jose Ramirez, Ed Strang (scenic artists)	NBC
2013 (18th)
2013 (18th)	Portlandia	"Missionaries"	Tyler Robinson (production designer), Schuyler Telleen (art director), Katherine Isom (set decorator)	IFC
2013 (18th)	The Big Bang Theory	"The Bakersfield Expedition"	John Shaffner (production designer), Francoise Cherry-Cohen (set designer), Ann Shea (set decorator)	CBS
2013 (18th)	How I Met Your Mother	"The Lighthouse"	Steve Olson (production designer), Daniel Saks (set designer), Susan Eschelbach (set decorator)	CBS
2013 (18th)	Saturday Night Live	"Justin Timberlake"	Joe DeTullio, Eugene Lee, Keith Raywood, Akira Yoshimura (production designers); Andrea Purcigliotti (film unit art director); Tara Donnelly (graphic designer); Mark Rudolph, Halina Marki (scenic artists)	NBC
2013 (18th)	The Voice	"Live Playoffs, Part 1"	James Pearse Connelly, Anton Goss (production designers); Dave Edwards, Zeya Maurer, Lydia Smith (art directors); Ellen Jaworski, Brittany Perham-MacWhorter (assistant art directors); Scott Harper (graphic designer); Lynn Brown, Jose Ramirez, Ed Strang (scenic artists); Kristen O'Malley (set decorator)	NBC

Excellence in Production Design Award – Multi-Camera Television Series

Year	Program	Episode(s)	Nominees	Network
2014 (19th)
2014 (19th)	The Big Bang Theory	"The Locomotive Manipulation", "The Convention Conundrum", "The Status Quo Combustion"	John Shaffner (production designer), Francoise Cherry-Cohen (set designer), Ann Shea (set decorator)	CBS
2014 (19th)	How I Met Your Mother	"How Your Mother Met Me"	Steve Olson (production designer), Daniel Saks (set designer), Susan Eschelbach (set decorator)	CBS
2014 (19th)	Mike & Molly	"Mike & Molly's Excellent Adventure", "The Dice Lady Cometh"	John Shaffner (production designer), Daren Janes (art director), Lynda Burbank (set decorator)	CBS
2014 (19th)	The Millers	"You Are the Wind Beneath My Wings, Man", "CON-Troversy", "Papa Was a Rolling Bone"	Glenda Rovello (production designer), Rhea Rebbe (assistant art director), Kerry Hyatt (graphic designer), Tom Perry (scenic artist), Bryan Venegas (set decorator)	CBS
2014 (19th)	Undateable	"Pilot"	Cabot McMullen (production designer), Jeffrey Beck (set designer), Amber Haley (set decorator)	NBC
2015 (20th)
2015 (20th)	The Big Bang Theory	"The Skywalker Incursion", "The Mystery Date Observation", "The Platonic Permutation"	John Shaffner (production designer), Francoise Cherry-Cohen (set designer), Ann Shea (set decorator)	CBS
2015 (20th)	Clipped	"Dreamers", "Wi-Fi", "World's Rudest Barbershop"	Greg J. Grande (production designer); Bryan Langer (assistant art director); Amy Feldman, Peter M. Gurski (set decorators)	TBS
2015 (20th)	Mom	"Mashed Potatoes and a Little Nitrous", "Sick Popes and a Red Ferrari", "Fun Girl Stuff and Eternal Salvation"	John Shaffner (production designer), Daren Janes (art director), Ann Shea (set decorator)	CBS
2015 (20th)	Truth Be Told	"Pilot", "Big Black Coffee", "Members Only"	Steve Olson (production designer); Matthew Carey, Michael T. Leonard (assistant art directors); Daniel Maltese, Daniel Saks (set designers), Marissa Zajack (graphic designer); Cherie Day Ledwith, Amy Wells (set decorators)	NBC
2015 (20th)	2 Broke Girls	"And the Escape Room", "And the Maybe Baby", "And the Coming Out Party"	Glenda Rovello (production designer), Conny Boettger-Marinos (assistant art designer), Amy Feldman (set decorator)	CBS
2016 (21st)
2016 (21st)	The Great Indoors	"Pilot"	Glenda Rovello (production designer), Michael T. Leonard (set designer), Melinda Ritz (set decorator)	CBS
2016 (21st)	Baby Daddy	"Love and Carriage", "Room-Mating", "Stupid Cupid"	Greg J. Grande (production designer), Raf Lydon (assistant art director), Roya Parivar (set decorator)	Freeform
2016 (21st)	The Big Bang Theory	"The Positive Negative Reaction", "The Big Bear Precipitation", "The Fermentation Bifurcation"	John Shaffner (production designer), Francoise Cherry-Cohen (set designer), Ann Shea (set decorator)	CBS
2016 (21st)	The Ranch	"Leavin' Been Comin' (For a Long, Long Time)"	John Shaffner (production designer), Gail L. Russell (assistant art directors), Tara Stephenson (set decorator)	Netflix
2016 (21st)	2 Broke Girls	"And the 80's Movie", "And the Godmama Drama", "And the Two Openings: Part One"	Glenda Rovello (production designer), Conny Boettger-Marinos (assistant art designer), Amy Feldman (set decorator)	CBS
2017 (22nd)
2017 (22nd)	Will & Grace	"11 Years Later", "A Gay Olde Christmas"	Glenda Rovello (production designer), Conny Boettger-Marinos (art director), TJ Searl (graphic designer), Peter M. Gurski (set decorator)	NBC
2017 (22nd)	The Big Bang Theory	"The Romance Recalibration", "The Separation Agitation", "The Explosion Implosion"	John Shaffner (production designer), Francoise Cherry-Cohen (set designer), Ann Shea (set decorator)	CBS
2017 (22nd)	9JKL	"Pilot", "Lovers Getaway", "Set Visit"	Steve Olson (production designer); Matthew Carey, Michael T. Leonard (assistant art directors); Melinda Ritz (set decorator)	CBS
2017 (22nd)	The Ranch	"My Best Friend", "Last Dollar (Fly Away)", "Wrapped Up in You"	John Shaffner (production designer), Gail L. Russell (assistant art directors), Tara Stephenson (set decorator)	Netflix
2017 (22nd)	Superior Donuts	"Pilot", "Crime Time", "Arthur's Day Off"	Steve Olson (production designer); Matthew Carey, Lissette Schettini (assistant art director); Melinda Ritz (set decorator)	CBS
2018 (23rd)
2018 (23rd)	Sesame Street	"Book Worming", "The Count's Counting Error", "Street Food"	David Gallo (production designer), Elliot Bertoni (art director), Bailey McClure (assistant art director), Ariel Poster (graphic artist), Carly Todd (scenic artist)	HBO
2018 (23rd)	The Big Bang Theory	"The Novelization Correlation", "The Sibling Realignment", "The Bow Tie Asymmetry"	John Shaffner (production designer), Francoise Cherry-Cohen (set designer), Ann Shea (set decorator)	CBS
2018 (23rd)	Murphy Brown	"#MurphyToo"	Jane Musky (production designer); Charles Beal, Casey Smith (assistant art directors); Lynn Tonnessen (set decorator); Jim Tomaselli (graphic artist)	CBS
2018 (23rd)	The Ranch	"Travelin' Prayer", "Tie Our Love (In a Double Knot)", "Fresh Out of Forgiveness"	John Shaffner (production designer), Gail L. Russell (assistant art directors), Tara Stephenson-Fong (set decorator)	Netflix
2018 (23rd)	Will & Grace	"The Three Wise Men", "Tex and the City", "Anchor Away"	Glenda Rovello (production designer), Conny Marinos (art director), Peter Gurski (set decorator)	NBC
2019 (24th)
2019 (24th)	The Big Bang Theory	"The Propagation Proposition", "The Conference Valuation", "The Stockholm Syndrome"	John Shaffner (production designer), Francoise Cherry-Cohen (set designer), Hugo Maldonado (graphic artist), Ann Shea (set decorator)	CBS
2019 (24th)	The Cool Kids	"Vegas, Baby!"	Stephan Olson (production designer), Chad Dellinger (assistant art director), Jerie Kelter (set decorator)	Fox
2019 (24th)	Family Reunion	"Remember Black Elvis?"	Aiyana Trotter (production designer), Lissette Schettini (assistant art director), Daniel Maltese (set designer), Cabot McMullen (visual consultant), Roya Parivar (set decorator)	Netflix
2019 (24th)	No Good Nick	"The Italian Job"	Kristan Andrews (production designer), Sarah Palmrose (art director), Allison Lopes (assistant art director), Chris Allison (set designer), Hilary DeWaay (graphic designer), Britt Woods (set decorator)	Netflix
2019 (24th)	Will & Grace	"Family Trip", "Conscious Coupling", "The Things We Do for Love"	Glenda Rovello (production designer), Conny Boettger-Marinos (art director), Peter Gurski (set decorator)	NBC

=== 2020s ===
Year	Program	Episode(s)	Nominees	Network
2020 (25th)
2020 (25th)	Will & Grace	"Accidentally On Porpoise", "We Love Lucy", "It's Time"	Glenda Rovello (production designer), Conny Marinos (art director), Hugo Maldonado (graphic artist), Peter Gurski (set decorator)	NBC
2020 (25th)	Bob Hearts Abishola	"Randy's a Wrangler", "Paris is for Lovers, Not Mothers", "Straight Outta Lagos"	John Shaffner (production designer), Francoise Cherry-Cohen (art director), Ann Shea (set decorator)	CBS
2020 (25th)	The Expanding Universe of Ashley Garcia	"Unintended Consequences"	Josee F. Lemmonier (production designer), Tracy NeJame (art director), Raelyn Tepper (set decorator)	Netflix
2020 (25th)	Family Reunion	"Remember When Jade Was Down With The Swirl?", "Remember When Shaka Got Beat Up?"	Aiyana Trotter (production designer), Lissette Schettini (assistant art director), Daniel Maltese (set designer), Roya Parivar (set decorator)	Netflix
2020 (25th)	The Neighborhood	"Welcome to the New Pastor", "Welcome to the Hockey Game"	Wendell Johnson (production designer), Amy Skjonsby-Winslow (art director), Ron Olsen (set decorator)	CBS
2021 (26th)
2021 (26th)	Family Reunion	"Remember When M'Dear Changed History?"	Aiyana Trotter (production designer), Lissette Schettini (assistant art director), Glenn Williams (set designer), Roya Parivar (set decorator)	Netflix
2021 (26th)	Bob Hearts Abishola	"Bowango"	Francoise Cherry-Cohen (production designer), Gail Russell (art director), Ann Shea (set decorator)	CBS
2021 (26th)	Call Your Mother	"Pilot"	Glenda Rovello (production designer), Conny Marinos (art director), Hugo Maldonado (graphic artist), Amy Feldman (set decorator)	ABC
2021 (26th)	The Conners	"A Stomach Ache, A Heartbreak and a Grave Mistake", "An Old Dog, New Tricks and a Ticket to Ride"	John Schaffner (production designer), Jerry Dunn (assistant art director), Hugo Maldonado (graphic artist), Anne Ahrens (set decorator)	ABC
2021 (26th)	Punky Brewster	"Put a Ring on It"	Kristan Andrews (production designer), Yvonne Garnier-Hackl (art director), Sarah Brown (set designer), Hilary Dewaay (graphic artist), Jennifer Fulmer (set decorator)	Peacock
2022 (27th)
2022 (27th)	How I Met Your Father	"Pilot"	Glenda Rovello (production designer), Conny Boetter-Marinos (art director), Amy Feldman (set designer), Hugo Maldonado (graphic designer)	Hulu
2022 (27th)	Bob Hearts Abishola	"Inner Boss Bitch"; "Two Rusty Tractors"; "Estee Lauder and Goat Meat"	Francoise Cherry-Cohen (production designer), Gail L. Russell (assistant art director), Ann Shea (set decorator)	CBS
2022 (27th)	The Conners	"Sex, Lies, and House Hunting"; "The Best Laid Plans"; "A Contrabassoon and A Sinking Feeling"	Jerry Dunn (production designer), Bhargavi Anganarasu (assistant art director)	ABC
2022 (27th)	The Neighborhood	"Welcome to the Remodel"	Wendell Johnson (production designer), Amy Skjonsby-Winslow (art director), Ron Olsen (set decorator)	CBS
2022 (27th)	United States of Al	"Kiss/Maach"; "Divorce/Talaq"; "Sock/Jeraab"	Daren Janes (production designer), Kerry Hennessey (assistant art director), Susan Mina Eschelbach (set decorator)	CBS
2023 (28th)
2023 (28th)	Frasier	"Moving In"	Glenda Rovello (production designer)	Paramount+
2023 (28th)	Bob Hearts Abishola	"Twerk O' Clock"	Francoise Cherry-Cohen (production designer)	CBS
2023 (28th)	Bunk'd	"The Glitching Hour"	Kelly Hogan (production designer)	Disney Channel
2023 (28th)	The Conners	"Road Trip and Guilt Trip"	Jerry Dunn (production designer)	ABC
2023 (28th)	That '90s Show	"Free Leia"	Greg J. Grande (production designer)	Netflix
2024 (29th)
2024 (29th)	Frasier	"All About Eve"	Glenda Rovello (production designer)	Paramount+
2024 (29th)	Bunk'd	"Busk a Move"; "Cold Feet, Hot Brobblers"	Kelly Hogan (production designer)	Disney Channel
2024 (29th)	Poppa's House	"Family Photo"; "Wig"	Aiyana Trotter (production designer)	CBS
2024 (29th)	That '90s Show	"I Can See Clearly Now"; "Just a Friend"; "Something to Talk About"	Greg J. Grande (production designer)	Netflix
2024 (29th)	Wizards Beyond Waverly Place	"Saved by the Spell"; "Something Wizard This Way Comes"	Kelly Hogan (production designer)	Disney Channel
2025 (30th)
2025 (30th)	Mid-Century Modern	"Bye, George"	Glenda Rovello (production designer)	Hulu
2025 (30th)	Mid-Century Modern	"Love Thy Neighbor"	Greg J. Grande (production designer)	Hulu
2025 (30th)	Poppa's House	"Baby Girl"; "Magic Shine Again"	Aiyana Trotter (production designer)	CBS
2025 (30th)	Vampirina: Teenage Vampire	"First Nightmare"	Maggie Ruder (production designer)	Disney Channel
2025 (30th)	Wizards Beyond Waverly Place	"The Wizard at the End of the World Part II"	Kelly Hogan (production designer)	Disney Channel

== Programs with multiple awards ==
4 awards

- Will & Grace (NBC)

3 awards

- The Big Bang Theory (CBS)
- Mad TV (Fox)
- Saturday Night Live (NBC)

2 awards

- Frasier (Paramount+)

== Programs with multiple nominations ==
10 nominations

- How I Met Your Mother (CBS)

9 nominations

- The Big Bang Theory (CBS)

8 nominations

- Will & Grace (NBC)

5 nominations

- Saturday Night Live (NBC)
- Two and a Half Men (CBS)

4 nominations

- 2 Broke Girls (CBS)
- Bob Hearts Abishola (CBS)
- Frasier (NBC/Paramount+)

3 nominations

- The Conners (ABC)
- Family Reunion (Netflix)
- Mad TV (Fox)
- The Ranch (Netflix)
- Star Trek: Voyager (UPN)

2 nominations

- Bunk'd (Disney)
- Hell's Kitchen (Fox)
- Life with Bonnie (ABC)
- Mid-Century Modern (Hulu)
- The Neighborhood (CBS)
- Poppa's House (CBS)
- Rules of Engagement (CBS)
- That '90s Show (Netflix)
- Titus (Fox)
- The Voice (NBC)
- Wizards Beyond Waverly Place (Disney)
