= Mark Jordan Legan =

Mark Jordan Legan is an American television producer, writer, film historian and radio personality.

== Career ==
He has written for the television programs Gary Unmarried, Dave's World, Grace Under Fire, The Fighting Fitzgeralds, A.N.T. Farm,Mighty Med and Chesapeake Shores.

He created the critically acclaimed satire Thanks and co-wrote the controversial terrorism comedy The Cell, which landed him on the cover of the New York Times Arts & Leisure section ("Funniest script in Hollywood that no one will ever make.").

He appeared regularly on NPR's Day to Day where he wrote and hosted the "Bad Movie" podcasts that spotlight strange, weird and offbeat cinema from around the world. He also writes and hosts the video series, "NPR & Slate's Summary Judgment" as well as "Summary Judgment" and "The Worst Cinematic Crap That's Ever Been Made" for SlateV.com. He now is a regular contributor to public radio stations KPCC and KCRW in Southern California, where his latest pop culture segment, The Binge, can be heard monthly.

Mark recently launched a brand new podcast "Film Freaks Forever" with his friend and frequent writing partner, Phoef Sutton. It can be heard at all the major podcast sites.
