= The Countdown Reflection =

- The Big Bang Theory episode
- Episode no.: Season 5 Episode 24
- Directed by: Mark Cendrowski
- Story by: Bill Prady; Eric Kaplan; Steve Holland
- Teleplay by: Chuck Lorre; Steven Molaro; Jim Reynolds
- Production code: 3X6874
- Original air date: May 10, 2012
- Running time: 21 minutes

Guest appearances
- Mike Massimino as himself; Amy Tolsky as Joan; Carol Ann Susi as Mrs. Wolowitz; Casey Sander as Mike Rostenkowski; Pasha Lychnikoff as Dimitri Rezinov

Episode chronology
← Previous "The Launch Acceleration"	Next → "The Date Night Variable"
- The Big Bang Theory season 5

"The Countdown Reflection" is the 24th and final episode of the fifth season of The Big Bang Theory. It first aired on CBS on May 10, 2012. It is the 111th episode overall. In the episode, featuring astronaut Mike Massimino, Howard and Bernadette get married before Howard goes to space. "The Countdown Reflection" received 13.72 million views in the U.S. and garnered mostly positive reviews.

== Plot ==
Howard is in a Soyuz capsule with Mike Massimino and Dimitri Rezinov, about to launch to the International Space Station, while Bernadette, Raj, Leonard, Sheldon and Penny are watching on television at Sheldon and Leonard's apartment. Nervous and not looking forward to the launch, Howard begins to reflect on the last couple of days, revealing that he married Bernadette before he left.

When Howard gives Bernadette a necklace from with a star pendant on it which he plans to take with him to space, she tells him that they need to get married before he goes to space. They decide to get married in City Hall that very afternoon with only their friends as guests. Amy is devastated that her position as maid of honor has been reduced to nothing, but is allowed to wear the dress she bought to City Hall. At City Hall, Sheldon reveals to the others that Leonard proposed to Penny during sex, making Leonard and Penny feel very uncomfortable. Howard and Bernadette fail to get married as the place closes before they reach the front of the queue.

At a branch of The Cheesecake Factory, everyone discusses ideas for Howard's and Bernadette's marriage. Raj and Leonard come up with the idea that they could get married on the roof of Leonard, Sheldon and Penny's apartment building block, when the Google Maps satellite is passing directly overhead to take new pictures and they can have the new image of the roof be the picture of their wedding cards taken from space. Sheldon, Leonard, Raj, Penny and Amy all go online to get ordained as ministers to perform the ceremony.

Howard's mother is at the wedding, albeit off-screen, along with Bernadette's father. While there is some tension between Leonard and Penny after his clumsy proposal, the five ministers each say some words before the couple exchange their vows. As they share their first marital kiss, the camera pulls back from the apartment roof to reveal that the floor has been decorated like a heart with an arrow through it, starting with Bernadette's dress - also showing a glimpse of Mrs. Wolowitz - and then zooms out further to a view of the planet Earth.

The episode ends back in the present, with Howard, Dimitri, and Mike in the Soyuz capsule. When the rocket engines ignite and the final countdown begins, everyone nervously watches the space launch from Leonard and Sheldon's apartment. Bernadette takes Raj's hand, Penny takes Leonard's hand, and a very surprised Amy has her hand taken by Sheldon, who wishes Howard well with the words "Boldly go, Howard Wolowitz." The countdown reaches zero and the episode concludes with the rocket blasting off.

== Reception ==
=== Ratings ===
The episode was first broadcast in America on May 10, 2012 on CBS to an audience of 13.72 million viewers. It achieved a Nielsen rating of 4.4/15 among the age range 18–49. In Canada, the episode aired on the same day, and was watched by 4.035 million households. It was the most watched show on CTV Television Network that week.

=== Reviews ===
The season finale received mostly positive reviews. Oliver Sava of The A.V. Club gave the episode an A−, saying that the season finale "feels like a significant change for the series". Sava opined that "The Countdown Reflection" was not "as funny as last week's episode", but "delivers when it comes to that quality that has always been [The] Big Bang Theory's strongest suit: heart". He also said that "Penny and Leonard make a good couple in theory, but not so much in practice". R. L. Shaffer of IGN scored the episode 9.0 out of 10. Shaffer called the framing device of Howard in the capsule "pretty awesome" and said that the show featured "a better balance of geeky jokes, relationship humor, character and Sheldonisms" than the rest of the fifth season, as well as "a decent share of touching moments".

Carla Day of TV Fanatic gave the episode 4.8 out of 5, saying that "I didn't care for the flow of the episode with Howard about to blast off and the wedding in a flashback, but that last scene of the finale made it all come together". Robin Pierson of The TV Critic rated the episode 41/100, calling it a "very disappointing finale". Pierson said that Howard and Bernadette "make a nice couple", but that the script was "lazy" and "uninspired".
