= Faye Oshima Belyeu =

American television producer

- Occupation: Television producer

Faye Oshima Belyeu is an American television producer.

== Career ==
Oshima Belyeu produced the situation comedies True Colors (Fox) from 1990 to 1992, Dave's World (CBS) from 1993 to 1995, and Caroline in the City (NBC) from 1995 to 1999. She next produced Titus (2000) for FOX and The Fighting Fitzgeralds (2001) and In-Laws (2002–2003) for NBC, followed by All About the Andersons (2003) and Commando Nanny (2004) for The WB. Oshima Belyeu's subsequent project was I'm with Her for ABC from 2003 to 2004, followed by Courting Alex for CBS in 2006. She had been the producer on CBS' The Big Bang Theory from 2007 to 2010.
