= The Big Bang Theory season 7 =

The Big Bang Theory
- Season 7
- DVD cover art
- Showrunner: Steven Molaro
- Starring: Johnny Galecki; Jim Parsons; Kaley Cuoco; Simon Helberg; Kunal Nayyar; Mayim Bialik; Melissa Rauch
- No. of episodes: 24

Release
- Original network: CBS
- Original release: September 26, 2013 – May 15, 2014

Season chronology
- ← Previous; Season 6 Next → Season 8

The seventh season of the American television sitcom The Big Bang Theory aired on CBS from September 26, 2013 to May 15, 2014.

Kaley Cuoco was credited as "Kaley Cuoco-Sweeting" from "The Convention Conundrum" and onwards after her wedding with Ryan Sweeting on December 31, 2013. Mayim Bialik submitted the episode "The Indecision Amalgamation" for consideration due to her nomination for the Primetime Emmy Award for Outstanding Supporting Actress in a Comedy Series at the 66th Primetime Emmy Awards. Jim Parsons won the Primetime Emmy Award for Outstanding Lead Actor in a Comedy Series at the 66th Primetime Emmy Awards for the episode "The Relationship Diremption". Bob Newhart submitted the episode "The Proton Transmogrification" for consideration due to his nomination for the Primetime Emmy Award for Outstanding Guest Actor in a Comedy Series at the 66th Primetime Creative Arts Emmy Awards. Lucasfilm helped with the creation of the episode.

== Production ==
In January 2011, the series was picked up for a fifth, sixth and seventh season through the 2013–14 television season.

Production for the seventh season began on August 14, 2013.

This is the first season in which Amy and Bernadette appear in every episode.

== Cast ==
=== Main cast ===
- Johnny Galecki as Dr. Leonard Hofstadter
- Jim Parsons as Dr. Sheldon Cooper
- Kaley Cuoco as Penny
- Simon Helberg as Howard Wolowitz
- Kunal Nayyar as Dr. Rajesh "Raj" Koothrappali
- Mayim Bialik as Dr. Amy Farrah Fowler
- Melissa Rauch as Dr. Bernadette Rostenkowski-Wolowitz

=== Special guest cast ===
- Bill Nye as himself
- Ira Flatow as himself
- James Earl Jones as himself
- Carrie Fisher as herself

=== Recurring cast ===
- Regina King as Janine Davis
- Kevin Sussman as Stuart Bloom
- Christine Baranski as Dr. Beverly Hofstadter
- Bob Newhart as Dr. Arthur Jeffries/Professor Proton
- Kate Micucci as Lucy
- Carol Ann Susi as Mrs. Wolowitz
- Casey Sander as Mike Rostenkowski
- Brian Thomas Smith as Zack Johnson
- Wil Wheaton as himself
- John Ross Bowie as Dr. Barry Kripke
- Laurie Metcalf as Mary Cooper
- Ian Scott Rudolph as Captain Sweatpants
- Michael Massimino as himself
- Laura Spencer as Emily Sweeney
- Brian Posehn as Dr. "Bert" Bertram Kibbler
- Stephen Hawking as himself (voice-over)

=== Guest cast ===
- Sophie Oda as Grace
- Aaron Takahashi as a Scientist
- Todd Eric Andrews as Dr. Gunderson
- Morgan Hewitt as Lizzy
- Josh Peck as Jesse
- Tania Raymonde as Yvette
- Christopher Neiman as Dr. Dreyfus
- Kimberly Hebert Gregory as Ms. Davora
- Steve Valentine as Kenneth
- Monica Garcia as Maria

== Episodes ==
No. overall	No. in season	Title	Directed by	Written by	Original release date	Prod. code	U.S. viewers (millions)
136	1	"The Hofstadter Insufficiency"	Mark Cendrowski	Story by : Chuck Lorre & Steven Molaro & Tara Hernandez; Teleplay by : Eric Kaplan & Jim Reynolds & Steve Holland	September 26, 2013	4X5301	18.99
Penny and Sheldon bond over missing Leonard. She calls Leonard, who is partying on his ship, clearly not missing her. Penny suggests exchanging secrets with Sheldon, saying she appeared topless in an unreleased horror movie, Serial Ape-ist - not new to Sheldon, as Howard found the clip when they first met. Sheldon's "secret" is disliking YouTube's new rating system - trivial to Penny, who almost leaves in annoyance, but stays and apologizes on realizing she hurt Sheldon's feelings. Meanwhile, Raj talks to the recently divorced Mrs. Davis at a university function, apologizing to her after initially insulting her with inappropriate statements about her marital problems. He insists he is not hitting on her, but later tells Howard they "had a moment". At a biology convention, Amy and Bernadette are surprised when two men buy them drinks. Bernadette implies Amy's enthusiasm stems from her hunger for romantic affection from Sheldon, but they make up and Bernadette reveals she was attracted to the man resembling Sheldon, Amy preferring the one resembling Howard.
137	2	"The Deception Verification"	Mark Cendrowski	Story by : Chuck Lorre & Eric Kaplan & Jim Reynolds; Teleplay by : Steven Molaro & Steve Holland & Maria Ferrari	September 26, 2013	4X5302	20.44
Leonard surprises Penny by arriving back early and hiding in her apartment, so they can spend some time alone. Sheldon suspects that Penny is cheating on Leonard when he realises that someone else is in her apartment. Bursting in to catch her in the act, he and Amy find Leonard there. Sheldon is mad at Leonard for not telling him that he is home, and refuses to believe anything he says, though with Howard's help they eventually reconcile. As for Howard himself, he experiences weight gain and mood swings; he had applied estrogen ointment to his mother without gloves; inadvertently absorbing it through his skin. Raj reassures him in an intimate manner, shocking Bernadette. While the gang is having dinner at their apartment, Leonard notices that Raj can talk to women without consuming alcohol. They reveal that this happened after he left for the North Sea expedition.
138	3	"The Scavenger Vortex"	Mark Cendrowski	Story by : Dave Goetsch & Eric Kaplan & Steve Holland; Teleplay by : Steven Molaro & Jim Reynolds & Maria Ferrari	October 3, 2013	4X5303	18.22
After the gang blows off Raj's murder-mystery party, he creates a scavenger hunt with ten clues to guide the winner to the location of a gold coin. They first propose making each couple a team, but Leonard suggests picking names out of a hat instead to "mix it up". Penny gets angry, assuming he did so to avoid being hindered by her. As a result, the teams are pairs who do not normally interact with each other: Sheldon and Penny, Howard and Amy, and Leonard and Bernadette. Despite their differences, Penny and Sheldon each do well figuring out clues as they race around Pasadena. Bernadette is very competitive, while Leonard is distracted thinking Penny is mad at him, causing Bernadette to fib about Penny insulting him in order to win. Amy and Howard bond over a mutual love of Neil Diamond's music, and eventually abandon the hunt to karaoke his songs in The Cheesecake Factory. During the final stretch, Leonard, Bernadette and Penny deduce that the coin is in Sheldon's spot and race upstairs, only to find no coins there. Finally, Raj reveals he slipped a gold coin into everyone's pocket so that all would win: his goal was to teach the value of friendship. To his dismay, Leonard, Penny and Bernadette are angry there is no clear winner despite all their efforts, and chase him out of the apartment.
139	4	"The Raiders Minimization"	Mark Cendrowski	Story by : Chuck Lorre & Jim Reynolds & Tara Hernandez; Teleplay by : Steven Molaro & Steve Holland & Maria Ferrari	October 10, 2013	4X5304	17.64
Amy and Sheldon watch Raiders of the Lost Ark. When he asks what she thought of it, Amy remarks that Indiana Jones is superfluous to the story as the outcome would have been the same without him. Dejected that he cannot rebut her argument, Sheldon tries to find something Amy loves which he can spoil for her. Sheldon watches Amy's favorite TV show Little House on the Prairie with her and points out historical inaccuracies. Amy realizes his purpose and says he should just let her know if he is angry, not seek revenge. He reluctantly agrees and Amy apologizes. For her psychology class, Penny buys The Disappointing Child, a book by Leonard's mother, in which she wrote about his childhood problems, which upsets Leonard. When Penny is unsympathetic, he exaggerates his distress to get her to have frequent sex with him. Leonard mentions it to Howard who unsuccessfully tries it with Bernadette, but she tells Penny. Penny takes revenge by wearing a babydoll outfit, only to leave a pantless Leonard skyping with his mother. Meanwhile, Raj and Stuart, depressed when women checking out their newly-uploaded online dating site profiles leave no messages, realize dating sites do not work for them any better than face-to-face encounters.
140	5	"The Workplace Proximity"	Mark Cendrowski	Story by : Steven Molaro & Steve Holland & Maria Ferrari; Teleplay by : Chuck Lorre & Eric Kaplan & Jim Reynolds	October 17, 2013	4X5305	17.80
Amy tells Sheldon she will be working on an experiment at Caltech and asks Sheldon how he feels about it - no problem for Sheldon until Howard explains he would not want to work with Bernadette and be with her day and night. Sheldon withdraws his approval, but Amy says she will still take the job. Sheldon mentions Howard's comments to Bernadette, who then confronts Howard and gets mad after he tries to deny his statements, forcing Howard to stay at Raj's place. The next day, Amy is even madder at Sheldon when he embarrasses her at lunch in front of her colleagues. Bernadette later comes over to Raj's apartment to apologize to Howard, who promises to spend more time with her, but only after he and Raj finish their video game, once again enraging Bernadette. At home, Penny and Leonard explain to Sheldon that Amy is right, so he goes to her apartment and apologizes, but re-offends her by saying she can be difficult to put up with. At the Cheesecake Factory, both Amy and Bernadette are upset with their significant others. Penny assures them that Leonard will talk to them and set them straight; instead, the guys play skeet shooting with lasers and balloons in the apartment.
141	6	"The Romance Resonance"	Mark Cendrowski	Story by : Eric Kaplan & Jim Reynolds & Tara Hernandez; Teleplay by : Steven Molaro & Steve Holland & Maria Ferrari	October 24, 2013	4X5306	16.98
Sheldon, unbeknownst to him, calculates how to synthesize a new, stable superheavy element, but then realizes that his discovery was erroneous, which spoils his achievement and makes him feel a fraud. His friends, co-workers and the scientific community praise him, but Sheldon just wants it to stop. Amy finally tells him he does not deserve the attention, for Sheldon the most romantic thing Amy could ever say. Howard has everyone join him in performing a song he wrote for Bernadette to commemorate the anniversary of their first date. However, Bernadette is quarantined after an accident at her lab so Howard and the gang sing the song for her at the hospital. Leonard says Penny never does anything romantic for him; even Raj's advice fails to inspire her. Penny then gifts Leonard a first edition of The Hitchhiker's Guide to the Galaxy - his favorite book growing up. Leonard appreciates the gesture but tells her that he already has a first edition of the same book. Penny feels bad and tells him she wishes she could be as romantic as he, showing him a box of dozens of mementos, examples of his romantic gestures during their time together. Leonard is moved, finding it incredibly romantic that Penny kept these things.
142	7	"The Proton Displacement"	Mark Cendrowski	Story by : Chuck Lorre & Maria Ferrari & Anthony Del Broccolo; Teleplay by : Steven Molaro & Eric Kaplan & Jim Reynolds	November 7, 2013	4X5307	16.89
Sheldon, Leonard and Amy run into Dr. Arthur Jeffries (known as "Professor Proton") at the drug store. Arthur emails Leonard to ask him to review his recent paper. Sheldon wonders why he was not asked; Amy says he can be annoying. Sheldon goes to apologize, but annoys Arthur further. The next day, Sheldon informs them his new friend is another famous TV scientist, Bill Nye "The Science Guy." After Sheldon and Bill leave, Arthur asks Leonard why he lives with Sheldon. Leonard explains he is the smartest person he knows, despite his quirks, and they need each other. As Leonard's answer moves him, Arthur asks Sheldon to review his paper and even stays for a cup of tea but only after seeing Penny in the guys' apartment. Meanwhile, Howard crashes in on Raj and the girls making jewelry during girls' night, and takes over by offering them better equipment, upsetting Raj. Howard joins the girls again for another girls' night; Raj feels left out but cannot express his feelings. Raj mocks Howard, who apologizes on discovering how much Raj's feelings were hurt. Feeling bad, Raj makes a pair of lightsaber belt buckles using techniques Howard taught him.
143	8	"The Itchy Brain Simulation"	Mark Cendrowski	Story by : Steven Molaro & Bill Prady & Jim Reynolds; Teleplay by : Eric Kaplan & Steve Holland & Maria Ferrari	November 14, 2013	4X5308	18.30
Leonard finds a DVD he rented using Sheldon's card, that should have been returned seven years before. He pleads with Sheldon not to flip out, who to his surprise remains calm. He makes Leonard wear an itchy sweater until the DVD issue is resolved, so that Leonard can, metaphorically, walk in Sheldon's shoes. Leonard searches for the DVD store (long out of business), then for the owner (deceased), then the owner's (nonexistent) next-of-kin, all the while getting a bad rash from the sweater. Sheldon eventually tells Leonard he had discovered the DVD and paid the fine years before, and that he just wanted him to learn the lesson. Penny meets Lucy, Raj's ex-girlfriend, at the Cheesecake Factory and is mad at her for breaking up with him by email. Lucy calls Raj to have coffee to apologize. Raj hopes they can get back together, but Lucy reveals she is now dating someone else. Penny then sets up Raj on a date with her friend Lizzy, but Raj freaks out in front of her.
144	9	"The Thanksgiving Decoupling"	Mark Cendrowski	Story by : Eric Kaplan & Steve Holland & Maria Ferrari; Teleplay by : Steven Molaro & Jim Reynolds & Jeremy Howe	November 21, 2013	4X5309	18.94
The gang spends Thanksgiving at Mrs. Wolowitz's house. As she is laid up in bed (because her gout is acting up), Raj, Bernadette and Amy cook. Penny recalls her Thanksgiving in Las Vegas with her ex-boyfriend Zack in 2010, and their "fake" wedding. Her friends tell her the wedding was real, so she is legally married, causing tension between her and Leonard. Penny invites Zack over to sign the annulment papers to end their marriage (to the excitement of Raj, Bernadette and Amy). Zack is at first reluctant to sign, but Penny demands he do so, reconciling with Leonard shortly afterwards. Meanwhile, Howard tries to bond with his father-in-law, Mike, who instead starts to bond over football with Sheldon, who is very knowledgeable as he was forced to watch the game with his father as a child. After Mike shares beers with Sheldon to comfort him because his father died while he was young, they continue to hit it off. Amy orders a drunk Sheldon to apologize to Howard after insulting him. Sheldon compliments Amy, and then swats her on the rear and suggests she get them more beers. Amy is shocked, but delighted at the physical attention. Mike finally compliments Howard, but then attributes his kindness to being drunk.
145	10	"The Discovery Dissipation"	Mark Cendrowski	Story by : Eric Kaplan & Jim Reynolds & Maria Ferrari; Teleplay by : Steven Molaro & Steve Holland & Adam Faberman	December 5, 2013	4X5310	15.63
Sheldon walks out of an interview with Ira Flatow on NPR's Science Friday after Flatow refers to Sheldon's heavy element discovery being accidental. Amy has Wil Wheaton talk with Sheldon about how to deal with unwanted fame. Later, Leonard reveals he disproved the existence of Sheldon's heavy element through his experiments. This infuriates Sheldon, who can now deal with fame and feels Leonard took away the one thing that made him famous. Sheldon's fury peaks when Barry Kripke berates him over Leonard's findings. Sheldon and Leonard argue with each other on Science Friday, while an embarrassed Amy and Penny listen. While Raj's apartment building is being fumigated, he and his dog, Cinnamon, move in with Howard and Bernadette for a week. Though Raj is very kind and helpful, his presence highlights deficiencies in Howard and Bernadette's relationship, leading them to quarrel. Eventually Raj is thrown out, and he attempts to sleep over at Leonard and Sheldon's apartment. He immediately gives Amy and Sheldon relationship advice; after he advises Amy to be patient with Sheldon's limits on physical contact, she makes Raj leave.
146	11	"The Cooper Extraction"	Mark Cendrowski	Story by : Steven Molaro & Eric Kaplan & Maria Ferrari; Teleplay by : Jim Reynolds & Steve Holland & Tara Hernandez	December 12, 2013	4X5311	17.68
Sheldon travels to Texas to help with his sister's home birth, but is as usual totally self-absorbed and unsympathetic to her discomfort, and no help at all. Between video calls, his friends wonder how their lives would be had they never met him (as in It's a Wonderful Life). Penny notes Leonard would have been too afraid to date her, Bernadette thinks she would not be with Howard because of his strange friendship with Raj, and Leonard speculates Penny would be living with Zack, who would trade money for useless items such as beans. Amy suggests that if Leonard had not moved in, Penny would have tried to seduce Sheldon in Leonard's absence, while Howard notes he would be caring for his mother even after her death (referencing Psycho), and Raj and Leonard suggest they would be obese flatmates owing to Raj's cooking and Leonard's loneliness. Amy thinks she would be sad and alone. After Amy encourages Sheldon to be with his newborn nephew, Raj observes that Amy has significantly influenced Sheldon, and Leonard shows her her picture on Sheldon's screensaver, among the other scientists Sheldon admires. On returning home, Sheldon tells Amy he would have preferred her to have been in Texas with him (or instead of him). In a final Cheesecake Factory scene with Howard and the obese Raj and Leonard, Leonard asks Penny out; she turns him down to reveal she is dating an extremely cool Stuart. The scene changes to reveal this as Stuart's fantasy while sitting alone in the restaurant.
147	12	"The Hesitation Ramification"	Mark Cendrowski	Story by : Dave Goetsch & Jim Reynolds & Tara Hernandez; Teleplay by : Steven Molaro & Steve Holland & Maria Ferrari	January 2, 2014	4X5312	19.20
Penny is ecstatic to get a minor role on NCIS but is devastated when her scene is cut. While comforting her, Leonard accidentally suggests her scene would have made no difference to her career, which upsets her. She demands he honestly tell her his opinion on her acting, and he admits to believing she has unrealistic ambitions for success. Later realizing his honesty may have hurt Penny, Leonard brings her an offer to audition for a part in the new Star Wars movie by submitting a video. Penny gets drunk and proposes to Leonard after thinking the only good thing in her life is him. Because Penny is upset and drunk, Leonard hesitates to answer, so Penny leaves, and Leonard is left wondering if their relationship might be over. At Howard's advice, Raj and Stuart go to the mall to improve their ability to talk to women but only manage to talk to the security guard. After realizing no-one finds him funny, Sheldon wants to learn to become more humorous and attempts to develop a universal theory of humor. He bores Amy by asking which words she finds funny. Bernadette admits to Howard she often fakes a laugh at his jokes.
148	13	"The Occupation Recalibration"	Mark Cendrowski	Story by : Eric Kaplan & Maria Ferrari & Tara Hernandez; Teleplay by : Steven Molaro & Jim Reynolds & Steve Holland	January 9, 2014	4X5313	20.35
The day after her drunk proposal, Penny admits to Leonard that he did the right thing stopping her, and that she has quit the Cheesecake Factory to concentrate on her acting career. Despite saying he supports her, Leonard is not thrilled with her quitting. Meanwhile Sheldon, forced into taking vacation time, ends up tagging along with Penny. He says he supports her decision, comparing it to his devoting his life to becoming a physicist. Leonard eventually says that though he could not take a risk like hers, he is proud of Penny for doing so. Geologist Bert brings Amy pretty rocks each day to flirt with her. She is oblivious until Howard and Raj point it out. Despite telling Bert she has a boyfriend, Amy is guilt-tripped into attending a "mineral and rock show" with him. Howard and Raj talk to Bert to get Amy out of it, and they attend the show with Bert instead. Bernadette accidentally damages one of Howard's comic books, and heads to Stuart for help. As he does not have the issue, he reluctantly takes her to a rival store. The owner, Jesse, insults Stuart, so Bernadette scolds Jesse and leaves without the comic. She later returns to Jesse's store alone and continues to berate him, nevertheless purchasing the comic.
149	14	"The Convention Conundrum"	Mark Cendrowski	Story by : Eric Kaplan & Jim Reynolds & Adam Faberman; Teleplay by : Steven Molaro & Dave Goetsch & Steve Holland	January 30, 2014	4X5315	19.05
After the guys fail to obtain Comic-Con tickets, Sheldon wants to create his own comic book convention. He decides to ask James Earl Jones, the voice of Darth Vader, to be the celebrity guest at his new event. Sheldon finds out where Jones is eating and approaches him. Unlike most of Sheldon's idols, Jones is not turned off by Sheldon's obsessive personality and hero-worship. Jones takes Sheldon out for a night on the town, visiting an ice cream parlor, a carnival, and a strip club, doing karaoke together ("The Lion Sleeps Tonight"), ringing Carrie Fisher's doorbell and running away, and finally visiting a sauna, where Sheldon begins to get somewhat sick of Jones's company. After he learns the guys did not get Comic-Con tickets, Jones invites Sheldon and his friends to be his guests and promises to take Sheldon to Tijuana every night. Meanwhile, Leonard, Raj, and Howard plan to meet with a ticket scalper to get tickets, but chicken out to avoid trouble that could later affect their careers. The girls go to a tea room to "feel grown-up", but only mothers and their daughters are there so they move on to the bar and wonder what is so great about being adults since acting as "proper" grown-ups is quite boring.
150	15	"The Locomotive Manipulation"	Mark Cendrowski	Story by : Jim Reynolds & Steve Holland & Tara Hernandez; Teleplay by : Steven Molaro & Eric Kaplan & Maria Ferrari	February 6, 2014	4X5314	17.53
Amy plans a romantic Valentine's Day for her and Sheldon by having dinner with Howard and Bernadette on the Napa Valley Wine Train. Sheldon finds a friend in Eric who is equally crazy about trains, ruining Amy's plan. After she confronts him, Sheldon points out that Amy proposed the trip in the first place, prompting her to confess her trick and say she "deserves romance". Sheldon gets angry and offers her various sarcastic romantic gestures, including drinking wine, staring into each other's eyes, and kissing; however, the supposedly fake kiss becomes a real one, marking the first time Sheldon initiated physical contact between the two. Sheldon even seems to like the intimacy, as he invites Amy to visit the train's engine with him. While Leonard and Penny are supposed to be sitting Raj's dog Cinnamon, she eats the chocolates Penny gave Leonard. They rush her to the vet and are joined by an outraged Raj, who connects with the vet, Yvette, since both own dogs and disapprove of what Leonard and Penny did. At home, a surprised Raj discovers she gave him her phone number.
151	16	"The Table Polarization"	Gay Linvill	Story by : Steven Molaro & Maria Ferrari & Tara Hernandez; Teleplay by : Chuck Lorre & Jim Reynolds & Steve Holland	February 27, 2014	4X5316	17.73
Leonard and Penny decide to get a dining table for the apartment so that they no longer have to eat around the coffee table. Sheldon objects to the change, blaming Penny for changing Leonard, though she points out that Amy has changed Sheldon. Unhappy with this and that Amy told her about the kiss, he decides to break up with Amy. Penny alerts Amy, who agrees to break up, but blocks Sheldon's plan by convincing him that Leonard is manipulating him. Amy feeds Sheldon arguments against Leonard, but goes too far when she suggests they move in together. Finally, Amy and Sheldon eat together on the sofa, with the others at the table, until everyone pities Sheldon and all end up back at the coffee table. NASA asks Howard to revisit the International Space Station. He has forgotten his horrible first time, and eagerly wants to return. Bernadette holds an intervention where Howard is reminded he would have to go through survival training again. Howard finds a way out by phoning his mother during his blood pressure test, thus failing his physical.
152	17	"The Friendship Turbulence"	Mark Cendrowski	Story by : Steven Molaro & Eric Kaplan & Tara Hernandez; Teleplay by : Jim Reynolds & Steve Holland & Maria Ferrari	March 6, 2014	4X5318	18.09
Penny informs the group she has turned down an offer to reprise her role in the sequel to the bad horror movie she starred in - Serial Ape-ist 2: Monkey See. Monkey Kill. Later, Penny's car breaks down leaving her no way to get to auditions, and her Serial Ape-ist role has been recast to another actress, so she considers resuming her Cheesecake Factory job. Leonard surprises her with a new car, so she can further pursue her acting career. Sheldon insults Howard, and Bernadette wants to know why he always does so. Sheldon details a decade of pranks and abuse. Howard wants to be a better friend and invites Sheldon to a weekend at NASA in Houston where Howard has a speaking engagement and Sheldon can visit his mother later. On the flight, both are frightened by clear-air turbulence and each admits respecting the other as a friend without whom life would be empty. Raj asks Amy to contact to Emily, who he saw on his dating website. Raj thus appears too passive, turning her off. She and Amy have much in common and enjoy tea together until Raj shows up uninvited and interrupts them, putting off Emily and ruining any chance of friendship with either.
153	18	"The Mommy Observation"	Mark Cendrowski	Story by : Jim Reynolds & Steve Holland & Maria Ferrari; Teleplay by : Steven Molaro & Eric Kaplan & Anthony Del Broccolo	March 13, 2014	4X5319	17.34
Sheldon and Howard drop in on Sheldon's mother Mary to surprise her, but flee after Sheldon sees her through the window having sex. Sheldon returns, gets into an argument, and is sent to his room. After Howard tells him he once drove away an admirer of his mother, Sheldon apologizes to Mary, saying he will outwardly accept her choice while inwardly condemning her hypocrisy in going against her religious beliefs. She forgives him and commends his good Christian attitude. The rest of the gang is roped into a murder mystery dinner arranged by Raj, with Stuart as the corpse. "Traveling" to the future envisioned by Raj, Leonard and Penny broke up because of their successful careers. The pair argue what they would do if one were required to abandon a dream for the other's success. Stuart believes that Leonard and Penny will end up together and says they are the best couple he knows. He reasons that Penny made Leonard more confident while Leonard made Penny think more deeply about the world. Penny is touched and accidentally reveals being the murderer, ruining Raj's game. Leonard suggests that whatever happens, they all meet in front of the apartment in 20 years for dinner. When the time finally comes, only Stuart shows up.
154	19	"The Indecision Amalgamation"	Anthony Rich	Story by : Bill Prady & Eric Kaplan & Jim Reynolds; Teleplay by : Steven Molaro & Dave Goetsch & Steve Holland	April 3, 2014	4X5320	17.73
Decision time: Raj must decide whether to date both Emily and Lucy after he runs into Emily, who decides to give him another chance, and receives an email from Lucy, who says she misses him; Penny must decide whether to accept her role in a horrible horror movie, Serial Ape-ist 2, after she receives another unconditional offer to reprise it; and Sheldon is torn between buying a PlayStation 4 or an Xbox One after discovering he only has room for one more console in his entertainment center. Sheldon's decision ramblings annoy Amy during their dinner date where she fakes exaggerated interest, then pondering his choices for hours at Best Buy. Leonard and Penny seek career advice from Wil Wheaton, who remembers his career rejections and hardships in the acting industry and ends up being depressed. After accepting the job, Penny discovers Wil is the bikini-clad orangutan she must wrestle in the film. Emily tells Raj she does not mind him dating someone else, so he keeps seeing her. Meanwhile, after signing a card for a retiring co-worker, Bernadette discovers her message is highly inappropriate as the card is actually a "get well" card for the woman, who has been in a terrible accident.
155	20	"The Relationship Diremption"	Mark Cendrowski	Story by : Steven Molaro & Bill Prady & Jim Reynolds; Teleplay by : Chuck Lorre & Eric Kaplan & Steve Holland	April 10, 2014	4X5321	16.49
After Raj is rebuffed by Lucy for dating another woman, he and Emily double-date with Howard and Bernadette so they can meet her before he scares her off. At first, Raj is afraid Howard will joke about his shortcomings; however, Howard becomes the butt of all the jokes: He had a blind date with Emily years before, and due to a stomach problem, he severely clogged her toilet and ran out on her. Recent big bang theory discoveries lead Sheldon to believe he wasted his life trying to prove string theory. On Penny's advice, he decides to get rid of all his string theory books and move to a new field. While Sheldon expresses frustration at all his possible choices, including geology, which he believes is not real science, Leonard and Penny tell him not to rush it. Eventually, Amy puts a drunk Sheldon to bed. When he awakes, he is horrified to see what he holds in his arms: a geology book. While calling Amy to apologize for scaring her off, he also discovers he made several drunk calls to Stephen Hawking's answering machine. Sheldon and Howard later console each other over their respective problems.
156	21	"The Anything Can Happen Recurrence"	Mark Cendrowski	Story by : Steven Molaro & Eric Kaplan & Adam Faberman; Teleplay by : Jim Reynolds & Steve Holland & Tara Hernandez	April 24, 2014	4X5322	16.44
After reinstating "Anything Can Happen Thursday", Sheldon, Leonard and Penny wander around town looking for a new restaurant or things to do. They find Amy and Bernadette having dinner after lying to their friends. They were tired of hearing Sheldon moan about searching for a new research field and hearing Penny complain about her horrible movie. Leonard sympathizes, so Sheldon and Penny storm off. Bernadette admits lying to Howard too, and Penny calls Howard to inform him, but Bernadette says she will just put on a Catholic schoolgirl uniform to make it up to him. Amy tells Leonard she is jealous of how comfortable Sheldon is with Penny. After dinner, Penny drags Sheldon to a psychic who says all his problems will be solved if he commits more to his lady friend - Amy. A rattled Sheldon denounces it as "malarkey" and storms out of the psychic's office, leaving Penny stunned. Raj and Howard watch a horror film, which both find disturbing, to prepare Raj for watching it with Emily. Emily later says she, too, finds the film disturbing, but Raj watches it with her after she says it also turns her on.
157	22	"The Proton Transmogrification"	Mark Cendrowski	Story by : Jim Reynolds & Maria Ferrari & Jeremy Howe; Teleplay by : Steven Molaro & Eric Kaplan & Steve Holland	May 1, 2014	4X5317	16.07
The guys prepare for Star Wars Day and plan to watch all six films. Leonard tells Sheldon that Arthur Jeffries (Professor Proton), their childhood hero, has died. Sheldon claims he is fine and prepares to start the film marathon with Raj and Howard; meanwhile Bernadette and Amy make a Death Star cake for the guys while talking about why they became scientists. Penny and Leonard attend Arthur's funeral on the same day and start discussing their regrets in life; he regrets not having accepted her marriage proposal. Leonard is more upset about her turning his two proposals down than him turning her down once. Penny proposes to make him feel better (and to even out the score). He chooses to tease her in hesitating to answer, frustrating her. While Sheldon is sleeping through the film marathon, Arthur appears to him in a dream dressed as a Jedi Master. He knows neither why he is there nor what advice to give Sheldon, but once Sheldon confides that all his male idols in his family died, he tells him to cherish the people around him in the present. After Leonard returns home, Sheldon wakes up and hugs him, taking Arthur's advice.
158	23	"The Gorilla Dissolution"	Peter Chakos	Story by : Chuck Lorre & Jim Reynolds & Jeremy Howe; Teleplay by : Steven Molaro & Steve Holland & Eric Kaplan	May 8, 2014	4X5323	14.42
Howard, Bernadette, and Raj move a treadmill up to Howard's old room at his mother's house as her doctor says she needs more exercise. The treadmill slides back down the stairs, breaking Howard's mother's leg. The couple later struggle to care for her, as if for a newborn baby, but finally hire a live-in nurse. Leonard visits the movie set of Serial Ape-ist 2 where Penny contradicts the director on repeating a take. He insults Penny and fires her. Wil takes her side and gets fired too. They and Leonard commiserate at a bar until Wil is called to audition for Sharknado 2. At home, Penny tells Leonard she must make better life decisions and suggests they marry. He wants assurance that this is not just because she was fired and feels sorry for herself. Penny says that getting fired from the movie is the best thing that happened to her and she realized in order to be happy she needs only Leonard, not fame. Taking out a ring from his wallet, he formally proposes and she happily accepts. At the movies, Sheldon and Raj run into Emily dating another man. As they discuss why women do not like Raj, Sheldon advises Raj to overcome his fear of being alone. Emily later explains to Raj that the other guy did her last tattoo and asked her out for months; she gave in to get the date over with. She invites Raj to inspect her three tattoos "on my shoulder; not on my shoulder; definitely not on my shoulder" and spends the night with him.
159	24	"The Status Quo Combustion"	Mark Cendrowski	Story by : Eric Kaplan & Jim Reynolds & Jeremy Howe; Teleplay by : Steven Molaro & Steve Holland & Tara Hernandez	May 15, 2014	4X5324	16.73
Leonard and Penny tell the group they are engaged; all are happy but make a bigger deal of Raj and Emily having had sex. Leonard's mother is unmoved by his engagement, but accepts Penny because Sheldon is very fond of her. Sheldon is angered the university will not let him change research fields and considers quitting. He is further upset that Leonard and Penny do not want to live with him when married. He is disturbed at Amy's suggestion they could live together, and his last nerve breaks on discovering Stuart's comic book store was destroyed by a fire. Sheldon decides to leave town to figure out what he wants. Leonard tracks him down at the train station to convince him to come home with them but Penny says they should let him go. Sheldon calls Amy to say he is all right, after which a distraught Amy attacks Leonard with a pillow for letting him go. Howard's mother drives away all nurses hired to look after her, even Penny. Howard offers Stuart the job, giving him money and a home while he gets back on his feet after losing his store. He loves the job, becoming surprisingly close to Howard's mother.

== Ratings ==
Viewership and ratings per episode of The Big Bang Theory season 7
No.	Title	Air date	Rating/share (18–49)	Viewers (millions)	DVR (18–49)	DVR viewers (millions)	Total (18–49)	Total viewers (millions)
1	"The Hofstadter Insufficiency"	September 26, 2013	5.5/18	18.99	2.3	5.15	7.8	24.16
2	"The Deception Verification"	September 26, 2013	6.1/18	20.44	2.5	5.70	8.6	26.14
3	"The Scavenger Vortex"	October 3, 2013	5.2/17	18.22	2.4	5.48	7.6	23.70
4	"The Raiders Minimization"	October 10, 2013	5.1/17	17.64	2.6	5.59	7.7	23.23
5	"The Workplace Proximity"	October 17, 2013	5.2/17	17.80	2.3	5.10	7.5	22.90
6	"The Romance Resonance"	October 24, 2013	5.2/16	16.98	2.7	5.99	7.9	22.97
7	"The Proton Displacement"	November 7, 2013	4.9/15	16.89	2.6	5.59	7.5	22.48
8	"The Itchy Brain Simulation"	November 14, 2013	5.2/17	18.30	2.4	5.04	7.6	23.34
9	"The Thanksgiving Decoupling"	November 21, 2013	5.3/16	18.94	2.6	6.01	7.9	24.95
10	"The Discovery Dissipation"	December 5, 2013	4.8/14	15.63	2.3	5.18	7.1	20.81
11	"The Cooper Extraction"	December 12, 2013	5.1/16	17.68	2.5	5.76	7.6	23.44
12	"The Hesitation Ramification"	January 2, 2014	5.4/15	19.20	2.5	5.55	7.9	24.75
13	"The Occupation Recalibration"	January 9, 2014	5.7/17	20.35	2.3	4.93	8.0	25.28
14	"The Convention Conundrum"	January 30, 2014	5.2/15	19.05	2.5	5.70	7.7	24.75
15	"The Locomotive Manipulation"	February 6, 2014	5.2/15	17.53	2.8	6.49	8.0	24.02
16	"The Table Polarization"	February 27, 2014	5.0/16	17.73	2.7	5.66	7.7	23.39
17	"The Friendship Turbulence"	March 6, 2014	5.3/17	18.09	2.6	5.69	7.9	23.78
18	"The Mommy Observation"	March 13, 2014	4.9/17	17.34	2.6	5.56	7.5	22.95
19	"The Indecision Amalgamation"	April 3, 2014	4.9/18	17.73	2.3	5.31	7.2	22.86
20	"The Relationship Diremption"	April 10, 2014	4.7/17	16.49	2.5	5.36	7.2	21.65
21	"The Anything Can Happen Recurrence"	April 24, 2014	4.5/16	16.44	2.1	5.12	6.6	21.56
22	"The Proton Transmogrification"	May 1, 2014	4.5/16	16.07	4.5	7.00	9.0	23.07
23	"The Gorilla Dissolution"	May 8, 2014	3.8/13	14.42	3.8	6.40	7.6	20.82
24	"The Status Quo Combustion"	May 15, 2014	4.9/18	16.73	4.9	7.40	9.8	24.13

== Reception ==
The season premiere received positive reviews . Oliver Sava of The A.V. Club criticized some of the humor, particularly stereotypes written for the female characters, although noting that "these actors make it very funny", but praised the series on a whole; "the major strides made with Sheldon, Penny, and Leonard compensate for some of the more distasteful humor, making this a strong start for this show's seventh season". Carla Day of TV Fanatic wrote that "There were definitely some funny moments, but in its entirety it wasn't one of my favorites". Euan Ferguson of The Guardian wrote that "The Big Bang Theory is now pretty well established ... And just gets ever better".
