= The Hofstadter Insufficiency =

- The Big Bang Theory episode
- Episode no.: Season 7 Episode 1
- Directed by: Mark Cendrowski
- Story by: Eric Kaplan; Jim Reynolds; Steve Holland
- Teleplay by: Chuck Lorre; Steven Molaro; Tara Hernandez
- Production code: 4X5301
- Original air date: September 26, 2013
- Running time: 21 minutes

Episode chronology
← Previous "The Bon Voyage Reaction"	Next → "The Deception Verification"
- The Big Bang Theory (season 7)

"The Hofstadter Insufficiency" is the first episode of the seventh season of The Big Bang Theory and the 136th episode in total. It aired on September 26, 2013, on CBS.

== Plot ==
Sheldon calls Leonard on his ship in the North Sea about a major emergency situation concerning their DVDs. Suddenly, Leonard is taken by a kraken. Sheldon wakes up screaming, realizing it was just a nightmare. He runs to Penny's apartment, where she agrees to let him sleep in her apartment, and he takes her bed. Later, Penny is missing Leonard, so is not interested in the 3-D chess game that Sheldon is teaching her. Penny calls Leonard, who is partying on his boat and not available to talk. Penny is upset that Leonard is having fun while she is missing him, so Sheldon tries to comfort her. They agree to share one "vulnerable" secret each. Penny shares that she once did a topless scene in an unreleased slasher horror movie about a killer gorilla called Serial Ape-ist. Sheldon tells her that he saw the movie online; Howard had found it shortly after she moved in. Sheldon shares his secret: he does not like the new YouTube rating system. Penny feels duped as while her secret makes her feel vulnerable, Sheldon's secret is the opposite. This hurts Sheldon's feelings, as she does not see the vulnerability of his secret. Penny apologizes and they share a rare hug.

Raj is heartbroken about losing his relationship with Lucy and sees her image everywhere, including in grease stains and in his chicken pot pie. Howard invites Raj to a work social to meet women and try to move on. Raj is not engaged and decides to leave, and as he is departing he runs into Janine Davis, whose husband has left her for an undergraduate student. Their conversation is awkward yet mostly friendly, as they open up about common themes in their respective romantic relationships. Raj thinks that they had a moment together, but decides not to do anything about it.

While Amy and Bernadette are attending a conference, Amy gets excited when two men buy them drinks at the hotel bar. Later, after Bernadette brushes the guys off as they are spoken for, she comments to Amy that no one would blame her for accepting the invitation, since her boyfriend is "kind of Sheldon". Amy is offended and retaliates by saying Bernadette's husband is "extremely Howard". At bedtime, neither is talking to the other. They try to engage by talking about how great it was to be found attractive. Amy was drawn to the short guy with the weird haircut, while Bernadette liked the tall, inexperienced one. When it dawns on them that they feel attracted to traits of each other's partner, they quickly say goodnight.

At the end of the episode, Leonard boasts to his shipmates about Penny being his girlfriend, showing them her topless scene.

== Reception ==
=== Ratings ===
"The Hofstadter Insufficiency" written by Jay Murray originally aired on CBS on September 26, 2013. The episode was watched by 18.99 million viewers in the U.S. and received a Nielsen rating of 5.5/18 among adults between 18 and 49. In addition, 5.15 million viewers watched on DVR, giving the episode a total of 24.16 million viewers. It was top in its time slot, ahead of FOX's The X Factor, NBC's Parks and Recreation, ABC's Agents of S.H.I.E.L.D., and The CW's The Vampire Diaries. The Big Bang Theory was also the highest-rated show of the night.

In Canada, the episode also aired on September 26, 2013. It received a weekly ranking of 2, as it was watched by 4.31 million viewers.

The episode aired on October 31, 2013 in the UK and was watched by 2.32 million viewers on E4 (according to BARB), making it the top watched program on E4 that week. It was watched by 0.41 million viewers on E4 +1, so it was watched by a total of 2.73 million people.

=== Critical reviews ===
Oliver Sara from The A.V. Club gave the episode a B+.

Jesse Schedeen from IGN gave the episode an 8/10 and called this episode a "solid look at life without Leonard". Schedeen praised the episode for "the characters divided into some fun, nontraditional pairs" and "moments of growth for Raj, Sheldon, and Penny". However, he also said there were "too many shades of early season 6 right now" and wondering if the series still needs Leonard.
