= The Fighting Fitzgeralds =

American sitcom television series

- Genre: Sitcom
- Created by: Brian Burns; Edward Burns
- Developed by: Phoef Sutton
- Starring: Brian Dennehy; Justin Louis; Connie Britton; Abigail Mavity; Christopher Moynihan; Jon Patrick Walker
- Composers: Jonathan Wolff; Rich Ragsdale
- Country of origin: United States
- Original language: English
- No. of seasons: 1
- No. of episodes: 10 (list of episodes)

Production
- Executive producers: Phoef Sutton; Edward Burns; Brian Burns; James Widdoes; Mark Legan; Brian Dennehy
- Producer: Faye Oshima Belyeu
- Camera setup: Multi-camera
- Running time: 30 minutes
- Production companies: Artists Television Group; Irish Twins Productions; Mauretania Productions; NBC Studios

Original release
- Network: NBC
- Release: March 6 – May 15, 2001

The Fighting Fitzgeralds is an American sitcom television series that aired on NBC from March 6 until May 15, 2001. It was created by filmmaker Edward Burns and his brother Brian.

== Premise ==
"Fitz", a widower and former firefighter, wants to enjoy his retirement but shares his home with three grown sons, a daughter-in-law and a granddaughter.

== Cast ==
- Brian Dennehy as Mr. Fitzgerald
- Justin Louis as Jim Fitzgerald
- Connie Britton as Sophie Fitzgerald
- Abigail Mavity as Marie Fitzgerald
- Christopher Moynihan as Terry Fitzgerald
- Jon Patrick Walker as Patrick Fitzgerald

== Episodes ==
No.	Title	Directed by	Written by	Original release date	Prod. code	Viewers (millions)
1	"Pilot"	James Widdoes	Brian Burns, Edward Burns and Phoef Sutton	March 6, 2001	56–01000	13.57
Fitz' youngest son quits his job as a stockbroker and moves back home.
2	"The Fire Fight"	James Widdoes	Will Gluck	March 13, 2001	56–01001	8.09
Patrick wants to be a firefighter. Fitzgerald decides to take an art class.
3	"When Irish Eyes Are Smilin'"	James Widdoes	Mark Legan	March 20, 2001	56–01002	9.86
Fitzgerald has the attention of two widows.
4	"The Heartbeat"	James Widdoes	Phoef Sutton and Mark Legan	March 27, 2001	56–01003	9.82
Fitzgerald is upset because one of the stores in the neighborhood is closing. Terry decides to buy a shirt.
5	"I'm Okay, You're Crazy"	Barnet Kellman	Gina Gold, Phoef Sutton and Mark Legan	April 3, 2001	56–01004	8.56
Fitzgerald agrees to go to a psychiatrist. Terry befriends a dog owned by a neighbor.
6	"The Easter Rebellion"	Peter Bonerz	Phoef Sutton	April 10, 2001	56–01005	6.68
Patrick moves in with Terry. Fitzgerald brings an Easter basket to Marie's class.
7	"The Loud Man"	Barnet Kellman	Marc Flanagan	April 17, 2001	56–01006	8.74
Fitzgerald invests in an Irish-themed restaurant. Jim asks Terry and Sophie to play on his softball team.
8	"One Angry Man (a.k.a. The Angry Man)"	Gail Mancuso	Janet Leahy	May 1, 2001	56–01007	5.29
An incident involving Fitzgerald and a neighbor's dog lands in court.
9	"The Cook, the Fitz, His Sister and Her Luggage"	James Widdoes	Phoef Sutton and Mark Legan	May 8, 2001	56–01008	6.30
Fitzgerald's older sister comes for a visit. Patrick takes a job at the local tavern.
10	"Blood, Sweat and Fitz"	James Widdoes	Miriam Trogdon	May 15, 2001	56–01009	6.23
Fitzgerald promises to speak at a retirement dinner.
