= Mike Massimino =

American astronaut and engineer (born 1962)

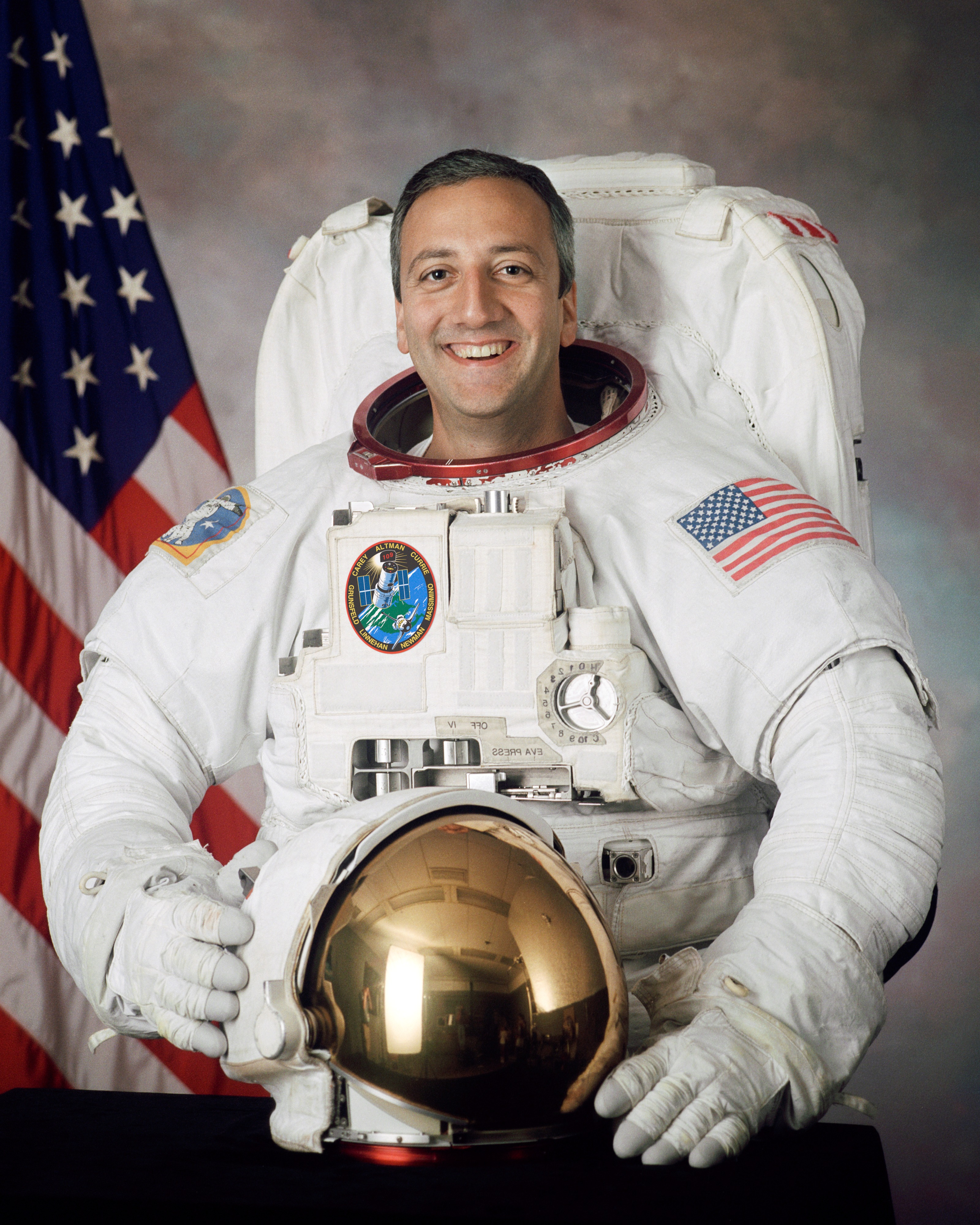
- Massimino in 2001
- Born: Michael James Massimino; August 19, 1962 (age 64); Oceanside, New York, U.S.
- Education: Columbia University (BS); Massachusetts Institute of Technology (MS, Eng, PhD)
- Space career

NASA astronaut
- Time in space: 23d 19h 47m
- Selection: NASA Group 16 (1996)
- Total EVAs: 4
- Total EVA time: 30h, 32m
- Mission: STS-109; STS-125
- Mission insignia
- Scientific career
- Fields: Mechanical engineering
- Thesis: Sensory Substitution for Force Feedback in Space Teleoperation (1992)
- Doctoral advisor: Thomas B. Sheridan
- Website: Official website

Michael James Massimino (born August 19, 1962) is an American professor of mechanical engineering at Columbia University and a former NASA astronaut. He is the senior advisor of space programs at the Intrepid Sea, Air & Space Museum.

== Early life ==
Massimino was born August 19, 1962, in Oceanside, New York, and raised in Franklin Square, New York, both on Long Island. He graduated from H. Frank Carey Junior-Senior High School in Franklin Square, New York in 1980. He went on to attend Columbia University, graduating with a Bachelor of Science degree in industrial engineering in 1984. He then attended the Massachusetts Institute of Technology (MIT), graduating with a Master of Science degree in mechanical engineering and a Master of Science degree in technology and public policy in 1988. There he conducted research on human operator control of space robotics systems in the MIT Mechanical Engineering Department's human–machine systems Laboratory. His work resulted in the awarding of two patents. While a student at MIT he worked during the summer of 1987 as a general engineer at NASA Headquarters in the Office of Aeronautics and Space Technology.

He continued his education at MIT, earning a Degree of Mechanical Engineer in 1990 and a Doctor of Philosophy degree in mechanical engineering in 1992.

== Career ==
Upon completing his B.S. degree from Columbia, Massimino worked for IBM as a systems engineer in New York City from 1984 until 1986.

During the summers of 1988 and 1989 as a research fellow in the Man-Systems Integration Branch at the NASA Marshall Space Flight Center, and during the summer of 1990 as a visiting research engineer at the German Aerospace Center (DLR) in Oberpfaffenhofen, Germany.

Massimino worked at McDonnell Douglas Aerospace in Houston, Texas as a research engineer where he developed laptop computer displays to assist operators of the Space Shuttle remote manipulator system. These displays included the Manipulator Position Display, which was evaluated on STS-69. From 1992 to 1994 he was also an adjunct assistant professor in the Mechanical Engineering & Material Sciences Department at Rice University, where he taught feedback control of mechanical systems. In September 1995, Massimino joined the faculty of the Georgia Institute of Technology as an assistant professor in the School of Industrial and Systems Engineering. At Georgia Tech he taught human-machine systems engineering classes and conducted research on human-machine interfaces for space and aircraft systems in the Center for Human-Machine Systems Research. He has published papers in technical journals and in the proceedings of technical conferences.

=== NASA career ===
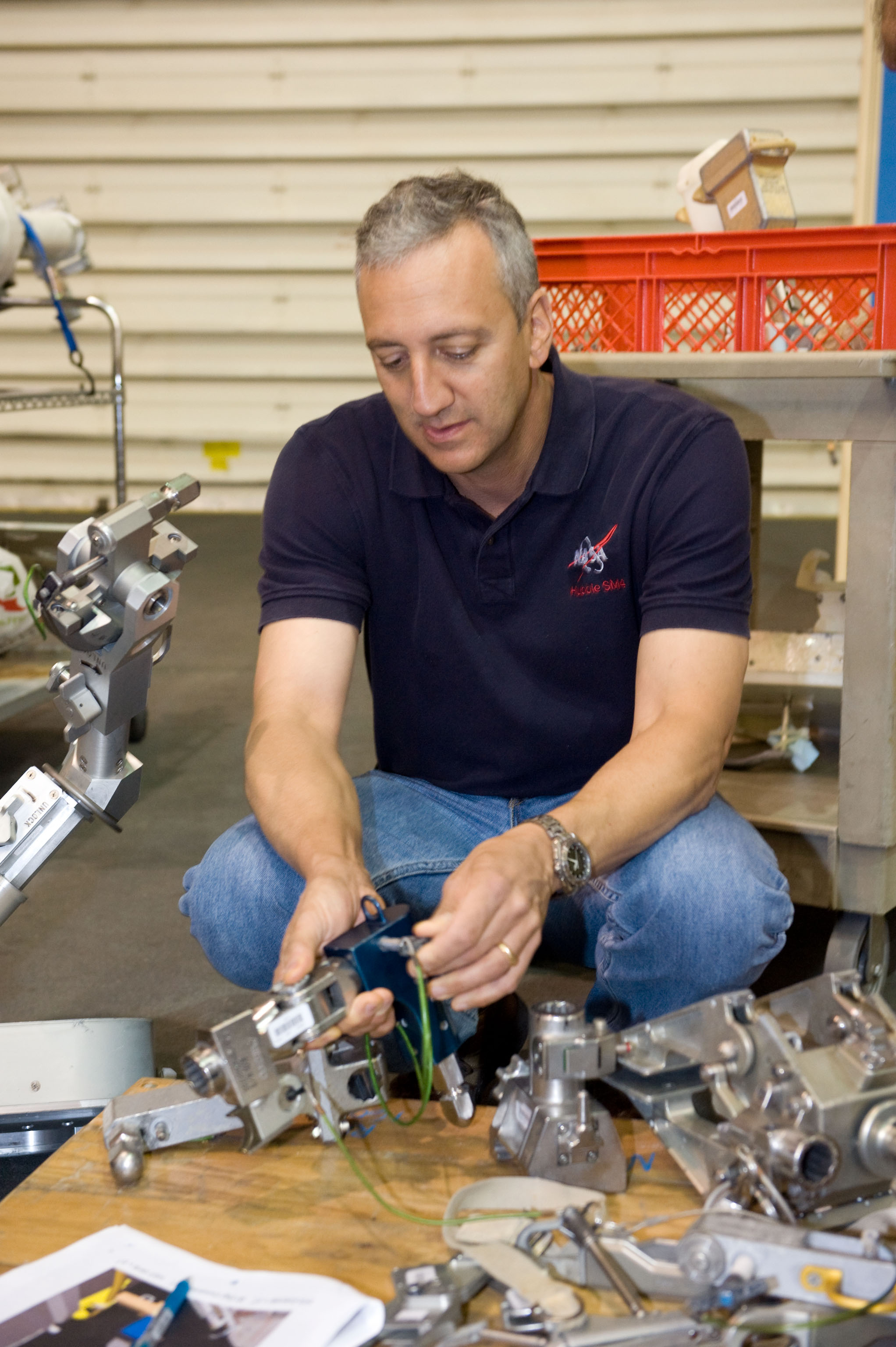
Massimino works with EVA hardware while training for STS-125

Selected as an astronaut candidate by NASA in May 1996, Massimino reported to the Johnson Space Center in August 1996. He completed two years of initial training and evaluation and qualified for flight assignment as a mission specialist. Prior to his first space flight assignment, Massimino served in the Astronaut Office Robotics Branch, and in the Astronaut Office Extravehicular Activity (EVA) Branch. He has served as a CAPCOM (spacecraft communicator) in Mission Control and performed other technical tasks in the Astronaut Office CAPCOM Branch.

On July 29, 2014, Massimino announced that he would be leaving NASA to pursue a teaching career at Columbia University, in New York City.

==== Spaceflight experience ====
STS-109 Columbia (March 1–12, 2002). STS-109 was the fourth Hubble Space Telescope (HST) servicing mission. The crew of STS-109 successfully upgraded the Hubble Space Telescope, leaving it with a new power unit, a new camera (the Advanced Camera for Surveys), and new solar arrays. STS-109 set a record for spacewalk time with 35 hours and 55 minutes during 5 spacewalks. Massimino performed two spacewalks totaling 14 hours and 46 minutes. STS-109 orbited the Earth 165 times, and covered 4.5 million statute miles in over 262 hours and 10 minutes.

STS-125 Atlantis (May 11–24, 2009) was the final Hubble servicing mission by the Space Shuttle. Atlantis landed in California after stormy weather prevented the shuttle from landing at NASA's home base in Florida as previously planned. During the mission Massimino became the first person to use Twitter in space, writing, "From orbit: Launch was awesome!! I am feeling great, working hard, & enjoying the magnificent views, the adventure of a lifetime has begun!"

=== Post-NASA career ===
At Columbia University, Massimino is a Professor of Professional Practice in the Department of Mechanical Engineering at the Fu Foundation School of Engineering and Applied Science.

He teaches an undergraduate engineering course, Introduction to Human Space Flight, which harnesses his years of academic and professional experience. He is also collaborating on The Art of Engineering, a course in which all first-year engineers work on engineering projects with socially responsible themes.

Massimino's 2016 book, Spaceman: An Astronaut's Unlikely Journey to Unlock the Secrets of the Universe, is a New York Times best-seller.

The street that Massimino grew up on in Franklin Square, Long Island has been renamed "Mike Massimino Street".

September 17, 2022, Massimino was the grand marshal for the New York City Feast of San Gennaro.

== In media ==
Massimino is a frequent guest on television news and talk show programs, including NBC's Today Show, ABC's Good Morning America, CNN, and Fox News. He has also appeared on the Late Show with David Letterman and The Late Late Show with Craig Ferguson.

In the PBS children's program Sid the Science Kid, Massimino appeared as himself in an episode focused on scientists.

Beginning in 2012, Massimino appeared as himself in a recurring role on the CBS TV sitcom The Big Bang Theory launching aboard a Russian Soyuz to the International Space Station. He appeared in another episode advising Howard Wolowitz not to throw out the opening pitch at a baseball game. His screen credit reads "Mike Massimino, NASA Astronaut".

He is a frequent guest on Neil deGrasse Tyson's podcast StarTalk, and has also appeared on the TV version.

Massimino performed twice at a storytelling event of The Moth on November 14, 2012, he talked about the high stakes in the repair of the Hubble Space Telescope in A View of the Earth and on February 21, 2017, he talked about the swimming test at the beginning of his astronaut training in Swimming with Astronauts.

Massimino makes a brief appearance at a Shuttle launch in Chapter XXIX of the 2012 novel A Hologram for the King, in which he discusses his experience in space.

Massimino was a guest in episode 414 of The Nerdist Podcast.

After the October 4, 2013, release of the film Gravity with Sandra Bullock, Massimino commented on the scientific reliability of the movie. It was also suggested that the role played by George Clooney was partially based on Massimino's spacewalk performance.

Massimino's book Spaceman: An Astronaut's Unlikely Journey to Unlock the Secrets of the Universe was published by Crown Archetype on October 4, 2016 The Audible e-book version is narrated by Massimino himself.

In 2017, Massimino hosted Science Channel's live coverage of the total solar eclipse of August 21, dubbed the "Great American Eclipse."

Soon after, he became host of Science's The Planets, an in-depth look at the planets of the Solar System as well as dwarf planets and exoplanets. The series was renewed for a second season, which began airing in 2018 under the new title The Planets and Beyond. He also hosted an online companion series, Ask the Astronaut, in which he talked about his personal experiences of spaceflight.

In 2019, Massimino hosted a YouTube series for Wired where he discusses the differences between life on Earth and in space, discussing topics like Food, Sleep, and Hygiene.

Massimino voiced the NASA launch control official in the 2022 animated comedy Beavis and Butt-Head Do the Universe.

In 2024, Massimino was a guest speaker on the podcast Finding Mastery, called an astronaut's guide to achieving the impossible.

== Organizations ==
- The Explorers Club

== Awards and honors ==
- NASA Space Flight Medals
- NASA Graduate Student Researchers Program Fellowship
- Order Sons of Italy in America 2005 Guglielmo Marconi Award
- Christopher Award
- Columbia University Community Impact Outstanding Community Service Award
- Communications Award of the National Space Club

== Personal life ==
Massimino is married to Jessica Marinaccio. He has two children from a previous marriage.

== Filmography ==
Year	Title	Role	Notes
2010	Hubble	Himself	An IMAX 3D movie directed by Toni Myers and narrated by Leonardo DiCaprio, showing views of the galaxy and a report of several space-walks that were performed to install and maintain the Hubble Space Telescope.
2010	SXSW Flashback 2010	Himself	Documentary of the 2010 South by Southwest music festival, an annual conglomerate of film, interactive media, and music festivals and conferences taking place in Austin, Texas. The 2010 iteration ran from March 12 to 21.
2011	Sid the Science Kid	Himself	"I Want to Be a Scientist!" (episode 57)
2011–14	The Big Bang Theory	Himself	"The Friendship Contraction" "The Countdown Reflection" "The Decoupling Fluctuation" "The Re-Entry Minimization" "The Table Polarization" "The First Pitch Insufficiency"
2015–16	StarTalk	Himself	"Chris Hadfield" (episode 7) "Bas Lansdorp" (Mars One) (episode 17) "Buzz Aldrin" (episode 30)
2017–2018	The Planets and Beyond	Himself	Host of the Science Channel series, and companion web series Ask the Astronaut
2018	One Strange Rock	Himself	Featured in the National Geographic Channel's series
2022	Beavis and Butt-Head Do the Universe	NASA Launch Control	Voice cameo
2024	Space Cadet	Himself	

== Books ==
- Spaceman: An Astronaut's Unlikely Journey to Unlock the Secrets of the Universe (2016)
- Moonshot: A NASA Astronaut's Guide to Achieving the Impossible (2023)
