= The Convention Conundrum =

- The Big Bang Theory episode
- Episode no.: Season 7 Episode 14
- Directed by: Mark Cendrowski
- Story by: Eric Kaplan; Jim Reynolds; Adam Faberman
- Teleplay by: Steven Molaro; Dave Goetsch; Steve Holland
- Production code: 4X5315
- Original air date: January 30, 2014
- Running time: 21 minutes

Guest appearances
- James Earl Jones as himself; Carrie Fisher as herself

Episode chronology
| ← Previous "The Occupation Recalibration" | Next → "The Locomotive Manipulation" |
- The Big Bang Theory season 7

"The Convention Conundrum" is the 14th episode of the seventh season of the U.S. sitcom The Big Bang Theory and the 149th episode of the show overall. It first aired on CBS on January 30, 2014.

The episode was filmed nine days before airing. It features guest appearances by James Earl Jones and Carrie Fisher. In contrast to previous guest stars, Jones takes a liking to Sheldon (Jim Parsons) and the main plot is focused on the two having a night out together. Fisher appears when Jones suggests they knock on her door and run away. The episode received high ratings and mainly positive reviews, with many complimenting the cameo appearances.

== Plot ==
Leonard, Sheldon, Raj and Howard are in Leonard and Sheldon's apartment, waiting for Comic-Con tickets to go on sale online. After ten minutes of trying, tickets run out and the four men are disappointed that they will not be able to attend, especially as they had spent so much time on their costumes, intending to go as different versions of the Hulk as portrayed by Lou Ferrigno, Eric Bana, Edward Norton, and Mark Ruffalo.

Sheldon decides to set up his own convention called Sheldon-Con and tries to convince several celebrities to appear like Zachary Quinto, Patrick Stewart, William Shatner, Harrison Ford, George Lucas, Mark Hamill, Matt Smith, Billy Dee Williams, Simon Pegg, Jon Favreau, Ian McKellen, Stan Lee, Andy Serkis, Martin Freeman, Wil Wheaton, Robert Downey Jr., Leonard Nimoy, Bill Nye, Carrie Fisher, Adam West, "Anyone Who Played Uncle Ben", and "Anyone Who Shot Uncle Ben". Since Wil is unavailable since he has to wash his beard, Downey Jr.'s agent said no and hung up on Sheldon, and Quinto, Stewart, Shatner, Ford, Hamill, Williams, Favreau, McKellen, Serkis, Freeman, and West declined because of the slash marks through their names on Sheldon's whiteboard, Sheldon asks Leonard to contact Nimoy, Lee, and Nye as he is not legally allowed to (Note: Sheldon's restraining orders from Leonard Nimoy and Stan Lee were mentioned and featured respectively in "The Excelsior Acquisition". Sheldon's restraining order from Bill Nye occurred in "The Proton Displacement".) and to also contact Fisher since she could be somewhat nuts. Leonard, Raj, and Howard attempt to solve their Comic-Con problem by illegally buying scalped tickets. After arranging for a scalper to come to the apartment, they begin to get worried, remembering Sheldon's warning that they could get charged for petty theft, then have to disclose the crime in the future. When the scalper is heard arriving, they quickly turn off the lights and stay silent.

Sheldon discovers James Earl Jones, whom he reveres for voicing the Star Wars villain Darth Vader, is going to a sushi restaurant, where Sheldon meets him. Unlike many celebrities Sheldon has met, Jones eagerly welcomes his company. Sheldon asks Jones questions about himself and he confirms that he was functionally mute for eight years, he was a pre-med in college, and that sound designer Ben Burtt used scuba equipment to create the sound of Darth Vader's breathing. The two spend the night doing various activities at an ice-cream parlor, a carnival, a strip club, singing at a karaoke club, pranking Carrie Fisher by knocking on her door and running away, and finish the night by going to a sauna. When Jones learns that Sheldon and his friends failed to get Comic-Con tickets, he invites them along as his guests.

Penny, Amy and Bernadette go for afternoon tea at a tea parlor in an attempt to feel more like adults. Once they arrive, they see that only mothers and their children are there; they decide to hit the lobby bar instead. They discuss how they do not feel grown up and how being an adult is not necessarily a good thing.

== Production ==
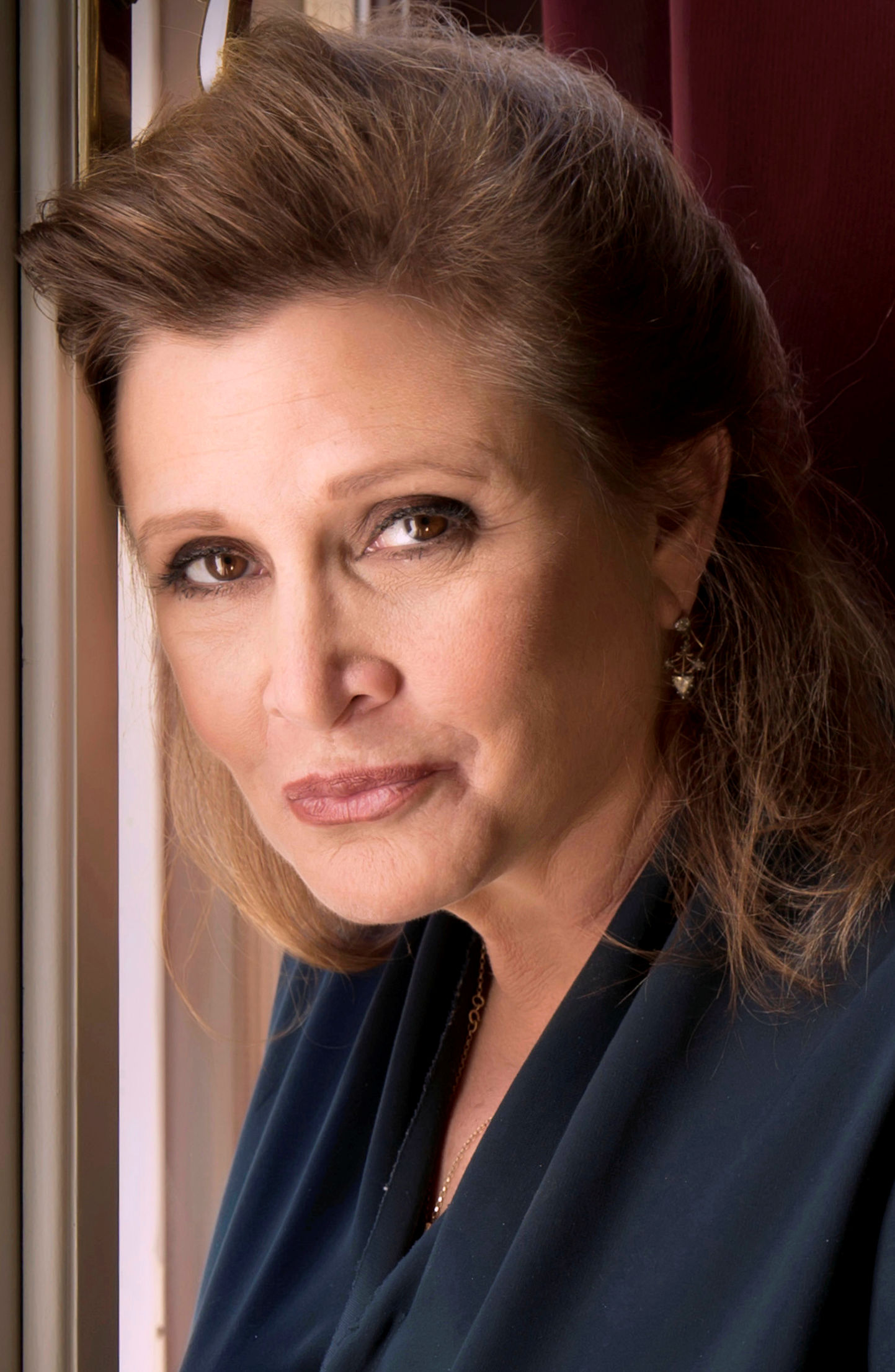
Carrie Fisher, who played Princess Leia in the Star Wars franchise, makes a guest appearance in "The Convention Conundrum"

The episode features guest stars James Earl Jones and Carrie Fisher, actors from the Star Wars film series. It was first announced that they would be appearing on the show on January 12, 2014. The day after, Steve Molaro revealed the basic plot outline for the episode, although he refused to explain exactly what Fisher's "very small, very funny, very weird part" would be. Harrison Ford was offered a guest appearance in the episode, but turned it down as he wasn't open to it. The episode was filmed on January 21, 2014. (Note: The episode, per the production code, was the 15th to be filmed in the season. "1/21/14" was the 15th date listed on TVTickets for season 7 of The Big Bang Theory.) In real life, James Earl Jones is said to be a "good sport" when meeting Star Wars fans, similar to his character in the episode. Jim Parsons described having James Earl Jones around as "pretty insane" and said "there's no way ever you can even realize the amount of work he's done."

"The Convention Conundrum" is the first episode to credit Kaley Cuoco, who plays Penny, as Kaley Cuoco-Sweeting. (Note: She was credited as "Kaley Cuoco" in "The Occupation Recalibration" (the previous episode) and credited as "Kaley Cuoco-Sweeting" in "The Convention Conundrum" (this episode).) She married Ryan Sweeting on December 31, 2013; this was the third episode to air after their wedding. (Note: "The Hesitation Ramification" aired on January 2, 2014, and "The Occupation Recalibration" aired on January 9, 2014.)

== Reception ==
=== Ratings ===
On the night of its first broadcast on January 30, 2014, at 8 p.m., the episode was watched by 19.05 million households in the U.S. Including 5.70 million viewers watching on DVR, the episode was watched by 24.75 million viewers in total. It received a Nielsen rating of 11.3/14 overall, and 5.2/15 for viewers aged 18 to 49. The episode was the most watched episode that night.

In Canada, the episode aired at the same time as in America, on CTV Television Network and was watched by 4.38 million viewers, ranking it third on both Canadian television and CTV that week. Australia first broadcast the episode on Nine Network on March 25, 2014, and was watched by 994,000 households. It was ranked third on the network that night and eighth on cable. In the UK, it aired on May 1, 2014, on E4. The episode received 1.84 million viewers (according to BARB), ranking it number 1 that week on the channel; the episode had 0.46 million viewers on E4 +1, giving it a total of 2.31 million viewers.

=== Reviews ===
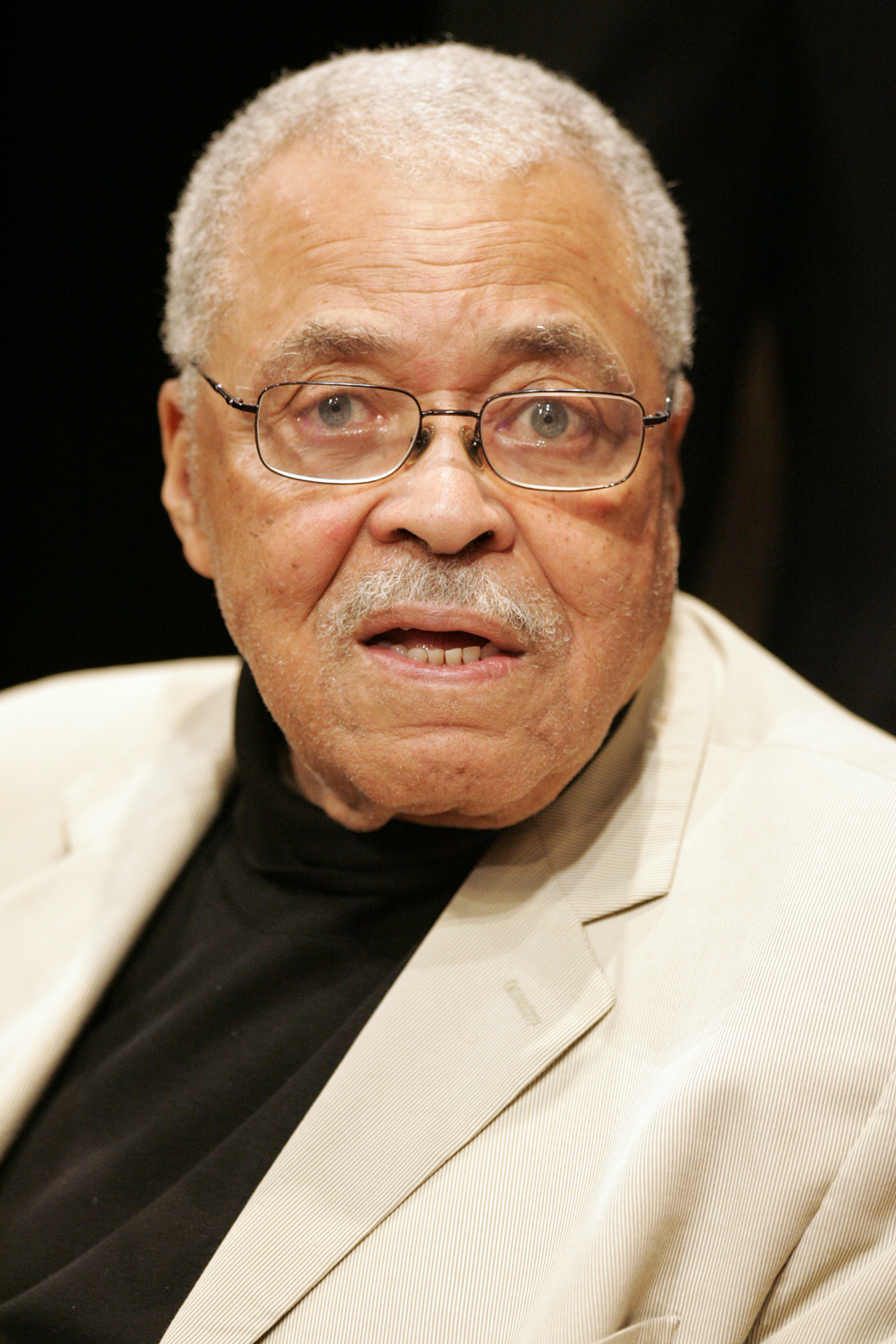
James Earl Jones' performance was well received

The episode received mostly positive reviews, with many critics complimenting James Earl Jones and Carrie Fisher's cameo appearances. Jesse Schedeen of IGN rated it eight out of 10, summarizing that "When it comes to celebrity guest stars, James Earl Jones raised the bar on this week's Big Bang Theory." Oliver Sava of The A.V. Club gave the episode a B, complimenting the show for having enough "nerd currency" to secure two high-profile guest stars in one episode; Jason Hughes of The Huffington Post agreed, describing the episode as "one of the best uses of celebrity guest stars playing themselves we've seen on television". Billy Nilles from Zap2it said "Jones has proven himself a powerful comedy performer".

Carla Day from TV Fanatic gave the episode a very positive review, describing it as "by far the funniest episode of the season" and giving it an editor rating of 4.9 out of 5. Tom Eames of Digital Spy gave it a mixed review. He complimented the cold opening, and described Carrie Fisher's "surprise cameo appearance" as "pretty cool". However, he said the girls' subplot of acting like grown-ups was "used a bit too often" and thought the scalper ticket subplot being "dropped without a conclusion" was "a shame".

However, Robin Pierson of The TV Critic rated the episode 40 out of 100, describing it as "classic bad Big Bang Theory". Pierson said "a story like this makes it a bit harder to believe in Sheldon" and suggested that Sheldon should "take something from this experience". Pierson also disliked the girls' subplot as it did not "go anywhere" and described the guys as "cowards".
