= Michael T. Good =

American astronaut (born 1962)

Michael Good
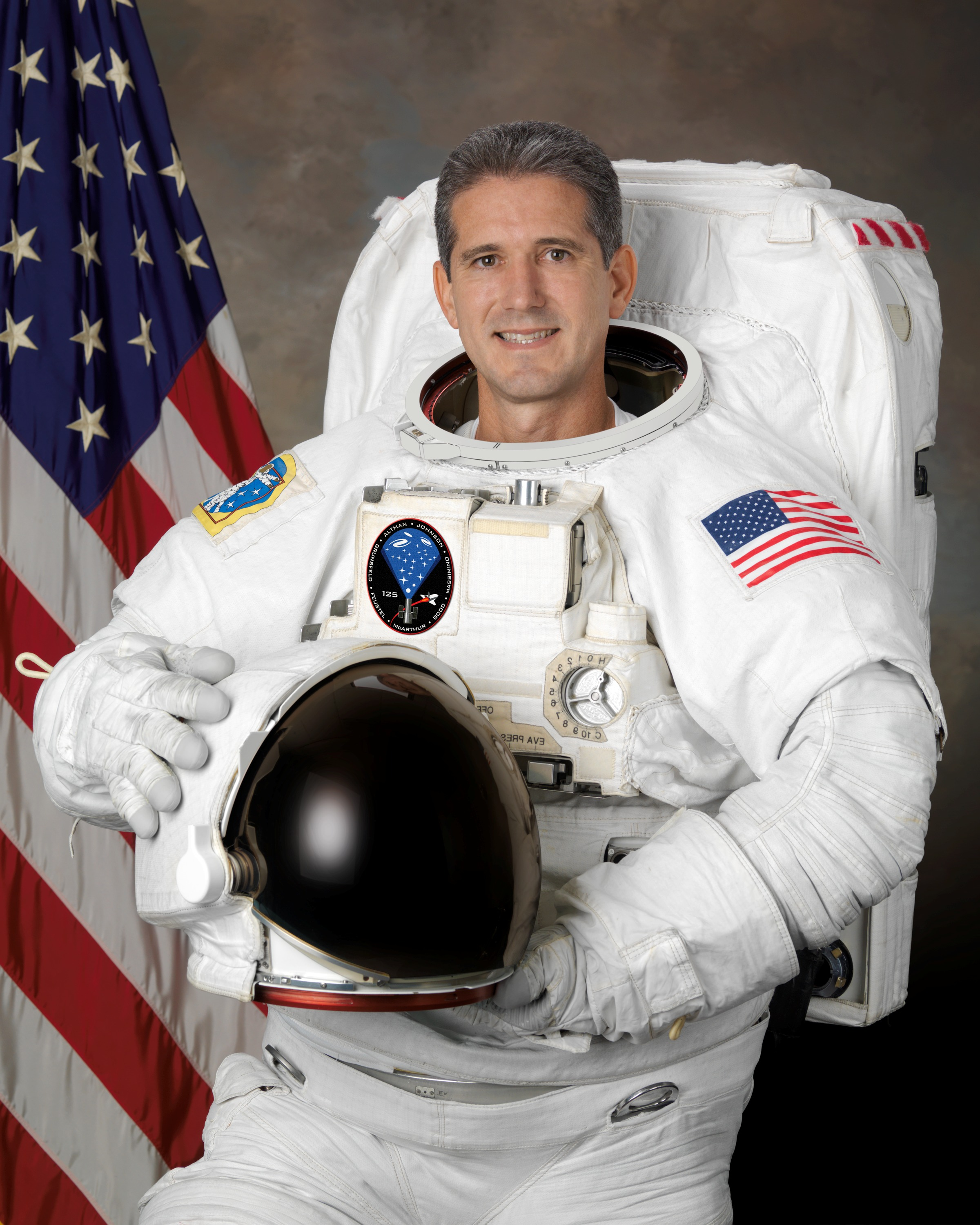
- Born: Michael Timothy Good; October 13, 1962 (age 64); Parma, Ohio, U.S.
- Other name: Bueno
- Education: University of Notre Dame (BS, MS)
- Space career

NASA astronaut
- Rank: Colonel, USAF (ret.)
- Time in space: 24d 18h 6m
- Selection: NASA Group 18 (2000)
- Total EVAs: 4
- Total EVA time: 29h 53m
- Missions: STS-125; STS-132
- Mission insignia

Michael Timothy Good (born October 13, 1962) is a retired NASA astronaut, engineer and retired commissioned officer in the United States Air Force, holding the rank of Colonel. Good flew aboard Space Shuttle Atlantis for its STS-125 mission. STS-125 was the final Hubble Space Telescope servicing mission. Good flew as mission specialist 2 to the International Space Station on STS-132.

== Early life ==
Good was born in Parma, Ohio, but was raised in Broadview Heights.

Good went to college and received a Bachelor of Science in aerospace engineering at the University of Notre Dame, before completing a Master of Science program there in 1986.

He is married to the former Joan Dickinson also of Broadview Heights. They have three children Bryan, Jason and Shannon and two grandchildren Gavin and Braxton.

Good graduated from Brecksville-Broadview Heights High School of Broadview Heights, Ohio, in 1980. He earned a Bachelor of Science in aerospace engineering from the University of Notre Dame in 1984, and a Master of Science in Aerospace Engineering from the University of Notre Dame in 1986.

== Military career ==
After graduation, he was commissioned a second lieutenant in the United States Air Force, completed his postgraduate degree, and was subsequently assigned to the USAF Tactical Air Warfare Center at Eglin Air Force Base, Florida as a flight test engineer for the BGM-109 Gryphon ground-launched cruise missile (GLCM) program. Selected for Undergraduate Navigator Training, he reported to flight training at Mather Air Force Base, California and received his wings as a USAF Navigator in 1989. He later flew the F-111 Aardvark fighter-bomber with the 20th Tactical Fighter Wing (20 TFW), later renamed the 20th Fighter Wing (20 FW) at RAF Upper Heyford, United Kingdom. He was selected for USAF Test Pilot School at Edwards Air Force Base, California in 1993 and graduated in 1994. As a military aviator, he has flown more than 30 types of aircraft, including the F-111, B-2 Spirit stealth bomber and the F-15E Strike Eagle, and has logged more than 3000 hours of flight in various jet aircraft. Good was selected and began training as a mission specialist by NASA in 2000. He is one of only two Air Force rated navigators who have been selected as astronauts (the other being Richard Mullane, selected in 1978). Both of these navigators were weapon systems officers.

== Awards and honors ==
Distinguished Graduate from the University of Notre Dame, Reserve Officer Training Corps, 1984; Lead-in Fighter Training, 1989; Squadron Officer School, 1993. Top Academic Graduate of Specialized Undergraduate Navigator Training, 1989; F-111 Replacement Training Unit, 1989; USAF Test Pilot School, 1994. Aircrew of the Year, 77th Fighter Squadron, 1991. Military decorations include the Legion of Merit, Meritorious Service Medal (4), Aerial Achievement Medal (2), Air Force Commendation Medal, Air Force Achievement Medal, Combat Readiness Medal and various other service awards.

He retired from NASA on May 31, 2019.
