= List of accolades received by Only Murders in the Building =

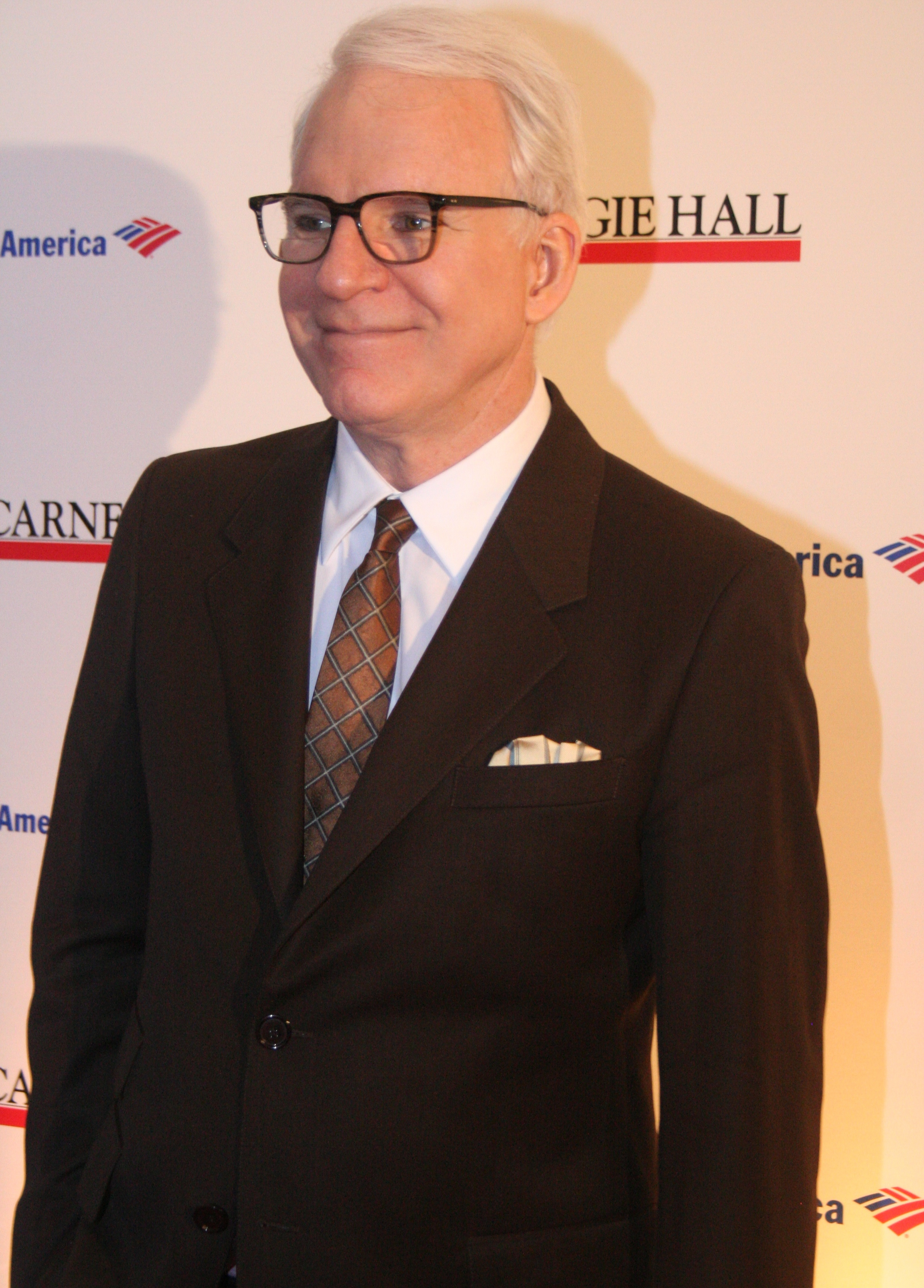
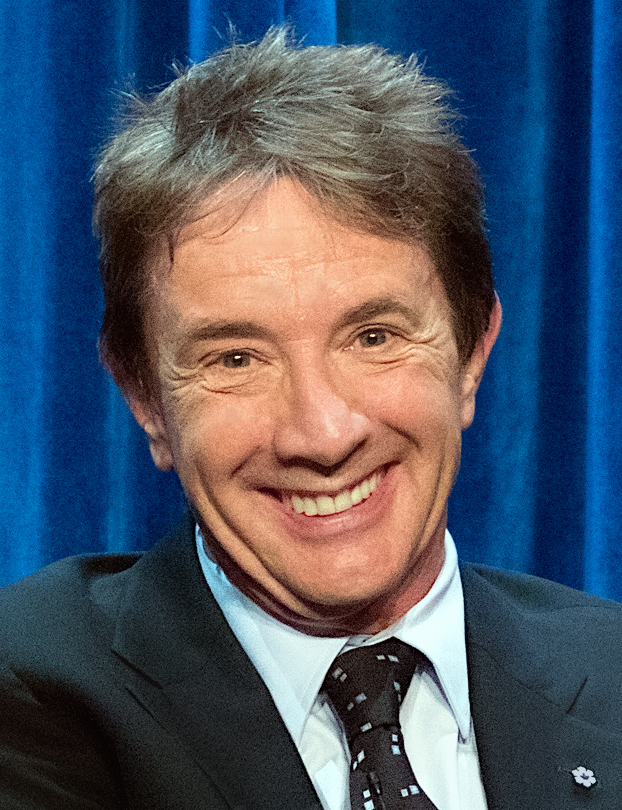
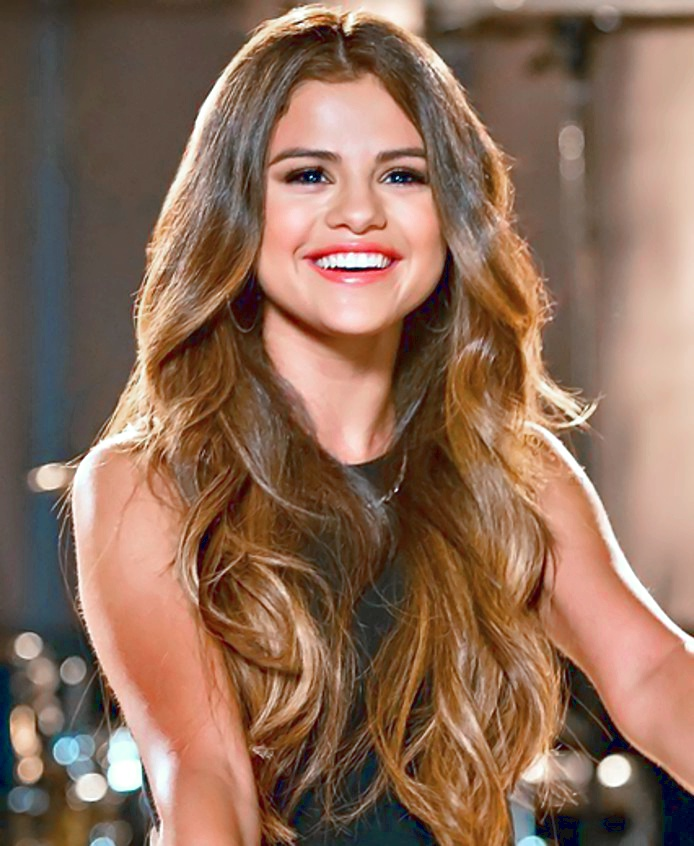
- Steve Martin, Martin Short, and Selena Gomez, have received critical acclaim.
Accolades
Award	Wins	Nominations
AACTA International Awards	0	4
AARP Movies for Grownups Awards	0	5
American Cinema Editors Awards	0	4
American Society of Cinematographers Awards	0	1
American Film Institute Awards	1	1
Art Directors Guild Awards	0	5
Artios Awards	0	4
ASCAP Screen Music Awards	5	11
Astra TV Awards	3	42
Astra Creative Arts TV Awards	1	4
Black Reel Awards	0	2
Bravo Otto	0	1
Cinema Audio Society Awards	1	4
Critics' Choice Television Awards	1	11
Dorian Awards	0	3
GLAAD Media Awards	0	1
Golden Globe Awards	0	20
Golden Trailer Awards	9	23
Gracie Awards	1	1
Hollywood Music in Media Awards	1	2
Huading Awards	0	1
Imagen Awards	0	5
MPSE Golden Reel Awards	2	7
MTV Movie & TV Awards	0	3
Peabody Awards	0	1
People's Choice Awards	4	13
Primetime Creative Arts Emmy Awards	8	42
Primetime Emmy Awards	0	17
Producers Guild of America Awards	1	7
Satellite Awards	2	18
Saturn Awards	0	1
Screen Actors Guild Awards	2	11
Set Decorators Society of America Awards	1	3
Society of Composers & Lyricists Awards	0	1
TCA Awards	0	3
Writers Guild of America Awards	0	6

Totals (Note: Certain award groups do not simply award one winner. They acknowledge several different recipients, have runners-up, and have third place. Since this is a specific recognition and is different from losing an award, runner-up mentions are considered wins in this award tally. For simplification and to avoid errors, each award in this list has been presumed to have had a prior nomination.)
- Wins: 43
- Nominations: 287

Only Murders in the Building is an American mystery comedy-drama television series created by Steve Martin and John Hoffman for the streaming service Hulu. The show premiered on August 31, 2021 with the first season, the second season premiered on June 28, 2022, the third season premiered on August 8, 2023 and the fourth season premiered on August 27, 2024. It stars Steve Martin, Martin Short and Selena Gomez as a trio of strangers, all with a shared interest in true crime podcasts, who become friends while investigating a succession of suspicious murders in the Arconia, their affluent Upper West Side apartment building, and producing their own podcast about the cases, titled Only Murders in the Building.

The series has received critical acclaim. The show won eight Primetime Creative Arts Emmy Awards from forty-two nominations and was also nominated for seventeen Primetime Emmy Awards. It also was nominated for twenty Golden Globe Awards, nine Screen Actors Guild Awards, eleven Critics' Choice Television Awards winning one and six Writers Guild of America Awards.

The seventh episode of the first season was given the Seal of Authentic Representation from the Ruderman Family Foundation for the portrayal of Theo by James Caverly, as an actor with a disability and at least five lines of dialogue. The first season was recognized with The ReFrame Stamp for hiring people of underrepresented gender identities, and of color.

== Accolades ==
Accolades received by Only Murders in the Building
Award	Year (Note: Indicates the year of ceremony)	Category	Recipient(s)	Result	Ref.
AACTA International Awards	2023	Best Comedy Series	Only Murders in the Building	Nominated	
AACTA International Awards	2024	Best Comedy Series	Only Murders in the Building	Nominated	
AACTA International Awards	2025	Best Comedy Series	Only Murders in the Building	Nominated	
AACTA International Awards	2026	Best Comedy Series	Only Murders in the Building	Nominated	
AARP Movies for Grownups Awards	2022	Best Actor (TV/Streaming)	Martin Short	Nominated	
AARP Movies for Grownups Awards	2023	Best TV Series	Only Murders in the Building	Nominated	
AARP Movies for Grownups Awards	2024	Best TV Series	Only Murders in the Building	Nominated	
AARP Movies for Grownups Awards	2024	Best Actress (TV/Streaming)	Meryl Streep	Nominated	
AARP Movies for Grownups Awards	2025	Best Actress (TV/Streaming)	Meryl Streep	Nominated	
American Cinema Editors Eddie Awards	2023	Best Edited Single Camera Comedy Series	Shelly Westerman, Payton Koch (for "I Know Who Did It")	Nominated	
American Cinema Editors Eddie Awards	2024	Best Edited Single Camera Comedy Series	Shelly Westerman, Payton Koch (for "Sitzprobe")	Nominated	
American Cinema Editors Eddie Awards	2025	Best Edited Single Camera Comedy Series	Shelly Westerman, Payton Koch (for "My Best Friend's Wedding")	Nominated	
American Cinema Editors Eddie Awards	2026	Best Edited Single Camera Comedy Series	Shelly Westerman (for "The House Always...")	Nominated	
American Society of Cinematographers Awards	2025	Outstanding Achievement in Cinematography in an Episode of a Half-Hour Television Series	Kyle Wullschleger (for "Once Upon a Time in the West")	Nominated	
American Film Institute Awards	2023	Top 10 Television Programs of the Year	Only Murders in the Building	Won (Note: This award does not have a single winner, but recognizes multiple series.)	
Art Directors Guild Awards	2022	Excellence in Production Design for a Half Hour Single-Camera Series	Curt Beech (for "True Crime")	Nominated	
Art Directors Guild Awards	2023	Excellence in Production Design for a Half Hour Single-Camera Series	Patrick Howe (for "Framed")	Nominated	
Art Directors Guild Awards	2024	Excellence in Production Design for a Half Hour Single-Camera Series	Patrick Howe (for "Sitzprobe" & "Opening Night")	Nominated	
Art Directors Guild Awards	2025	Excellence in Production Design for a Half Hour Single-Camera Series	Patrick Howe (for "Gates of Heaven" & "Valley of the Dolls")	Nominated	
Art Directors Guild Awards	2026	Excellence in Production Design for a Half Hour Single-Camera Series	Patrick Howe (for "The House Always...")	Nominated	
Artios Awards	2023	Outstanding Achievement in Casting – Television Pilot and First Season Comedy Series	Bernard Telsey, Tiffany Little Canfield, Destiny Lilly	Nominated	
Artios Awards	2024	Outstanding Achievement in Casting – Television Comedy Series	Bernard Telsey, Tiffany Little Canfield, Destiny Lilly	Nominated	
Artios Awards	2025	Outstanding Achievement in Casting – Television Comedy Series	Bernard Telsey, Tiffany Little Canfield, Destiny Lilly	Nominated	
Artios Awards	2026	Outstanding Achievement in Casting – Television Comedy Series	Bernard Telsey, Tiffany Little Canfield, Destiny Lilly	Nominated	
Artios Awards	2027	Outstanding Achievement in Casting – Television Comedy Series	Bernard Telsey, Tiffany Little Canfield, Destiny Lilly	Pending	
ASCAP Screen Music Awards	2022	Television Theme of the Year	Siddhartha Khosla	Nominated	
ASCAP Screen Music Awards	2022	Top Streaming Series	Siddhartha Khosla	Won	
ASCAP Screen Music Awards	2023	Television Score of the Year	Siddhartha Khosla	Nominated	
ASCAP Screen Music Awards	2023	Television Theme of the Year	Siddhartha Khosla	Nominated	
ASCAP Screen Music Awards	2023	Top Streaming Series	Siddhartha Khosla	Won	
ASCAP Screen Music Awards	2024	Television Score of the Year	Siddhartha Khosla	Nominated	
ASCAP Screen Music Awards	2024	Television Theme of the Year	Siddhartha Khosla	Won	
ASCAP Screen Music Awards	2024	Top Rated Streaming Series	Siddhartha Khosla, Benj Pasek, Justin Paul	Won	
ASCAP Screen Music Awards	2025	Television Score of the Year	Siddhartha Khosla	Nominated	
ASCAP Screen Music Awards	2025	Television Theme of the Year	Siddhartha Khosla	Nominated	
ASCAP Screen Music Awards	2025	Top Rated Streaming Series	Siddhartha Khosla	Won	
ASCAP Screen Music Awards	2026	Television Theme of the Year	Siddhartha Khosla	Nominated	
Astra TV Awards	2022 (Note: Previously known as Hollywood Critics Association TV Awards)	Best Streaming Series, Comedy	Only Murders in the Building	Nominated	
Astra TV Awards	2022	Best Actor in a Streaming Series, Comedy	Steve Martin	Nominated	
Astra TV Awards	2022	Best Actor in a Streaming Series, Comedy	Martin Short	Won	
Astra TV Awards	2022	Best Actress in a Streaming Series, Comedy	Selena Gomez	Won	
Astra TV Awards	2022	Best Supporting Actor in a Streaming Series, Comedy	Nathan Lane	Nominated	
Astra TV Awards	2022	Best Supporting Actress in a Streaming Series, Comedy	Amy Ryan	Nominated	
Astra TV Awards	2022	Best Directing in a Streaming Series, Comedy	Jamie Babbit (for "True Crime")	Nominated	
Astra TV Awards	2022	Best Directing in a Streaming Series, Comedy	Cherien Dabis (for "The Boy from 6B")	Nominated	
Astra TV Awards	2022	Best Writing in a Streaming Series, Comedy	Steve Martin & John Hoffman (for "True Crime")	Nominated	
Astra TV Awards	2023 (Note: The ceremony was scheduled for 2023, but was postponed to 2024 due to 2023 Hollywood labor disputes.)	Best Streaming Comedy Series	Only Murders in the Building	Nominated	
Astra TV Awards	2023	Best Actor in a Streaming Comedy Series	Steve Martin	Nominated	
Astra TV Awards	2023	Best Actor in a Streaming Comedy Series	Martin Short	Nominated	
Astra TV Awards	2023	Best Actress in a Streaming Comedy Series	Selena Gomez	Nominated	
Astra TV Awards	2023	Best Writing in a Streaming Comedy Series	John Hoffman, Matteo Borghese & Rob Turbovsky (for "I Know Who Did It")	Nominated	
Astra TV Awards	2023	Best Directing in a Streaming Comedy Series	Jamie Babbit (for "I Know Who Did It")	Nominated	
Astra TV Awards	2024	Best Streaming Comedy Series	Only Murders in the Building	Nominated	
Astra TV Awards	2024	Best Actor in a Streaming Comedy Series	Steve Martin	Nominated	
Astra TV Awards	2024	Best Actor in a Streaming Comedy Series	Martin Short	Nominated	
Astra TV Awards	2024	Best Actress in a Streaming Comedy Series	Selena Gomez	Nominated	
Astra TV Awards	2024	Best Supporting Actress in a Streaming Comedy Series	Meryl Streep	Nominated	
Astra TV Awards	2024	Best Supporting Actor in a Streaming Comedy Series	Paul Rudd	Nominated	
Astra TV Awards	2024	Best Guest Actress in a Streaming Comedy Series	Da'Vine Joy Randolph	Nominated	
Astra TV Awards	2024	Best Guest Actress in a Streaming Comedy Series	Jane Lynch	Nominated	
Astra TV Awards	2024	Best Guest Actor in a Streaming Comedy Series	Mel Brooks	Nominated	
Astra TV Awards	2024	Best Guest Actor in a Streaming Comedy Series	Matthew Broderick	Nominated	
Astra TV Awards	2024	Best Writing in a Streaming Comedy Series	John Hoffman & Ben Smith (for "Opening Night")	Nominated	
Astra TV Awards	2024	Best Directing in a Streaming Comedy Series	John Hoffman (for "The Show Must...")	Nominated	
Astra TV Awards	2024	Best Short Form Series	Only Murders in the Building: One Killer Question	Won	
Astra TV Awards	2025	Best Comedy Series	Only Murders in the Building	Nominated	
Astra TV Awards	2025	Best Actor in a Comedy Series	Steve Martin	Nominated	
Astra TV Awards	2025	Best Actor in a Comedy Series	Martin Short	Nominated	
Astra TV Awards	2025	Best Actress in a Comedy Series	Selena Gomez	Nominated	
Astra TV Awards	2025	Best Guest Actress in a Comedy Series	Melissa McCarthy	Nominated	
Astra TV Awards	2025	Best Cast Ensemble in a Streaming Comedy Series	Various	Nominated	
Astra TV Awards	2025	Best Directing in a Comedy Series	Jamie Babbit (for "My Best Friend's Wedding")	Nominated	
Astra TV Awards	2025	Best Writing in a Comedy Series	John Hoffman and J. J. Philbin (for "My Best Friend's Wedding")	Nominated	
Astra TV Awards	2026	Best Actor in a Comedy Series	Steve Martin	Nominated	
Astra TV Awards	2026	Best Actor in a Comedy Series	Martin Short	Nominated	
Astra TV Awards	2026	Best Actress in a Comedy Series	Selena Gomez	Nominated	
Astra TV Awards	2026	Best Cast Ensemble in a Streaming Comedy Series	Various	Nominated	
Astra TV Awards	2026	Best Directing in a Comedy Series	Only Murders in the Building	Nominated	
Astra TV Awards	2026	Best Writing in a Comedy Series	Only Murders in the Building	Nominated	
Astra Creative Arts TV Awards	2024	Best Short Form Series	Only Murders in the Building: One Killer Question	Nominated	
Astra Creative Arts TV Awards	2024	Best Contemporary Costumes	Only Murders in the Building	Nominated	
Astra Creative Arts TV Awards	2024	Best Main Title Design	Only Murders in the Building	Won	
Astra Creative Arts TV Awards	2024	Best Casting in a Comedy Series	Only Murders in the Building	Nominated	
Black Reel Awards for Television	2022	Outstanding Guest Actress, Comedy Series	Da'Vine Joy Randolph	Nominated	
Black Reel Awards for Television	2024	Outstanding Guest Performance in a Comedy Series	Da'Vine Joy Randolph	Nominated	
Black Reel Awards for Television	2025	Outstanding Guest Performance in a Comedy Series	Da'Vine Joy Randolph	Nominated	
Bravo Otto	2024	International Series & Films	Only Murders in the Building	Nominated	
Cinema Audio Society Awards	2022	Outstanding Achievement in Sound Mixing for Television Series – Half Hour	Joseph White Jr., Mathew Waters, Lindsey Alvarez, Alan DeMoss, Stiv Schneider, and Karina Rezhevska (for "How Well Do You Know Your Neighbors?")	Nominated	
Cinema Audio Society Awards	2023	Outstanding Achievement in Sound Mixing for Television Series – Half Hour	Joseph White Jr., Penny Harold, Andrew Garrett Lange, Alan DeMoss, Chris Navarro, Erika Koski (for "The Tell")	Won	
Cinema Audio Society Awards	2024	Outstanding Achievement in Sound Mixing for Television Series – Half Hour	Joseph White Jr., Mathew Waters, Lindsey Alvarez, Derik Lee, Alan DeMoss, Derek Pacuk, Erika Koski (for "Sitzprobe")	Nominated	
Cinema Audio Society Awards	2025	Outstanding Achievement in Sound Mixing for Television Series – Half Hour	Joseph White Jr., Kyle O'Neal, Mathew Waters, Alan DeMoss, Rodrigo Galvan, Erika Koski (for "Blow Up")	Nominated	
Cinema Audio Society Awards	2026	Outstanding Achievement in Sound Mixing for Television Series – Half Hour	Joseph White Jr., Kyle O'Neal, Mathew Waters, Alan DeMoss, Mitch Kluge (for "LESTR")	Nominated	
Critics' Choice Television Awards	2022	Best Comedy Series	Only Murders in the Building	Nominated	
Critics' Choice Television Awards	2022	Best Actor in a Comedy Series	Steve Martin	Nominated	
Critics' Choice Television Awards	2022	Best Actor in a Comedy Series	Martin Short	Nominated	
Critics' Choice Television Awards	2022	Best Actress in a Comedy Series	Selena Gomez	Nominated	
Critics' Choice Television Awards	2023	Best Actor in a Comedy Series	Steve Martin	Nominated	
Critics' Choice Television Awards	2024	Best Actor in a Comedy Series	Steve Martin	Nominated	
Critics' Choice Television Awards	2024	Best Supporting Actress in a Comedy Series	Meryl Streep	Won	
Critics' Choice Television Awards	2025	Best Comedy Series	Only Murders in the Building	Nominated	
Critics' Choice Television Awards	2025	Best Actor in a Comedy Series	Steve Martin	Nominated	
Critics' Choice Television Awards	2025	Best Actor in a Comedy Series	Martin Short	Nominated	
Critics' Choice Television Awards	2026	Best Comedy Series	Only Murders in the Building	Nominated	
Dorian Awards	2024	Best Lead TV Performance - Comedy	Martin Short	Nominated	
Dorian Awards	2024	Best Supporting TV Performance — Comedy	Meryl Streep	Nominated	
Dorian Awards	2024	Best TV Musical Performance	Steve Martin (for "Which of the Pickwick Triplets Did It?")	Nominated	
GLAAD Media Awards	2023	Outstanding Comedy Series	Only Murders in the Building	Nominated	
Golden Globe Awards	2022	Best Television Series – Musical or Comedy	Only Murders in the Building	Nominated	
Golden Globe Awards	2022	Best Actor in a Television Series – Musical or Comedy	Steve Martin	Nominated	
Golden Globe Awards	2022	Best Actor in a Television Series – Musical or Comedy	Martin Short	Nominated	
Golden Globe Awards	2023	Best Television Series – Musical or Comedy	Only Murders in the Building	Nominated	
Golden Globe Awards	2023	Best Actress in a Television Series – Musical or Comedy	Selena Gomez	Nominated	
Golden Globe Awards	2023	Best Actor in a Television Series – Musical or Comedy	Steve Martin	Nominated	
Golden Globe Awards	2023	Best Actor in a Television Series – Musical or Comedy	Martin Short	Nominated	
Golden Globe Awards	2024	Best Television Series – Musical or Comedy	Only Murders in the Building	Nominated	
Golden Globe Awards	2024	Best Actress in a Television Series – Musical or Comedy	Selena Gomez	Nominated	
Golden Globe Awards	2024	Best Actor in a Television Series – Musical or Comedy	Steve Martin	Nominated	
Golden Globe Awards	2024	Best Actor in a Television Series – Musical or Comedy	Martin Short	Nominated	
Golden Globe Awards	2024	Best Supporting Actress – Series, Miniseries or Television Film	Meryl Streep	Nominated	
Golden Globe Awards	2025	Best Television Series – Musical or Comedy	Only Murders in the Building	Nominated	
Golden Globe Awards	2025	Best Actress in a Television Series – Musical or Comedy	Selena Gomez	Nominated	
Golden Globe Awards	2025	Best Actor in a Television Series – Musical or Comedy	Steve Martin	Nominated	
Golden Globe Awards	2025	Best Actor in a Television Series – Musical or Comedy	Martin Short	Nominated	
Golden Globe Awards	2026	Best Television Series – Musical or Comedy	Only Murders in the Building	Nominated	
Golden Globe Awards	2026	Best Actress in a Television Series – Musical or Comedy	Selena Gomez	Nominated	
Golden Globe Awards	2026	Best Actor in a Television Series – Musical or Comedy	Steve Martin	Nominated	
Golden Globe Awards	2026	Best Actor in a Television Series – Musical or Comedy	Martin Short	Nominated	
Golden Trailer Awards	2022	Most Innovative Advertising for a TV/Streaming Series	Only Murders in the Building	Nominated	
Golden Trailer Awards	2022	Best Viral Campaign for a TV/Streaming Series	Only Murders in the Building	Won	
Golden Trailer Awards	2023	Best Comedy for a TV/Streaming Series (Trailer/Teaser/TV Spot)	Only Murders in the Building: Persons of Interest	Nominated	
Golden Trailer Awards	2023	Best Sound Editing for a TV/Streaming Series (Trailer/Teaser/TV Spot)	Only Murders in the Building: Click	Won	
Golden Trailer Awards	2023	Most Innovative Advertising for a TV/Streaming Series	Only Murders in the Building – Times Square Sweepstakes	Nominated	
Golden Trailer Awards	2023	Best Comedy / Drama TrailerByte for a TV / Streaming Series	Only Murders in the Building, "Evidence"	Won	
Golden Trailer Awards	2023	Best Viral Campaign for a TV / Streaming Series	Only Murders in the Building, "Paid Social Campaign"	Won	
Golden Trailer Awards	2023	Best Comedy Poster for a TV/Streaming Series	Only Murders in the Building	Won	
Golden Trailer Awards	2024	Best Comedy for a TV/Streaming Series (Trailer/Teaser/TV Spot)	Only Murders in the Building: Break A Leg	Nominated	
Golden Trailer Awards	2024	Most Innovative Advertising for a TV/Streaming Series	Only Murders in the Building – "Broadway"	Nominated	
Golden Trailer Awards	2024	Most Innovative Advertising for a TV/Streaming Series	Only Murders in the Building – Backstage at the Goosebury Experience	Won	
Golden Trailer Awards	2024	Best Comedy / Drama TrailerByte for a TV / Streaming Series	Only Murders in the Building – "Broadway"	Won	
Golden Trailer Awards	2025	Best Comedy (Trailer/Teaser) – TV/Streaming Series	Only Murders in the Building, Trailer	Nominated	
Golden Trailer Awards	2025	Best Comedy TV Spot – TV/Streaming Series	Only Murders in the Building, Movie	Nominated	
Golden Trailer Awards	2025	Best Viral Campaign (TV/Streaming Series)	Only Murders in the Building – Social Teaser Campaign	Won	
Golden Trailer Awards	2025	Best Comedy Poster (for a TV/streaming series)	Only Murders in the Building – Key Art	Nominated	
Golden Trailer Awards	2025	Best Wildposts (for a TV/streaming series)	Only Murders in the Building – Character Banners	Won	
Golden Trailer Awards	2026	Best Comedy Trailer for a TV/Streaming Series	Only Murders in the Building	Nominated	
Golden Trailer Awards	2026	Best Comedy TrailerByte for a TV/Streaming Series	Only Murders in the Building – "Casino"	Nominated	
Golden Trailer Awards	2026	Best Comedy TrailerByte for a TV/Streaming Series	Only Murders in the Building, Gen-Z Season Recap	Nominated	
Golden Trailer Awards	2026	Best Viral Campaign for a TV/Streaming Series	Only Murders in the Building, 360 Campaign	Nominated	
Golden Trailer Awards	2026	Most Innovative Advertising for a TV/Streaming Series	Only Murders in the Building, 360 Campaign	Nominated	
Golden Trailer Awards	2026	Best Comedy Poster (for a TV/streaming series)	Only Murders in the Building, Key Art	Nominated	
Gracie Awards	2024	TV – National (Comedy)	Only Murders in the Building	Won	
Hollywood Music in Media Awards	2023	Best Original Song in a TV Show/Limited Series	Benj Pasek, Justin Paul, Marc Shaiman, and Scott Wittman (for "Which of the Pickwick Triplets Did It?")	Nominated	
Hollywood Music in Media Awards	2023	Song – Onscreen Performance (TV Show/Limited Series)	Benj Pasek, Justin Paul, Marc Shaiman, and Scott Wittman (for "Which of the Pickwick Triplets Did It?")	Won	
Huading Awards	2023	Global Most Popular Actor in a TV Series	Steve Martin	Nominated	
Imagen Awards	2022	Best Actress – Comedy (Television)	Selena Gomez	Nominated	
Imagen Awards	2022	Best Supporting Actor – Comedy (Television)	Aaron Dominguez	Nominated	
Imagen Awards	2024	Best Supporting Actor – Comedy (Television)	Adrian Martinez	Nominated	
Imagen Awards	2025	Best Actress – Comedy (Television)	Selena Gomez	Nominated	
Imagen Awards	2026	Best Actor – Comedy (Television)	Selena Gomez	Nominated	
MPSE Golden Reel Awards	2022	Outstanding Achievement in Sound Editing – Live Action Under 35 Minutes	Mathew Waters, Danika Wikke, Meredith Stacy, and Micha Liberman (for "The Boy From 6B")	Won	
MPSE Golden Reel Awards	2023	Outstanding Achievement in Sound Editing – Broadcast Short Form	Matthew Waters, Danika Wikke, Borja Sau, Eric Offin, Arno Stephanian, Sanaa Kelley, Adam DeCoster (for "Framed")	Nominated	
MPSE Golden Reel Awards	2024	Outstanding Achievement in Music Editing – Broadcast Short Form	Micha Liberman (for "Opening Night")	Nominated	
MPSE Golden Reel Awards	2025	Outstanding Achievement in Sound Editing – Broadcast Short Form	Mathew Waters, Danika Wikke, Meredith Stacy, Christopher Gomez, Erika Koski, Iris Dutour and Sanaa Kelley (for "Blow Up")	Nominated	
MPSE Golden Reel Awards	2025	Outstanding Achievement in Music Editing – Broadcast Short Form	Micha Liberman (for "My Best Friend's Wedding")	Won	
MPSE Golden Reel Awards	2026	Outstanding Achievement in Sound Editing – Broadcast Short Form	Mathew Waters, Danika Wikke, Brad Katona, Brian Dunlop, Iris Dutour and Sanaa Kelley (for "LESTR")	Nominated	
MPSE Golden Reel Awards	2026	Outstanding Achievement in Music Editing – Broadcast Short Form	Micha Liberman (for "The House Always...")	Nominated	
MTV Movie & TV Awards	2022	Best Team	Selena Gomez, Steve Martin, and Martin Short	Nominated	
MTV Movie & TV Awards	2023	Best Performance in a Show	Selena Gomez	Nominated	
MTV Movie & TV Awards	2023	Best Kiss	Selena Gomez and Cara Delevingne	Nominated	
Peabody Awards	2022	Entertainment	Only Murders in the Building	Nominated	
People's Choice Awards	2021	The Comedy Show of 2021	Only Murders in the Building	Nominated	
People's Choice Awards	2021	The Comedy TV Star of 2021	Selena Gomez	Won	
People's Choice Awards	2021	The Comedy TV Star of 2021	Steve Martin	Nominated	
People's Choice Awards	2022	The Comedy Show of 2022	Only Murders in the Building	Nominated	
People's Choice Awards	2022	The Female TV Star of 2022	Selena Gomez	Nominated	
People's Choice Awards	2022	The Comedy TV Star of 2022	Selena Gomez	Won	
People's Choice Awards	2024	The Show of the Year	Only Murders in the Building	Nominated	
People's Choice Awards	2024	The Comedy Show of the Year	Only Murders in the Building	Won	
People's Choice Awards	2024	The Male TV Star of the Year	Steve Martin	Nominated	
People's Choice Awards	2024	The Female TV Star of the Year	Selena Gomez	Won	
People's Choice Awards	2024	The Comedy TV Star of the Year	Steve Martin	Nominated	
People's Choice Awards	2024	The Comedy TV Star of the Year	Selena Gomez	Nominated	
People's Choice Awards	2024	The TV Performance of the Year	Meryl Streep	Nominated	
Primetime Creative Arts Emmy Awards	2022	Outstanding Guest Actor in a Comedy Series	Nathan Lane (for "The Boy From 6B")	Won	
Primetime Creative Arts Emmy Awards	2022	Outstanding Guest Actress in a Comedy Series	Jane Lynch (for "Double Time")	Nominated	
Primetime Creative Arts Emmy Awards	2022	Outstanding Casting for a Comedy Series	Bernard Telsey and Tiffany Little Canfield	Nominated	
Primetime Creative Arts Emmy Awards	2022	Outstanding Contemporary Costumes	Dana Covarrubias, Amanda Bujak, and Amy Burt (for "Who Is Tim Kono?")	Nominated	
Primetime Creative Arts Emmy Awards	2022	Outstanding Main Title Design	Lisa Bolan, Tnaya Witmer, Laura Perez, James Hurlburt, Evan Larimore, and Jahmad Rollins Rollins	Nominated	
Primetime Creative Arts Emmy Awards	2022	Outstanding Music Composition for a Series (Original Dramatic Score)	Siddhartha Khosla (for "The Boy From 6B")	Nominated	
Primetime Creative Arts Emmy Awards	2022	Outstanding Original Main Title Theme Music	Siddhartha Khosla	Nominated	
Primetime Creative Arts Emmy Awards	2022	Outstanding Production Design for a Narrative Program (Half-Hour)	Curt Beech, Jordan Jacobs, and Rich Murray (for "True Crime")	Won	
Primetime Creative Arts Emmy Awards	2022	Outstanding Single-Camera Picture Editing for a Comedy Series	JoAnne Marie Yarrow (for "Fan Fiction")	Nominated	
Primetime Creative Arts Emmy Awards	2022	Outstanding Single-Camera Picture Editing for a Comedy Series	Julie Monroe (for "Open and Shut")	Nominated	
Primetime Creative Arts Emmy Awards	2022	Outstanding Sound Mixing for a Comedy or Drama Series (Half-Hour) and Animation	Lindsey Alvarez, Mathew Waters, Joseph White Jr. and Alan Demoss (for "The Boy from 6B")	Won	
Primetime Creative Arts Emmy Awards	2023	Outstanding Short Form Comedy, Drama or Variety Series	Only Murders in the Building: One Killer Question	Nominated	
Primetime Creative Arts Emmy Awards	2023	Outstanding Guest Actor in a Comedy Series	Nathan Lane (for "Here's Looking at You")	Nominated	
Primetime Creative Arts Emmy Awards	2023	Outstanding Production Design for a Narrative Program (Half-Hour)	Patrick Howe, Jordan Jacobs, and Rich Murray (for "Sparring Partners" / "I Know Who Did It")	Won	
Primetime Creative Arts Emmy Awards	2023	Outstanding Casting for a Comedy Series	Bernard Telsey, Tiffany Canfield, and Destiny Lilly	Nominated	
Primetime Creative Arts Emmy Awards	2023	Outstanding Cinematography for a Series (Half-Hour)	Chris Teague (for "I Know Who Did It")	Nominated	
Primetime Creative Arts Emmy Awards	2023	Outstanding Contemporary Costumes	Dana Covarrubias, Abby Geoghegan, and Kathleen Gerlach (for "Framed")	Nominated	
Primetime Creative Arts Emmy Awards	2023	Outstanding Contemporary Hairstyling	Betsy Reyes, Tonia Ciccone, Fabian Gonzalez, and Kerrie Smith (for "I Know Who Did It")	Nominated	
Primetime Creative Arts Emmy Awards	2023	Outstanding Single-Camera Picture Editing for a Comedy Series	Peggy Tachdjian (for "The Last Day of Bunny Folger")	Nominated	
Primetime Creative Arts Emmy Awards	2023	Outstanding Sound Mixing for a Comedy or Drama Series (Half-Hour) and Animation	Penny Harold, Andrew Lange, Joseph White Jr., and Alan DeMoss (for "The Tell")	Nominated	
Primetime Creative Arts Emmy Awards	2024	Outstanding Short Form Comedy, Drama or Variety Series	Only Murders in the Building: One Killer Question	Won	
Primetime Creative Arts Emmy Awards	2024	Outstanding Guest Actor in a Comedy Series	Matthew Broderick (for "CoBro")	Nominated	
Primetime Creative Arts Emmy Awards	2024	Outstanding Guest Actress in a Comedy Series	Da'Vine Joy Randolph (for "Sitzprobe")	Nominated	
Primetime Creative Arts Emmy Awards	2024	Outstanding Production Design for a Narrative Program (Half-Hour)	Patrick Howe, Casey Smith, and Rich Murray (for "Opening Night")	Won	
Primetime Creative Arts Emmy Awards	2024	Outstanding Casting for a Comedy Series	Bernard Telsey, Tiffany Canfield, and Destiny Lilly	Nominated	
Primetime Creative Arts Emmy Awards	2024	Outstanding Choreography for Scripted Programming	John Carrafa (for "Oliver's Dream Sequence" / "Creatures of the Night")	Nominated	
Primetime Creative Arts Emmy Awards	2024	Outstanding Contemporary Costumes	Dana Covarrubias, Kathleen Gerlach, and Abby Geoghegan (for "Sitzprobe")	Nominated	
Primetime Creative Arts Emmy Awards	2024	Outstanding Contemporary Hairstyling	Jameson Eaton, Jimmy Goode, Leah Loukas, and J. Roy Helland (for "Opening Night")	Nominated	
Primetime Creative Arts Emmy Awards	2024	Outstanding Contemporary Makeup (Non-Prosthetic)	Arielle Toelke, Kim Taylor, and Joelle Troisi (for "Opening Night")	Nominated	
Primetime Creative Arts Emmy Awards	2024	Outstanding Music Composition for a Series (Original Dramatic Score)	Siddhartha Khosla (for "Sitzprobe")	Won	
Primetime Creative Arts Emmy Awards	2024	Outstanding Original Music and Lyrics	Benj Pasek, Justin Paul, Marc Shaiman, and Scott Wittman (for "Which of the Pickwick Triplets Did It?" / "Sitzprobe")	Won	
Primetime Creative Arts Emmy Awards	2024	Outstanding Music Supervision	Bruce Gilbert and Lauren Marie Mikus (for "Grab Your Hankies")	Nominated	
Primetime Creative Arts Emmy Awards	2024	Outstanding Single-Camera Picture Editing for a Comedy Series	Shelly Westerman and Payton Koch (for "Sitzprobe")	Nominated	
Primetime Creative Arts Emmy Awards	2024	Outstanding Single-Camera Picture Editing for a Comedy Series	Peggy Tachdjian (for "The White Room")	Nominated	
Primetime Creative Arts Emmy Awards	2024	Outstanding Sound Editing for a Comedy or Drama Series (Half-Hour) and Animation	Mathew Waters, Danika Wikke, Taylor Jackson, Meredith Stacy, Erika Koski, Micha Liberman, Sanaa Kelley, and Iris Dutour (for "Sitzprobe")	Nominated	
Primetime Creative Arts Emmy Awards	2024	Outstanding Sound Mixing for a Comedy or Drama Series (Half-Hour) and Animation	Matthew Waters, Lindsey Alvarez, Joseph White Jr., Alan DeMoss, and Derik Lee (for "Sitzprobe")	Nominated	
Primetime Creative Arts Emmy Awards	2025	Outstanding Production Design for a Narrative Program (Half-Hour)	Patrick Howe, Casey Smith, and Mila Khalevich (for "Gates of Heaven" / "Valley of the Dolls")	Nominated	
Primetime Creative Arts Emmy Awards	2025	Outstanding Casting for a Comedy Series	Bernard Telsey, Tiffany Canfield, and Destiny Lilly	Nominated	
Primetime Creative Arts Emmy Awards	2025	Outstanding Contemporary Makeup (Non-Prosthetic)	Arielle Toelke, Kim Taylor, Joelle Troisi, and Ana Sorys (for "Valley of the Dolls")	Nominated	
Primetime Creative Arts Emmy Awards	2025	Outstanding Short Form Nonfiction or Reality Series	Shannon Ryan, Aaron Goldman, Trisha Choate, Jillian Novak, Xavier Salas, and Steve Pollard (for Only Murders In The Building: Unlocking the Mystery)	Nominated	
Primetime Creative Arts Emmy Awards	2025	Outstanding Sound Mixing for a Comedy or Drama Series (Half-Hour) and Animation	Matthew Waters, Kyle O'Neal, Joseph White Jr., and Alan DeMoss (for "Once Upon a Time in the West")	Nominated	
Primetime Creative Arts Emmy Awards	2025	Outstanding Stunt Coordination for Comedy Programming	Chris Barnes	Nominated	
Primetime Creative Arts Emmy Awards	2026	Outstanding Production Design for a Narrative Program (Half-Hour)	Patrick Howe, Casey Smith, and Mila Khalevich (for "The House Always...")	Nominated	
Primetime Creative Arts Emmy Awards	2026	Outstanding Casting for a Comedy Series	Bernard Telsey, Tiffany Canfield and Destiny Lilly	Nominated	
Primetime Creative Arts Emmy Awards	2026	Outstanding Contemporary Costumes for a Series	Dana Covarrubias, Amy Bert, Abigail Geoghegan, Liana John (for "After You")	Nominated	
Primetime Emmy Awards	2022	Outstanding Comedy Series	Various (Note: Dan Fogelman, Jess Rosenthal, Jamie Babbit, Steve Martin, Martin Short, Selena Gomez and John Hoffman, executive producers; Kristin Newman and Kirker Butler, co-executive producers; Ben Smith, Matteo Borghese and Rob Turbovsky, supervising producers; Thembi L. Banks, producer; Jane Raab, produced by)	Nominated	
Primetime Emmy Awards	2022	Outstanding Lead Actor in a Comedy Series	Steve Martin	Nominated	
Primetime Emmy Awards	2022	Outstanding Lead Actor in a Comedy Series	Martin Short	Nominated	
Primetime Emmy Awards	2022	Outstanding Directing for a Comedy Series	Jamie Babbit (for "True Crime")	Nominated	
Primetime Emmy Awards	2022	Outstanding Directing for a Comedy Series	Cherien Dabis (for "The Boy From 6B")	Nominated	
Primetime Emmy Awards	2022	Outstanding Writing for a Comedy Series	Steve Martin and John Hoffman (for "True Crime")	Nominated	
Primetime Emmy Awards	2023	Outstanding Comedy Series	Various (Note: Dan Fogelman, Jess Rosenthal, Steve Martin, Martin Short, Selena Gomez and John Hoffman, executive producers; Matteo Borghese, Rob Turbovsky, Ben Smith, Kristin Newman and Kirker Butler, co-executive producers; Nick Pavonetti, producer; Kristin Bernstein, produced by)	Nominated	
Primetime Emmy Awards	2023	Outstanding Lead Actor in a Comedy Series	Martin Short	Nominated	
Primetime Emmy Awards	2023	Outstanding Writing for a Comedy Series	John Hoffman, Matteo Borghese, and Rob Turbovsky (for "I Know Who Did It")	Nominated	
Primetime Emmy Awards	2024	Outstanding Comedy Series	Various (Note: Dan Fogelman, Jess Rosenthal, Steve Martin, Martin Short, Selena Gomez and John Hoffman, executive producers; Matteo Borghese, Rob Turbovsky, Ben Smith, Elaine Ko and J. J. Philbin, co-executive producers; Nick Pavonetti, Madeleine George, Sas Goldberg and Tess Morris, producers; Kristin Bernstein, produced by)	Nominated	
Primetime Emmy Awards	2024	Outstanding Lead Actor in a Comedy Series	Steve Martin	Nominated	
Primetime Emmy Awards	2024	Outstanding Lead Actor in a Comedy Series	Martin Short	Nominated	
Primetime Emmy Awards	2024	Outstanding Lead Actress in a Comedy Series	Selena Gomez	Nominated	
Primetime Emmy Awards	2024	Outstanding Supporting Actor in a Comedy Series	Paul Rudd	Nominated	
Primetime Emmy Awards	2024	Outstanding Supporting Actress in a Comedy Series	Meryl Streep	Nominated	
Primetime Emmy Awards	2025	Outstanding Comedy Series	Various (Note: Dan Fogelman, Jess Rosenthal, Steve Martin, Martin Short, Selena Gomez and John Hoffman, executive producers; Ben Smith, Matteo Borghese, Rob Turbovsky, J. J. Philbin, Rick Wiener, Kenny Schwartz and Kristin Bernstein, co-executive producers; Madeleine George, supervising producer; Joshua Allen Griffith and Jill Risk Wolfe, producers)	Nominated	
Primetime Emmy Awards	2025	Outstanding Lead Actor in a Comedy Series	Martin Short	Nominated	
Primetime Emmy Awards	2026	Outstanding Comedy Series	Various (Note: Dan Fogelman, Jess Rosenthal, Steve Martin, Martin Short, Selena Gomez and John Hoffman, executive producers; Ben Smith, Matteo Borghese, Rob Turbovsky, J. J. Philbin, Rick Wiener, Kenny Schwartz and Kristin Bernstein, co-executive producers; Madeleine George, supervising producer; Joshua Allen Griffith and Jill Risk Wolfe, producers)	Nominated	
Primetime Emmy Awards	2026	Outstanding Lead Actor in a Comedy Series	Martin Short	Nominated	
Producers Guild of America Awards	2022	Best Episodic Comedy	Only Murders in the Building	Nominated	
Producers Guild of America Awards	2023	Best Episodic Comedy	Various (Note: Dan Fogelman, Jess Rosenthal, Steve Martin, Martin Short, Selena Gomez, John Hoffman, Matteo Borghese, Rob Turbovsky, Ben Smith, Kristin Newman, Kirker Butler, Nick Pavonetti, Kristin Bernstein, Valentina Garza)	Nominated	
Producers Guild of America Awards	2023	Outstanding Short-Form Program	Only Murders in the Building: One Killer Question	Won	
Producers Guild of America Awards	2024	Outstanding Short-Form Program	Only Murders in the Building: One Killer Question	Nominated	
Producers Guild of America Awards	2024	Best Episodic Comedy	Various	Nominated	
Producers Guild of America Awards	2025	Best Episodic Comedy	Various	Nominated	
Producers Guild of America Awards	2026	Best Episodic Comedy	Various (Note: Dan Fogelman, Jess Rosenthal, Steve Martin, Martin Short, Selena Gomez, John Hoffman, Matteo Borghese, Rob Turbovsky, Ben Smith, Kristin Newman, Kirker Butler, Nick Pavonetti, Kristin Bernstein, Valentina Garza)	Nominated	
Satellite Awards	2022	Best Television Series – Musical or Comedy	Only Murders in the Building	Nominated	
Satellite Awards	2022	Best Actor in a Television Series – Musical or Comedy	Steve Martin	Nominated	
Satellite Awards	2022	Best Actress in a Television Series – Musical or Comedy	Selena Gomez	Nominated	
Satellite Awards	2023	Best Television Series – Musical or Comedy	Only Murders in the Building	Nominated	
Satellite Awards	2023	Best Actress in a Television Series – Musical or Comedy	Selena Gomez	Won	
Satellite Awards	2023	Best Actor in a Television Series – Musical or Comedy	Martin Short	Nominated	
Satellite Awards	2024	Best Television Series – Musical or Comedy	Only Murders in the Building	Won	
Satellite Awards	2024	Best Actress in a Television Series – Musical or Comedy	Selena Gomez	Nominated	
Satellite Awards	2024	Best Actor in a Television Series – Musical or Comedy	Steve Martin	Nominated	
Satellite Awards	2024	Best Actor in a Television Series – Musical or Comedy	Martin Short	Nominated	
Satellite Awards	2024	Best Actress in a Supporting Role in a Series, Miniseries & Limited Series, or Motion Picture Made for Television	Meryl Streep	Nominated	
Satellite Awards	2025	Best Television Series – Musical or Comedy	Only Murders in the Building	Nominated	
Satellite Awards	2025	Best Actress in a Television Series – Musical or Comedy	Selena Gomez	Nominated	
Satellite Awards	2025	Best Actor in a Television Series – Musical or Comedy	Martin Short	Nominated	
Satellite Awards	2026	Best Television Series – Musical or Comedy	Only Murders in the Building	Nominated	
Satellite Awards	2026	Best Actress in a Television Series – Musical or Comedy	Selena Gomez	Nominated	
Satellite Awards	2026	Best Actor in a Television Series – Musical or Comedy	Steve Martin	Nominated	
Satellite Awards	2026	Best Actor in a Television Series – Musical or Comedy	Martin Short	Nominated	
Saturn Awards	2025	Best Genre Comedy Television Series	Only Murders in the Building	Nominated	
Screen Actors Guild Awards	2022	Outstanding Performance by a Male Actor in a Comedy Series	Steve Martin	Nominated	
Screen Actors Guild Awards	2022	Outstanding Performance by a Male Actor in a Comedy Series	Martin Short	Nominated	
Screen Actors Guild Awards	2022	Outstanding Performance by an Ensemble in a Comedy Series	Aaron Dominguez, Selena Gomez, Jackie Hoffman, Jayne Houdyshell, Steve Martin, Amy Ryan, and Martin Short	Nominated	
Screen Actors Guild Awards	2023	Outstanding Performance by a Male Actor in a Comedy Series	Steve Martin	Nominated	
Screen Actors Guild Awards	2023	Outstanding Performance by a Male Actor in a Comedy Series	Martin Short	Nominated	
Screen Actors Guild Awards	2023	Outstanding Performance by an Ensemble in a Comedy Series	Michael Cyril Creighton, Cara Delevingne, Selena Gomez, Jayne Houdyshell, Steve Martin, Martin Short, and Adina Verson	Nominated	
Screen Actors Guild Awards	2024	Outstanding Performance by an Ensemble in a Comedy Series	Gerald Caesar, Michael Cyril Creighton, Linda Emond, Selena Gomez, Allison Guinn, Steve Martin, Ashley Park, Don Darryl Rivera, Paul Rudd, Jeremy Shamos, Martin Short, Meryl Streep, Wesley Taylor, Jason Veasey, and Jesse Williams	Nominated	
Screen Actors Guild Awards	2025	Outstanding Performance by a Male Actor in a Comedy Series	Martin Short	Won	
Screen Actors Guild Awards	2025	Outstanding Performance by an Ensemble in a Comedy Series	Michael Cyril Creighton, Zach Galifianakis, Selena Gomez, Richard Kind, Eugene Levy, Eva Longoria, Steve Martin, Kumail Nanjiani, Molly Shannon, and Martin Short	Won	
Screen Actors Guild Awards	2026	Outstanding Performance by a Male Actor in a Comedy Series	Martin Short	Nominated	
Screen Actors Guild Awards	2026	Outstanding Performance by an Ensemble in a Comedy Series	Michael Cyril Creighton, Beanie Feldstein, Jermaine Fowler, Selena Gomez, Jackie Hoffman, Steve Martin, Martin Short and Dianne Wiest	Nominated	
Set Decorators Society of America Awards	2023	Best Achievement in Decor/Design of a Half-Hour Single-Camera Series	Rich Murray & Patrick Howe	Won	
Set Decorators Society of America Awards	2024	Best Achievement in Decor/Design of a Half-Hour Single-Camera Series	Rich Murray & Patrick Howe	Nominated	
Set Decorators Society of America Awards	2025	Best Achievement in Decor/Design of a Half-Hour Single-Camera Series	Mila Khalevich & Patrick Howe	Nominated	
Set Decorators Society of America Awards	2026	Best Achievement in Decor/Design of a Half-Hour Single-Camera Series	Mila Khalevich & Patrick Howe	Nominated	
Society of Composers & Lyricists Awards	2023	Outstanding Score for Television	Siddhartha Khosla	Nominated	
Television Critics Association Awards	2022	Outstanding New Program	Only Murders in the Building	Nominated	
Television Critics Association Awards	2022	Outstanding Achievement in Comedy	Only Murders in the Building	Nominated	
Television Critics Association Awards	2022	Individual Achievement in Comedy	Steve Martin	Nominated	
Writers Guild of America Awards	2022	Comedy Series	Various (Note: Thembi Banks, Matteo Borghese, Rachel Burger, Kirker Butler, Madeleine George, John Hoffman, Stephen Markley, Steve Martin, Kristin Newman, Ben Philippe, Kim Rosenstock, Ben Smith, Rob Turbovsky)	Nominated	
Writers Guild of America Awards	2022	New Series	Various	Nominated	
Writers Guild of America Awards	2022	Episodic Comedy	Steve Martin & John Hoffman (for "True Crime")	Nominated	
Writers Guild of America Awards	2023	Comedy Series	Various (Note: Matteo Borghese, Rachel Burger, Kirker Butler, Valentina Garza, Madeleine George, Joshua Allen Griffith, John Hoffman, Noah Levine, Stephen Markley, Kristin Newman, Ben Philippe, Ben Smith, Rob Turbovsky)	Nominated	
Writers Guild of America Awards	2024	Comedy Series	Various (Note: Matteo Borghese, Madeleine George, Sas E. Goldberg, Joshua Allen Griffith, John Hoffman, Elaine Ko, Noah Levine, Tess Morris, J.J. Philbin, Ben Philippe, Jake Schnesel, Ben Smith, Siena Streiber, Pete Swanson, Rob Turbovsky)	Nominated	
Writers Guild of America Awards	2025	Episodic Comedy	John Hoffman & Joshua Allen Griffith (for "Once Upon A Time in the West")	Nominated	
