= Primetime Emmy Award for Outstanding Production Design for a Narrative Program (Half-Hour) =

American television award

Primetime Emmy Award for Production Design for a Narrative Program (Half-Hour)
- Awarded for: Outstanding Production Design for a Narrative Program (Half-Hour)
- Country: United States
- Presented by: Academy of Television Arts & Sciences
- Currently held by: Widow's Bay (2026)
- Website: emmys.com

The Primetime Emmy Award for Outstanding Production Design for a Narrative Program (Half-Hour) is an award handed out annually at the Creative Arts Emmy Awards. In 2014, the category was created alongside Outstanding Production Design for a Narrative Period or Fantasy Program (One Hour or More) and the Outstanding Production Design for a Narrative Contemporary Program (One Hour or More).

Rules require that nominations are distributed proportionally among multi-camera and single-camera series, based on the number of submissions of each. For instance, if two-fifths of submissions are multi-camera then two of the five nominees will be multi-camera.

== Winners and nominations ==
=== 2000s ===
| Year | Program | Episode(s) | Nominees | Network |
|---|---|---|---|---|
| 2000 (52nd) | Art Direction for a Multi-Camera Series | | | |
| 2000 (52nd) | Love & Money | "Pilot" | Dahl Delu, Rusty Lipscomb | CBS |
| 2000 (52nd) | Dharma & Greg | "Hell to the Chief" | Anne H. Ahrens, John Shaffner | ABC |
| 2000 (52nd) | 3rd Rock from the Sun | "Dial M for Dick" | Garvin Eddy, Tara Stephenson | NBC |
| 2000 (52nd) | Will & Grace | "Ben? Her?" | Melinda Ritz, Glenda Rovello | NBC |
2001 (53rd)
| 2001 (53rd) | Will & Grace | "Lows in the Mid-Eighties" | Melinda Ritz, Glenda Rovello | NBC |
| 2001 (53rd) | Bette | "Pilot" | Lynda Burbank, Bernard Vyzga | CBS |
| 2001 (53rd) | Frasier | "Cranes Go Caribbean" | Roy Christopher, Ron Olsen | NBC |
| 2001 (53rd) | Friends | "The One with Monica and Chandler's Wedding" | Greg Grande, John Shaffner, Joe Stewart | NBC |
| 2001 (53rd) | Three Sisters | "Pilot" | Dwight Jackson, John Shaffner, Joe Stewart | NBC |
2002 (54th)
| 2002 (54th) | Will & Grace | "Cheatin' Trouble Blues" | Melinda Ritz, Glenda Rovello | NBC |
| 2002 (54th) | Emeril | "Halloween" | Leslie Frankenheimer, Dwight Jackson, Ed LaPorta | NBC |
| 2002 (54th) | Friends | "The One Where Rachel Has a Baby" | Greg Grande, John Shaffner, Joe Stewart | NBC |
| 2002 (54th) | That '70s Show | "That '70s Musical" | Garvin Eddy, Tara Stephenson | Fox |
| 2002 (54th) | Titus | "Into Thin Air" | Stephan G. Olson, William V. Ryder, Richard C. Walker | Fox |
2003 (55th)
| 2003 (55th) | Will & Grace | "24" | Melinda Ritz, Glenda Rovello | NBC |
| 2003 (55th) | Friends | "The One in Barbados" | Greg Grande, John Shaffner, Joe Stewart | NBC |
| 2003 (55th) | Sabrina the Teenage Witch | "Sabrina in Wonderland" | Julie Kaye Fanton, Scott Heineman | The WB |
| 2003 (55th) | That '70s Show | "The Battle of Evermore" | Garvin Eddy, Tara Stephenson | Fox |
2004 (56th)
| 2004 (56th) | Frasier | "Freudian Sleep," "Caught in the Act" | Roy Christopher, Ron Olsen, Amy Skjonsby-Winslow | NBC |
| 2004 (56th) | Arrested Development | "Pilot" | Ellen Brill, Charisse Cardenas, Denny Dugally | Fox |
| 2004 (56th) | Two and a Half Men | "Alan Harper, Frontier Chiropractor" | John Shaffner, Ann Shea | CBS |
| 2004 (56th) | Whoopi | "Sticky Fingers" | Garvin Eddy, Donna Hamilton, Ellen Waggett | NBC |
| 2004 (56th) | Will & Grace | "I Do, Oh, No, You Di-in't" | Melinda Ritz, Glenda Rovello | NBC |
2005 (57th)
| 2005 (57th) | George Lopez | "Leave It to Lopez," "The Simple Life," "Trouble in Paradise" | Judi Giovanni, John Shaffner | ABC |
| 2005 (57th) | That '70s Show | "Down the Road Apiece," "Angie," "Don't Lie to Me" | Garvin Eddy, Tara Stephenson | Fox |
| 2005 (57th) | Two and a Half Men | "It Was 'Mame,' Mom," "A Low, Guttural Tongue-Flapping Noise" | John Shaffner, Ann Shea | CBS |
| 2005 (57th) | Will & Grace | "The Birds and the Bees" | Melinda Ritz, Glenda Rovello | NBC |
2006 (58th)
| 2006 (58th) | How I Met Your Mother | "Pilot" | Stephan G. Olson, Richard C. Walker | CBS |
| 2006 (58th) | Stacked | "iPod" | Mark Johnson, Bernard Vyzga | Fox |
| 2006 (58th) | Will & Grace | "I Love L. Gay" | Melinda Ritz, Glenda Rovello | NBC |
2007 (59th)
| 2007 (59th) | How I Met Your Mother | "Aldrin Justice," "Something Borrowed," "Something Blue" | Stephan G. Olson, Susan Eschelbach | CBS |
| 2007 (59th) | The Class | "Pilot" | Glenda Rovello, Peter Gurski | CBS |
2008 (60th)
| 2008 (60th) | How I Met Your Mother | "The Yips," "No Tomorrow," "Miracles" | Stephan G. Olson, Susan Eschelbach | CBS |
| 2008 (60th) | The New Adventures of Old Christine | "Between a Rock and a Hard Place," "The New Adventures of Old Christine," "House" | Cabot McMullen, Amy Feldman | CBS |
2009 (61st)
| 2009 (61st) | How I Met Your Mother | "Shelter Island," "Not a Father's Day" | Stephan G. Olson, Susan Eschelbach | CBS |
| 2009 (61st) | The Big Bang Theory | "The Hofstadter Isotope," "The Vegas Renormalization," "The Lizard-Spock Expansion" | John Shaffner, Ann Shea | CBS |
| 2009 (61st) | Hell's Kitchen | "Episode 515" | John Janavs, Robert Frye, Stephen Paul Fackrell | Fox |
| 2009 (61st) | The New Adventures of Old Christine | "What Happens in Vegas Is Disgusting in Vegas," "Guess Who's Not Coming to Dinner," "He Ain't Heavy" | Cabot McMullen, Amy Feldman | CBS |
| 2009 (61st) | Saturday Night Live | "Host: Anne Hathaway," "Host: Hugh Laurie" | Eugene Lee, Akira Yoshimura, Keith Ian Raywood, N. Joseph DeTullio | NBC |

=== 2010s ===
| Year | Program | Episode(s) | Nominees | Network |
|---|---|---|---|---|
2010 (62nd)
| 2010 (62nd) | The Big Bang Theory | "The Gothowitz Deviation," "The Adhesive Duck Deficiency" | John Shaffner, Ann Shea | CBS |
| 2010 (62nd) | Hell's Kitchen | "Episode 615" | John Janavs, Robert Frye, Stephen Paul Fackrell | Fox |
| 2010 (62nd) | How I Met Your Mother | "Duel Citizenship," "Hooked," "Of Course" | Stephan G. Olson, Susan Eschelbach | CBS |
| 2010 (62nd) | The New Adventures of Old Christine | "Subway, Somehow," "Revenge Makeover," "Sweet Charity" | Cabot McMullen, Amy Feldman | CBS |
| 2010 (62nd) | Rules of Engagement | "3rd Wheel," "Ghost Story," "Atlantic City" | Bernard Vyzga, Jerie Kelter | CBS |
2011 (63rd)
| 2011 (63rd) | Hot in Cleveland | "Sisterhood of the Traveling SPANX," "I Love Lucci, Part 2," "LeBron Is Le Gone" | Michael Andrew Hynes, Maralee Zediker | TV Land |
| 2011 (63rd) | The Big Bang Theory | "The Love Car Displacement," "The 21-Second Excitation," "The Agreement Dissection" | John Shaffner, Francoise Cherry-Cohen, Ann Shea | CBS |
| 2011 (63rd) | How I Met Your Mother | "Subway Wars," "Natural History" | Stephan G. Olson, Susan Eschelbach | CBS |
| 2011 (63rd) | Mike & Molly | "Pilot" | John Shaffner, Ann Shea | CBS |
| 2011 (63rd) | Rules of Engagement | "Last of the Red Hat Lovers," "Singing and Dancing," "The Set Up" | Bernard Vyzga, Jerie Kelter | CBS |
2012 (64th)
| 2012 (64th) | 2 Broke Girls | "And the Rich People Problems," "And the Reality Check," "And the Pop Up Sale" | Glenda Rovello, Amy Feldman | CBS |
| 2012 (64th) | Hell's Kitchen | "Episode 915," "Episode 916" | John Janavs, Robert Frye, Heidi Miller | Fox |
| 2012 (64th) | How I Met Your Mother | "Now We're Even," "The Magician's Code" | Stephan G. Olson, Susan Eschelbach | CBS |
| 2012 (64th) | Mike & Molly | "Goin' Fishin'," "Valentine's Piggyback," "The Wedding" | John Shaffner, Lynda Burbank | CBS |
| 2012 (64th) | 30 Rock | "Live from Studio 6H" | Teresa Masterpierro, Keith Ian Raywood, Jennifer Greenberg, Peter Baran | NBC |
2013 (65th)
| 2013 (65th) | MasterChef | "Episode 320" | John Janavs, Robert Frye, Heidi Miller | Fox |
| 2013 (65th) | The Big Bang Theory | "The Date Night Variable," "The Bakersfield Expedition," "The Love Spell Potential" | John Shaffner, Francoise Cherry-Cohen, Ann Shea | CBS |
| 2013 (65th) | How I Met Your Mother | "Farhampton," "P.S. I Love You," "The Final Page, Part 2" | Stephan G. Olson, Susan Eschelbach | CBS |
| 2013 (65th) | Two and a Half Men | "Avoid the Chinese Mustard," "Grab a Feather and Get in Line," "My Bodacious Vidalia" | John Shaffner, Francoise Cherry-Cohen, Ann Shea | CBS |
| 2013 (65th) | 2 Broke Girls | "And the Bear Truth," "And Not So Sweet Charity," "And the Silent Partner" | Glenda Rovello, Amy Feldman | CBS |
| 2014 (66th) | Production Design for a Narrative Program (Half-Hour or Less) | | | |
| 2014 (66th) | House of Lies | "Wreckage" | Ray Yamagata, Chikako Suzuki, Tim Stepeck | Showtime |
| 2014 (66th) | The Big Bang Theory | "The Hofstadter Insufficiency," "The Locomotive Manipulation," "The Proton Transmogrification" | John Shaffner, Francoise Cherry-Cohen, Ann Shea | CBS |
| 2014 (66th) | Modern Family | "Las Vegas" | Claire Bennett, Sam Kramer, Brian Kasch | ABC |
| 2014 (66th) | Silicon Valley | "Articles of Incorporation" | Richard Toyon, L.J. Houdyshell, Cynthia Slagter | HBO |
| 2014 (66th) | Veep | "Clovis" | Jim Gloster, Sharon Davis, Jennifer Engel | HBO |
2015 (67th)
| 2015 (67th) | Silicon Valley | "Sand Hill Shuffle" | Richard Toyon, L.J. Houdyshell, Jenny Mueller | HBO |
| 2015 (67th) | The Big Bang Theory | "The First Pitch Insufficiency," "The Clean Room Infilltration," "The Skywalker Incursion" | John Shaffner, Francoise Cherry-Cohen, Ann Shea | CBS |
| 2015 (67th) | Hot in Cleveland | "Vegas, Baby," "I Hate Goodbyes," "All About Elka" | Michael Andrew Hynes, Maralee Zediker | TV Land |
| 2015 (67th) | Transparent | "The Letting Go" | Cat Smith, Maria Baker, Nya Patrinos | Amazon |
| 2015 (67th) | 2 Broke Girls | "And the Zero Tolerance," "And the Fun Factory," "And a Loan for Christmas" | Glenda Rovello, Amy Feldman | CBS |
| 2015 (67th) | Veep | "Joint Session" | Jim Gloster, E. David Cosier, Jennifer Engel | HBO |
2016 (68th)
| 2016 (68th) | Transparent | "Kina Hora," "The Book of Life," "Man on the Land" | Cat Smith, Macie Vener, Susan Mina Eschelbach | Amazon |
| 2016 (68th) | The Big Bang Theory | "The Positive Negative Reaction," "The Big Bear Precipitation," "The Fermentation Bifurcation" | John Shaffner, Francoise Cherry-Cohen, Ann Shea | CBS |
| 2016 (68th) | The Muppets | "The X Factor," "Pigs in a Blackout," "Single All the Way" | Denise Ann Pizzini, Don Diers | ABC |
| 2016 (68th) | Silicon Valley | "Two in the Box," "Bachmanity Insanity," "Daily Active Users" | Richard Toyon, Oana Bogdan, Jennifer Mueller | HBO |
| 2016 (68th) | Veep | "The Eagle," "C**tgate" | Jim Gloster, Karen Steward, Kimberly Wannop | HBO |
2017 (69th)
| 2017 (69th) | Veep | "Omaha" | Jim Gloster, Andrew Leitch, Kimberly Wannop | HBO |
| 2017 (69th) | The Big Bang Theory | "The Dependence Transcendence" | John Shaffner, Francoise Cherry-Cohen, Ann Shea | CBS |
| 2017 (69th) | Grace and Frankie | "The Burglary," "The Gun" | Devorah Herbert, Ben Edelberg, Christopher Carlson | Netflix |
| 2017 (69th) | Mozart in the Jungle | "Now I Will Sing" | Tommaso Ortino, Susanna Codognato, Letizia Santucci | Amazon |
| 2017 (69th) | Silicon Valley | "Success Failure," "Terms of Service," "Hooli-Con" | Richard Toyon, Jaclyn Hauser, Jennifer Mueller | HBO |
| 2017 (69th) | Transparent | "If I Were a Bell" | Cat Smith, Macie Vener, Dea Johnson | Amazon |
2018 (70th)
| 2018 (70th) | GLOW | "The Dusty Spur" | Todd Fjelsted, Harry Otto, Ryan Watson | Netflix |
| 2018 (70th) | Atlanta | "Teddy Perkins" | Timothy O'Brien, Taylor Mosbey, Aimee Athnos | FX |
| 2018 (70th) | Barry | "Chapter Seven: Loud, Fast and Keep Going" | Tyler B. Robinson, Eric Schoonover, Amber Haley | HBO |
| 2018 (70th) | Grace and Frankie | "The Tappys," "The Landline," "The Home" | Devorah Herbert, Amy Wheeler, Andrea Fenton | Netflix |
| 2018 (70th) | Silicon Valley | "Tech Evangelist," "Artificial Emotional Intelligence" | Richard Toyon, Jaclyn Hauser, Brandi Kalish | HBO |
| 2018 (70th) | Will & Grace | "A Gay Olde Christmas" | Glenda Rovello, Conny Marinos, Peter Gurski | NBC |
2019 (71st)
| 2019 (71st) | Russian Doll | "Nothing in This World Is Easy" | Michael Bricker, John Cox, Jessica Petruccelli | Netflix |
| 2019 (71st) | Barry | "ronny/lily" | Tyler B. Robinson, Eric Schoonover, Rachael Ferrara | HBO |
| 2019 (71st) | Veep | "Veep" | Jim Gloster, Andrew Leitch, Kimberly Wannop, David Smith | HBO |
| 2019 (71st) | Will & Grace | "Jack's Big Gay Wedding" | Glenda Rovello, Conny Marinos, Peter Gurski | NBC |

=== 2020s ===
| Year | Program | Episode(s) | Nominees | Network |
|---|---|---|---|---|
2020 (72nd)
| 2020 (72nd) | The Mandalorian | "Chapter 1: The Mandalorian" | Andrew L. Jones, Jeff Wisniewski, Amanda Serino | Disney+ |
| 2020 (72nd) | GLOW | "Up, Up, Up" | Todd Fjelsted, Valerie Green, Cynthia Slagter | Netflix |
| 2020 (72nd) | Space Force | "The Launch" | Susie Mancini, Gary Warshaw, Rachael Ferrara | Netflix |
| 2020 (72nd) | What We Do in the Shadows | "Resurrection", "Collaboration", "Witches" | Kate Bunch, Aleks Cameron, Shayne Fox | FX |
| 2020 (72nd) | Will & Grace | "We Love Lucy" | Glenda Rovello, Conny Marinos, Peter Gurski | NBC |
2021 (73rd)
| 2021 (73rd) | WandaVision | | Mark Worthington, Sharon Davis, Kathy Orlando | Disney+ |
| 2021 (73rd) | Emily in Paris | "Emily in Paris" | Anne Seibel, Jean-Yves Rabier, Christelle Maisonneuve | Netflix |
| 2021 (73rd) | Hacks | "Primm" | Jon Carlos, James Bolenbaugh, Ellen Reede Dorros | HBO Max |
| 2021 (73rd) | Ted Lasso | "For the Children" | Paul Cripps, Iain White | Apple TV+ |
| 2021 (73rd) | United States of Al | "Pilot" | John Shaffner, Daren Janes, Susan Eschelbach | CBS |
2022 (74th)
| 2022 (74th) | Only Murders in the Building | "True Crime" | Curt Beech, Jordan Jacobs, Rich Murray | Hulu |
| 2022 (74th) | Bob Hearts Abishola | "Bowango" | Francoise Cherry-Cohen, Gail L. Russell, Ann Shea | CBS |
| 2022 (74th) | Emily in Paris | "The Cook, the Thief, Her Ghost and His Lover", "Scents & Sensibility", "French Revolution" | Anne Seibel, Benôit Tételin, Christelle Maisonneuve | Netflix |
| 2022 (74th) | Hacks | "Trust the Process" | Alec Contestabile, Rob Tokarz, Jennifer Lukehart | HBO Max |
| 2022 (74th) | Schmigadoon! | "Schmigadoon!" | Bo Welch, Don Macaulay, Carol Lavallee | Apple TV+ |
| 2022 (74th) | Ted Lasso | "Beard After Hours" | Paul Cripps, Stacey Dickinson | Apple TV+ |
| 2022 (74th) | United States of Al | "Kiss/Maach", "Divorce/Talaq", "Sock/Jeraab" | Daren Janes, Susan Eschelbach | CBS |
2023 (75th)
| 2023 (75th) | Only Murders in the Building | "Sparring Partners", "I Know Who Did It" | Patrick Howe, Jordan Jacobs, Rich Murray | Hulu |
| 2023 (75th) | The Bear | "System" | Sam Lisenco, Eric Dean, Emily Carter | FX |
| 2023 (75th) | How I Met Your Father | "The Reset Button", "Ride or Die", "Daddy" | Glenda Rovello, Conny Boettger-Marinos, Amy Beth Feldman | Hulu |
| 2023 (75th) | Schmigadoon! | "Famous as Hell" | Jamie Walker McCall, Ryan Garton, Gregory Clarke, Carol Lavallee | Apple TV+ |
| 2023 (75th) | What We Do in the Shadows | "The Night Market" | Shayne Fox, Aaron Noël, Kerri Wylie | FX |
2024 (76th)
| 2024 (76th) | Only Murders in the Building | "Opening Night" | Patrick Howe, Casey Smith, Rich Murray | Hulu |
| 2024 (76th) | The Bear | "Omelette" | Merje Veski, Lisa Korpan, Eric Frankel | FX |
| 2024 (76th) | Frasier | "Moving In" | Glenda Rovello, Conny Boettger-Marinos, Amy Feldman | Paramount+ |
| 2024 (76th) | Hacks | "Yes, And" | Rob Tokarz, Jeanine A. Ringer, Jennifer Lukehart | Max |
| 2024 (76th) | What We Do in the Shadows | "A Weekend at Morrigan Manor" | Shayne Fox, Jody Clement, Aaron Noël, Kerri Wylie | FX |
2025 (77th)
| 2025 (77th) | The Studio | "The Note" | Julie Berghoff, Brian Grego, Claire Kaufman | Apple TV+ |
| 2025 (77th) | Hacks | "A Slippery Slope" | Rob Tokarz, Jeanine Ringer, Jennifer Lukehart | HBO Max |
| 2025 (77th) | Mid-Century Modern | "Working Girls" | Greg Grande, Sam Kramer, Peter Gurski | Hulu |
| 2025 (77th) | Only Murders in the Building | "Gates of Heaven", "Valley of the Dolls" | Patrick Howe, Casey Smith, Mila Khalevich | Hulu |
| 2025 (77th) | What We Do in the Shadows | "Headhunting" | Shayne Fox, Hayley Isaacs, Aaron Noël, Kerri Wylie | FX |
2026 (78th)
| 2026 (78th) | Widow's Bay | "Lodging" | Steve Arnold, Peter Borck, Jennifer Engel | Apple TV |
| 2026 (78th) | Hacks | "Who's Making Dinner?" | Rob Tokarz, Jeanine Ringer, Jennifer Lukehart | HBO Max |
| 2026 (78th) | A Knight of the Seven Kingdoms | "Seven" | Tom McCullagh, John Merry, Stephanie Rea | HBO |
| 2026 (78th) | Leanne | "Please Be a Lizard" | Francoise Cherry-Cohen, Gail L. Russell, Ann Shea | Netflix |
| 2026 (78th) | Only Murders in the Building | "The House Always..." | Patrick Howe, Casey Smith, Mila Khalevich | Hulu |

== Programs with multiple wins ==
4 wins

- How I Met Your Mother

3 wins

- Only Murders in the Building
- Will & Grace

== Programs with multiple nominations ==
Totals include nominations for Outstanding Art Direction for a Series.

9 nominations

- Will & Grace

8 nominations

- The Big Bang Theory
- How I Met Your Mother

5 nominations

- Frasier
- Hacks
- Only Murders in the Building
- Silicon Valley
- Veep

4 nominations

- Friends
- What We Do in the Shadows

3 nominations

- Modern Family
- The New Adventures of Old Christine
- Ted Lasso (Note: Total includes Ted Lasso's nomination for Outstanding Production Design for a Narrative Contemporary Program (One Hour or More).)
- That '70s Show
- Transparent
- Two and a Half Men
- 2 Broke Girls

2 nominations

- Barry
- The Bear
- Cybill
- Dharma & Greg
- Emily in Paris
- GLOW
- Grace and Frankie
- Hot in Cleveland
- The Mandalorian (Note: Total includes The Mandalorian's nomination for Outstanding Production Design for a Narrative Period or Fantasy Program (One Hour or More).)
- Maude
- Mike & Molly
- Murphy Brown
- Rules of Engagement
- Schmigadoon!
- United States of Al
