= Art Directors Guild Awards 2021 =

Annual US film and television awards ceremony

26th Art Directors Guild Awards
- Date: March 5, 2022

The 26th Art Directors Guild Excellence in Production Design Awards, honoring the best production designers in film, television and media of 2021, was held on March 5, 2022, at the InterContinental Hotel in Los Angeles, California, United States. The nominations were announced on January 24, 2022.

Denis Villeneuve was awarded with the William Cameron Menzies Award, while Jane Campion received the Cinematic Imagery Award.

== Winners and nominees ==
=== Film ===
Excellence in Production Design for a Contemporary Film	Excellence in Production Design for a Period Film
No Time to Die – Mark Tildesley; Candyman – Cara Brower; Don't Look Up – Clayton Hartley; In the Heights – Nelson Coates; The Lost Daughter – Inbal Weinberg	Nightmare Alley – Tamara Deverell; The French Dispatch – Adam Stockhausen; Licorice Pizza – Florencia Martin; The Tragedy of Macbeth – Stefan Dechant; West Side Story – Adam Stockhausen
Excellence in Production Design for a Fantasy Film	Excellence in Production Design for an Animated Film
Dune – Patrice Vermette; Cruella – Fiona Crombie; Ghostbusters: Afterlife – François Audouy; The Green Knight – Jade Healy; Shang-Chi and the Legend of the Ten Rings – Sue Chan	Encanto – Ian Gooding, Lorelay Bové; Luca – Daniela Strijleva; The Mitchells vs. the Machines – Lindsey Olivares; Raya and the Last Dragon – Paul Felix, Mingjue Helen Chen, Cory Loftis; Sing 2 – Olivier Adam

=== Television ===
Excellence in Production Design for a One-Hour Contemporary Single-Camera Series	Excellence in Production Design for a One-Hour Period or Fantasy Single-Camera Series
Squid Game (Episode: "Gganbu") – Chae Kyoung-sun (Netflix); The Handmaid's Tale (Episode: "Chicago") – Elisabeth Williams (Hulu); The Morning Show (Episodes: "My Least Favorite Year", "It's Like the Flu", "A Private Person") – Nelson Coates (Apple TV+); Succession (Episodes: "The Disruption", "Too Much Birthday") – Stephen Carter (HBO); Yellowstone (Episode: "No Kindness for the Coward") – Cary White (Paramount Network)	Loki (Episode: "Glorious Purpose") – Kasra Farahani (Disney+); Foundation (Episode: "The Emperor's Peace") – Rory Cheyne (Apple TV+); The Great (Episodes: "Dickhead", "Seven Days", "Wedding") – Francesca di Mottola (Hulu); Lost in Space (Episode: "Three Little Birds") – Alec Hammond (Netflix); The Witcher (Episode: "A Grain of Truth") – Andrew Laws (Netflix)
Excellence in Production Design for a Half Hour Single-Camera Television Series	Excellence in Production Design for a Multi-Camera Series
What We Do in the Shadows (Episodes: "The Prisoner", "The Cloak of Duplication", "The Siren") – Kate Bunch (FX); Hacks (Episode: "Primm") – Jon Carlos (HBO Max); Only Murders in the Building (Episode: "True Crime") – Curt Beech (Hulu); Schmigadoon! (Episode: "Schmigadoon!") – Bo Welch (Apple TV+); Ted Lasso (Episodes: "Carol of the Bells", "Man City", "Beard After Hours") – Paul Cripps (Apple TV+)	Family Reunion (Episode: "Remember When M'Dear Changed History?") – Aiyana Trotter (Netflix); Bob Hearts Abishola (Episode: "Bowango") – Francoise Cherry-Cohen (CBS); Call Your Mother (Episode: "Pilot") – Glenda Rovello (ABC); The Conners (Episodes: "A Stomach Ache, a Heartbreak and a Grave Mistake", "An Old Dog, New Tricks and a Ticket to Ride") – John Shaffner (ABC); Punky Brewster (Episode: "Put a Ring on It") – Kristan Andrews (Peacock)
Excellence in Production Design for a Variety, Reality or Competition Series	Excellence in Production Design for a Variety Special
Harry Potter: Hogwarts Tournament of Houses (Episode: "Gryffindor vs. Hufflepuff") – John Janavs (TBS/Cartoon Network); A Black Lady Sketch Show (Episode: "If I'm Paying These Chili's Prices, You Cannot Taste My Steak!") – Cindy Chao, Michele Yu (HBO); RuPaul's Drag Race (Episodes: "Condragulations", "Bossy Rossy Rubot", "Gettin' Lucky") – James McGowan (VH1); Saturday Night Live (Episodes: "Host: Dan Levy + Music: Phoebe Bridgers", "Host: Maya Rudolph + Music: Jack Harlow", "Host: Kim Kardashian West + Music: Halsey") – Keith Raywood, Eugene Lee, Akira Yoshimura, N. Joseph De Tullio (NBC); Waffles + Mochi (Episode: "Tomato") – Cindy Chao, Michele Yu (Netflix)	Live in Front of a Studio Audience (The Facts of Life: 'Kids Can Be Cruel', Diff'rent Strokes: 'Willis' Privacy') – Stephan Olson (ABC); American Express – Unstaged with SZA – Carlos Laszlo; Jim Gaffigan: Comedy Monster – James Kronzer; Savage X Fenty Show Vol. 3 – Steve Morden; Yearly Departed – Frida Oliva
Excellence in Production Design for a Television Movie or Limited Series
WandaVision – Mark Worthington (Disney+); Halston – Mark Ricker (Netflix); Mare of Easttown – Keith P. Cunningham (HBO); The Underground Railroad – Mark Friedberg (Prime Video); The White Lotus – Laura Fox (HBO)

=== Short form ===
Excellence in Production Design for a Commercial	Excellence in Production Design for a Music Video
Apple Music: "Billie Eilish – Happier Than Ever" – François Audouy; Anheuser-Busch Super Bowl LV: "Let's Grab a Beer" – Donald Graham Burt; Apple: "Introducing iPhone 13 Pro" – Dylan Kahn; Apple: "'Saving Simon' Shot on iPhone 13 Pro" – Chelsea Oliver; Gucci: "Aria" – Jeremy Reed; Neom: "Made to Change" – François Audouy	Taylor Swift: All Too Well: The Short Film – Ethan Tobman; Coldplay: "Higher Power" – Patrick Tatopoulos; Coldplay x BTS: "My Universe" – François Audouy; Ed Sheeran: "Shivers" – François Audouy; Pink: "All I Know So Far" – François Audouy

=== William Cameron Menzies Award ===
- Denis Villeneuve

=== Cinematic Imagery Award ===
- Jane Campion
