= Saturn Award for Best Fantasy Television Series =

Annual US television award

- Awarded for: Best television series of the year in the fantasy genre
- Country: United States
- Presented by: Academy of Science Fiction, Fantasy and Horror Films
- First award: 2016
- Currently held by: Outlander (2024/2025)
- Website: www.saturnawards.org

The Saturn Award for Best Fantasy Television Series is one of the annual awards given by the Academy of Science Fiction, Fantasy and Horror Films. The Saturn Awards, which are the oldest film- and television-specialized awards to recognize science fiction, fantasy, and horror achievements, included the category for the first time at the 42nd Saturn Awards ceremony, when the Saturn Award went through major changes in their television categories. It specifically recognizes fantasy on television.

Since the award was introduced in 2015, Outlander was the only series to win until Game of Thrones in 2019. At the 50th Anniversary Saturn Awards, the category was split to recognize both network/cable series and streaming series but was recombined the following year.

== Winners and nominees ==
The winners are listed in bold.

(NOTE: Year refers to year of eligibility, the actual ceremonies are held the following year)

=== 2010s ===
Year	TV Series	Network
2015 **(42nd)**	**Outlander**	**Starz**
2015 **(42nd)**	Game of Thrones	HBO
2015 **(42nd)**	Haven	Syfy
2015 **(42nd)**	Jonathan Strange & Mr Norrell	BBC America
2015 **(42nd)**	The Magicians	Syfy
2015 **(42nd)**	The Muppets	ABC
2015 **(42nd)**	The Shannara Chronicles	MTV
2016 **(43rd)**	**Outlander**	**Starz**
2016 **(43rd)**	Beyond	Freeform
2016 **(43rd)**	Game of Thrones	HBO
2016 **(43rd)**	The Good Place	NBC
2016 **(43rd)**	Lucifer	Fox
2016 **(43rd)**	The Magicians	Syfy
2016 **(43rd)**	Preacher	AMC
2017 **(44th)**	**Outlander**	**Starz**
2017 **(44th)**	American Gods	Starz
2017 **(44th)**	Game of Thrones	HBO
2017 **(44th)**	The Good Place	NBC
2017 **(44th)**	Knightfall	History
2017 **(44th)**	The Librarians	TNT
2017 **(44th)**	The Magicians	Syfy
2018/2019 **(45th)**	**Game of Thrones**	**HBO**
2018/2019 **(45th)**	American Gods	Starz
2018/2019 **(45th)**	Charmed	The CW
2018/2019 **(45th)**	The Good Place	NBC
2018/2019 **(45th)**	Good Witch	Hallmark Channel
2018/2019 **(45th)**	The Magicians	Syfy
2018/2019 **(45th)**	Outlander	Starz
2018/2019 **(45th)**	The Outpost	The CW
2019/2020 **(46th)**	**For All Mankind**	**Apple TV+**
2019/2020 **(46th)**	The Dark Crystal: Age of Resistance	Netflix
2019/2020 **(46th)**	Locke & Key	Netflix
2019/2020 **(46th)**	The Magicians	Syfy
2019/2020 **(46th)**	Outlander	Starz
2019/2020 **(46th)**	The Twilight Zone	CBS All Access
2019/2020 **(46th)**	The Witcher	Netflix

=== 2020s ===
Year	TV Series	Network
2021/2022 **(50th)**	Network / Cable	
2021/2022 **(50th)**	**Shining Vale**	**Starz**
2021/2022 **(50th)**	Doctor Who	BBC America
2021/2022 **(50th)**	Ghosts	CBS
2021/2022 **(50th)**	La Brea	NBC
2021/2022 **(50th)**	Riverdale	The CW
2021/2022 **(50th)**	Stargirl	The CW
2021/2022 **(50th)**	Streaming	
2021/2022 **(50th)**	**Loki**	**Disney+**
2021/2022 **(50th)**	Russian Doll	Netflix
2021/2022 **(50th)**	Schmigadoon!	Apple TV+
2021/2022 **(50th)**	WandaVision	Disney+
2021/2022 **(50th)**	The Wheel of Time	Amazon Prime Video
2021/2022 **(50th)**	The Witcher	Netflix
2022/2023 **(51st)**	**Wednesday**	**Netflix**
2022/2023 **(51st)**	Ghosts	CBS
2022/2023 **(51st)**	Good Omens	Amazon Prime Video
2022/2023 **(51st)**	House of the Dragon	HBO
2022/2023 **(51st)**	The Lord of the Rings: The Rings of Power	Amazon Prime Video
2022/2023 **(51st)**	Mayfair Witches	AMC
2022/2023 **(51st)**	Schmigadoon!	Apple TV+
2023/2024 **(52nd)**	**House of the Dragon**	**Max**
2023/2024 **(52nd)**	Avatar: The Last Airbender	Netflix
2023/2024 **(52nd)**	For All Mankind	Apple TV+
2023/2024 **(52nd)**	The Lord of the Rings: The Rings of Power	Prime Video
2023/2024 **(52nd)**	Percy Jackson and the Olympians	Disney+
2023/2024 **(52nd)**	The Spiderwick Chronicles	The Roku Channel
2024/2025 **(53rd)**	**Outlander**	**Starz**
2024/2025 **(53rd)**	Ghosts	CBS
2024/2025 **(53rd)**	The Librarians: The Next Chapter	TNT
2024/2025 **(53rd)**	Mayfair Witches	AMC
2024/2025 **(53rd)**	Stranger Things	Netflix
2024/2025 **(53rd)**	Wednesday	Netflix

== Most nominations ==
- 5 nominations – The Magicians, Outlander
- 4 nominations – Game of Thrones
- 3 nominations – The Good Place
- 2 nominations – American Gods, Ghosts, Schmigadoon!, The Witcher, House of the Dragon, For All Mankind, The Lord of the Rings: The Rings of Power

== Most wins ==
- 4 wins – Outlander

== See also ==
- Saturn Award for Best Streaming Science Fiction, Action & Fantasy Series
