= Todd Fjelsted =

American production designer and art director

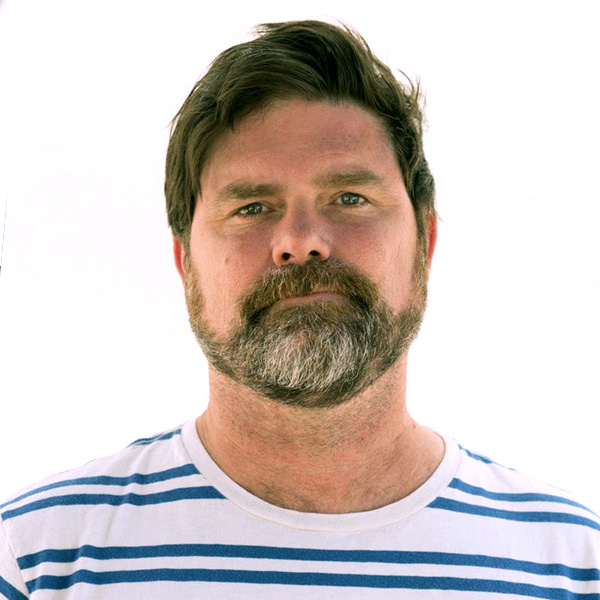
- Born: November 18, 1967 (age 58); Columbus, Ohio, U.S.
- Occupations: Production designer; visual artist; director; writer
- Years active: 2003–present

Todd Fjelsted is an American production designer and visual artist. He is best known for his work on the Netflix series GLOW and Marvel series Helstrom.

== Life and career ==
Fjelsted was born in Columbus, Ohio and grew up in North Carolina. He started his career as a fine artist exhibitor in galleries. In 2003, he wrote and directed the animated short film, The Firefly Man, screened at the Telluride Film Festival. Later, he moved to Los Angeles in 2003 and worked as an art director and production designer. He is a member of the Art Directors Guild.

== Filmography ==
=== Film ===
Year	Title	Contribution	Note
TBA	Beacon 23	Production designer	
2017	Phoenix Forgotten	Production designer	
2015	The Adderall Diaries	Production designer	
2014	White Bird in a Blizzard	Production designer	
2015	Here Now	Production designer	Short film
2013	The Moment	Production designer	
2011	Little Birds	Production designer	
2011	Freak Dance	Production designer	
2010	Magic	Production designer	
2010	Kaboom	Production designer	
2010	Obselidia	Art director	
2008	One-Eyed Monster	Production designer	
2007	Out at the Wedding	Art director	
2006	I'm Reed Fish	Art director	
2006	The Sound of Silence	Production designer	Short film
2005	The 10th Amendment Project	Production designer	
2005	I Love Your Work	Art director	
2004	Yeti Vengeance	Production designer	

=== Television ===
Year	Title	Contribution	Note
2022	Roar	Production designer	7 episodes
2022	The First Lady	Production designer	10 episodes
2020	Helstrom	Production designer	10 episodes
2017-2019	GLOW	Production designer	30 episodes
2019	Now Apocalypse	Production designer	10 episodes
2017	Jean-Claude Van Johnson	Production designer	5 episodes
2016	Chad: An American Boy	Production designer	TV movie
2016	Looking	Production designer	TV movie
2015	Exposed	Production designer	TV movie
2014-2015	Looking	Production designer	18 episodes
2011	Jon Benjamin Has a Van	Production designer	10 episodes
2010	Funny or Die Presents	Art director	2 episodes
2008	Night Writer	Production designer	TV movie
2005	Sports Illustrated Swimsuit Model Search	Art director	TV series documentary
2004	College Hill	Art director	TV series
2004	The Simple Life	Art director	4 episodes
2003	Fraternity Life	Art director	TV series

== Awards and nominations ==
Year	Result	Award	Category	Work	Ref.
2020	Nominated	Primetime Emmy Awards	Outstanding Production Design for a Narrative Program (Half-Hour or Less)	GLOW	
2020	Nominated	Art Directors Guild	Half Hour Single-Camera Television Series	GLOW	
2019	Won	Art Directors Guild	Half Hour Single-Camera Television Series	GLOW	
2018	Won	Art Directors Guild	Half Hour Single-Camera Television Series	GLOW	
2018	Won	Primetime Emmy Awards	Outstanding Production Design for a Narrative Program (Half-Hour or Less)	GLOW	
2003	Won	WorldFest-Houston International Film Festival	Independent Short Subject-Films & Video - Animated	The Firefly Man	
