= Schmigadoon! =

American musical comedy television series

- Also known as: Schmicago! (season 2)
- Genre: Musical comedy
- Created by: Cinco Paul; Ken Daurio
- Directed by: Barry Sonnenfeld; Alice Mathias; Robert Luketic
- Starring: Keegan-Michael Key; Cecily Strong; Fred Armisen; Dove Cameron; Jaime Camil; Kristin Chenoweth; Alan Cumming; Ariana DeBose; Ann Harada; Jane Krakowski; Martin Short; Aaron Tveit; Tituss Burgess; Patrick Page
- Music by: Christopher Willis; Cinco Paul (songs)
- Country of origin: United States
- Original language: English
- No. of seasons: 2
- No. of episodes: 12

Production
- Executive producers: Cinco Paul; Lorne Michaels; Barry Sonnenfeld (season 1); Andrew Singer; Micah Frank (season 2)
- Producers: Cecily Strong; Caroline Maroney; Micah Frank (2021); Rose Lam
- Production locations: Vancouver, British Columbia
- Running time: 25–34 minutes
- Production companies: Broadway Video; Out of Cinc; Universal Television

Original release
- Network: Apple TV+
- Release: July 16, 2021 – May 3, 2023

Schmigadoon! is an American musical comedy television series created by Cinco Paul and Ken Daurio, with all songs written by Paul, who also serves as showrunner. The Apple TV+ series premiered July 16, 2021, starring an ensemble cast led by Cecily Strong and Keegan-Michael Key. The story centers around a couple from New York, both doctors, who become trapped in magical musical theatre settings and learn lessons about love and happiness.

Blending satire and homage, Schmigadoon! alludes to numerous musicals in a pastiche of plots and song styles. The first season, set in the bucolic small town of Schmigadoon, blends elements of various Golden Age musicals of the 1940s and '50s, while the second season relocates the action to the gritty city of Schmicago and incorporates the darker, edgier themes of 1960s and '70s musicals.

Barry Sonnenfeld directed the first season, with choreography by Christopher Gattelli, and Cinco Paul won the Primetime Emmy Award for Outstanding Original Music and Lyrics for the song "Corn Puddin'", featured in the pilot episode. The second season premiered April 5, 2023, directed by Alice Mathias and Robert Luketic, with Gattelli's choreography.

The series was not renewed for a third season. A stage adaptation written by Paul premiered at the Kennedy Center in 2025 and opened on Broadway in 2026, winning four Tony Awards including Best Musical.

== Background ==
Cinco Paul had the idea for the show over 20 years before the series premiered, that it would be funny if two men, like the backpackers in An American Werewolf In London, stumbled upon a musical, instead of a horror story. According to Paul, the concept only fully came into focus for him when it changed to "a couple who are stuck there until they can find true love". Paul said that even though Schmigadoon!'s season 1 musical style, characters, and satire are largely based on 1940s and 1950s musicals, the sets and costumes reflect 1910s America, like the setting in The Music Man.

== Premise ==
In the first season, two New York doctors, Melissa and Josh, go on a backpacking trip in an attempt to patch up their failing relationship, only to find themselves still arguing. They get lost and soon discover a magical town called Schmigadoon, which is perpetually trapped in a Golden Age–style musical, and soon learn that they cannot leave the town until they find "true love". The title and concept parody the 1947 musical Brigadoon.

In the second season, Melissa and Josh, now married, find their lives monotonous as doctors in New York City; they search for the quaint village of Schmigadoon but instead arrive in Schmicago, a world that pays satirical homage to sexy, dark 1960s and 1970s musicals; to escape, they are told, they must reach a happy ending. The name of the setting parodies the 1975 musical Chicago. As in the first season, the last episode reaches beyond the time period of the rest of season 2 to reference later musical styles.

== Cast and characters ==
=== Main ===
Cast member	Character and capacity per season	
Cast member	Schmigadoon!	Schmicago!
Keegan-Michael Key	Josh Skinner	Josh Skinner
Cecily Strong	Melissa Gimble	Melissa Gimble
Fred Armisen	Rev. Howard Layton	
Dove Cameron	Betsy McDonough	Jenny Banks
Jaime Camil	Doc Jorge Lopez	Sgt. Rivera
Kristin Chenoweth	Mildred Layton	Miss Codwell
Alan Cumming	Mayor Aloysius Menlove	Dooley Blight
Ariana DeBose	Emma Tate	Emcee
Ann Harada	Florence Menlove	Madam Frau
Jane Krakowski	Countess Von Blerkom	Bobby Flanagan
Martin Short	Oscar, the Leprechaun	Oscar and Stephen, the Leprechauns
Aaron Tveit	Danny Bailey	Topher
Tituss Burgess		The Narrator
Patrick Page		Octavius Kratt

- Keegan-Michael Key as Josh Skinner, an orthopedic surgeon from New York City and Melissa's boyfriend, later husband
- Cecily Strong as Melissa Gimble, an OBGYN doctor from New York and Josh's girlfriend, later wife
- Fred Armisen as Reverend Howard Layton, long-suffering husband of Mildred and leader of the Methodist church in Schmigadoon (season 1)
- Dove Cameron as
  - Betsy McDonough, a waitress, one of Farmer McDonough's seven daughters, inspired by Ado Annie from Oklahoma! (season 1)
  - Jenny Banks, a cabaret performer inspired by Liza Minnelli's portrayal of Sally Bowles in the film adaptation of Cabaret, combined with elements of Johanna from Sweeney Todd: The Demon Barber of Fleet Street (season 2)
- Jaime Camil as
  - Doc Jorge Lopez, a judgmental doctor, set in his ways, inspired by Captain von Trapp from The Sound of Music (season 1)
  - Sergeant Rivera, Schmicago's chief of police, who is the nephew of Octavius Kratt and can be compared to Sweeney Todd's Beadle Bamford; he later parodies Dr. Frank-N-Furter from The Rocky Horror Show (season 2)
- Kristin Chenoweth as
  - Mildred Layton, preacher's wife and the town's self-appointed moral arbiter, whose great-great-grandfather founded Schmigadoon, based mainly on Mrs. Shinn from The Music Man (season 1)
  - Miss Codwell, the owner of an orphanage, combining elements of Mrs. Lovett from Sweeney Todd: The Demon Barber of Fleet Street and Miss Hannigan from Annie (season 2)
- Alan Cumming as
  - Mayor Aloysius Menlove, the closeted gay mayor of Schmigadoon (season 1)
  - Dooley Blight, a butcher and Jenny Banks' father; based on the title character of Sweeney Todd: The Demon Barber of Fleet Street (season 2)
- Ariana DeBose as
  - Emma Tate, Schmigadoon's schoolmarm, based on Marian Paroo from The Music Man (season 1)
  - Emcee, Master of Ceremonies at the Kratt Klub, a send up of the same character from Cabaret (season 2)
- Ann Harada as
  - Florence Menlove, the mayor's adoring but sexually frustrated wife (season 1)
  - Madam Frau, who runs the Hotel Schmicago, a house of prostitution, and the Kratt Klubb; based partly on Fräulein Schneider from Cabaret (season 2)
- Jane Krakowski as
  - Countess Gabriele Von Blerkom, Doc Lopez's fiancée, a rich, elegant woman, based on the Baroness from The Sound of Music (season 1)
  - Bobby Flanagan, a lawyer, based on Billy Flynn from Chicago and a nod to the female "Bobbie" in the 2018 and 2021 revivals of Company (season 2)
- Martin Short as Leprechaun, a magical imp based on Og from Finian's Rainbow; Short appears as The Leprechaun (Steve) in both seasons, as well as his brother (Oscar), in season 2.
- Aaron Tveit as
  - Danny Bailey, the town's rapscallion, a carnival barker, based on Billy Bigelow from Carousel (season 1)
  - Topher, leader of a tribe of hippies, combining elements of leading characters from Pippin, Godspell, Jesus Christ Superstar and Hair (season 2)
- Tituss Burgess as the Narrator, inspired by the Leading Player from Pippin (season 2)
- Patrick Page as Octavius Kratt, the sinister owner of the Kratt Klubb and Schmicago's electric station, reminiscent of Judge Turpin from Sweeney Todd, Caiaphas in Jesus Christ Superstar and Page's previous villain roles, such as Hades in Hadestown (season 2)

=== Co-starring ===
- Liam Quiring-Nkindi as Carson, a boy with a lisp, who announces scene changes; Emma says that Carson is her kid brother, but it turns out that he is her son. He is based on Winthrop Paroo from The Music Man. (season 1)

=== Guest ===
==== Multiple seasons ====
- Kevin McNulty as
  - Farmer McDonough, Betsy's violent father (season 1)
  - Father Flanagan (season 2)
- Darcey Johnson as
  - Innkeeper Harvey (season 1)
  - Reporter (season 2)
- Scott Patey as
  - Larry the Fireman (season 1)
  - Reporter (season 2)
- Amitai Marmorstein as
  - Pete, the cheerful Milkman, who is often the subject of offscreen violence in a running gag (season 1);
  - Skeet the jury foreman/hot dog man (season 2)
- Timothy Webber as Marv
- Bijou Brattston as
  - Tootie McDonough, one of Farmer McDonough's seven daughters (season 1);
  - An orphan (season 2)

==== Season 1 ====
- Peppermint as Madam Vina
- Kyra Leroux as Carrie, one of Farmer McDonough's seven daughters
- Pedro Salvin as Old Doc Lopez, Doc Lopez's father
- Michelle Rios as Mrs. Lopez, Doc Lopez's mother
- Garfield Wilson as Henry the Iceman
- Cassandra Consiglio as Nancy, Freddy's pregnant girlfriend; she is later revealed to be the Laytons' daughter.
- Alex Barima as Freddy, a sailor, Nancy's boyfriend

==== Season 2 ====
- Karin Konoval as Female Barfly, who emphasizes statements with "I'll drink to that!", in reference to Joanne from Company
- Alex Gullason, Marisa Gold and Michael Delleva, three of Topher's hippie friends (each credited under their own first names); Gullason previously appeared in the season one episode "Cross That Bridge"
- Isabel Birch, Kairo Ellis, and Milana Wan as the Orphans
- Jacqueline and Joyce Robbins as the Bernstein sisters, performers at the Kratt Klubb. The name may be a reference to Leonard Bernstein.

== Episodes ==
Season	Episodes	Originally released	
Season	Episodes	First released	Last released
1	6	July 16, 2021	August 13, 2021
2	6	April 5, 2023	May 3, 2023

=== Season 1 (2021) ===
No. overall	No. in season	Title	Directed by	Written by	Original release date
1	1	"Schmigadoon!"	Barry Sonnenfeld	Cinco Paul & Ken Daurio	July 16, 2021
Melissa Gimble and Josh Skinner, doctors in New York City, meet when kicking a hospital vending machine gives them all the candy in the machine. Four years later, their relationship has become strained, so they go on a backpacking retreat to shore it up. They become lost in the woods and cross a stone bridge through the mist to find a seemingly idyllic town, reminiscent of River City, called Schmigadoon, where everyone acts like they are in a musical from the 1940s and 1950s. Melissa plays along, since she is a fan of musicals, but Josh does not like it. Melissa also takes a liking to Danny Bailey, a carnival barker, like Billy Bigelow. The next morning, Melissa and Josh discover that they cannot leave the town. A leprechaun tells them that they cannot leave Schmigadoon until they find "true love".
2	2	"Lovers' Spat"	Barry Sonnenfeld	Cinco Paul & Ken Daurio and Julie Klausner	July 16, 2021
Immediately after discovering they cannot leave Schmigadoon, Melissa and Josh get into an argument, not helped at all by the singing townspeople, which ends in them breaking up. Melissa goes on a walk where she finds Schmigadoon's Mayor Aloysius Menlove, who cheers her up with a song heavily implying that he is in the closet. Meanwhile, Josh becomes interested in flirtatious young waitress Betsy, who offers her picnic basket at the auction later. During the auction, Melissa becomes intoxicated on spiked punch, and Josh wins Betsy. Melissa auctions herself off and is won by Danny. Later that evening, Josh becomes uncomfortable because Betsy appears to be a minor. The evening is cut short by Betsy's father and his shotgun.
3	3	"Cross That Bridge"	Barry Sonnenfeld	Julie Klausner and Bowen Yang	July 23, 2021
The next morning, Melissa wakes up to find Danny making her breakfast. But she sees him as a one-night stand and leaves while he is still soliloquizing about his future offspring. Meanwhile, Josh is quickly engaged to Betsy. Mildred Layton has Josh and Melissa banned from the inn because of her prejudices against them. Josh attempts to cross the bridge with Betsy to see if she is his true love, but he fails, so he tries again with other women, to no avail. Melissa seeks help from the Mayor's wife, who implies that she is frustrated by her husband's sexual orientation. Farmer McDonough chases Josh, who seeks sanctuary in Reverend Layton's church. Inside, he notices Emma Tate, Schmigadoon's schoolmarm, who did not cross the bridge with him. Melissa asks Doc Lopez for a job as a nurse and is instantly smitten with him.
4	4	"Suddenly"	Barry Sonnenfeld	Cinco Paul & Ken Daurio and Kate Gersten	July 30, 2021
In a flashback, Josh and Melissa flee an Off-off-Broadway play that their friend is starring in; they express their love for each other. In Schmigadoon, Josh becomes Emma's new handyman in exchange for lodging; she is stern but encourages him to believe in himself. She also saves him from Betsy's father. Melissa starts work as a nurse, but Lopez is tyrannical and conservative. He refuses to assist Nancy, a pregnant young woman, and her boyfriend, so Melissa gives them a sex-education lesson; she and Josh help to deliver the baby. Mayor Menlove shares a romantic moment with Reverend Layton at the bake sale and later comes out to the townsfolk. Reflecting on this and his growing respect for Melissa, Lopez softens his absolutist outlook and declares his love for her, while Emma admits her love for Josh after he kindly aids her lisping little brother's confidence.
5	5	"Tribulation"	Barry Sonnenfeld	Allison Silverman	August 6, 2021
In a flashback, Josh is passed over for a fellowship. Melissa comforts him, but he mocks her for a misspoken cliché, apologizing that night. In Schmigadoon, Mildred incites a moral panic against the "strangers" and announces her candidacy for mayor. Meanwhile, Lopez's glamorous fiancée, Countess Gabrielle von Blerkom, returns unexpectedly from the city. Melissa expects the Countess to graciously step aside, as in The Sound of Music, but instead she takes Melissa for a drive and abandons her at gunpoint in the countryside. Melissa discovers that the symbolic heart she thought Josh lost had been in her backpack all along; she dismisses a dream ballet in its opening moments. Emma confides in Josh that she is Carson's mother and that her parents disowned her for becoming pregnant out of wedlock. Carson overhears and runs off. Josh searches for him in the woods, where Danny ambushes Josh and knocks him to the ground, where Josh finds the symbolic heart that Melissa threw across the lake.
6	6	"How We Change"	Barry Sonnenfeld	Cinco Paul & Ken Daurio	August 13, 2021
Josh finds Carson and they discuss how good relationships take work. Emma arrives and proposes that she and Carson cross the bridge to start a life with Josh. Lopez retrieves Melissa, declaring that he has chosen her over the Countess, but she wants to save her relationship with Josh. Meanwhile, Josh realizes that he wants the same thing. In town, Mildred is about to win the election. Melissa arrives, followed by Josh, interrupting the vote. She apologizes for their breakup, and he offers his love in song. The two dance together and kiss. Mildred denounces the New Yorkers, but Emma says that they have taught the townspeople to accept their true selves. Emma announces that she is Carson's mom, and other townspeople reveal long-held secrets; for example, Mildred is Nancy's mother, and Rev. Layton has feelings for Mayor Menlove. Mildred throws a tantrum and the Mayor is reelected in a landslide. Melissa tells Mildred that it is not too late to change, and the town celebrates its progress with more modern musical stylings. Hand in hand, Josh and Melissa step onto the bridge, but it is not revealed whether they are able to leave Schmigadoon.

=== Season 2 (2023) ===
No. overall	No. in season	Title	Directed by	Written by	Original release date
7	1	"Welcome to Schmicago"	Alice Mathias	Cinco Paul	April 5, 2023
Josh and Melissa found true love and were able to leave Schmigadoon. They return to their medical practices, get married and buy a house, but their lives become lackluster, and their attempts to have a child fail. They return to the woods looking for Schmigadoon to regain their happiness but have no luck. On a foggy bridge, their car gets a flat tire and they end up in Schmicago, another magical place that echoes the musicals of the 1960s and 1970s, with which Melissa is less familiar. They are welcomed by a sardonic Narrator and some of the people they recognize from Schmigadoon, who have assumed different personas and do not remember Josh and Melissa or Schmigadoon. After finding a place to stay at a seedy hotel, they go to a cabaret. Josh accidentally enters a dressing room to find one of the dancers, Elsie Vale, dead. He and Melissa attempt to drive away, but the Leprechaun has disabled their car and explains that they cannot leave until their relationship reaches a happy ending. Josh is arrested for the murder of Elsie Vale.
8	2	"Doorway to Where"	Alice Mathias	Jonathan Tolins	April 5, 2023
Josh meets his cell mate, Topher, a hippie who wants to find his purpose in life. Melissa hires Bobby Flanagan as Josh's lawyer, who suggests that Melissa go undercover as a dancer at the cabaret to find the real killer. After an audition process reminiscent of that in A Chorus Line, Melissa, despite being not as skinny or as skillful a dancer as the other girls is selected for the part by club owner Octavius Kratt, and she becomes roommates with the friendly star dancer, Jenny Banks. Josh's press conference with Bobby ends in disaster, as everyone still thinks he killed Elsie Vale and will get the chair. Topher's hippie friends bust him and Josh out of jail, and they party on the Happiness Bus. Meanwhile, Melissa and the dancers celebrate her opening night at the cabaret. She then finds a clue about Quick Street in Elsie's date book, which she hopes will lead to information about Elsie's murder.
9	3	"Bells and Whistles"	Alice Mathias	Julie Klausner	April 12, 2023
Topher and his hippie tribe take Josh to their commune for a hippie communion. After Bobby tells Melissa of her husband's jail break, Melissa follows the clue to Quick Street and meets Miss Codwell, the owner of the orphanage (she offers to sell the "brats"), and Dooley Blight, a butcher who was recently released from prison. She learns that Dooley is Jenny's father and was convicted of the murder of his wife, who was really murdered by Octavius Kratt; Dooley wants revenge. Melissa finds and retrieves Josh in time for his trial. Bobby swings into court to deliver a fast-paced, razzle-dazzling defense, and Josh is acquitted. He and Melissa hope this is their happy ending so that they can leave Schmicago, but Kratt, who admits privately to murdering Elsie, now plots to marry Melissa and eliminate Josh.
10	4	"Something Real"	Alice Mathias	Raina Morris	April 19, 2023
Josh and Melissa attempt to cross the bridge but are unable to leave Schmicago. Prompted by the Narrator's hints, they speculate that this is because they need to help make others in Schmicago happy. They start by attempting to reunite Jenny with her father, Dooley, but she believes that he killed her mother and refuses to speak to him. They bring her to meet the hippie tribe, hoping that their ethos of forgiveness will rub off on her, and Josh makes up a "parable" about a girl who forgives her father, but Jenny becomes romantically interested in Topher. Seeing how happy this romance makes Jenny and Topher, Josh and Melissa take Dooley and Miss Codwell on a double date at the Kratt Klubb. This begins awkwardly, but the two finally hit it off, and Dooley goes up to Miss Codwell's orphanage for a nightcap. When they open up to each other, they realize that they can solve their problems by making the orphans into meat products.
11	5	"Famous as Hell"	Robert Luketic	Josh Lieb	April 26, 2023
With Jenny and Topher spending time together, Melissa takes over as the headliner at the cabaret, and Josh becomes the new leader of the tribe. The two begin reveling in their fame, but Jenny and Topher feel betrayed and evict the couple from Jenny's apartment. Josh and Melissa move in with Dooley and Miss Codwell, who have been feeding the orphans to fatten them up, and uncover the plot of making the orphans into sausages. Realizing that Dooley is transferring his anger at Kratt onto the orphans, they instead offer to get Dooley alone with Kratt in Melissa's dressing room. Sgt. Rivera and Madame Frau reflect that life does not always turn out as planned. Melissa flirts with Kratt and attempts to lure him to her dressing room, but he instead forces her into his car and drives away. Rivera holds Josh at gunpoint at the club as Kratt proposes to Melissa, threatening to kill Josh if she does not agree.
12	6	"Over and Done"	Robert Luketic	Cinco Paul	May 3, 2023
Melissa is about to be married to Kratt (the Narrator officiates; Bobbie handles the legal paperwork), and Josh is tied up in Kratt's power plant. Kratt instructs Rivera to kill Josh, but Josh stalls by regaling Rivera with "parables" based on his favorite movies. Dooley determines to rescue Josh, as do Topher and Jenny, with help from the tribe. They arrive, and Jenny is reunited with her father after Rivera admits that he framed Dooley for the murder of his wife. They all attempt to stop the wedding. Dooley throws his cleaver at Kratt, but it misses, pinning Kratt's tuxedo tail to the floor. Miss Codwell releases a chandelier that falls, killing Kratt. Madame Frau takes over the cabaret, where Rivera becomes a drag performer, and the now-business-minded tribe, aided by Bobbie, help to run Kratt's empire. Jenny and Topher run the orphanage, and Miss Codwell works with Dooley at the shop. Josh and Melissa are free to go, but the Narrator and the Schmicagoans tempt them to stay. The doctors explain that they want "Something Real". Leprechaun (Stephen) and his brother (Oscar) reveal that there are no "happy endings", but every day can be a "happy beginning". Back in New York, Josh cheerfully teaches medical students, and Melissa is finally pregnant.

== Production ==
It was announced in January 2020 that Cecily Strong was set to star in and produce the series, with a series order at Apple TV+ close to finalizing. In October, Keegan-Michael Key, Alan Cumming, Fred Armisen, Kristin Chenoweth, Aaron Tveit, Dove Cameron, Ariana DeBose, Jaime Camil, Jane Krakowski and Ann Harada were added to the cast.

Barry Sonnenfeld directed the season and also executive produced. Besides starring, Cecily Strong served as producer, and Ken Daurio served as consulting producer and writer. Andrew Singer also executive produces with Lorne Michaels on behalf of Broadway Video. The musical numbers were choreographed by Christopher Gattelli. In addition to Paul and Daurio, Allison Silverman, Julie Klausner, Kate Gersten and Bowen Yang were writers on the show. The first season was written in the summer of 2019. The season consisted of six episodes, although it was originally planned to be eight episodes. Bo Welch serves as the series' production designer. Filming for season 1 began in Vancouver on October 13, 2020, and concluded on December 10, taking place during the COVID-19 pandemic.

Logo for the second season of Schmigadoon!

The series' second season consists of six episodes, with all of the main cast returning except for Armisen and Quiring-Nkindi; Tituss Burgess and Patrick Page joined the cast. Alice Mathias and Robert Luketic directed. By June 2022 filming of season 2 had begun, and it was completed in July 2022. The second season writers included Paul, Josh Lieb, Jonathan Tolins, Raina Morris and Klausner.

On January 18, 2024, Apple announced that it would not pick up the series for a third season. Paul posted on his social media that he had written the new season's episodes and songs, and he stated: "[T]he optimist in me is convinced it's not the end of Schmigadoon!". The season would have been titled Into the Schmoods, a play on Into the Woods, and would have parodied that musical as well as Cats, Les Miserables, The Phantom of the Opera and other stage and film musicals of the 1980s and 1990s. Paul said that Apple owns the scripts, but he owns the songs to the six episodes written for the third season.

=== Music ===
==== Season 1 ====
Cinco Paul wrote all of the original songs, and the underscore was composed by Christopher Willis. Soundtrack albums for the first season were released by Milan Records as each episode was released.

Schmigadoon! (Apple TV+ Original Series Soundtrack) track listing
No.	Title	Artist(s)	Length
1.	"Schmigadoon!"	Cast of Schmigadoon!; Alan Cumming; Kristin Chenoweth	4:12
2.	"You Can't Tame Me"	Aaron Tveit	3:23
3.	"Corn Puddin'"	Cecily Strong; Cast of Schmigadoon!	1:45
4.	"Leprechaun Song"	Martin Short	0:42
5.	"Lovers' Spat"	Cast of Schmigadoon!; Chenoweth	3:40
6.	"Somewhere Love Is Waiting for You"	Cumming	1:53
7.	"Enjoy the Ride (Part I)"	Strong; Tveit	2:24
8.	"Enjoy the Ride (Part II)"	Dove Cameron; Strong; Tveit	1:50
9.	"To the Right, to the Left"	Paul	0:52
10.	"You Done Tamed Me"	Tveit	1:55
11.	"He's a Queer One, That Man o' Mine"	Ann Harada	2:19
12.	"Cross That Bridge"	Cast of Schmigadoon!	2:37
13.	"Enjoy the Ride (Reprise)"	Strong	0:30
14.	"With All of Your Heart"	Ariana DeBose, The Kids of Schmigadoon	3:46
15.	"Va-Gi-Na"	Strong, Cassandra Consiglio, Alex Barima	1:18
16.	"Somewhere Love Is Waiting for You (Coming Out Reprise)"	Cumming	0:37
17.	"Suddenly"	Jaime Camil; DeBose	3:16
18.	"Suddenly (Melissa Reprise)"	Strong; Camil	1:17
19.	"Tribulation"	Chenoweth; Cast of Schmigadoon!	3:59
20.	"I Always, Always, Never Get My Man"	Jane Krakowski	1:41
21.	"You Make Me Wanna Sing"	Keegan-Michael Key; Strong	3:37
22.	"How We Change/Finale"	The Cast of Schmigadoon!	1:14
23.	"Schmigadoon! Main Title"	Cinco Paul	1:14
24.	"Score: "Just one kick and apparently magic?""	Christopher Willis	2:19
25.	"Score: "See you at seven.""	Willis	2:01
26.	"Score: "It's like a trick bridge or something.""	Willis	1:08
27.	"Score: "Have you been crying?""	Willis	0:43
28.	"Score: "It's the Picnic Basket Auction!""	Willis	0:37
29.	"Score: "Oh, Betsy...""	Willis	1:02
30.	"Score: "That is the most beautiful thing that I've ever heard.""	Willis	0:32
31.	"Score: "She told Poppa!""	Willis	0:35
32.	"Score: "Can I tempt you with anything?""	Willis	0:35
33.	"Score: "You were amazing.""	Willis	0:35
34.	"Score: "It'th raithin' bread!""	Willis	0:38
35.	"Score: "I want Jorge!""	Willis	0:52
36.	"Score: "It wasn't meant to happen.""	Willis	1:08
37.	"Score: "That's for stealin' my gal.""	Willis	0:59
38.	"Score: "It's a tent!""	Willis	1:26
39.	"Score: "I'm so glad I found you.""	Willis	1:07
40.	"Score: "You want to give it to someone else.""	Willis	0:51
41.	"Score: "You go, Harvey!""	Willis	0:53
Total length:			60:11

==== Season 2 ====
Paul and Willis returned to write the original songs and underscoring, respectively, for season 2. Due to licensing issues, the album was released all at once on May 3, 2023, following the finale, as opposed to weekly releases.

Schmigadoon! (Apple TV+ Original Series Soundtrack) track listing
No.	Title	Artist(s)	Length
1.	"Schmigadoon! Season 2 Main Title"	Cinco Paul	0:31
2.	"Welcome to Schmicago"	Tituss Burgess; Dove Cameron; Alan Cumming; Jaime Camil; Kristin Chenoweth; Jane Krakowski; Patrick Page; Cast of Schmigadoon!	3:18
3.	"Do We Shock You?"	Cast of Schmigadoon!; Ericka Hunter, Justine Louise Gera & Sharona D’Ornellas	2:39
4.	"Kaput"	Cameron; Cast of Schmigadoon!	2:37
5.	"Leprechaun Song #2"	Martin Short	0:36
6.	"Doorway to Where"	Aaron Tveit	2:10
7.	"I Need to Eat"	Cecily Strong; Cast of Schmigadoon!	4:25
8.	"Bobby's Vamp (Prison Reprise)"	Cast of Schmigadoon!	1:21
9.	"Bustin' Out"	Cameron; Ariana DeBose; Strong	2:40
10.	"Everyone's Gotta Get Naked"	Tveit; Keegan-Michael Key; Michael Delleva, Alex Gullason, Marisa Gold; Cast of Schmigadoon!	2:36
11.	"The Worst Brats in Town"	Chenoweth	1:24
12.	"The Worst Brats in Town (Dooley's Reprise)"	Cumming	0:34
13.	"There Was a Butcher"	Cumming	1:45
14.	"Bells and Whistles"	Krakowski	3:01
15.	"Two Birds with One Stone"	Page; Burgess	2:08
16.	"Why Are You Hassling Me?"	Tveit	0:34
17.	"Talk to Daddy"	Key; Strong; Cast of Schmigadoon!	3:22
18.	"Something Real"	Cameron; Tveit	3:11
19.	"Good Enough to Eat"	Chenoweth; Cumming; The Orphans of Schmigadoon!	4:08
20.	"Welcome to Schmicago (Reprise)"	Burgess	1:22
21.	"Maybe It's My Turn Now"	Strong	2:48
22.	"Famous as Hell"	Burgess; Cameron; Tveit; Chenoweth; Cumming; Page; Karin Konoval; Cast of Schmigadoon!	3:26
23.	"You Betrayed Me"	Tveit; Key; Cameron	1:27
24.	"There's Always a Twist"	Ann Harada; Camil; Paula Leggett Chase, Leah Horowitz & Shayna Steele	2:21
25.	"Over and Done"	DeBose; Phoenix Best, Cassondra James Kellam & Shayna Steele	3:15
26.	"Something Real (Reprise)"	Strong; Key	2:02
27.	"A Happy Beginning"	Cast of Schmigadoon!; Short; Key; Strong	4:01
Total length:			60:03

== Release ==
A trailer for the series was released on June 25, 2021. The first two episodes aired on Apple TV+ on July 16, followed by one new episode each subsequent Friday until season 1 ended with episode 6 on August 13, 2021.

The first two episodes of the second season premiered on April 5, with episodes continuing to be released weekly until May 3, 2023.

== Reception ==
On review aggregator website Rotten Tomatoes, season 1 of Schmigadoon! holds an approval rating of 89% based on 79 reviews, with an average rating of 7.4/10. The site's critical consensus reads, "Schmigadoon!'s clever inside-theater jokes may not be for everyone, but there's no denying the joy of seeing this talented ensemble sing (and dance!) their hearts out." On Metacritic, which uses a weighted average, the series has a score of 77 out of 100 based on 48 critics, indicating "generally favorable reviews". In The Boston Globe, Matthew Gilbert noted the show's "underlying affection for musical theater [though it] makes ruthless fun of the conventions of show tunes. ... There is plenty of snark afoot. But the songs are also wittily written, and catchy. The choreography is top-notch and well-shot. And the cast members ... have an infectious enthusiasm."

The second season of Schmigadoon! was met with critical acclaim. On Rotten Tomatoes, the second season holds an approval rating of 97% based on 34 reviews, with an average rating of 8.7/10. The site's critical consensus reads, "Schmigadoon! returns with more libido, pizzazz, and all the jazz in a sophomore season that improves upon what was already a nifty production." On Metacritic, the second season has a score of 86 out of 100 based on 12 critics, indicating "universal acclaim". Kelly Lawler, writing in USA Today, called the season "an even more enjoyable affair with better music and a cheekily absurdist tone that makes the series just silly enough to be serious". In The Washington Post, Peter Marks wrote, "The cockeyed genius of the series ... is finding profundity in parody."

A review of both seasons in Collider calls it "Apple TV+'s Most Underrated Show". Julia Glassman wrote in The Mary Sue: "The music and storytelling play off each other in perfect balance." Tributes to the show have included a live performance presented at 54 Below titled "54 Sings Schmigadoon!" in September 2023.

=== Accolades ===
Among other accolades, the first season of the series was nominated for four Emmy Awards, winning one. The soundtrack to Episode 1 was nominated for the Grammy Award for Best Compilation Soundtrack for Visual Media, and Chenoweth was nominated for a Critics' Choice Television Award for Best Supporting Actress in a Comedy Series. The season, its writers, Key, DeBose and Chenoweth were all nominated for Hollywood Critics Association TV Awards. The season was also nominated for the Saturn Award for Best Streaming Fantasy Television Series.

Among accolades for the show's second season were three nominations for Emmy Awards and three nominations for Hollywood Critics Association TV Awards. The award ceremonies for these honors were delayed due to the 2023 Hollywood labor disputes, and both organizations plan to present their awards in January 2024. The season was also nominated for the Saturn Award for Best Fantasy Television Series.

Year	Award	Category	Nominee(s)	Result	Ref.
2022	Art Directors Guild Awards	Excellence in Production Design for a Half Hour Single-Camera Television Series	Bo Welch (for "Schmigadoon!")	Nominated	
2022	Critics' Choice Television Awards	Best Supporting Actress in a Comedy Series	Kristin Chenoweth	Nominated	
2022	Golden Reel Awards	Outstanding Achievement in Sound Editing – 1/2 Hour – Comedy or Drama	Cormac Funge, Peter Nichols and John Green (for "Suddenly")	Nominated	
2022	Grammy Awards	Best Compilation Soundtrack for Visual Media	Schmigadoon! Episode 1	Nominated	
2022	Hollywood Critics Association TV Awards	Best Streaming Series, Comedy	Schmigadoon!	Nominated	
2022	Hollywood Critics Association TV Awards	Best Actor in a Streaming Series, Comedy	Keegan-Michael Key	Nominated	
2022	Hollywood Critics Association TV Awards	Best Supporting Actress in a Streaming Series, Comedy	Kristin Chenoweth	Nominated	
2022	Hollywood Critics Association TV Awards	Best Supporting Actress in a Streaming Series, Comedy	Ariana DeBose	Nominated	
2022	Hollywood Critics Association TV Awards	Best Writing in a Streaming Series, Comedy	Cinco Paul and Ken Daurio (for "Schmigadoon")	Nominated	
2022	Primetime Emmy Awards	Outstanding Choreography for Scripted Programming	Christopher Gattelli (for “Corn Puddin'" / "Tribulation" / "With All of Your Heart”)	Nominated	
2022	Primetime Emmy Awards	Outstanding Music Composition for a Series (Original Dramatic Score)	Christopher Willis (for "Schmigadoon!'")	Nominated	
2022	Primetime Emmy Awards	Outstanding Original Music and Lyrics	Cinco Paul (for "Corn Puddin'")	Won	
2022	Primetime Emmy Awards	Outstanding Production Design for a Narrative Program (Half-Hour)	Bo Welch, Don Macaulay and Carol Lavallee (for "Schmigadoon!'")	Nominated	
2022	Saturn Awards	Best Streaming Fantasy Television Series	Schmigadoon!	Nominated	
2023
2023	Astra TV Awards	Best Supporting Actress in a Streaming Series, Comedy	Kristin Chenoweth	Nominated	
2023	Astra Creative Arts TV Awards	Best Period Costumes	Schmigadoon!	Nominated	
2023	Astra Creative Arts TV Awards	Best Original Song	"Talk to Daddy"	Nominated	
2023	Primetime Emmy Awards	Outstanding Choreography for Scripted Programming	Christopher Gattelli (for "Bells And Whistles / Good Enough To Eat / Bustin' Out")	Nominated	
2023	Primetime Emmy Awards	Outstanding Cinematography for a Series (Half-Hour)	Jon Joffin (for "Something Real")	Nominated	
2023	Primetime Emmy Awards	Outstanding Production Design for a Narrative Program (Half-Hour)	Jamie Walker McCall, Ryan Garton, Gregory Clarke, Carol Lavallee (for "Famous as Hell")	Nominated	
2023	Saturn Awards	Best Fantasy Television Series	Schmigadoon!	Nominated	

== Stage adaptation ==
A stage adaptation of the first season of the series with book, music, and lyrics by Paul premiered in January 2025 at the Kennedy Center, Washington, D.C., with direction and choreography by Gattelli. The musical debuted on Broadway in April 2026 and won four Tony Awards that year, including best musical, score, book and orchestrations.

Paul has said that he hopes to adapt all three seasons for the stage.

== See also ==
- Schm-reduplication, indicating irony or sarcasm
