= Bo Welch =

American production designer and director

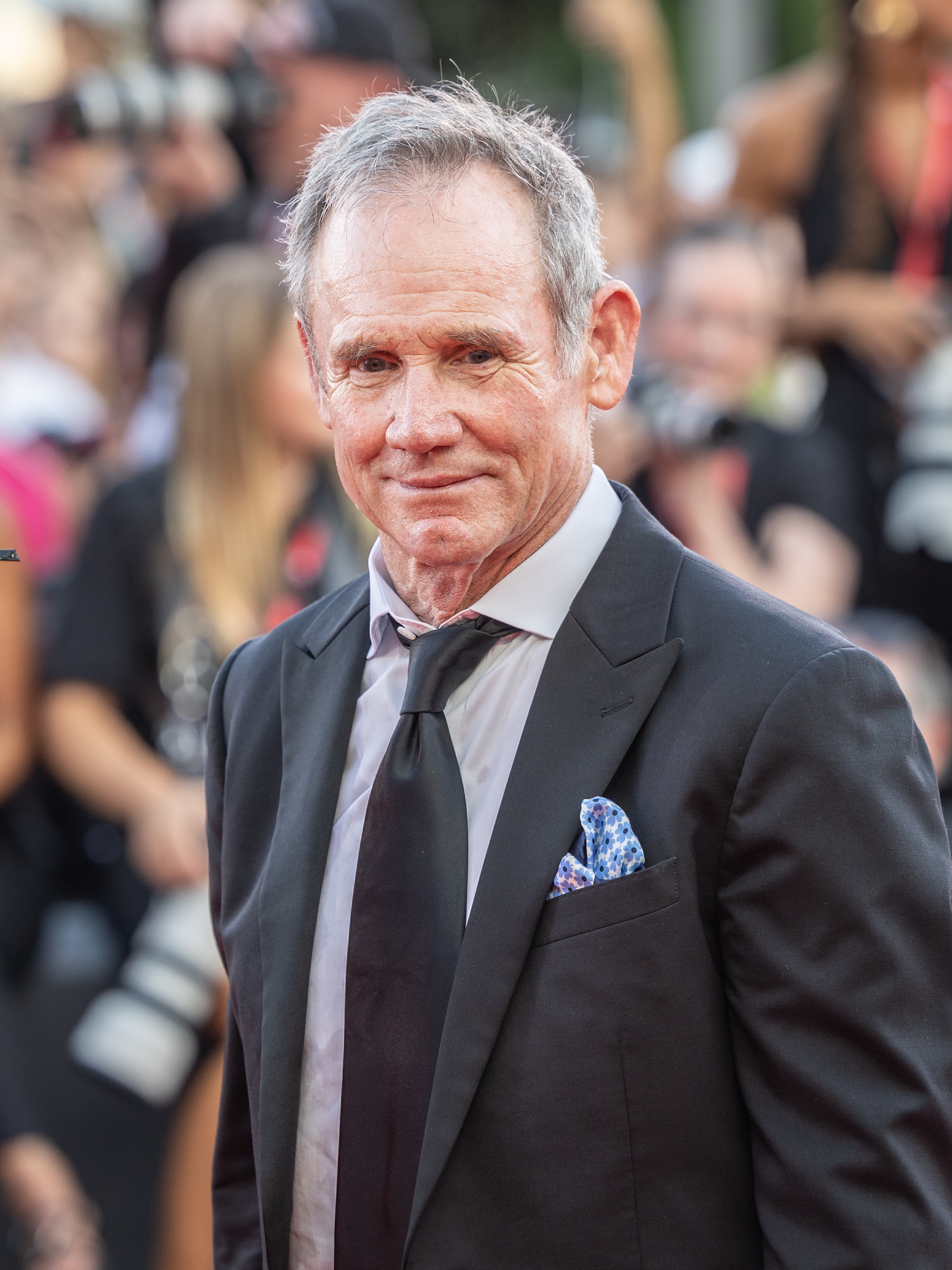
- Welch in 2024
- Born: Robert W. Welch III; 1951 (age 74–75); Pennsylvania, U.S.
- Occupations: Production designer; art director; director; actor
- Years active: 1979–present
- Spouse: Catherine O'Hara (m. 1992; died 2026)
- Children: 2

Robert W. "Bo" Welch III (born 1951) is an American production designer, art director, film and television director, and occasional actor. He is best known for his collaborations with filmmakers such as Tim Burton and Barry Sonnenfeld, and for directing 2003's The Cat in the Hat. During his career, Welch received a BAFTA Award as well as nominations for four Academy Awards and two Primetime Emmy Awards. In 2025, he was honored with Art Directors Guild Lifetime Achievement Award.

== Career ==
Welch worked as a production designer on the Tim Burton films Edward Scissorhands, Beetlejuice, and Batman Returns, as well as the Barry Sonnenfeld films Men in Black and Wild Wild West. He made his directorial debut with The Cat in the Hat, which was poorly received and earned him a nomination for the Golden Raspberry Award for Worst Director.

Welch has been nominated for four Academy Awards for Best Production Design, three shared with set decorator Cheryl Carasik and one shared with J. Michael Riva and Linda DeScenna; the four films are Men in Black, The Birdcage, and A Little Princess with Carasik, and The Color Purple with Riva and DeScenna.

== Personal life ==
Welch met Canadian actress Catherine O'Hara on the set of Beetlejuice in 1987, and they were married from 1992 until her death in 2026. They lived in the Brentwood neighborhood of Los Angeles with their two sons.

== Filmography ==
=== As production designer ===
Year	Film	Other notes
1985	The Color Purple	Nominated — Academy Award for Best Production Design
1986	Violets Are Blue	
1987	The Lost Boys	
1988	The Accidental Tourist	
1988	Beetlejuice	
1989	Ghostbusters II	
1990	Edward Scissorhands	BAFTA Award for Best Production Design
1990	Joe Versus the Volcano	
1991	Grand Canyon	
1992	Batman Returns	Nominated — Awards Circuit Community Awards for Best Production Design
1994	Wolf	
1995	A Little Princess	Nominated — Academy Award for Best Production Design; Nominated — Awards Circuit Community Award for Best Art Direction
1996	The Birdcage	LAFCA Award for Best Production Design; Nominated — Academy Award for Best Production Design; Nominated — ADG Award for Excellence in Production Design; Nominated — Awards Circuit Community Award for Best Art Direction
1997	Men in Black	Nominated — Academy Award for Best Production Design; Nominated — ADG Award for Excellence in Production Design
1998	Primary Colors	
1999	Wild Wild West	
2000	What Planet Are You From?	
2002	Men in Black II	
2008	Space Chimps	
2009	Land of the Lost	
2011	Thor	Nominated — Saturn Award for Best Production Design
2012	Men in Black 3	
2017–2019	A Series of Unfortunate Events	Nominated — Emmy Award for Outstanding Production Design; Nominated — ADG Award for Excellence in Production Design
2021–2022	Schmigadoon!	Nominated — ADG Award for Excellence in Production Design; Nominated — Emmy Award for Outstanding Production Design
2024	Beetlejuice Beetlejuice	Visual consultant

=== As art director ===
Year	Film	Other notes
1983	The Star Chamber	
1983	Heart of Steel	
1984	Swing Shift	
1984	Best Defense	
1984	The Hoboken Chicken Emergency	
1985	The Color Purple	
1986	Violets Are Blue	

=== As director ===
Year	Film	Other notes
1999–2000	Secret Agent Man	Series director: 5 pilot episodes and 1 episode
2001	The Tick	2 episodes
2003	The Cat in the Hat	Nominated — Golden Raspberry Award for Worst Director
2017–2019	A Series of Unfortunate Events	5 episodes

=== As actor ===
Year	Film	Role	Notes
2002	Men in Black II	Astronaut	Uncredited
2012	Men in Black 3	Pedestrian	Uncredited
2014	Tiebraker	Father	
