= Curt Beech =

American art director and production designer

- Occupations: Art director, production designer

Curt Beech is an American art director and production designer. He won a Primetime Emmy Award in the category Outstanding Production Design for his work on the television program Only Murders in the Building. His win was shared with Jordan Jacobs and Rich Murray.
