= Rich Murray (set decorator) =

American set decorator

- Education: University of Chicago
- Occupations: Production designer, set decorator
- Years active: 2005–present

Rich Murray is an American set decorator. He won three Primetime Emmy Awards and was nominated for another one in the category Outstanding Production Design for his work on the television programs Only Murders in the Building and The Penguin.
