= John Shaffner =

American production designer and art director

John Shaffner (born 1952) is an American production designer and art director. He has worked on 44 different television series as well as 68 pilots.

== Early life ==
Shaffner was born in Missoula, Montana. His mother worked for a television station in Cleveland, Ohio in the 1940s. Shaffner attended Sentinel High School and has an undergraduate degree in fine arts from University of Montana and a MFA from Carnegie Mellon University.

== Career ==
Shaffner and his life partner Joe Stewart also work together, including at the outset of their television careers when they designed the set for Star Search. He designed the talk show stages for Ellen DeGeneres, Conan O’Brien, Rachel Ray, and Dr. Phil. He has also built the backdrops for the last three Republican National Conventions.

He designed the set of Friends, Golden Girls, Two and a Half Men, The Big Bang Theory, Roseanne, and Dharma and Greg.

Shaffner served as chairman of the Television Academy and of the Art Directors Council at the Art Directors Guild.

== Awards ==
Shaffner has been nominated for 31 Emmy awards and won four, including three for his work on the CBS series The Magic of David Copperfield.

Shaffner was nominated 33 times by the Art Directors Guild, and won Art Directors Guild Awards for the designs of the 2006 Emmy Awards and The Big Bang Theory.

In 2019, Shaffner and Stewart were awarded Honorary Doctor of Fine Art Degrees from Carnegie Mellon University.

In 2002, Shaffner won the award he sponsors from the University of Montana and now and serves on the college's advisory council.

== Personal ==
Shaffner lives with Joe Stewart in Los Angeles, California. They sponsor the annual gala University of Montana "Odyssey of the Stars" celebrating College of Visual and Performing Arts alumni, and fundraises for scholarships.
