= Art Directors Guild Award for Excellence in Production Design for a Half Hour Single-Camera Television Series =

Television award

The Art Directors Guild Award for Outstanding Production Design for a Half Hour Single-Camera Television Series is an award handed out annually by the Art Directors Guild. It was introduced at the Art Directors Guilds' 13th annual honors, in 2009, after being combined with regular, one-hour series for the first four ceremonies (including with miniseries and television films for the first), and multi-camera series after that.

== Winners and nominations ==
Excellence in Production Design Award - Half Hour Single-Camera Series

Year	Program	Episode(s)	Nominees	Network
2008 (13th)
2008 (13th)	Weeds	"Excellent Treasures"	Joseph P. Lucky (production designer), Julie Bolder (set decorator), William J. Durrell Jr. (art director)	Showtime
2008 (13th)	30 Rock	"Do-Over"	Teresa Mastropierro, Keith Raywood (production designers); Jennifer Greenberg (set decorator); Peter Baran, Fred Kolo (art directors); Elina Kother (scenic artist)	NBC
2008 (13th)	In Treatment	"Week 1: Sophie"	Suzuki Ingerslev (production designer), Lynn Christopher (set designer), Carol Bayne Kelley (set decorator), Michael L. Mayer (art director)	HBO
2008 (13th)	My Name Is Earl	"Bad Earl"	Randy Ser (production designer), Douglas Berkeley (set designer), Julie Kaye Fanton (set decorator), John Zachary (art director), Monica Fedrick (graphic designer)	NBC
2008 (13th)	The Office	"Weight Loss: Parts 1 & 2"	Michael G. Gallenberg (production designer), W. Rick Nichol (set designer), Steve Rostine (set decorator), Matt Flynn (art director)	NBC
2009 (14th)
2009 (14th)	Weeds	"Ducks and Tigers"	Joseph P. Lucky (production designer), Viva Wang (set designer), Julie Bolder (set decorator), William J. Durrell Jr. (art director)	Showtime
2009 (14th)	30 Rock	"Apollo, Apollo"	Teresa Mastropierro, Keith Raywood (production designers); Jennifer Greenberg (set decorator); Peter Baran (art director); Elina Kother (lead scenic artist)	NBC
2009 (14th)	Flight of the Conchords	"Evicted"	Dan Butts (production designer), Cherish M. Hale (set decorator), Kate Bunch (art director), Travis Child (scenic artist)	HBO
2009 (14th)	Modern Family	"Coal Digger"	Richard Berg (production designer), Mick Cukurs (set designer), Christopher Carlson (set decorator), Robert Vukasovich (art director)	ABC
2009 (14th)	The Office	"Niagara"	Michael G. Gallenberg (production designer), W. Rick Nichol (set designer), Steve Rostine (set decorator), Matt Flynn (art director), Henry Saine (graphic designer)	NBC

=== 2010s ===
Year	Program	Episode(s)	Nominees	Network
2010 (15th)
2010 (15th)	Modern Family	"Halloween"	Richard Berg (production designer), Amber Haley (set decorator), Claire Bennett (assistant art director)	ABC
2010 (15th)	30 Rock	"Live Show"	Peter Baran, Teresa Mastropierro, Keith Raywood (production designers); Jennifer Greenberg (set decorator); Elina Kother (scenic artist)	NBC
2010 (15th)	Community	"Basic Rocket Science"	Derek R. Hill (production designer), Denise Pizzini (set decorator), Robert W. Joseph (assistant art director)	NBC
2010 (15th)	Outsourced	"Home for the Diwalidays"	Joseph P. Lucky (production designer), Viva Wang (set designer), Cherie Day Ledwith (set decorator), William J. Durrell Jr. (art director), Meagen Brooks (graphic designer)	NBC
2010 (15th)	United States of Tara	"Trouble Junction"	Cabot McMullen (production designer), Beth Wooke (set decorator), Colin De Rouin (art director)	Showtime
2011 (16th)
2011 (16th)	Modern Family	"Express Christmas"	Richard Berg (production designer), Tara Stephenson (set decorator), Claire Bennett (assistant art director)	ABC
2011 (16th)	30 Rock	"Double-Edged Sword"	Teresa Mastropierro, Keith Raywood (production designers); Jennifer Greenberg (set decorator); Peter Baran (art director/graphic designer); Elina Kother (scenic artist)	NBC
2011 (16th)	Californication	"Monkey Business"	Michael Wylie (production designer), Timothy Stepeck (set decorator), Caroline Quinn (art director)	Showtime
2011 (16th)	New Girl	"Pilot"	Jefferson Sage (production designer), Kenneth A. Larson (set designer), Ronald R. Reiss (set decorator), Michael Budge (art director)	Fox
2011 (16th)	Weeds	"Game-Played"	Joseph P. Lucky (production designer), Sharon Busse (set designer), Julie Bolder (set decorator), William J. Durrell Jr. (art director), Meagen Brooks (graphic designer)	Showtime
2012 (17th)
2012 (17th)	Girls	"Pilot"	Judy Becker (production designer), Heather Loeffler (set decorator), Laura Ballinger (art director), Patricia Sprott (scenic artist)	HBO
2012 (17th)	Community	"Pillows and Blankets"	Denise Pizzini (production designer), Don Diers (set decorator), John B. Vertrees (art director), Ellen King (graphic designer)	NBC
2012 (17th)	Modern Family	"Mistery Date"	Richard Berg (production designer), Brian Kasch (set decorator), Claire Bennett (art director)	ABC
2012 (17th)	The New Normal	"Sofa's Choice"	Tony Fanning (production designer), Martha Johnston (set designer), Bryan Venegas (set decorator), Jonathan Carlos (assistant art director), Eric Rosenberg (graphic designer), Jason Mahakian (model maker)	NBC
2012 (17th)	Parks and Recreation	"Soda Tax"	Ian Phillips (production designer), Robert Sissman (set designer), Kimberly Wannop (set decorator), Jeffrey Mossa (art director), William Eliscu (graphic designer)	NBC
2013 (18th)
2013 (18th)	Veep	"Helsinki"	Jim Gloster (production designer), Beth Kuhn (set designer), Tiffany Zappulla (set decorator), E. David Cosier (art director), Kenneth Roman (graphic designer)	HBO
2013 (18th)	Arrested Development	"The B. Team"	Dan Butts (production designer), Oana Bogdan Miller (set designer), Jennifer Lukehart (set decorator), Kate Bunch (art director)	Netflix
2013 (18th)	Californication	"The Unforgiven"	Ray Yamagata (production designer), George Maya (set designer), Timothy Stepeck (set decorator), Chikako Suzuki (art director)	Showtime
2013 (18th)	Modern Family	"The Wow Factor"	Richard Berg (production designer), Brian Kasch (set decorator), Claire Bennett (art director)	ABC
2013 (18th)	Parks and Recreation	"London"	Ian Phillips (production designer), Robert Sissman (set designer), Kimberly Wannop (set decorator), Adam Rowe (art director), Stella Starlight (graphic designer)	NBC
2014 (19th)
2014 (19th)	Silicon Valley	"Articles of Incorporation", "Signaling Risk", "Optimal Tip-To-Tip Efficiency"	Richard Toyon (production designer), Jim Yarmer (set designer), Cynthia Anne Slagter (set decorator), L.J. Houdyshell (art director), Dorothy Street (graphic designer)	HBO
2014 (19th)	Californication	"Faith, Hope, Love", "Like Father Like Son" & "Kickoff"	Ray Yamagata (production designer), George Maya (set designer), Timothy Stepeck (set decorator), Chikako Suzuki (art director), Dorothy Street (graphic designer)	Showtime
2014 (19th)	House of Lies	"Wreckage", "Middlegame" & "Zhang"	Ray Yamagata (production designer), George Maya (set designer), Timothy Stepeck (set decorator), Chikako Suzuki (art director), Samantha Englender (assistant art director), Dorothy Street (graphic designer)	Showtime
2014 (19th)	Modern Family	"Marco Polo", "Won't You Be Our Neighbor" & Halloween 3: AwesomeLand"	Claire Bennett (production designer), Michael Voelker (set decorator), Sam Kramer (art director)	ABC
2014 (19th)	Veep	"Clovis", "Special Relationship", and "Debate"	Jim Gloster (production designer); Jennifer Engel (set decorator); E. David Cosier, Sharon Davis, Rosy Thomas (art directors); Kenneth Roman (graphic designer); April Freeman (scenic artist)	HBO
2015 (20th)
2015 (20th)	The Muppets.	"The Ex-Factor" & "Pigs in a Blanket"	Denise Pizzini (production designer), Kenneth Larson (set designer), Don Diers (set decorator), Claudia Roque (assistant art director), Geoffrey Mandel (graphic designer)	ABC
2015 (20th)	The Last Man on Earth	"Alive in Tucson", "Is There Anybody Out There?" & "Silent Night"	Bruce Robert Hill (production designer); Everett Chase, Steve Christensen, Jeff Ozimek (set designers); Erin Boyd, Robert Gould (set decorators); Bryan Langer, Daniel Turk, C.L. Ward (assistant art directors); Martin Charles, Adam Tankell (graphic designers)	Fox
2015 (20th)	Silicon Valley	"Sand Hill Shuffle", "Homicide" & "Adult Content"	Richard Toyon (production designer), Jim Yarmer (set designer), Jennifer Mueller (set decorator), L.J. Houdyshell (art director), Jaclyn Hauser (assistant art director), Lori West (graphic designer)	HBO
2015 (20th)	Transparent	"Kina Hora", "The Book of Life" & "Oscillate"	Catherine Smith (production designer); Daniel Bradford, Jean-Paul Leonard, Julia K. Levine (set designers); Susan Mina Eschelbach (set decorator); Maria L. Baker, Macie Vener (art directors)	Amazon Prime Video
2015 (20th)	Veep	"Joint Session" & "Election Night"	Jim Gloster (production designer), Kuo Pao Lian (set designer), Jennifer Engel (set decorator), E. David Cosier (art director), Kenneth Roman (graphic designer)	HBO
2016 (21st)
2016 (21st)	Mozart in the Jungle	"Now I Will Sing"	Tommaso Ortino (production designer), Letizia Santucci (set decorator), Susanna Codognato (art director), Massimo Pauletto (assistant art director), Alfredo Lazaro (graphic designer), Stefano Bernabei (scenic artist), Patricia Espinosa (illustrator), Simone Begani (model maker), Irene Caselli (matte artist)	Amazon Prime Video
2016 (21st)	The Last Man on Earth	"Pitch Black", "The Power of Power", & "Mama's Hideaway"	Bruce Robert Hill (production designer); Thomas Machan (set designer); Erin Boyd (set decorator); Bryan Langer (assistant art director); Jason Zev Cohen, Dorothy Street (graphic designers)	Fox
2016 (21st)	Silicon Valley	"Two in the Box", "Bachmanity Insanity", and "Daily Active Users"	Richard Toyon (production designer), Jim Yarmer (set designer), Jennifer Mueller (set decorator), Oana Bogdan Miller (art director), Jaclyn Hauser (assistant art director), Lori West (graphic designer)	HBO
2016 (21st)	Transparent	"If I Were a Bell"	Catherine Smith (production designer); Daniel Bradford, Jean-Paul Leonard (set designers); Dea Jensen (set decorator); Maria L. Baker, Macie Vener (art directors)	Amazon Prime Video
2016 (21st)	Veep	"Kissing Your Sister"	Jim Gloster (production designer); Andrew Leitch, Shelley A. Wallace (set designers); Kimberly Wannop (set decorator); Karen Steward (art director); Robert Bernard (graphic designer); Richard Ewan (scenic artist)	HBO
2017 (22nd)
2017 (22nd)	GLOW	"Pilot", "The Wrath of Kuntar" & "The Dusty Spur"	Todd Fjelsted (production designer); Ryan Watson (set decorator); Cate Bangs, Glenn Williams (digital set designers); Harry E. Otto (art director); Vanessa Riegel (graphic designer)	Netflix
2017 (22nd)	Future Man	"Pandora's Mailbox", "Beyond the TruffleDome" & "A Date with Destiny"	Jessica Kender (production designer); Arthur Chadwick, Sam Ogden (set designers); Lisa Clark (set decorator); Brian Grego (art director); Morgan Lindsey Price (assistant art director); Steven Milosavleski (graphic designer)	Hulu
2017 (22nd)	Master of None	"Le Nozze", "Thanksgiving" & "Amarsi Un Pò"	Amy Williams (production designer); Marie Lynn Wagner (set designer); Luisa Iemma, Jasmine Ballou Jones, Graham Wichman (set decorators); Jan Jericho, Tamara Marini (art directors); Mike Chesbro (assistant art director); Eric Bryant (graphic designer); Danh Nguyen (scenic artist)	Netflix
2017 (22nd)	Silicon Valley	"Hooli-Con" & "Server Error"	Richard Toyon (production designer); Adam Mull, Chris Sanford (set designers); David A. Cook, Jennifer Mueller (set decorators); Jaclyn Hauser (art director); Andrew Sloane (assistant art director)	HBO
2017 (22nd)	Veep	"Omaha"	Jim Gloster (production designer); Arthur Chadwick, Alan Farkas (set designers); Kimberly Wannop (set decorator); Andrew Leitch (art director); Graham Ratliff (graphic designer)	HBO
2018 (23rd)
2018 (23rd)	GLOW	"Viking Funeral", "Perverts are People, Too" & "Rosalie"	Todd Fjelsted (production designer); Ryan Watson (set decorator); Jean Harter, Glenn Williams (digital set designers); Harry E. Otto (art director); Vanessa Riegel (graphic designer)	Netflix
2018 (23rd)	Atlanta	"Teddy Perkins"	Timothy David O'Brien (production designer), Aimee Athnos (set decorator), Taylor Mosbey (art director)	FX
2018 (23rd)	The Good Place	"Janet(s)"	Ian Phillips (production designer); Camille M. Bratkowski (set designer); Kimberly Wannop (set decorator); Adam Rowe (art director); Graham Ratliff, Evan Regester (graphic artists)	NBC
2018 (23rd)	Homecoming	"Mandatory"	Anastasia White (production designer); Doug Mowat (set decorator); Richard Bloom (art director); Callie Andreadis (assistant art director); Nancy Deren, Karl J. Martin, David Meyer (set designers); Kacey Koeberer, Geoffrey Mandel (graphic designers); Kasra Farahani, Craig Shoji (illustrators)	Amazon Prime Video
2018 (23rd)	Silicon Valley	"Tech Evangelist" & "Artificial Emotional Intelligence"	Richard Toyon (production designer); Sam Ogden (set designer); Brandi Kalish (set decorator); Jaclyn Hauser (art director); Andrew Sloane (assistant art director); Dylan J. Hay-Chapman, Steven Samanen, Lori West (graphic designers)	HBO
2019 (24th)
2019 (24th)	Russian Doll	"Nothing in This World Is Easy"	Michael Bricker (production designer), Jessica Petruccelli (set decorator), John Cox (art director), Emma Stensaas (graphic designer)	Netflix
2019 (24th)	Barry	"ronny/lily"	Tyler B. Robinson (production designer), Rachael Ferrara (set decorator), Eric Schoonover (art director), Curtis Moore (assistant art director), Kenneth Larson (set designer), Cris Shapan (graphic designer)	HBO
2019 (24th)	Fleabag	"Episode 5"	Johnathan Paul Green (production designer), Lucy Gardetto (set decorator), Joanne King (art director), Rosalind Boulton (standby art director)	Amazon Prime Video
2019 (24th)	GLOW	"Up, Up, Up"	Todd Fjelsted (production designer); Cynthia Slagter (set decorator); Valerie Green (art director); Cate Bangs, Morgan Lindsey Price (set designers); Vanessa Riegel (graphic designer)	Netflix
2019 (24th)	The Good Place	"Employee of the Bearimy", "Help Is Other People"	Ian Phillips (production designer), Kim Wanop (set decorator), Adam Rowe (art director); Camille M. Bratkowski (set designer), Graham Ratliff (graphic designer)	NBC

=== 2020s ===
Year	Program	Episode(s)	Nominees	Network
2020 (25th)
2020 (25th)	What We Do in the Shadows	"Resurrection," "Collaboration," "Witches"	Kate Bunch (production designer), Aleks Cameron (art director), Shayne Fox (set decorator)	FX
2020 (25th)	Dead to Me	"You Don't Have to Go", "It Had to Be You"	L.J. Houdyshell (production designer), Jaclyn Hauser (art director), Suzan Wexler (set designer), Jackie Morrison (graphic designer), Brandi Kalish (set decorator)	Netflix
2020 (25th)	Emily in Paris	"Emily in Paris"	Anne Seibel (production designer); Jean-Yves Rabier (art director); Camille Bodin, Charles Clément (assistant art directors); Lilith Bekmezian (illustrator); Laure Angotti, Léa Blanchard (graphic artists); Christelle Maisonneuve (set decorator)	Netflix
2020 (25th)	Mythic Quest: Raven's Banquet	"Pilot"	Mark Worthington (production designer); David DiGiacomo (art director); Adriana Dardas, Tom Taylor (set designers); Rob Bernard (graphic designer); Kelly Berry (set decorator)	Apple TV+
2020 (25th)	Space Force	"The Launch"	Susie Mancini (production designer); Gary Warshaw (art director); Brett Hatcher (assistant art director); Kyle Courter, Kiel Gookin, Chikako Suzuki, Mindi Toback (set designers); James Oxford (illustrator); Geoffrey Mandel, Adee Serrao (graphic artists); Rachael Ferrara (set decorator)	Netflix
2021 (26th)
2021 (26th)	What We Do in the Shadows	"The Prisoner," "The Cloak of Desperation," "The Siren"	Kate Bunch (production designer), Kim McQuiston (art director), Shayne Fox (set decorator)	FX
2021 (26th)	Hacks	"Primm"	Jon Carlos (production designer); James Bolenbaugh (art director); Rachel Aguirre (assistant art director); Sally Thornton (set designer); Graham Ratliff, Evan Regester (graphic designers); Ellen Reede-Dorros (set decorator)	HBO Max
2021 (26th)	Only Murders in the Building	"True Crime"	Curt Beech (production designer); Jordan Jacobs (art director); Peter Dorsey, Martin Fahrer, Dennis Moyes (assistant art directors); Ali Kashfi (illustrator); Hope Ardizzone (scenic artist); Hunter Popalis, Emma Stensaas (graphic artists); Rich Murray (set decorator)	Hulu
2021 (26th)	Schmigadoon!	"Schmigadoon!"	Bo Welch (production designer); Don MacAulay (supervising art director); Tara Arnett (art director); Mira Caveno (assistant art director); Chris Beach, Bianka Bergeron, Jay Mitchell, Peter Stratford, Joe Wolkosky (set designers); Warren Flanagan, Milena Zdravkovic (concept illustrators); Erin Sinclair, Lisa Leung (graphic designers); Hitoshi (model maker); John Wilcox (scenic artist); Carl Lavallee (set decorator)	Apple TV+
2021 (26th)	Ted Lasso	"Carol of the Bells," "Man City," "Bear After Hours"	Paul Cripps (production designer); Stacey Dickinson (supervising art director); Lydia Moss, Megan Tweed (assistant art directors); Caroline Reilly (standby art director); Bethany Doughty, Beatriz Fernandes (junior draughtsmen); Lizzy Butler, Luiza Pissurno, Maisie Robinson (graphic designers); Kate Goodman (set decorator)	Apple TV+
2022 (27th)	Emily in Paris	"What's It All About..."; "How to Lose a Designer in 10 Days"	Anne Seibel (production designer); Dominique Moisan (supervising art director); Virginie Irdel, Simon Witte (art directors); Camille Bodin (assistant art director); Lilith Bekmezian (illustrator); Robin Chichoux, Luce Jalbert, Alexandra Laval (graphic designers); Isabelle Girard (set decorator)	Netflix
2022 (27th)	Hacks	"Trust the Process"	Alec Contestabile (production designer); (supervising art director); Rob Tokarz (art director); Brontë Campbell, Katelyn Budke, Michael Piccirillo (assistant art directors); Betty Krul, Jiarui Bai (set designers); Evan Regester, Jeff Lee (graphic designers); Jennifer Lukehart (set decorator)	HBO
2022 (27th)	Only Murders in the Building	"Framed"	Patrick Howe (production designer); Jordan Jacobs (art director); Martin Faher, Dan Kuchar (assistant art directors); Hunter Popalis, Ginger Labella (graphic designers); Hope Ardizzone (scenic artist); Rich Murray (set decorator)	Prime Video
2022 (27th)	Our Flag Means Death	"Pilot"	Ra Vincent (production designer); Bradley Rubin (supervising art director); Brittany Bradford, Samantha Avila (art directors); Harshita Reddy, Katia Nájera Viale (assistant art directors); Andrew Reeder, Christopher Sanford, Christopher L. Ward, Trinh Vu, Dean Wolcott, Elsa Mayuri, Randall Wilkins (set designers); Ellen Lampl, Drew Weininger (graphic artists); Christopher Carlson (set decorator)	HBO Max
2022 (27th)	What We Do in the Shadows	"The Grand Opening"; "The Night Market"; "Pine Barrens"	Shayne Fox (production designer); Aaron Noel (art director); Andrea Raymond, Bruce Wrighte, Nick Agustyn (assistant art directors); Aleks Cameron, Diette Macdonald, Rebecca Daly, Jenn Luckas (set designers); Stephen Crowhurst (graphic designer); Po Gour (concept artist); Aaron Smith (scenic artist); Kerri Wylie (set decorator)	FX

== Programs with multiple wins ==
Totals include wins for all previous incarnations of award.

3 wins

- Mad TV

2 wins

- GLOW
- Modern Family
- Weeds
- What We Do in the Shadows
- Will & Grace

== Programs with multiple nominations ==
Totals include wins for all previous incarnations of award.

6 nominations

- Modern Family

5 nominations

- Silicon Valley
- Veep

4 nominations

- 30 Rock
- Will & Grace

3 nominations

- Californication
- GLOW
- How I Met Your Mother
- Star Trek: Voyager
- Two and a Half Men
- Weeds

2 nominations

- Arrested Development
- Community
- Frasier
- The Good Place
- The Last Man on Earth
- Life with Bonnie
- The Office
- Parks and Recreation
- Titus
- Transparent
- What We Do in the Shadows
- The X-Files
