= Art Directors Guild Awards 2014 =

Award ceremony hosted in 2015

19th Art Directors Guild Awards
- Date: January 31, 2015

The 19th Art Directors Guild Awards, which were given on January 31, 2015, honored the best production designers of 2014.

== Winners and nominees ==
=== Film ===
Period Film:

- Adam Stockhausen – The Grand Budapest Hotel
  - Maria Djurkovic – The Imitation Game
  - David Crank – Inherent Vice
  - John-Paul Kelly – The Theory of Everything
  - Jon Hutman – Unbroken

Fantasy Film:

- Charles Wood – Guardians of the Galaxy
  - Peter Wenham – Captain America: The Winter Soldier
  - James Chinlund – Dawn of the Planet of the Apes
  - Nathan Crowley – Interstellar
  - Dennis Gassner – Into the Woods

Contemporary Film:

- Kevin Thompson – Birdman
  - James J. Murakami and Charisse Cardenas – American Sniper
  - Jess Gonchor – Foxcatcher
  - Donald Graham Burt – Gone Girl
  - Kevin Kavanaugh – Nightcrawler

=== Television ===
One-Hour Period or Fantasy Single-Camera Television Series

- Deborah Riley – Game of Thrones (for "The Laws of Gods and Men")
  - Bill Groom – Boardwalk Empire (for "Golden Days for Boys and Girls")
  - Doug Kraner – Gotham (for "Pilot")
  - Howard Cummings – The Knick (for "Method and Madness" and "Working Late a Lot")
  - Dan Bishop – Mad Men (for "Time Zones")

One-Hour Contemporary Single-Camera Television Series

- Alex DiGerlando – True Detective (for "The Locked Room" and "Form and Void")
  - John D. Kretschmer – Homeland (for "The Drone Queen")
  - Steve Arnold – House of Cards (for "Chapter 18")
  - Dave Blass – Justified (for "A Murder of Crowes", "Wrong Roads", and "The Toll")
  - Karen Steward – The Newsroom (for "Boston", "Main Justice", and "Contempt")

Episode of a Half Hour Single-Camera Television Series

- Richard Toyon – Silicon Valley (for "Articles of Incorporation", "Signaling Risk", and "Optimal Tip-To-Tip Efficiency")
  - Ray Yamagata – Californication (for "Faith, Hope, Love", "Like Father Like Son", and "Kickoff")
  - Ray Yamagata – House of Lies (for "Wreckage", "Middlegame", and "Zha- Moreng")
  - Claire Bennett – Modern Family (for "Marco Polo", "Won't You Be Our Neighbor", and "Halloween 3: AwesomeLand")
  - James Gloster – Veep (for "Clovis", "Special Relationship", and "Debate")

Multi-Camera Series

- John Shaffner – The Big Bang Theory (for "The Convention Conundrum", "The Locomotive Manipulation", and "The Status Quo Combustion")
  - Stephan Olson – How I Met Your Mother (for "How Your Mother Met Me")
  - John Shaffner – Mike & Molly (for "Mike & Molly's Excellent Adventure" and "The Dice Lady Cometh")
  - Glenda Rovello – The Millers (for "You Are the Wind Beneath My Wings, Man", "Con-Troversy", and "Papa Was a Rolling Bone")
  - Cabot McMullen – Undateable (for "Pilot")

Miniseries or Television Movie:

- Mark Worthington – American Horror Story: Freak Show (for "Massacres and Matinees")
  - Seth Reed – Cosmos: A Spacetime Odyssey (for "Unafraid of the Dark")
  - John Blackie and Warren Alan Young – Fargo
  - Patrizia Von Brandenstein – Houdini
  - Arwel W. Jones – Sherlock: His Last Vow
