= Ben Lawson =

Australian actor

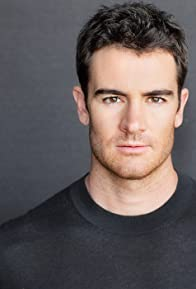
- Born: 6 February 1980 (age 46); Brisbane, Queensland, Australia
- Occupation: Actor
- Years active: 1993–present
- Family: Josh Lawson (brother)

Ben Lawson (born 6 February 1980) is an Australian actor. From 2006 until 2008, he played Frazer Yeats in the Australian soap opera Neighbours. The role earned him a Logie Award nomination. Lawson has since appeared in several American television series, including The Deep End, Covert Affairs, and Don't Trust the B— in Apartment 23. In 2011, he starred opposite Natalie Portman and Ashton Kutcher in the film No Strings Attached. From 2017 to 2018, he starred as Damien Rennett on the ABC political drama Designated Survivor. He also played baseball coach Rick Wlodimierzin in the second season of 13 Reasons Why, and Larry Hemsworth on The Good Place. Lawson portrays Lachlan Murdoch in the 2019 film Bombshell, alongside his brother Josh Lawson who played James Murdoch. He also starred in the Netflix series Firefly Lane (2021-2023).

== Early life and education ==
Ben Lawson was born on 6 February 1980 in Brisbane, Queensland. He was raised there, and attended St. Joseph's College, Gregory Terrace. His father Peter is a GP and his mother Dianne was a flight attendant and then a secretary. He is the third of five boys, including Josh Lawson, an actor who is known for his appearances on Thank God You're Here. Their parents divorced when Lawson was seven.

At the age of 11-12 he set out to secure an acting agent. A number of screen appearances followed, in Time Trax (1993), The Adventures of Skippy (1993), The Wayne Manifesto (1997), Sabrina Down Under (1999), Chameleon II: Death Match (1999) and TwentyfourSeven (2022). He has said he was "kicked out" of drama school at the University of Southern Queensland, going on to graduate from the National Institute of Dramatic Art (NIDA) in Sydney.

== Career ==
=== Acting ===
Lawson joined the main cast of the Australian soap opera Neighbours as Frazer Yeats in 2006. His role earned him a nomination for Most Popular New Male Talent at the 2007 Logie Awards. Lawson departed Neighbours in April 2008. He then moved to Los Angeles in 2008.

Lawson had a small role in the film No Strings Attached, which starred Natalie Portman and Ashton Kutcher. He also appeared in the television action drama Covert Affairs. In August 2012, he landed a recurring role in the ABC sitcom Don't Trust the B— in Apartment 23 as Benjamin, a love interest for main character Chloe (Krysten Ritter). In 2017, Lawson starred in the short lived CBS drama Doubt opposite Laverne Cox. On The Talk, Cox said that Lawson was "an amazing actor".

Lawson played Larry Hemsworth, the fictional "hideous shame" of the Hemsworth family on The Good Place, and he and his brother Josh played Lachlan and James Murdoch respectively in the 2019 film Bombshell.

In July 2017, Lawson was cast as MI6 agent Damien Rennett on the second season of the ABC political drama, Designated Survivor. In 2018, Lawson played high school coach Rick on the second season of the Netflix original series, 13 Reasons Why. In 2019, Lawson starred as Thomas 'Clay' Fox Jr. in Dolly Parton's Heartstrings, Netflix's anthology series about Dolly Parton. In 2021, Lawson starred in the Netflix series Firefly Lane opposite Katherine Heigl and Sarah Chalke.

In May 2024, Lawson was named for the Australian-Irish co-commission series Mix Tape. for Binge He also filmed the first series of Victoria drama series, Love Divided By Eleven for Stan.

=== Poetry ===
During the 2020 Australian bushfires, Lawson wrote a poem titled To My Country, and a video of him reading it went viral on social media. In January 2021, the poem was turned into a book of the same name with illustrations by Bruce Whatley and proceeds from sales going to the Port Macquarie Koala Hospital.

In January 2021, he wrote a poem entitled The 26th of January about the history of Australia Day, using sarcasm to support the movement to change the date.

== Personal life ==
In March 2023, he became an American citizen.

== Filmography ==
=== Film ===
Year	Title	Role	Notes
1995	Silent Hunter	Bud	
2011	No Strings Attached	Sam	
2011	In Loco Parentis	Richard	Short film
2014	The Little Death	Glenn	
2015	Now Add Honey	Joshua Redlich	
2016	Keep the Chocolates	Man	Short film
2019	The Way We Weren't	Brandon	
2019	Bombshell	Lachlan Murdoch	
2021	Everything I Ever Wanted to Tell My Daughter About Men	Longfellow	
2025	Anaconda	TV MD - Brant Markham	

=== Television ===
Year	Title	Role	Notes
1993	Time Trax	12-year-old Darien	Episode: "A Stranger in Time"
1993	The Adventures of Skippy	Christopher	Episode: "Skippy and the Tiger"
1997	The Wayne Manifesto	Mervyn	Episode: "Wheels Within Wheels"
1999	Sabrina Down Under	Waiter	Television film
1999	Chameleon II: Death Match	Tyler Kubica	Television film
2001	TwentyfourSeven	Scott	Episode: "It's My Life"
2006	Perfect Disaster	Ken	Episode: "Fire Storm"
2006–2008	Neighbours	Frazer Yeats	188 episodes Role held: 12 October 2006 – 25 April 2008; Nominated—Logie for Most Popular New Male Talent
2009	Ghostly Encounters	Theatre Ghost	Episode: "Buildings with History"
2010	The Deep End	Liam Priory	Main role; 6 episodes
2011	Covert Affairs	Dr. Scott Weiss	3 episodes
2012	The League	Dr. Levenson	Episode: "The Hoodie"
2012–2013	Don't Trust the B— in Apartment 23	Benjamin Lovett	3 episodes
2013	Bones	Martin Zand	Episode: "The Fury in the Jury"
2013	The Exes	Derek	Episode: "How the Grinch Spent Xmas"
2014	Rake	Craig	3 episodes
2014	Secrets & Lies	Paul Murnane	3 episodes
2014	Love Child	Colin Ryan	3 episodes
2014	2 Broke Girls	Tim	Episode: "And the Wedding Cake Cake Cake"
2014	Jennifer Falls	David	Episode: "Triangle"
2014	Friends with Better Lives	Doug	Episode: "No More Mr. Nice Guy"
2014	Modern Family	George	Episode: "Won't You Be Our Neighbor"
2014	Mulaney	Greg	Episode: "In the Name of the Mother, and the Son, and the Holy Andre"
2016	iZombie	Andy LeGare	Episode: "Fifty Shades of Grey Matter"
2016	Angel from Hell	Darren Jensen	Episode: "Soulmates"
2016	Billions	Mikey	Episode: "Where the F*ck Is Donnie?"
2017	Grimm	William Stillman	Episode: "The Seven Year Itch"
2017	Doubt	DA Peter Garrett	9 episodes
2017–2018	Designated Survivor	Damian Rennett	Main role (season 2); 17 episodes
2018	13 Reasons Why	Coach Rick Wlodimierz	Recurring role (season 2); 7 episodes
2018	The Good Place	Larry Hemsworth	3 episodes
2019	Dollface	Oliver	Episode: "F*** Buddy"
2019	Heartstrings	Clay Fox	Episode: "If I Had Wings"
2021	The Waltons' Homecoming	John Walton Sr.	TV movie
2021	The Moth Effect	Host	TV miniseries
2021–2023	Firefly Lane	Johnny Ryan	Main role; 26 episodes
2025	Mix Tape	Michael	TV series: 4 episodes
2026	Dear Life	Andrew Schneider	TV series: 6 episodes
