= Foreshadow (disambiguation) =

Foreshadow is a security vulnerability that affects modern microprocessors.

Foreshadow may also refer to:

- Foreshadow (film), a 2013 Australian film
- Foreshadow (LEXX), a fictional starship in the TV show LEXX

== See also ==
- Foreshadowing (disambiguation)
