= Charles de Lauzirika =

American film director

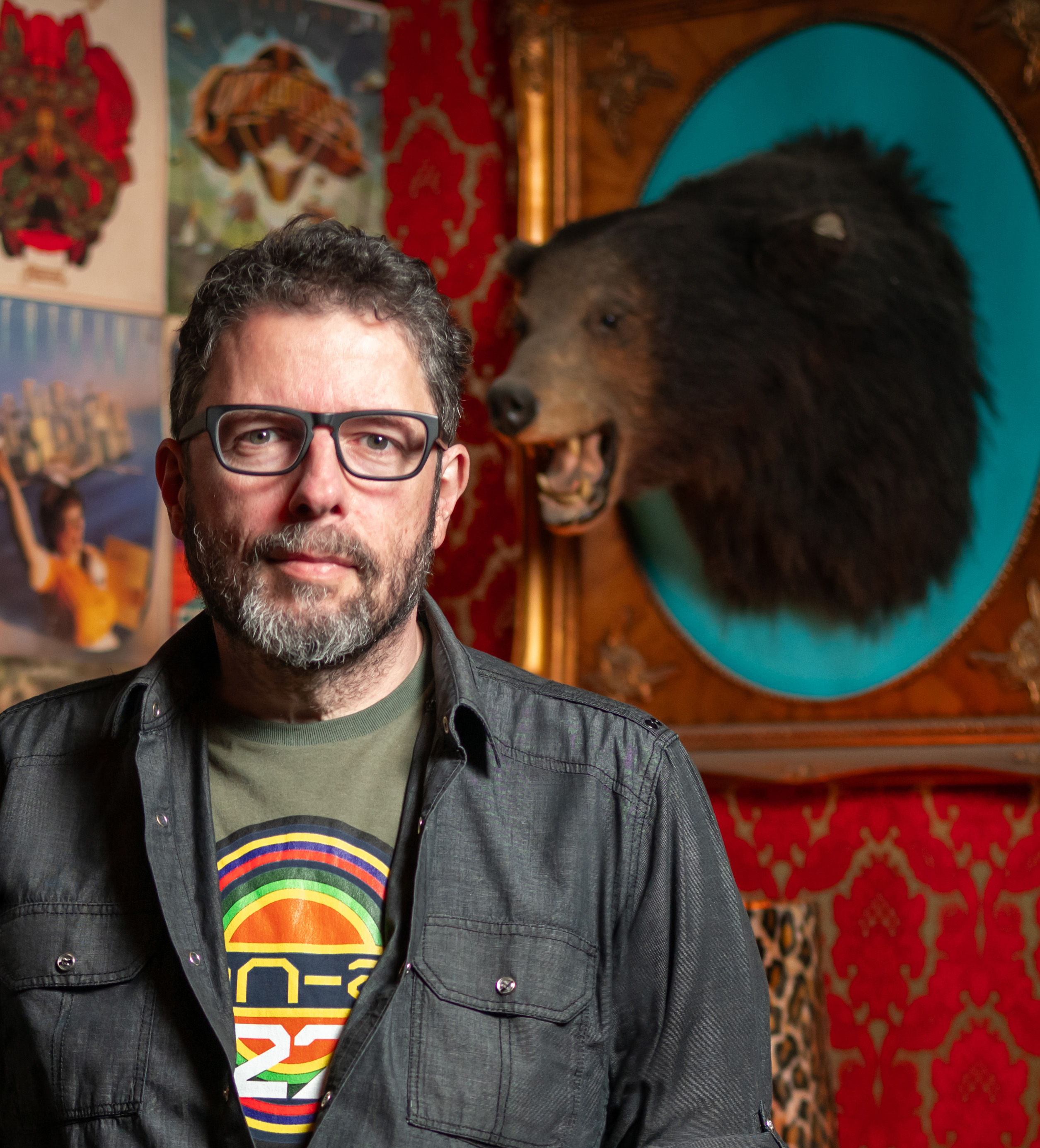
- Charles de Lauzirika at FilmQuest 2023.
- Born: August 17, 1967 (age 59); Los Angeles, California, U.S.
- Occupations: Filmmaker; DVD/Blu-ray Producer
- Spouse(s): Carlee Baker (married, 2018–present)
- Children: 1

Charles de Lauzirika (born August 17, 1967 in Los Angeles, California) is an American DVD and Blu-ray producer and filmmaker.

== Early years ==
Lauzirika, of Basque ancestry, spent his early years in La Crescenta, California and attended Glendale College where he served as entertainment editor of In Focus, the college's weekly Public-access television show. He also contributed to the school's weekly, El Vaquero, receiving several JACC student journalism awards for his work as editorial cartoonist, entertainment editor and editor-in-chief. Lauzirika later attended the University of Southern California School of Cinematic Arts, where he wrote and directed a fully funded 16mm sync sound film in the program's CNTV 480 Advanced Production Workshop; Lauzirika graduated in 1994.

== Film and DVD career ==
While attending USC film school, Lauzirika concurrently worked for numerous film companies, including Lucasfilm Ltd., Lightstorm Entertainment, Warner Bros., Silver Pictures and Scott Free Productions. While working as a story analyst for directors Ridley Scott and Tony Scott, Lauzirika was chosen by Ridley Scott to supervise and produce elaborate DVD special editions of Scott's classic films. Lauzirika's works have been nominated for Video and DVD Premiere Awards, and in 2003 his comprehensive nine-disc Alien Quadrilogy garnered the DVDX Award for Best Overall DVD, Classic Movie. In 2008, Lauzirika won two Saturn Awards for his work on Blade Runner (Best DVD Special Edition) and Twin Peaks (Best Retro Television Release). In 2011, he won his third Saturn Award for the Alien Anthology (Best DVD Movie Collection.) And in 2015, Lauzirika won his fourth Saturn Award for producing Twin Peaks The Entire Mystery (Best Blu-ray Television Release.)

Lauzirika has been in charge of the restorations and new cuts of such as films as Alien³, Legend and Blade Runner: The Final Cut, each project requiring new visual effects and additional scenes which had to seamlessly blend in with existing footage. He has also directed several commercials and short films, as well as the music video for Montell Jordan's When You Get Home (1998) which featured Billy Dee Williams. Lauzirika himself occasionally serves as camera operator in his documentary interviews, thereby fostering a more intimate environment, allowing the interviewee to be more sharing on camera. Although his work has long been associated with the films of Ridley Scott, Lauzirika has also produced DVD content for the works of numerous other directors, including David Lynch, Sam Raimi, James Cameron, the Coen brothers, Michael Bay, David Fincher, Robert Rodriguez, Marc Webb, John Badham, Neil Marshall, Jean-Pierre Jeunet, Mark Romanek and Tony Scott.

In 2010, Empire reported that Lauzirika was working on a comprehensive Blu-ray release of the four Alien films, now known as the Alien Anthology. In addition to creating new content, he also oversaw a new sound mix of the Alien³ Special Edition which necessitated the return of actors Sigourney Weaver, Charles Dance and Lance Henriksen to re-record their dialogue due to the poor production sound heard in the film's original rough assembly. In 2011 it was reported that Lauzirika was working on DVD/Blu-ray special editions for such films as Transformers: Dark of the Moon, The Amazing Spider-Man and Prometheus.

Lauzirika made his feature directorial debut with the psychological thriller Crave which began shooting on October 23, 2009, in Detroit, Michigan, and stars Josh Lawson, Emma Lung, Edward Furlong and Ron Perlman. Lauzirika is also one of the film's producers and co-wrote the screenplay with Robert A. Lawton. Crave had its sold out world premiere at the Fantasia International Film Festival on July 24, 2012 and went on to win the New Flesh Award for Best First Feature Film. The film then had its sold out United States premiere at Fantastic Fest in Austin, Texas on September 22, 2012, with Lauzirika going on to win Best Director in the festival's Next Wave competition. He was also attached to direct and co-write a feature adaptation of the Philip K. Dick science fiction short story, "I Hope I Shall Arrive Soon". In 2013, Lauzirika was named Jury President in the First Feature category at the Fantasia International Film Festival, the same category that Crave won the previous year.

In 2019, Lauzirika produced a 71 minute documentary on the making of the Hellboy reboot directed by Neil Marshall. He also directed a short horror satire titled Love Bite, starring Carlee Baker and Cuyle Carvin, and written by Baker and Lauzirika. The film had its world premiere at the Sitges Film Festival on October 6, 2019.

In 2023, Lauzirika wrote and directed the short horror film Honk starring Zach Galligan and Tyler Mane. The film began its festival run with its world premiere in competition at the Sitges Film Festival on October 12, 2023. It later had its U.S. Premiere at FilmQuest in Provo, Utah on November 2, 2023, where it won the award for Best Sound (Short.) Shortly thereafter, the film won the prestigious Little Golden Skull (Global) award for Best Short Film at Mórbido Fest, based in Mexico City, Mexico, marking its Latin American Premiere.

It was also announced in 2023 that Lauzirika is attached to direct a documentary about David Lean's troubled production of Ryan's Daughter entitled Reap the Whirlwind: David Lean and the Madness of Ryan's Daughter.

In May 2024, Lauzirika confirmed that he had produced the six-part documentary Torn Asunder: Waging Alex Garland's Civil War for the home entertainment release of Alex Garland's Civil War (film).

== Selected Films and Documentaries ==
Year	Title	Original Source	Credit(s)
2024	Torn Asunder: Waging Alex Garland's Civil War	Civil War (2024, Garland)	producer
2023	Honk	Short Film (Narrative)	director, writer, producer, editor
2019	Love Bite	Short Film (Narrative)	director, co-writer, producer
2019	Tales of the Wild Hunt: Hellboy Reborn	Hellboy (2019 film) (2017, Marshall)	producer
2017	A Very Lovely Dream: One Week in Twin Peaks	Twin Peaks (2017 TV series) (2017, Lynch)	director, producer, camera operator
2016	The Long Way Home: Making The Martian	The Martian (2015, R. Scott)	director, producer, camera operator
2015	Star Wars Launch Bay - Meet the Makers	Star Wars (1977, Lucas)	director, producer
2015	Keepers of the Covenant: Making Exodus: Gods and Kings	Exodus: Gods and Kings (2014, R. Scott)	director, producer, camera operator
2015	The Lawgiver's Legacy	Exodus: Gods and Kings (2014, R. Scott)	director, producer, camera operator
2014	Between Two Worlds	Twin Peaks: Fire Walk With Me (1992, Lynch)	director, producer
2014	The Wages of Heroism: Making The Amazing Spider-Man 2	The Amazing Spider-Man 2 (2014, Webb)	director, producer, camera operator
2014	The A Game: Michael Bay's Pain & Gain	Pain & Gain (2013, Bay)	producer
2013	Lensing One Hour Photo	One Hour Photo (2002, Romanek)	producer
2013	Crave	Feature Film (Narrative)	director, co-writer, producer
2012	The Furious Gods: Making Prometheus	Prometheus (2012, R. Scott)	director, producer, camera operator
2012	Rite of Passage: The Amazing Spider-Man Reborn	The Amazing Spider-Man (2012, Webb)	director, producer, camera operator
2012	Above and Beyond: Exploring Dark of the Moon	Transformers: Dark of the Moon (2011, Bay)	producer, camera operator
2011	Alicia Florrick: Real Deal	The Good Wife (2011, R. King, M. King)	director, producer, camera operator
2010	Rise and Rise Again: Making Ridley Scott's Robin Hood	Robin Hood (2010, R. Scott)	producer, camera operator
2010	Alien^{3}: Assembly Cut	Alien^{3} (1992 / 2003 / 2010, Fincher)	restoration producer
2010	Wreckage and Rage: Making Alien³ (Uncut)	Alien³ (1992, Fincher)	director, producer, writer
2009	The Human Factor: Exacting Revenge of the Fallen	Transformers: Revenge of the Fallen (2009, Bay)	producer, camera operator
2009	Not A Love Story: Making (500) Days of Summer	(500) Days of Summer (2009, Webb)	producer
2008	Fallen Empire: Making American Gangster	American Gangster (2007, R. Scott)	producer, written by, camera operator,^{†}director
2008	Flights of Fancy: The Politics and Paranoia of Capricorn One	Capricorn One (1978, Hyams)	producer
2007	Blade Runner: The Final Cut	Blade Runner (1982, R. Scott)	restoration producer
2007	Dangerous Days: Making Blade Runner	Blade Runner (1982, R. Scott)	director, producer, camera operator
2007	Secrets from Another Place: Creating Twin Peaks	Twin Peaks (1990, Lynch)	director, producer, writer
2006	The Path to Redemption	Kingdom of Heaven (2005, R. Scott)	director, producer, camera operator
2006	Ride with the Angels: Making Blue Thunder	Blue Thunder (1983, Badham)	director, producer
2005	Strength and Honor: Creating the World of Gladiator	Gladiator (2000, R. Scott)	director, producer
2005	Vengeance Is Mine: Reinventing Man on Fire	Man on Fire (2004, T. Scott)	producer, writer
2005	Kingdom of Heaven: Interactive Production Grid	Kingdom of Heaven (2005, R. Scott)	director, producer, camera operator
2004	Danger Zone: The Making of Top Gun	Top Gun (1986, T. Scott)	producer
2004	Making the Amazing	Spider-Man 2 (2004, Raimi)	director, producer, writer
2004	Tricks of the Trade: Making Matchstick Men	Matchstick Men (2003, R. Scott)	director, producer, cinematographer
2003	Alien Quadrilogy: The Beast Within: The Making of Alien; Superior Firepower: The Making of Aliens; The Making of Alien³; One Step Beyond: The Making of Alien: Resurrection	Alien (1979, R. Scott); Aliens (1986, Cameron); Alien³ (1992, Fincher); Alien Resurrection (1997, Jeunet)	director, producer, writer, camera operator director, producer, writer^{‡}director,^{‡}producer,^{‡}writer director, producer, writer
2003	Thelma & Louise: The Last Journey	Thelma & Louise (1991, R. Scott)	director, producer, writer
2003	Inside Die Another Day	Die Another Day (2002, Tamahori)	producer
2002	Duelling Directors: Ridley Scott & Kevin Reynolds	The Duellists (1977, R. Scott)	director, producer, camera operator
2002	The Essence of Combat: Making Black Hawk Down	Black Hawk Down (2001, R. Scott)	producer
2002	Inside Speed	Speed (1994, de Bont)	director, producer, written by
2002	Legend: The Director's Cut	Legend (1985, R. Scott)	restoration producer
2001	Breaking the Silence: The Making of Hannibal	Hannibal (2001, R. Scott)	director, producer
2000	Style as Substance: Reflections on Tarsem	The Cell (2000, Singh)	producer
			^{†}uncredited^{‡}credited as "Fredrick Garvin"
