= Priscilla Atkins =

Aboriginal Australian leader and television producer

- Other names: Priscilla Collins, Cilla Atkins
- Occupations: Indigenous rights activist; advocate; television producer
- Known for: Chief Executive Officer of the North Australian Aboriginal Justice Agency

Priscilla Atkins, formerly Collins, is a prominent Aboriginal Australian leader, advocate, and television producer. Atkins was the chief executive officer of the North Australian Aboriginal Justice Agency (NAAJA), the largest law firm in the Northern Territory of Australia.

== Early life ==
Priscilla Atkins, formerly Priscilla Collins and known as "Cilla", is an Eastern Arrernte woman of Arabana descent in South Australia and grew up in Alice Springs in Central Australia, the eldest of five children and is a descendant of Topsy Smith (née White) the daughter of Mary Kemp (Arabana) and George White, a policeman. Topsy Smith was the mother to daughter Ada Mary Wade.

== Career ==
Atkins is an outspoken advocate on issues affecting Aboriginal people across the Northern Territory, including the overrepresentation of Aboriginal people in prison, overcrowding and homelessness, and problems in the Northern Territory Government's mismanagement of remote public housing.

Atkins was the chief executive officer of the North Australian Aboriginal Justice Agency (NAAJA), an Aboriginal and Torres Strait Islander legal service, which is also the largest law firm in the Northern Territory.

She is a non-member director of the Danila Dilba Health Service. She was previously the chief executive officer of the Central Australian Aboriginal Media Association (CAAMA), Australia's largest Aboriginal media organisation. Atkins was heavily involved in the establishment of National Indigenous Television, Australia's first Indigenous television station. She has been on the boards of Indigenous Business Australia, Imparja Television, National Indigenous Television Service and Indigenous Screen Australia, MusicNT, and was chairperson of the Australian Indigenous Communications Association.

=== Film and TV production ===
Atkins has produced television documentaries for SBS and ABC Television. When her children commented that her documentaries were "boring" she decided to make a children's television show. She was the executive producer and creator of Double Trouble, the first Indigenous children's television series produced for a commercial network, Channel Nine and Disney. Double Trouble was nominated for an Australian Film Institute Award in 2008 for Best Children’s Drama.

She was production manager on the 1991 documentary film Satellite Dreaming, about the development of media by and for Indigenous Australians.

== Recognition and awards ==
Atkins was awarded the Businesswoman's Award for Community and Government in 2011.

== Personal life ==
Atkins has ten children.
