= Jandamarra's War =

- Written by: Mitch Torres
- Directed by: Mitch Torres
- Country of origin: Australia
- Original language: English

Production
- Producers: Andrew Ogilvie; Andrea Quesnelle; Eileen Torres
- Cinematography: Allan Collins; Jim Frater; Rusty Geller
- Editor: Lawrie Silvestrin
- Running time: 55 minutes

Original release
- Release: 12 May 2011

Jandamarra's War is a 2011 Australian drama style documentary that tells the story of Jandamarra, a famous Aboriginal Australian warrior of the Bunuba people from Western Australia.

== Synopsis ==
Jandamarra's War begins by detailing Jandamarra's early years, starting with his birth in 1873 and he and his mother Jinny's relocation when he was around the age of seven where he looked after cattle at the station at Lennard River Flats, for safety at a time when European colonists were frequently killing Aboriginal Australians. As a teenager, he left the cattle station with his Uncle Ellemarra to be initiated in Bunuba Law, but when they are caught spearing sheep both are sent to prison. After he left prison, he was expelled from Bunuba society for sleeping with other men's women and soon after he became friends with a policeman named Richardson. Later he killed Richardson, marking the beginning of his three-year war against the Europeans.

In 1894, Jandamarra led a rebellion against invading European pastoralists in order to defend Bunuba land and culture.

Jandamarra spent the last few years of his life hiding in his spirit country, Djumbud. His incredible ability to outwit police officers lead many to believe he had magical powers and many pastoralists left the Kimberley area for fear of him. His life ended when he was shot dead by Mungo Micki, an Aboriginal tracker.

== Cast ==
- Darcy Anderson as Fred Edgar
- Juliette Beurteaux as Lukin
- Emmanuel J. Brown as Lilimarra
- Gabriel Brown as Baby Jandamarra
- Tamara Cherel as Mayannie
- Grant Currie as Drewry
- Ernie Dingo as Narrator (voice)
- Peter Docker as Richardson
- Bevan Green as Young Jandamarra
- Andy Hallen as Forester
- Keithan Holloway as Jandamarra
- Stanley Jangary Snr. as Ellemarra
- Kaylene Marr as Jinny
- Jack Mccale as Micki
- Blythe McGuckin as Blythe
- Craig Snell as Gibbs
- Kurt Wheatley as Constable Pilmer
- Brendon Williams as Captain
- Bruce Williams as Jim Crowe
- Matt Wood as Nicholson

== Production ==
=== Script ===
Director and scriptwriter Mitch Torres wanted the film to portray the story of Jandamarra as accurately as possible, noting that:

Outsiders often misrepresent Jandamarra as an outlaw. I learnt that the reasons he fought the settlers were more complicated. The Bunuba wanted the real story told and I wanted to make a film that was inspired by those who are very proud of this warrior. A legend was born with Jandamarra’s death that remains etched in the minds of those who make up today’s Bunuba community. For them, he wasn’t a criminal; he was a resistance fighter and a hero.
In writing the script, I discovered Jandamarra was a product of a very traumatic period in the settlement of North Western Australia. He was very young when he rebelled against the settlers who had raised him in the ways of the white man. He was also somebody who was before his time, a philosopher, a tough but very intelligent man, who saw his world falling down around him and who wanted to do something about it, even though it would lead to an early death. I wanted to make a film that depicted Jandamarra not only as a hero who fought the cruelties and injustices suffered by his people at the hands of the settlers, but also as somebody who was very human.

— Mitch Torres, Australian Broadcasting Corporation.

=== Filming ===
Principal filming took place over ten days in June 2010 and most of the film's scenes were shot on Bunuba land in locations close to where the historical events being reenacted actually occurred.

== Reviews ==
Jim Schembri wrote in The Age that "historical documentaries are at their best when they illuminate a little known narrative rather than merely recite a famous one. Hopefully, it will only be a matter of time before some wily filmmakers seize on the potential to develop Jandamarra's story into a full-blown feature film".

== Awards ==
Ceremony	Category	Result
AACTA Awards	Best Documentary Under One Hour	Won
AACTA Awards	Best Cinematography in a Documentary	Nominated
AACTA Awards	Best Sound in a Documentary	Nominated

== See also ==
- Jandamarra
