= Foreshadowing (disambiguation) =

Foreshadowing is a literary technique.

Foreshadowing or The Foreshadowing may also refer to:

- Foreshadowing Our Demise, second album of Skinless, a rock band
- The Foreshadowing (band), an Italian metal band
- The Foreshadowing (novel), by Marcus Sedgwick

== See also ==
- Foreshadow (disambiguation)
