= Jenny Apostolou =

Australian actress

Jenny Apostolou (also known as Jen Apostolou) is an Australian actress who is best known for her roles in the television series TwentyfourSeven and the children's television series Double Trouble. She has been active since 1996. Apostolou has also had a number of roles in other television series such as Out of the Blue, Water Rats, Heartbreak High, Police Rescue, G.P. and The Ferals.
