= Das Fest des Huhnes =

- Directed by: Walter Wippersberg
- Produced by: Wolfgang Ainberger; Peter Wustinger
- Starring: Frank Oladeinde
- Release date: 1992
- Running time: 55 minutes
- Country: Austria
- Language: German

Das Fest des Huhnes (German for The festival of the chicken) is a 1992 Austrian film, directed by Walter Wippersberg. It is a production of the ORF local studio in Oberösterreich, for the series "Kunst-Stücke" (Art-Works).

== Plot ==
The morals and customs of the "native peoples" of Upper Austria are described by a team of anthropologists from Sub-Saharan Africa in the style of European and American anthropologists in the non-western world. While making the film, they discover new cultural phenomena. Wippersberg turns around the research methodology of Western anthropologists of performing ethnologic studies, and then popularising them by means of a documentary film.

The name of the film derives from the discovery that the researchers made, that the churches were vacated, but the locals instead tend to gather in large tents, and drink a yellowish fluid by the litre, while primarily eating chicken and then engaging in a Chicken Dance. The researchers come to the conclusion that the chicken has taken the religious-sacrificial role of the lamb.

== Reviews ==
- The Austrian newspaper Der Standard claims, "The film presents a wonderfully foreign view of Austrian life (in Upper Austria), with its distanced scientific perspective of an ethnologist. The sarcastic and perfectly developed counterpoint of picture and sound melts into an ironic unity."
- The Austrian newspaper Kurier claims, "Possibly the most original, meanest show broadcast by ORF in 1992; the parody of chauvinistic, interpret-everything expedition films, has reached cult status."

== See also ==
- BabaKiueria, similar Australian film
