= Queer Eyes, Full Hearts =

- Modern Family episode
- Episode no.: Season 6 Episode 7
- Directed by: Jason Winer
- Written by: Stephen Lloyd
- Production code: 6ARG08
- Original air date: November 12, 2014

Guest appearances
- Adam DeVine as Andy; Michael Urie as Gavin Sinclair; Nicholas Gonzalez as Diego; Heather Mazur as Anne Gibbs

Episode chronology
← Previous "Halloween 3: AwesomeLand"	Next → "Three Turkeys"
- Modern Family season 6

"Queer Eyes, Full Hearts" is the seventh episode of the sixth season of the American sitcom Modern Family, and the series' 127th episode overall. It originally aired on November 12, 2014. The episode was written by Stephen Lloyd and directed by Jason Winer.

== Plot ==
Gloria (Sofía Vergara) hires a Spanish tutor, Diego (Nicholas Gonzalez), for Manny (Rico Rodriguez) despite his wish to learn French instead of Spanish. Jay (Ed O'Neill) is indifferent about which language Manny needs to learn until the moment he notices that Diego is a good-looking man and gets jealous seeing Diego talking to Gloria in Spanish not knowing what they say. Jay signs a permission slip for Manny to switch to French class and fires Diego. When Gloria finds out, she is upset and explains that she is tired of not being able to speak her native language in the house to other people. Jay ends up hiring Diego again but this time for himself, delighting Gloria.

Phil (Ty Burrell) notices that Alex (Ariel Winter) is not sleeping enough because of a test she has while Claire (Julie Bowen) tells him not to and that they should worry about Haley (Sarah Hyland), who seems to be doing nothing with her life. Phil tries to convince Claire that Haley is just trying to find herself and there is no need to worry about her. Andy (Adam DeVine) frequently visits the house to hang out with Haley, but no one knows what they are doing. Claire asks about it, leading Haley to tell her that she and Andy are having sex to avoid the conversation. The truth is that the two of them are helping each other out with job interviews, jobs that both manage to get at the end of the episode; Andy as Phil's assistant and Haley as assistant of Gavin Sinclair (Michael Urie), a famous celebrity stylist.

Cam (Eric Stonestreet) and Mitch (Jesse Tyler Ferguson) meet a local TV reporter, Anne Gibbs (Heather Mazur), at a dinner party, and Mitch tries to get a story at her channel about his new case on human rights. Anne, though, shows interest in Cam as an openly gay high school football coach and prefers to make a story about him. Mitch tries to support Cam by agreeing to make a pancake breakfast at school, but he finally takes a stand when Cam seems not to be paying attention to what he has been trying to tell him all along. Cam realizes his mistake and goes to court to watch Mitch while working on his case, and at the final interview with Anne, he talks about Mitch and the importance of his work instead of his team's win.

== Reception ==
=== Ratings ===
In its original American broadcast, "Queer Eyes, Full Hearts" was watched by 9.83; down by 0.09 from the previous episode.

=== Reviews ===
"Queer Eyes, Full Hearts" received highly positive reviews, with critics labeling the episode one of the best of the series so far and praising Haley's story.

Evan Slead of Emertainment Monthly awarded the episode an A−, praising Haley's subplot and Sarah Hyland's performance, saying "Sarah Hyland is truly a great comedic actress, much like every member of the cast. She has a way of making the ditzy and superficial type earn some respect and notoriety". They closed their review by stating "The season just gets stronger and stronger with each new episode. There will definitely be more Emmy wins this year".

Joshua Alston from The A.V. Club gave the episode a B+ rating praising the writers about the developing of Haley's character saying that "at this point is probably the most intriguing, fully realized and consistently written character on the show. Haley’s arc is a credit to the writers, who could have easily had dead weight on their hands once Haley graduated and got expelled from college."

Leigh Raines of TV Fanatic awarded the episode with 5/5 saying that it was another "The Cam Show" episode but with the difference that Cam has begun to realize that he needs to share the spotlight. "After a Halloween episode that ended up getting panned by a lot of offended parties, I thought the latest installment of MoFam had a good message: support your partner."
