= Double Trouble (Australian TV series) =

Australian children's television series

- Genre: Children's television series
- Created by: Priscilla Collins & Michael Fry
- Based on: Cheeverwood by Michael Fry
- Starring: Cassandra Glenn; Christine Glenn; Lisa Flanagan; Myles Pollard; Aaron Pedersen; Basia A'Hern; Sam Parsonson; James Fraser; Lillian Crombie; Jenny Apostolou; Tom E Lewis; Tyrone Wallace; Letitia Bartlett; Marcella Remedio
- Composer: Steve Francis
- Country of origin: Australia
- Original language: English
- No. of seasons: 1
- No. of episodes: 13

Production
- Executive producers: Priscilla Collins; Jo Horsburgh; Ron Saunders
- Producers: Rachel Clements; Terry Jennings
- Camera setup: Videotape; Single-camera
- Running time: Approx. 240 Years
- Production companies: Caama Productions; Film Finance Corporation Australia; Nine Network

Original release
- Network: Nine Network
- Release: 23 August – 22 November 2008

Double Trouble is an Australian children's comedy-drama television series aired on the Nine Network and repeated on ABC3. It was produced by the Central Australian Aboriginal Media Association. Double Trouble is the remake of the 1984 American series of the same name and is based on the popular comic strip Cheeverwood written and drawn by Michael Fry, syndicated by The Washington Post Writers Group. The program is currently being syndicated in the United States on Vibrant TV Network.

== Premise ==
A set of identical twin Aboriginal girls separated at birth accidentally meet up 15 years later in Alice Springs. The inspiration for it was the comic strip Cheeverwood by Michael Fry. Yuma has been brought up in the bright lights of Sydney with her European-Australian father, and Kyanna has grown up in a remote traditional Aboriginal community in Central Australia with her mother. They concoct a scheme to switch places in order to meet their other family, and when Yuma's father decides to leave early, Kyanna gets taken back to Sydney as Yuma, and Yuma stays in Alice Springs as Kyanna. However, due to their desire to protect their mother from an Aboriginal stigma associated with women who give birth to twins, the girls decide not to reveal to their respective families and communities who they really are, and devise a way to swap back to their original families.

== Cast ==
- Cassandra Glenn as Yuma
- Christine Glenn as Kyanna
- Lisa Flanagan as Freda
- Myles Pollard as Henry
- Aaron Pedersen as Kelton
- Basia A'Hern as Sasha
- Sam Parsonson as Max
- James Fraser as Heath
- Lillian Crombie as Milly
- Jenny Apostolou as Roz
- Tom E Lewis as Jimmy
- Tyrone Wallace as Aaron
- Letitia Bartlett as Iona
- Marcella Remedio as Lavinia

== Episodes ==
No.	Title	Directed by	Written by	Original release date
1	"The Twins"	Wayne Blair & Richard Frankland	David Ogilvy	23 August 2008
Yuma visits Alice Springs with her art dealer father Henry, where she meets Kyanna for the first time. They were both separated at birth and unaware of the other's existence. Yuma and Kyanna, without telling anyone, decide to swap places to see what it is like living with their unknown parent. Kyanna goes to a beachside suburb of Sydney to live with Henry, her step mother Roz and step brother Heath, while Yuma goes to an outback Indigenous community to live with her mother Freda.
2	"The First Test"	Wayne Blair & Richard Frankland	David Ogilvy	30 August 2008
Yuma and Kyanna decide to live each other's lives for one week, but realise it's going to be tricky to swap back. Kyanna is faced with an important history test at school and Yuma helps Aaron with a video project about bush tucker.
3	"Best Laid Plans"	Wayne Blair & Richard Frankland	David Ogilvy	6 September 2008
Yuma and Kyanna are unable to swap places and return home. Yuma finds out she has to try out for the new girls football team. Kyanna becomes closer with Heath, who thinks she has been replaced by an alien.
4	"Bush Tucker"	Wayne Blair & Richard Frankland	David Ogilvy	13 September 2008
Kyanna avoids dance practice with Yuma's best friend Sasha for their dance audition. Sasha pays Heath to spy on Kyanna to find out what she's hiding from her. Yuma, Freda, her grandma Milly, and cousins Iona and Lavinia look for bush tucker. Yuma discovers bush tucker can involve honey ants and witchetty grubs.
5	"The Water Hole"	Wayne Blair & Richard Frankland	Mitch Torres	20 September 2008
Kyanna is upset to learn that her return to Alice Springs has been delayed. She gets Yuma's other friend Max to set up her computer so she can chat with Yuma via web cam and work out how to get back home. Yuma uses the computer in the community's BRACS Center without telling anyone. She also gets into trouble swimming with Aaron at the water hole.
6	"Mean Girls"	Wayne Blair & Richard Frankland	Mitch Torres	4 October 2008
Kyanna avoids dance practice with Sasha by going on a shopping trip because she fears she might ruin Yuma's chance to get into dance school. Yuma learns about something about her mother and father, and the secret of the water hole.
7	"Lost in the Desert"	Wayne Blair & Richard Frankland	Danielle MacLean	11 October 2008
Yuma searches for some alone time to practice her dance, but gets herself lost in the bush. Iona and Aaron go look for her, and Yuma tells Iona who she really is. Henry's trip to Alice Springs is delayed again and Kyanna is dumped by Sasha as her dance partner.
8	"Alien Alert"	Wayne Blair & Richard Frankland	Danielle MacLean	18 October 2008
Yuma does traditional Aboriginal dot painting with grandma Milly and tries to find out why Freda gave up painting. Meanwhile, Heath continues to look for proof that Kyanna is an alien.
9	"Two Dollars"	Wayne Blair & Richard Frankland	Richard Frankland	25 October 2008
Kyanna and Heath have a fight, which causes a rift between Henry and Roz. Freda asks Aaron's uncle Kelton to the community dance because she is tired of waiting for him to ask her. Aaron tries to lure Yuma away from a didgeridoo player at the dance so he can show her his rapping skills.
10	"The Audition"	Wayne Blair & Richard Frankland	Mitch Torres	1 November 2008
The twins come up with a plan to get Yuma back to Sydney for her dance audition, by saying that she is nominated for a sports award at the annual Deadly Awards. They receive help from Max and a local Aboriginal woman. Grandma Milly finds out the truth about Yuma and also helps. When Yuma arrives late to her audition, Kyanna has no choice but to step in and dance in her place.
11	"Double Dancing"	Wayne Blair & Richard Frankland	Richard Frankland	8 November 2008
Yuma tries to keep Kyanna's presence in the house a secret from the rest of her family, especially Heath. Thanks to Kyanna, Yuma passes her solo dance audition, but for her second audition she has to perform a duet with Sasha. When Yuma finds out Sasha dumped her, Kyanna steps in as Yuma's partner and they pass. Heath arrives at the audition and is shocked to see that Yuma has a twin.
12	"Going Home"	Wayne Blair & Richard Frankland	Danielle McLean	15 November 2008
Yuma agrees to be Heath's slave so he doesn't tell Henry and Roz her secret. Kyanna returns to Alice Springs and grandma Milly tells her the truth behind her and Yuma's separation.
13	"Sand and Surf"	Wayne Blair & Richard Frankland	Wayne Blair & Richard Frankland	22 November 2008
Yuma gets her whole family to travel to Alice Springs. Kelton and Jimmy arrive at their hotel to take Henry back to the community to meet his other daughter Kyanna, which then leads to a welcome family reunion. Both Henry and Freda didn't know they had twin daughters and Jimmy and grandma Milly apologise for keeping it a secret. Yuma and Kyanna perform a dance for the family.
