= Mitch Torres =

Aboriginal Australian actress and writer (born 1964)

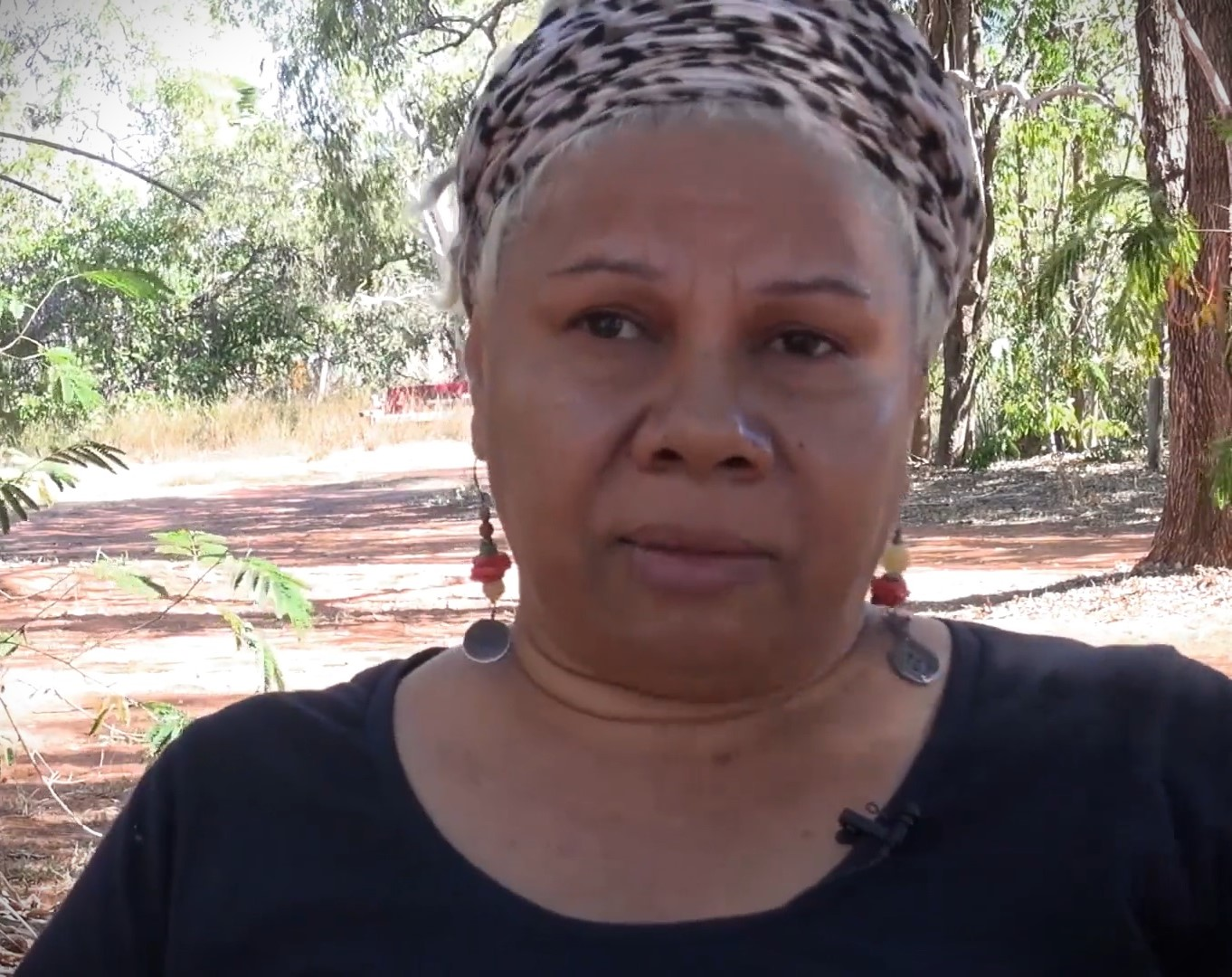
- Torres in 2018
- Born: Michelle Rose Torres; 1964 (age 61–62); Broome, Western Australia, Australia
- Other name: Michelle Torres-Hill
- Occupations: Actress, director, journalist, playwright, producer, radio presenter, and writer
- Years active: 1986–present
- Notable work: BabaKiueria (1986); Whispering in Our Hearts (2001); Muttacar Sorry Business (2002); Jandamarra's War (2011); Kriol Kitchen (2014-2015)

Michelle "Mitch" Rose Torres (born 1964), also credited as Michelle Torres-Hill, is an Australian actress, director, journalist, playwright, producer, radio presenter, and writer. She began as an actress, playing the main role in the 1986 film BabaKiueria. She then worked as a journalist, becoming the first Indigenous Australian on-air presenter for SBS Television, and worked at ABC Television. She then worked for Indigenous radio stations as a broadcaster, producer, and presenter. She moved into filmmaking in the mid-1990s, with her first short film Promise for SBS-TV. Among her works include the documentary Jandamarra's War and the play Muttacar Sorry Business.

Torres has received an AWGIE Award, Australian Academy of Cinema and Television Arts Award, Human Rights Award, and Australian Teachers of Media Awards for her work on The Circuit and Jandamarra's War. In 2021, she was awarded an honorary degree from the Australian Film, Television and Radio School.

== Early life and education ==
Michelle Rose Torres was born in 1964. She is of Djugun, Gooniyandi, Jabirr Jabirr, Walmadjari, and Yawuru descent from Broome, Western Australia. Her great-grandfather was a Filipino pearl diver, Catalino Torres, who married the Jabirr Jabirr woman Matilda Ida Tiolbadonga in 1898. A lover of dance, Torres studied at the Aboriginal Islander Dance Theatre, where she was able to attain her first acting role for The Fringe Dwellers. She played the role of Rosie in the 1990 theatrical production of Bran Nue Dae.

== Career ==
As of 2022, Torres had been in the media industry for over 35 years, with work in acting, directing, producing, writing, TV journalism, and presenting. Torres began her media career as an actor, with credits in The Fringe Dwellers and Tudawali. She played the central role in the 1986 mockumentary BabaKiueria as the reporter Duranga Manika, where she followed the lives of a "'typical' white family" and described a football match as "ritualised violence" and betting at the TAB as a religion. In 1988, she started working as a journalist, becoming the first Indigenous on-air presenter for SBS Television. Torres then entered the ABC Television cadetship program. She was the first presenter and a field journalist for GWN7's Millbindi program.

After work in television journalism, Torres worked as a broadcaster for Indigenous radio stations Goolari and WAAMA6NR, then for ABC Kimberley as the morning show's presenter and producer. Alongside her sister Ali Torres, she was the host for the National Indigenous Television program Kriol Kitchen. The series served to educate viewers on the traditional cuisines of the Kimberley Region and highlight some of the scenery of the region. Torres was the primary presenter, while Ali took a background role; in an interview with SBS Food Mitch was referred to as a "self-proclaimed damper destroyer".

In the mid-1990s, Torres moved to filmmaking. Her first short drama, Promise, was a contribution to the Shifting Sands Short Drama Initiative (SBS-TV). She then made documentaries such as Jandamarra's War and Whispering in our Hearts. She recalled stumbling across the lead actor for the former serendipitously whilst in the Muludja Aboriginal Community. By 2021, Torres was focusing on dramas, with previous work in documentaries and theatrical plays. She was credited as "Michelle Torres-Hill" in the 1990s.

In 2006, Torres and David Milroy wrote the theatrical production Muttacar Sorry Business with funding from the Insurance Commission of Western Australia. The show highlights social determinants including alcohol, risk-taking behaviours, and overcrowding and the resulting high incidence of road trauma among Indigenous communities. The production was expanded into Northern Territory's road safety programs.

In September 2020, Torres was selected as one of eight participants in a new writing and directing initiative organised by WA Indigenous production companies Pink Pepper and Ramu Productions, along with New Zealand company Brown Sugar Apple Grunt, called the RED project. The project consisted of development workshops enabling each participant to write and direct a 10-minute short film, which would be part of a single anthology 80-minute feature film (working title RED) consisting of stories from a female Aboriginal perspective. The other participants were Ngaire Pigram, Debbie Carmody, Kelli Cross, Karla Hart, Chantelle Murray, Jub Clerc, and Kodie Bedford.

== Personal life ==
Torres is the owner of the film company Nagarra Nagarra Film, which has collaborated with Ramu Productions for television series such as Seven. Alongside her sister Ali, she is the owner of Mijinalii, which specialises in soap, candle, and body products and worked in collaboration with the Maganda Makers Business Club. Torres' son Cornel Ozies works as a cinematographer and for his family's production company Wawili Pitjas. He previously worked on the sets of The Great Gatsby, The Sapphires, and Thor: Ragnarok. Torres is related to actresses Ningali Lawford and Shari Sebbens. In 2022, Torres was appointed to the Arts and Culture Trust Board, which replaced the Perth Theatre Trust. She served as an ambassador in 2022 for the CinefestOZ film festival.

== Works ==
=== Acting credits ===
Year	Title	Role	Ref.
1986	Babakiueria	Duranga Manika	
1986	The Fringe Dwellers	Audrena	
1987	Slate, Wyn & Me	Daphne	
1987	Tudawali	Kate Wilson	
1988	Emerald City	Kath	
1990	Don't Tell Her It's Me	Ticket Agent	

=== Filmmaking credits ===
Year	Title	Director	Writer	Notes	Ref.
1998	Promise	Yes	Yes		
2000	Behind the Ball	Yes			
2001	Whispering in Our Hearts: Uncovering the Mowla Bluff Massacre	Yes			
2001	Saltwater Bluesman	Yes	Yes		
2002	One Day in '67		Yes	Play	
2002	Muttacar Sorry Business	Yes	Yes	With David Milroy	
2005	Case 442 – A Son's Journey to Find His Mother	Yes	Yes		
2007–2009	The Circuit		Yes	Dir. Beck Cole and Kelly Lefever, Series 1 and 2	
2007	Bollywood Dreaming		Yes	Dir. Cornel Ozies	
2007	Jarlmadangah: Our Dream Our Reality	Yes	Yes		
2007	Double Trouble		Yes	with David Ogilvy, episodes 5, 6, 10	
2010	Nyirr Marie	Yes	Yes		
2010	Keepers of the Story: Jandamarra	Yes	Yes		
2010	Lookin from the River Out		Yes		
2011	Jandamarra's War	Yes	Yes		
2016	Willis Yu	Yes	Yes		
2016	Rosie Mulligan	Yes			

== Recognition and awards ==
In 2021, in recognition of her work in the field, Torres was presented with an honorary doctorate from the Australian Film, Television and Radio School.

Year	Nominated Work	Award	Category	Result	Source
2007	The Circuit	AWGIE Awards	Television Award — Mini Series Original	Nominated	
2007	The Circuit	Deadly Sounds Aboriginal and Torres Strait Islander Music, Sport, Entertainment and Community Awards	Excellence in Film & Theatrical Score	Won	
2007	The Circuit	Australian Film Institute Television Awards	Best Screenplay in Television	Nominated	
2007	The Circuit	Human Rights Award	Television Award	Won	
2009	The Circuit (Series 2)	AWGIE Awards	Television Award — Mini-series - Original	Won	
2010	The Circuit (Series 2)	Australian Film Institute Television Awards	Best Television Drama Series	Nominated	
2011	Jandamarra's War	Deadly Sounds Aboriginal and Torres Strait Islander Music, Sport, Entertainment and Community Awards	Film of the Year	Nominated	
2011	Jandamarra's War	Australian Teachers of Media Awards	Best Docudrama	Won	
2011	Jandamarra's War	Australian Teachers of Media Awards	Best Documentary Biography	Won	
2011	Jandamarra's War	Australian Academy of Cinema and Television Arts Awards	Best Documentary Under One Hour	Won	
