= Crave (film) =

- Directed by: Charles de Lauzirika
- Written by: Robert A. Lawton, Charles de Lauzirika
- Starring: Josh Lawson, Emma Lung, Ron Perlman
- Cinematography: William Eubank
- Edited by: David Crowther
- Music by: Justin Caine Burnett
- Production companies: Iron Helmet, Another Green World Productions
- Distributed by: Phase 4 Films
- Release dates: July 24, 2012 (Fantasia International Film Festival); December 6, 2013 (United States)
- Running time: 113 minutes
- Country: United States
- Language: English

Crave (also known under the working titles of Shatterbrain and Two Wolves) is a 2012 American drama thriller film directed by Charles de Lauzirika. The film stars Josh Lawson as a man who retreats into a fantasy world that comes with deadly consequences. Crave had its world premiere on July 24, 2012 at the Fantasia International Film Festival and had a wider theatrical and video on demand release on December 6, 2013.

== Synopsis ==
Aiden (Josh Lawson) is an underpaid and lonely freelance crime scene photographer in Detroit who copes with the world around him by imagining himself as a hero who saves the day. His world is turned upside down when he meets Virginia (Emma Lung), who lives a few doors down in the same apartment building and has recently left a turbulent relationship and breathes new life into Aiden's daily routine and gives him a new sense of confidence. This gives him the courage to make his daydreams into a reality, which comes with some negative repercussions as Aiden's sense of justice might be considered warped. He gets robbed at gunpoint in a convenience store and after the assailant escapes and discards his gun, Aiden finds and keeps it. He begins a sexual relationship with Virginia and very quickly becomes obsessed with her.

As the hired photographer at the 16th birthday party of the daughter of a wealthy but obnoxious businessman, Barry Endicott, Aiden spots him flirting and attempting to seduce some of the teenage guests. Aiden spies on and follows Endicott to a motel in Windsor, Ontario where he photographs him meeting for a sexual affair with one of his daughter's underage friends and Aiden later blackmails him.

Aiden's desires to be a hero and fantasies about killing people who annoy him start to concern him and he confides in his friend, Police supervisor Pete (Ron Perlman) who reassures him that everybody has these thoughts but doesn't follow through with them. While on a date with Virginia at a theatrical play performed by some of her friends, Aiden's thoughts become reality when he accidentally heckles them, embarrassing and angering Virginia who blocks him on social media and refuses to speak to him. Using the money he got from blackmailing Endicott, Aiden buys a gift for her but she rebuffs him, telling him that she feels uncomfortable around him and she needs space.

He follows her to an industrial area where, to his disappointment, he finds that she has rekindled her relationship with her boyfriend Ravi (Edward Furlong). Aiden confronts Ravi and accidentally kills him but makes it look as though a homeless junkie killed him in a bad drug deal. A heartbroken Virginia discovers the crime scene and attends his funeral. Later on, Aiden and Virginia meet in the elevator of their building where he attempts to console her. After, in his apartment, he gets a knock at his door, presumably from Virginia.

== Cast ==
- Josh Lawson as Aiden
- Emma Lung as Virginia
- Ron Perlman as Pete
- Edward Furlong as Ravi
- Christopher Stapleton as Barry
- Jordan Trovillion as Young Emily
- Richard Speight Jr. as Rupert

== Production ==
Lauzirika came up with the idea for Crave while working on an unrelated film, an adaptation of Philip K. Dick's I Hope I Shall Arrive Soon. Dick's daughter, Isa Dick Hackett, encouraged Lauzirika to make a smaller film before beginning the larger project and Lauzirika's former neighbor Robert Lawton pitched him the premise of Crave. The idea was that the film would be "Travis Bickle meets Walter Mitty" and Lauzirika and Lawton worked on developing the film's script and main character for two months, during which point each man wrote two drafts of the script. Lauzirika based part of Aiden's relationship with Virginia upon his own experiences, which he felt made the movie "a little more interesting and a little more human". He also chose to leave the film's ending deliberately ambiguous, as he did have a set interpretation of the ending but liked the idea of multiple interpretations as he feels that "it’s much more interesting to leave the theater with a question so people leave talking about it rather than having the answer handed to you on a silver platter". Josh Lawson was brought in to portray Aiden, which Lauzirika felt made the character "more human and likable", which he believed made the character's interactions with Lung's character more explainable. Furlong was not initially considered for the role of Ravi, but was hired upon the recommendation of the movie's costume designer Oakley Stevenson.

Crave was initially written and planned to be shot in New York City, but moved the film's setting and shooting location to Detroit due to Michigan's tax incentives for filmmakers. Lauzirika had some initial hesitations over this shift, but later felt that the move was appropriate as Detroit was "a good match for Aiden" and was very photogenic. Filming took place during late 2009, but experienced some setbacks during filming, as a scene that was to be set on the Detroit People Mover was canceled at the last minute due to concerns over the film's violent and sexual content.

== Reception ==
Throughout most of its film festival run, critical reaction to the film was largely positive. Ain't It Cool News said it was "a remarkable first film" and that it "gets under the skin the way the best character movies do," while Badass Digest called it, "smart, thoughtful, bloody and funny. An excellent and assured directorial debut." Famous Monsters of Filmland gave the film a 9 out of 10 score, saying that "Lauzirika’s directs with such confidence that he is able take themes that we’ve seen time and again and make them fresh and entertaining." Variety's less enthusiastic review said that "Lauzirika’s accomplished debut feature is too funny and self-aware to be disturbing, but it’s certainly memorable." Fangoria called Crave "the kind of tough, uncompromising character study that Hollywood used to turn out with regularity, and should be supported and treasured when it appears today." Bloody Disgusting gave the film four stars and said, "it's like nothing I've seen before. A great film." Complex claimed that "Crave signals the arrival of an attention-demanding filmmaker who's schooled in the down and dirty noir tropes of old but possesses more than enough ingenuity to avoid copycat status."

In the wake of the film's theatrical and on demand release, reaction became more mixed. The film holds a rating of 29% on Rotten Tomatoes based upon 17 reviews, which do not include any of the film's festival reviews. Shock Till You Drop gave a predominantly positive review, saying that it was a "taut, twisted tale" and that it was "about all of us in a way, but especially the ones who get lost along the way." The Village Voice criticized Lawson's character as a "jerk" and didn't feel that his motivation for vigilantism was believable in comparison to anti-hero characters such as Falling Down's Foster. Collider opined that the movie "does have a relatable and worthwhile issue worth exploring" but that "Lauzirika is always going big yet going nowhere". Twitch Film panned the movie overall, criticizing Furlong as the film's weakest link while also stating that his character gave the reviewer his favorite moment of the film.

=== Awards ===
- New Flesh Award for Best First Feature, Fantasia International Film Festival (2012, won)
- Next Wave Award for Best Director, Fantastic Fest (2012, won)
- Best Editing Award, Toronto After Dark Film Festival (2012, won)
- Best Title Sequence (closing credits), Toronto After Dark Film Festival (2012, won)
