= Myles Pollard =

Australian actor

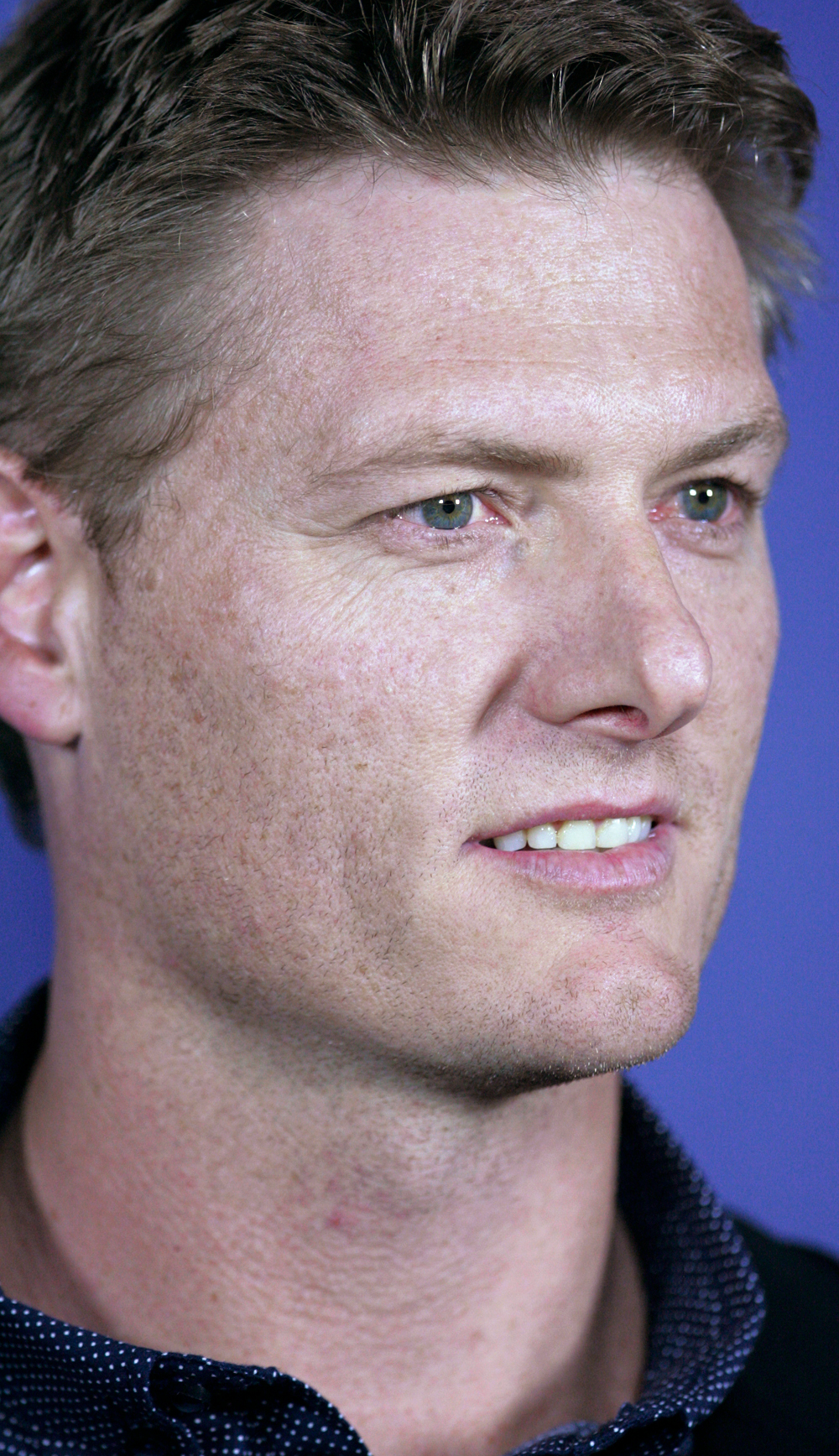
- Myles Pollard in April 2013
- Born: 4 November 1972 (age 53); Perth, Western Australia
- Occupation: Actor
- Spouse: Brigitta Wuthe (m. 2006)
- Children: Ronin Wilson Pollard (b. 2007)

Myles Pollard (born 4 November 1972) is an Australian actor. He is known for his role as Dr. James Edmunds in Home and Away and previously Nick Ryan on the TV series McLeod's Daughters.

== Early life ==
Myles Pollard was born in Perth, and grew up in remote communities in Western Australia, where his father was a school principal and his mother taught music. Although they moved every two to five years, Pollard spent the latter part of his high-school years in Perth. He graduated from university with a Bachelor of Arts in Education (English and Drama) in 1994.

== Career ==
After university, Pollard moved to Sydney to begin an acting career. He performed King Lear at the New Theatre and auditioned for NIDA the following year. He was accepted into their three-year program, graduating in 1998.

His break-out role was on McLeod's Daughters (2001-2006), where he received a Silver Logie Award nomination for Most Popular Actor at the 2003 Australian TV Week Logie Awards. In 2005, he announced that he was leaving the show to pursue other opportunities in the USA. His character, Nick Ryan was supposedly killed in a plane crash. But after several episodes he returned having been in a coma and not on the flight after all. Yet he and Tess departed two episodes later, in order for him to take a new job in Argentina, never to be seen on the show again.

Pollard has also had roles on the television shows Wildside, Invincible, Godzilla, Home and Away, All Saints, and Double Trouble. After his first job, on Wildside, he toured with Bell Shakespeare in a version of Romeo and Juliet that explored themes of racism in Australia.

== Personal life ==
Pollard played water polo for two years in 1989/90 and 1990/91 with Triton Water Polo Club in Perth, Western Australia. He married Brigitta Wuthe in 2006. Their son, Ronin Wilson Pollard, was born in 2007. He lives in the Western Australian town of Dunsborough. He now has a part-time job as an English relief teacher at various schools within the South-West of Western Australia, most notably he has worked at both Busselton Senior High School and Cape Naturaliste College.

== Filmography ==
=== Film ===
Year	Title	Role	Notes
2008	Four	Vincent	Short film
2009	X-Men Origins: Wolverine	Phelan	
2010	Tucker and Dale vs Evil	Hillbilly Kid	
2012	Thirst	Boyce	
2013	Drift	Andy Kelly	Also producer
2013	The Turning	Dan	
2013	Foreshadow	Detective Michael Monaghan	
2015	Looking for Grace	Bruce	
2018	The Gateway	Matt	
2018	Inside Water	The Man	Short
2019	Danger Close: The Battle of Long Tan	Flight Lieutenant Frank Riley	
2022	How to Please a Woman	Richard	
2023	Frank and Frank	Frank	
2024	Frederickstown	Jimmy	

=== Television ===
Year	Title	Role	Notes
1997	The Tower	Gilbert	TV movie
1999	All Saints	Robert Ford	Episode: "Get a Life"; Episode: "An Irish Lullaby"
1999	Wildside	Roger Parnesi	Episode: "2.17"
1999	Water Rats	Robert Haig	Episode: "Free as a Bird"
2001	Playing Hard to Get	Boyfriend	Video short
2001	Invincible	Paul Beck	TV movie
2001-2006	McLeod's Daughters	Nick Ryan	124 episodes (main series 1-5; guest series 6)
2007	Home and Away	Dane Jordans	9 episodes
2008	Packed to the Rafters	Paul	Episode: "Removing the Block"
2008	Double Trouble	Henry	13 episodes
2009	Underbelly	Phil De La Salle	4 episodes
2009	East West 101	John Woodhouse	Episode: "The Lost Boy"
2010	Rescue: Special Ops	Steve 'Mack' Macpherson	4 episodes
2011	Sea Patrol	Stuart White	Episode: "Spoils of War"; Episode: "The Hunted"
2015	Home and Away	James Edmunds	Recurring; 42 episodes
2020	Mystery Road	Dominic	Episode: "The Flare"
2020	The Heights	Anton	1 episode
2021	Itch	James	1 episode
2024	The Twelve	Neal Collins	4 episodes
2025	Invisible Boys	Jack Hammersmith	TV series:6 episodes
