= TwentyfourSeven =

TwentyfourSeven was an Australian television series that first screened on SBS in 2002. The series revolves around the lives of the young editorial team who work in the office of an entertainment magazine called 'TwentyfourSeven'.

It was an interactive series that let viewers manipulate the direction of storylines. The series was written on a Monday, shot on a Tuesday and screened on a Wednesday.

The series was produced by Hal and Di McElroy, who also produced another interactive series on SBS called Going Home.

== Cast ==
=== Main / regular ===
- Jenny Apostolou as Joanna Pappas, News / Features Editor
- John Atkinson as Nick Kaldor, Chief / Sub-Production Editor
- Caroline Brazier as Georgia Leighton-Smith, Fashion / Style Editor
- David Callan as Robert James Fraser, Editor
- Hayley McElhinney as Ellie Moore, Editor's Assistant
- Josh Lawson as Tony White, Art Director
- Rockell Williamson as Skye Hadley, Receptionist

== See also ==
- List of Australian television series
