= Josh Lawson =

Australian actor (born 1981)

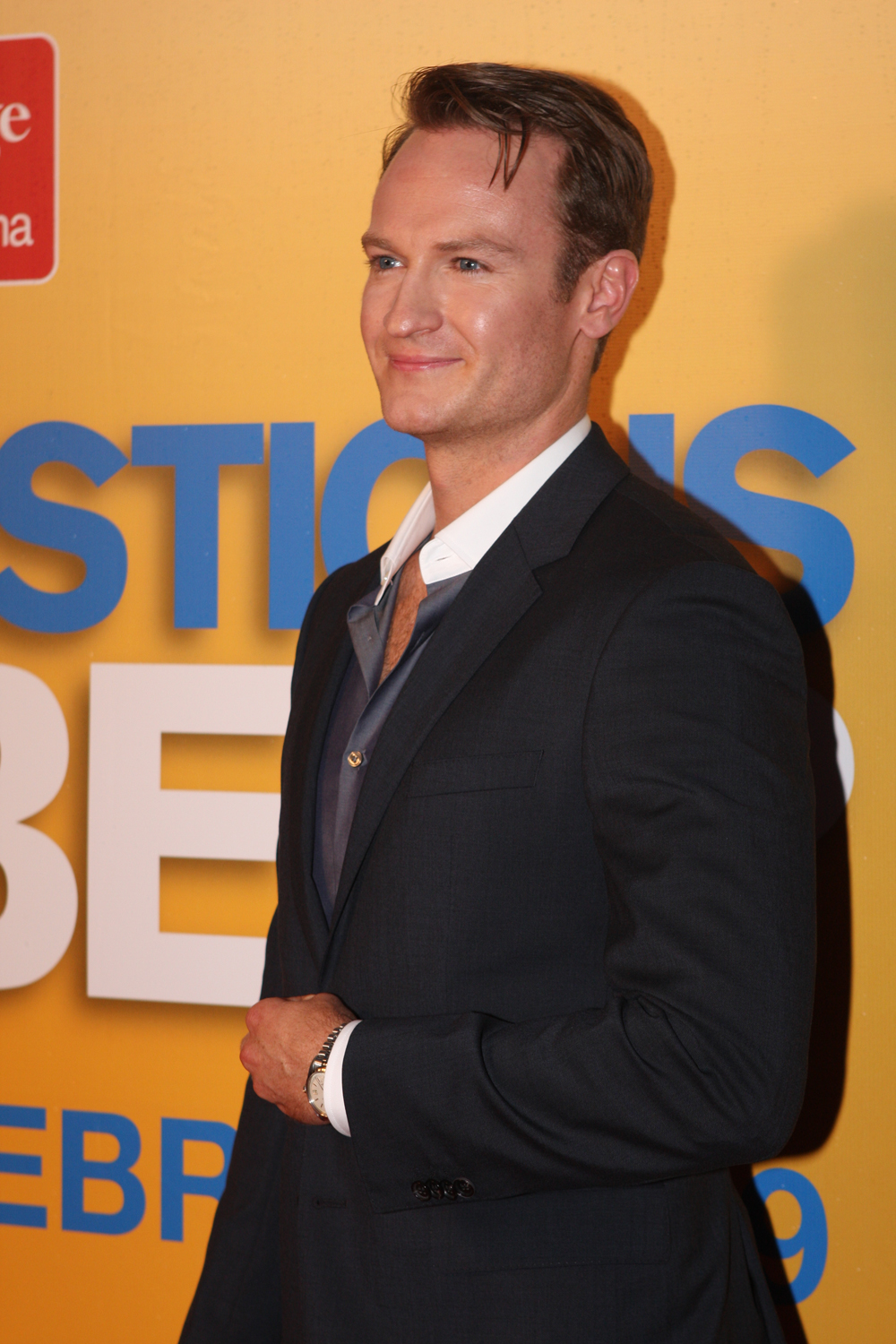
- Lawson at the Sydney premiere of Any Questions for Ben? in 2012
- Born: 22 July 1981 (age 45); Brisbane, Queensland, Australia
- Occupation: Actor
- Years active: 1997–present
- Family: Ben Lawson (brother)

Josh Lawson (born 22 July 1981) is an Australian actor. He is known for his role as Doug Guggenheim in House of Lies, Tate Staskiewicz in the first three seasons of the NBC sitcom Superstore and as Kano in the 2021 film Mortal Kombat and its 2026 sequel. Since 2024, he has been starring as Dr. Bruce Schweitz in St. Denis Medical.

== Early life ==
Born in 1981, Lawson grew up in Brisbane, and attended St Joseph's College, Gregory Terrace. He graduated from the National Institute of Dramatic Art in 2001. He also spent one year studying improvisation techniques in Los Angeles at The Second City, The Groundlings, ACME Comedy Theatre and I.O. West. His older brother is actor Ben Lawson.

In 2003, Lawson was awarded a Mike Walsh Fellowship.

== Career ==
=== Television ===
Lawson has had guest-starring roles in such popular Australian television programs as Blue Heelers and Home & Away, and is known for his appearances on the improv comedy program Thank God You're Here and on the Australian drama Sea Patrol and comedy The Librarians. He also had a guest role in the comedy Wilfred and starred in several television commercials, including advertisements for Coca-Cola Cherry and Gold Class cinemas.

He portrayed Tate Staskiewicz, the pharmacist in the series' titular setting, on the sitcom Superstore for three seasons.

Lawson also hosted Wipeout Australia with James Brayshaw.

Lawson played Ben in the American pilot Spaced and Shawn on Romantically Challenged for ABC. Since its inception in 2012, he has played management consultant Doug Guggenheim on Showtime's House of Lies.

In 2017, he played the title role in Hoges: The Paul Hogan Story.

Lawson currently stars on NBC's hit comedy, St. Denis Medical. The show was recently renewed for a third season.

=== Film ===
In 2006, Lawson made his feature film debut in BoyTown. He had the starring role in the 2012 Australian comedy film Any Questions for Ben?, created by Working Dog Productions. He also appeared alongside Will Ferrell and Zach Galifianakis in the 2012 comedy film The Campaign, as well as Anchorman 2: The Legend Continues and Crave.

His feature directing debut The Little Death which he also wrote and starred in, was released in 2014.

Lawson was nominated for an Academy Award for Best Live Action Short Film in 2018 for The Eleven O'Clock, a short film he wrote and starred in.

In 2018, Lawson portrayed "Dave Johnson" in the comedy pilot for the CBS series Here Comes the Neighborhood (later The Neighborhood), but was replaced by actor Max Greenfield before the series was picked up by the network.

In August 2019, Lawson was cast in the Mortal Kombat reboot as Kano.

=== Other work ===
During 2006 and 2007, Lawson was a regular guest co-host on the Australian radio comedy show Get This which aired on Triple M. In 2013, he voiced the role of Bob in the Cartoon Hangover short film Rocket Dog.

As of 2021, Lawson has authored two children's books, Shoo Grumpers Shoo! and The Internot.

== Personal Life ==
Lawson is engaged to former The Project talent manager Sharyn Hart.

== Filmography ==
=== Film ===
Year	Title	Role	Notes
2006	Hey Stranger	Caller	Short film
2006	Charmed Robbery	Customer	Short film
2006	BoyTown	Andy	
2007	$quid	Chris	Short film
2009	Law and Order: Really Special Victims Unit	The pianist	Short film; also writer
2010	The Wedding Party	Steve	
2010	After the Credits	Rude passenger	Short film; also director and writer
2011	Pet	Julian	Short film
2012	Any Questions for Ben?	Ben	
2012	The Campaign	Tripp Huggins	
2012	Crave	Aiden	
2012	Freeloaders	Dave	
2013	Free Birds	Gus / Settler (voice)	
2013	Anchorman 2: The Legend Continues	Kench Allenby	
2014	Growing Up and Other Lies	Jake	
2014	Border Protection Squad	Emma	
2014	The Little Death	Paul	Also director and writer; SXSW Audience Award for Narrative Spotlight; Thessaloniki International Film Festival Audience Award for Open Horizons; Nominated – Australian Writers' Guild Award for Feature Film – Original; Nominated – São Paulo International Film Festival Award for Best Feature Film
2016	The Eleven O'Clock	Terry Phillips	Short film; also producer and writer AACTA Award for Best Short Fiction Film; LA Shorts Fest Award for Best Short Film; Nominated – Academy Award for Best Live Action Short Film
2017	The Doppel Chain	Thomas	Short film
2017	Becoming Bond	George Lazenby	Documentary
2019	Bombshell	James Murdoch	
2020	Holly Slept Over	Noel	
2021	Long Story Short	Patrick	Also director and writer
2021	Mortal Kombat	Kano	
2023	True Spirit	Roger Watson	
2024	Woody Woodpecker Goes to Camp	Zane	
2026	Mortal Kombat II	Kano	
2026	Cop This	AJ	

=== Television ===
Year	Title	Role	Notes
1997	The Wayne Manifesto	Trevor	2 episodes
1998	Medivac	Rob	Episode: "Denial"
1998	The Day of the Roses	Mark Shuttler	Miniseries; 2 episodes
2002	TwentyfourSeven	Tony White	13 episodes
2004	Home and Away	Felix Walters	3 episodes
2006	Blue Heelers	David Murray	5 episodes
2006	All Saints	Nick Bagnall	Episode: "Tough Love"
2006	Nightmares & Dreamscapes: From the Stories of Stephen King	ER Doctor	Episode: "Autopsy Room Four"
2006–2009	Thank God You're Here	Himself	9 episodes
2007	Sea Patrol	Toby "Chefo" Jones	13 episodes
2007	The Librarians	Lachie Davis	6 episodes
2007–2009	Chandon Pictures	Carmichael Chandon	11 episodes
2009	Wipeout Australia	Himself (Presenter)	8 episodes
2010	Wilfred	Spencer	Episode: "The Dog Father"
2010	Hawke	Grant Nihill	Television film
2010	Romantically Challenged	Shawn Goldwater	6 episodes
2011	Underbelly Files: The Man Who Got Away	Michael Sullivan	Television film
2012	Lowdown	Mark Hardy	Episode: "A Bollywood Ending"
2012–2016	House of Lies	Doug Guggenheim	58 episodes
2014	Kinne	Guest Cast	6 episodes
2015–2018	Superstore	Tate Staskiewicz	Recurring role
2016	Wrecked	Eric	Episode: "The Adventures of Beth and Lamar"
2017	Hoges: The Paul Hogan Story	Paul Hogan	Miniseries; 2 episodes
2018	Welcome to the Neighborhood	Dave	Unaired pilot (replaced by Max Greenfield)
2021	Have You Been Paying Attention?	Himself	1 episode
2022	Cobra Kai	Owen	1 episode
2023	Would I Lie To You? Australia	Himself	1 episode
2024–present	St. Denis Medical	Dr. Bruce	Main role

=== Web ===
Year	Title	Role	Notes
2013	Rocket Dog	Bob (voice)	Short film
