= Foreshadow (film) =

- Film poster
- Directed by: Carmelo Musca
- Written by: Justin Burford; Kris Lippert
- Produced by: Robert Le Tet
- Starring: Justin Burford; Myles Pollard; Andrea Burdett (as Andrea Addison)
- Cinematography: Ulrich-Stephan Krafzik
- Edited by: Peter Pritchard; Regg Skwarko
- Music by: Tim Count
- Release date: 20 October 2013
- Running time: 86 minutes
- Country: Australia
- Language: English

Foreshadow is a 2013 Australian supernatural mystery thriller film directed by Carmelo Musca and starring co-writer Justin Burford, Myles Pollard and Andrea Addison.

== Plot synopsis ==
Jesse Milton is living the good life, surfing the big waves and meeting hot girls, until the mysterious death of a friend turns his everyday life upside down. With the cops unable to investigate the killing, Milton enlists the help of his friends to help identify a serial killer and finds himself battling demonic forces.

== Cast ==
- Justin Burford as Jesse Milton
- Myles Pollard as Detective Michael Monaghan
- Andrea Addison as Joanne Peterson
- Ben Purser as Billy Jones
- Ben Mortley as Luke Matthews
- James Hagan as Father Bernard
- Melanie Lyons as Tessa Mailáth
- Ben Young as Ted
