= Halloween 3: AwesomeLand =

- Modern Family episode
- Episode no.: Season 6 Episode 6
- Directed by: Gail Mancuso
- Written by: Paul Corrigan; Brad Walsh; Abraham Higginbotham
- Production code: 6ATM06
- Original air date: October 29, 2014

Guest appearances
- Steve Zahn as Ronnie; Andrea Anders as Amber; Tucker Smallwood as Judge; Jerry Lambert as Lawyer; Tom Parker as Doctor

Episode chronology
| ← Previous "Won't You Be Our Neighbor" | Next → "Queer Eyes, Full Hearts" |
- Modern Family season 6

"Halloween 3: AwesomeLand" is the sixth episode of the sixth season of the American sitcom Modern Family, and the series' 126th episode overall. It originally aired on October 29, 2014. The episode was written by Paul Corrigan, Brad Walsh & Abraham Higginbotham and directed by Gail Mancuso.

The episode focuses on the characters of the show preparing for Halloween, with Jay (Ed O'Neill) and Gloria (Sofía Vergara) struggling with their costumes and Claire (Julie Bowen) and Phil (Ty Burrell) competing with their new neighbors to have the scariest house on the block. Meanwhile, Mitchell (Jesse Tyler Ferguson) tries to win a trial and Cameron (Eric Stonestreet) struggles to balance work and Lily's (Aubrey Anderson-Emmons) Halloween activities. The episode received positive reviews and was watched by 9.92 million viewers. It was dedicated to Elizabeth Peña, who portrayed Gloria's mother on the show, who died two weeks before the airing of the episode on October 14, 2014.

== Plot ==
Jay (Ed O'Neill) is tired of always being the "ugly guy" on Halloween and Gloria (Sofía Vergara) the princess but Gloria tells him that this is happening because he never wants to go with them to buy their outfits. Jay says that this time he will go and buy everyone a costume and he buys a costume of Prince Charming for himself, along with a blond wig. He loves the wig because it makes him remember his youth when he still had hair but he ends up going to the party without it since Stella buried and destroyed it.

At the Dunphys, Claire (Julie Bowen) has to work this year so Phil (Ty Burrell) is responsible for the Halloween decorations of the house. He starts decorating but nothing is scary, like Claire likes to be on Halloween, but she accepts it since she cannot stay to change it. An encounter with her new neighbor Ronnie (Steve Zahn) though, makes her change her mind and she skips work to stay and make their home the scariest of the neighborhood so they can win the contest of the scariest house. When Ronnie sees Claire's decorations, his wife Amber (Andrea Anders) pretends that she is traumatized by them, making Claire and the whole family go back to Phil's non-scary decorations. At the end of the day, Amber and Ronnie admit that they lied so they could win the contest and Claire promises them that they will pay for this.

Meanwhile, Mitchell (Jesse Tyler Ferguson) tries to get ready for a trial that he wants to win because he already lost three times in a row, while Cameron (Eric Stonestreet) tries to balance his time for work and for Lily (Aubrey Anderson-Emmons). Cameron is dressed up as Superman, Lily as Waldo and they leave for Lily's school while Mitchell leaves for the court. Mitchell ends up losing the trial again while Cameron finds out at school that the costume of the parents should be fitting with their kids as the flyer was saying. He goes back home to change his costume and returns to school to find out that the parade is after the classes, something that was also on the flyer. Cameron cannot stay because he has to go to work and Lily is upset. Back at home, Mitchell proves that Lily never gave the flyer to them and that is why Cameron did not know about the parade and the costumes. Cameron and Lily apologize to each other while Mitchell gets his win.

== Reception ==
=== Ratings ===
In its original American broadcast, "Halloween 3: AwesomeLand" was watched by 9.92; down by 0.24 from the previous episode.

=== Reviews ===
"Halloween 3: AwesomeLand" received positive reviews.

Evan Slead from Emertainment Monthly gave the episode an A rating saying: "The writers are continually building the humor around the characters, instead of the other way around. Many shows fall into the trap of turning their characters into stereotypes at some point, but Modern Family maintains its strength by giving the characters an ever changing persona."

Joshua Alston of The A.V. Club gave the episode a B+ rating saying that the episode "was sharp [...] with a surplus of winning lines and some subtly elegant plot building. It’s easily funnier than the rest of the season, with the exception of "Neighbor.""

Leigh Raines from TV Fanatic rated the episode with 4/5. "Phil has more joy and lightness of heart than a young innocent child. If Disneyland is considered the Happiest Place on Earth, then there is a good chance Phil was born there."

== Notes ==
The episode was dedicated to the actress Elizabeth Peña who portrayed Gloria's mother, Pilar, in the series, who died on October 14, 2014.
