= Won't You Be Our Neighbor =

- Modern Family episode
- Episode no.: Season 6 Episode 5
- Directed by: Gail Mancuso
- Written by: Paul Corrigan; Brad Walsh
- Production code: 6ATM04
- Original air date: October 22, 2014

Guest appearances
- Steve Zahn as Ronnie; Andrea Anders as Amber; Tyne Daly as Mrs. Plank; Jon Polito as Earl Chambers; Matt Besser as Jerry; Fiona Gubelmann as Lisa; Ben Lawson as George

Episode chronology
← Previous "Marco Polo"	Next → "Halloween 3: AwesomeLand"
- Modern Family season 6

"Won't You Be Our Neighbor" is the fifth episode of the sixth season of the American sitcom Modern Family, and the series' 125th episode overall. It originally aired on October 22, 2014. The episode was written by Paul Corrigan & Brad Walsh and directed by Gail Mancuso. The episode's title is a play on the Mr. Rogers Neighborhood theme song, "Won't You Be My Neighbor?".

In the episode, Phil and Claire are getting new neighbors, Jay finds out that Manny's new girlfriend is also the granddaughter of his longtime rival, while Cameron and Mitchell try to move Lily to another class with a teacher they think is more fun.

"Won't You Be Our Neighbor" received positive reviews from the critics.

== Plot ==
Jay (Ed O'Neill) makes a new invention for socks and plans to sell it but everything seems to fall apart for him when Manny's (Rico Rodriguez) new girlfriend, Sophie (Cheyn Cole), comes home and sees it. As it is revealed, Sophie is the granddaughter of Jay's longtime enemy and owner of the "Closets, Closets, Closets, Closets" company, Earl (Jon Polito). Jay is convinced that she will tell her grandfather about his invention and Earl will steal his idea. Jay demands from Manny to stop seeing Sophie but Gloria (Sofía Vergara) is determined to make the two men make up and she arranges a dinner for them to talk and resolve their differences.

Meanwhile, the Dunphy's neighbor, Jerry (Matt Besser), moves out after his divorce and asks Phil (Ty Burrell) to sell his house. Claire (Julie Bowen) is happy with the idea that they can choose their new neighbors and they do everything to impress a new couple, George (Ben Lawson) and Lisa (Fiona Gubelmann). The couple is ready to buy it when another couple, Ronnie (Steve Zahn) and Amber (Andrea Anders), come and make a better offer. Claire does not like them at all, however her and Phil's attempts to make George and Lisa increase their offer too comes across wrong and it seems like they're trying to seduce the pair, leading to them withdrawing their offer altogether. Claire begs Phil to not tell Jerry about the better offer, however Phil reminds her he is legally bound to. When he goes to see Jerry he presents the offer but also tells them the family seems like a nightmare to live next door to. Jerry understands and offers to keep the house on the market, but when Phil realises what a miserable life Jerry is now leading he advises him to accept. Ronnie and Amber buy the house and they move in, while the Dunphy family watches.

Cameron (Eric Stonestreet) and Mitchell (Jesse Tyler Ferguson) find out that there is an opening in Ms. Sparrow's class and they want for Lily (Aubrey Anderson-Emmons) to take it, since they believe that Lily is stressed out by her teacher, Mrs. Plank (Tyne Daly). Ms. Sparrow's class is more fun and kids are happy there. Without asking Lily, they meet Mrs. Plank and they manage to move Lily to Ms. Sparrow's class, but they soon find out that Lily does not want to change teachers because she actually learns new and important things there. Cameron and Mitchell are forced to go back to Mrs. Plank and beg her to take Lily back.

== Reception ==
=== Ratings ===
In its original American broadcast, "Won't You Be Our Neighbor" was watched by 10.16; up by 0.45 from the previous episode.

=== Reviews ===
"Won't You Be Our Neighbor" received positive reviews.

Joshua Alston from The A.V. Club gave the episode an A− rating saying that the episode was solid despite the families being in separated stories. "[Won't You Be Our Neighbor]continues the streak of energized episodes written by the elite team that is to Modern Family as the retention team is to the average cable provider. They’re the consummate pros who convince you to stay even when you’re so tempted to bail."

Leigh Raines of TV Fanatic rated the episode with 4/5.

Fourthmic gave a good review to the episode saying that it was generally quite funny. "It isn’t often that the series keeps each family in their own silo as was the case on “Won’t You Be Our Neighbor”, but it was a fun change. The result was basically three short stories that featured the characters managing a relationship with an outsider. The three scenarios were different and each featured flubs and successes."
