= Marco Polo (Modern Family) =

- Modern Family episode
- Episode no.: Season 6 Episode 4
- Directed by: Fred Savage
- Written by: Elaine Ko
- Production code: 6ATM05
- Original air date: October 15, 2014

Guest appearances
- Sam Lloyd as Lester; Rory Scovel as Carl

Episode chronology
← Previous "The Cold"	Next → "Won't You Be Our Neighbor"
- Modern Family season 6

"Marco Polo" is the fourth episode of the sixth season of the American sitcom Modern Family, and the series' 124th episode overall. It originally aired on October 15, 2014. The episode was written by Elaine Ko and directed by Fred Savage.

In the episode, the Dunphy family is forced to move into a single hotel room while their house is treated for mold, leading to tension when Phil discovers Claire has a secret room. Meanwhile, Cameron struggles with football superstitions that involve Mitchell, and Jay and Gloria discover that Manny's new friend is actually a senior-year girlfriend. The episode received mixed reviews from critics and was watched by 9.71 million viewers upon its initial broadcast.

== Plot ==
The Dunphys have to leave their house for few days while it is being treated for mold. Phil (Ty Burrell) closes the last room of a nearby hotel with only one single full-sized bed. Claire (Julie Bowen) figures that they can survive one night, but five nights later things don't seem so great. While there, Phil discovers that Claire has found a room for herself and has been sleeping there on her own. Phil feels betrayed, but Haley (Sarah Hyland) wonders why some of them can not stay with Claire so everyone will be more comfortable. The kids agree that Claire's room is actually livable and they all move to her room, leaving Phil alone. Phil, upset by the family's behavior, attempts to teach the neighboring family how to play Marco Polo, but is unsuccessful. Haley and Alex (Ariel Winter) find out that the hotel was half-full the whole week and they realize that Phil lied to them so they could all spend time together. The family relents and heads down to the pool to play Marco Polo with him in the middle of the night, which makes Phil very happy, but Claire dislikes how Phil unintentionally invited the Nigerian family to sleep at their house.

Cameron's (Eric Stonestreet) football team is up to 5-0. It is unprecedented at the school, so Cameron picks up several superstitions before every game. Mitchell (Jesse Tyler Ferguson) gets a bit tired of it and tries to stop Cameron of following those superstitions but with no luck. When Cameron leaves, Mitchell realizes that it does not matter if he does not like football and he has to be supportive of Cameron, so he leaves to go to the game. At the football game, the team plays well and is winning, but the moment Mitchell arrives, the luck of the team suddenly changes, something that makes Cameron think that Mitchell is a jinx. He tells Mitchell causing him to leave. When the team wins, Cameron is upset with himself when he realizes that Mitchell has gone and he calls to apologize for what he said. Mitchell informs him he is stuck on a stadium fence after attempting a shortcut to his car. Cameron helps him get down off the fence and they both apologize to each other for their behavior.

Jay (Ed O'Neill) and Gloria (Sofía Vergara) are worried about Manny (Rico Rodriguez) hanging out with Sam (Madison Iseman), a new friend who is a senior while Manny is still a sophomore. They later realize that Manny's friend is actually a girl, and she is also his girlfriend, which makes Gloria worry even more. Jay reassures Gloria, suggesting that Sam's support at the football game indicates she cares for Manny. Later on, Jay sees Sam making out with another boy, but he does not want to tell Manny for fear of hurting him. But Manny returns home heartbroken as Sam broke up with him. He informs Jay that Sam was using him to make her ex-boyfriend jealous. Jay talks to him and points out that of all the boys, Sam chose him to make her ex jealous and that should make him feel important because it means he is at the same level as the other guy.

== Reception ==
=== Ratings ===
In its original American broadcast, "Marco Polo" was watched by 9.71; down by 0.59 from the previous episode.

=== Reviews ===
"Marco Polo" received mixed reviews.

Leigh Raines of TV Fanatic rated the episode with 4/5. "On "Marco Polo", things got very "National Lampoon's" when the Dunphys were forced to stay at a motel in one room, while their house was cleared of mold."

Joshua Alston from The A.V. Club gave the episode a grade of B− saying: ""Marco Polo" features a few light twists, making it one of the season's fleeter installments, and yet somehow there's still a pervasive feeling of been-here-done-that weighing it down despite its charms."
