= List of The Big Bang Theory franchise characters =

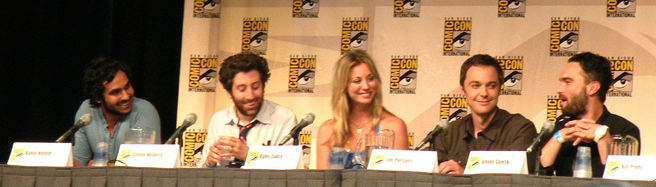
The Big Bang Theory cast at Comic-Con 2009, from left: Kunal Nayyar, Simon Helberg, Kaley Cuoco, Jim Parsons, and Johnny Galecki

The American television sitcom franchise The Big Bang Theory, began with the multi-cam sitcom of the same name created and executive produced by Chuck Lorre and Bill Prady, which premiered on CBS on September 24, 2007, and ended on May 16, 2019, followed by the single-camera spinoff prequel television series Young Sheldon, created and executive produced by Lorre alongside Jim Parsons and Steven Molaro, which premiered on CBS on September 25, 2017, and concluded on May 16, 2024, with the third series in the franchise, a multi-cam spin-off sequel to Young Sheldon entitled Georgie & Mandy's First Marriage, premiering on October 17, 2024, and a fourth series, an alternate universe multi-cam spin-off of The Big Bang Theory, entitled Stuart Fails to Save the Universe, premiering on July 23, 2026.

The Big Bang Theory initially centers on five characters: Sheldon Lee Cooper and Leonard Hofstadter, two physicists and roommates; Penny, their neighbor who is a waiter and aspiring actor; and aerospace engineer Howard Joel Wolowitz and astrophysicist Raj Koothrappali, Sheldon and Leonard's friends and coworkers.

Over time, several supporting characters were introduced and promoted to starring roles, including physicist Leslie Winkle, microbiologist Bernadette Maryann Rostenkowski-Wolowitz, neuroscientist Amy Farrah Fowler, comic book store proprietor and friend of the other characters Stuart Bloom, and dermatology resident whom Raj finds on an online dating site, Emily Sweeney.

The series also features numerous supporting characters, each of whom plays a prominent role in a story arc. Included among them are parents of the main characters, their dates, and their coworkers. Celebrities such as Stephen Hawking appear in cameo roles as themselves.

Young Sheldon initially centers on Sheldon Cooper at the age of nine, going to high school and living with his family in the fictional town of Medford, East Texas; Sheldon's mother, Mary; his father and the head football coach at Medford High, George Sr.; his twin sister, Missy; his older brother, George "Georgie" Jr.; and his grandmother, Constance "Connie" Tucker, also known as "Meemaw". The series also features numerous supporting characters, each of whom plays a prominent role in a story arc. Included among them are Sheldon's present and former classmates, their dates and coworkers, and those of his family. Jim Parsons, who portrays the adult Sheldon Cooper on The Big Bang Theory, narrates the series and serves as an executive producer.

Georgie & Mandy's First Marriage, taking place after the events of Young Sheldon, follows Georgie Cooper, Sheldon's older brother; Amanda "Mandy" McAllister, Georgie's wife and the mother of their daughter Constance / "CeeCee"; Audrey McAllister (née Hicks), Mandy's mother; Jim McAllister, Mandy's father; Connor McAllister, Mandy's younger brother; and Ruben Alvarez, Georgie's co-worker and later the co-owner of Jim's purchased auto business alongside Georgie. Montana Jordan, Emily Osment, Rachel Bay Jones, and Will Sasso reprise their respective roles from Young Sheldon; while the character of Connor McAllister, played by Joseph Apollonio in Young Sheldon, is recast with Dougie Baldwin; and the entirely new role of Ruben Alvarez is played by Jessie Prez.

Stuart Fails to Save the Universe centers on alternate versions of Stuart Bloom, Denise, Bert Kibbler, and Barry Kripke, with Kevin Sussman, Lauren Lapkus, Brian Posehn and John Ross Bowie reprising their roles from The Big Bang Theory, and various other characters from the original series appearing in recurring and guest roles in addition to new characters. The four main characters travel between different universes attempting to avert the apocalypse and restore their original version of reality, in the wake of a catastrophic cosmic anomaly caused by a machine that Sheldon, Leonard and Howard created off-screen prior to the beginning of the series.

== Main characters ==
=== Cast table ===
List indicators

This section includes characters who have appeared in The Big Bang Theory, Young Sheldon, Georgie & Mandy's First Marriage, or Stuart Fails to Save the Universe in a main role.

- An empty grey cell indicates the character was not in the season.
- ^{V} indicates a voice-only role.

= Main cast (credited)
= Recurring cast (2+ episodes)
= Guest cast (1 episode)

Character	Portrayed by	The Big Bang Theory												Young Sheldon							Georgie & Mandy's First Marriage			Stuart Fails to Save the Universe
Character	Portrayed by	1	2	3	4	5	6	7	8	9	10	11	12	1	2	3	4	5	6	7	1	2	3	1
Leonard Hofstadter	Johnny Galecki (Note: The Young Sheldon season 2 finale features a montage in which several characters from The Big Bang Theory are shown as children. None of the children had a speaking role. Leonard is portrayed by Isaac Harger; Penny by Quinn Aune; Howard by Ethan Reed Stern; Raj by Rishabh Prabhat; Bernadette by A. J. Coggeshall; and Amy by Lily Sanfelippo.)	Main	Main	Main	Main	Main	Main	Main	Main	Main	Main	Main	Main		G									
Sheldon Cooper	Jim Parsons	Main	Main	Main	Main	Main	Main	Main	Main	Main	Main	Main	Main	Voice only (Note: Except in the series finale, where he makes a physical appearance as adult Sheldon.)	Voice only	Voice only	Voice only	Voice only	Voice only	Voice only				
Sheldon Cooper	Iain Armitage												G	Lead	Lead	Lead	Lead	Lead	Lead	Lead			TBA	
Penny Hofstadter	Kaley Cuoco	Main	Main	Main	Main	Main	Main	Main	Main	Main	Main	Main	Main		Guest									R
Howard Wolowitz	Simon Helberg	Main	Main	Main	Main	Main	Main	Main	Main	Main	Main	Main	Main		G			G^{V}						
Rajesh "Raj" Koothrappali	Kunal Nayyar	Main	Main	Main	Main	Main	Main	Main	Main	Main	Main	Main	Main		G									R
Leslie Winkle	Sara Gilbert	R	M	G						G														
Bernadette Rostenkowski-Wolowitz	Melissa Rauch			R	Main	Main	Main	Main	Main	Main	Main	Main	Main		G									R
Amy Farrah Fowler	Mayim Bialik			G	Main (Note: In the fourth season, Bialik is initially credited as a guest star before being promoted to the main cast in the eighth episode.)	Main	Main	Main	Main	Main	Main	Main	Main		G		G^{V}	G^{V}		G				R
Stuart Bloom	Kevin Sussman		Recurring	Recurring	Recurring	Recurring	M (Note: In the sixth season, Sussman is initially credited as a series regular before being demoted to a guest star in the sixteenth episode onwards.)	R	Main	Main	Main	Main	Main											Lead
Emily Sweeney	Laura Spencer							R	R	M	G													
Mary Cooper	Laurie Metcalf	G		Guest	Guest	Guest		R	G	Recurring	Recurring	Recurring												
Mary Cooper	Zoe Perry													Main	Main	Main	Main	Main	Main	Main	R	R	R	
George Cooper Sr.	Lance Barber (Note: Barber also makes an appearance in the fifth season of The Big Bang Theory as a different character, Jimmy Speckerman, Leonard's former high school colleague who used to bully him.)					G							G	Main	Main	Main	Main	Main	Main	Main	G			
George "Georgie" Cooper Jr.	Jerry O'Connell											R	G											
George "Georgie" Cooper Jr.	Montana Jordan												G	Main	Main	Main	Main	Main	Main	Main	Lead	Lead	Lead	
Melissa "Missy" Cooper	Courtney Henggeler	G						G^{V}				G												
Melissa "Missy" Cooper	Raegan Revord													Main	Main	Main	Main	Main	Main	Main	R	R	R	
Constance "Connie" Tucker ("Meemaw")	June Squibb									G														
Constance "Connie" Tucker ("Meemaw")	Annie Potts													Main	Main	Main	Main	Main	Main	Main	R	R	R	
Pastor Jeff Difford	Matt Hobby													R	R	Main	Main	Main	Main	Main	R	R	R	
William “Billy” Sparks	Wyatt McClure													Recurring	Recurring	Recurring	Recurring	Main	Main	Main				
Amanda "Mandy" McAllister	Emily Osment																	R	Main	Main	Lead	Lead	Lead	
Jim McAllister	Will Sasso																		R	R	Main	Main	Main	
Audrey McAllister	Rachel Bay Jones																		R	R	Main	Main	Main	
Connor McAllister	Joseph Apollonio																		G					
Connor McAllister	Dougie Baldwin																				Main	Main	Main	
Ruben Alvarez	Jessie Prez																				Main	Main	Main	
Denise	Lauren Lapkus											R	R											Main
Bert Kibbler	Brian Posehn						G	G			Recurring	Recurring	Recurring											Main
Barry Kripke	John Ross Bowie		R	R	G	Recurring	Recurring	Recurring	Recurring	Recurring	G	R	R											Main

=== The Big Bang Theory main characters ===
==== Leonard Hofstadter ====
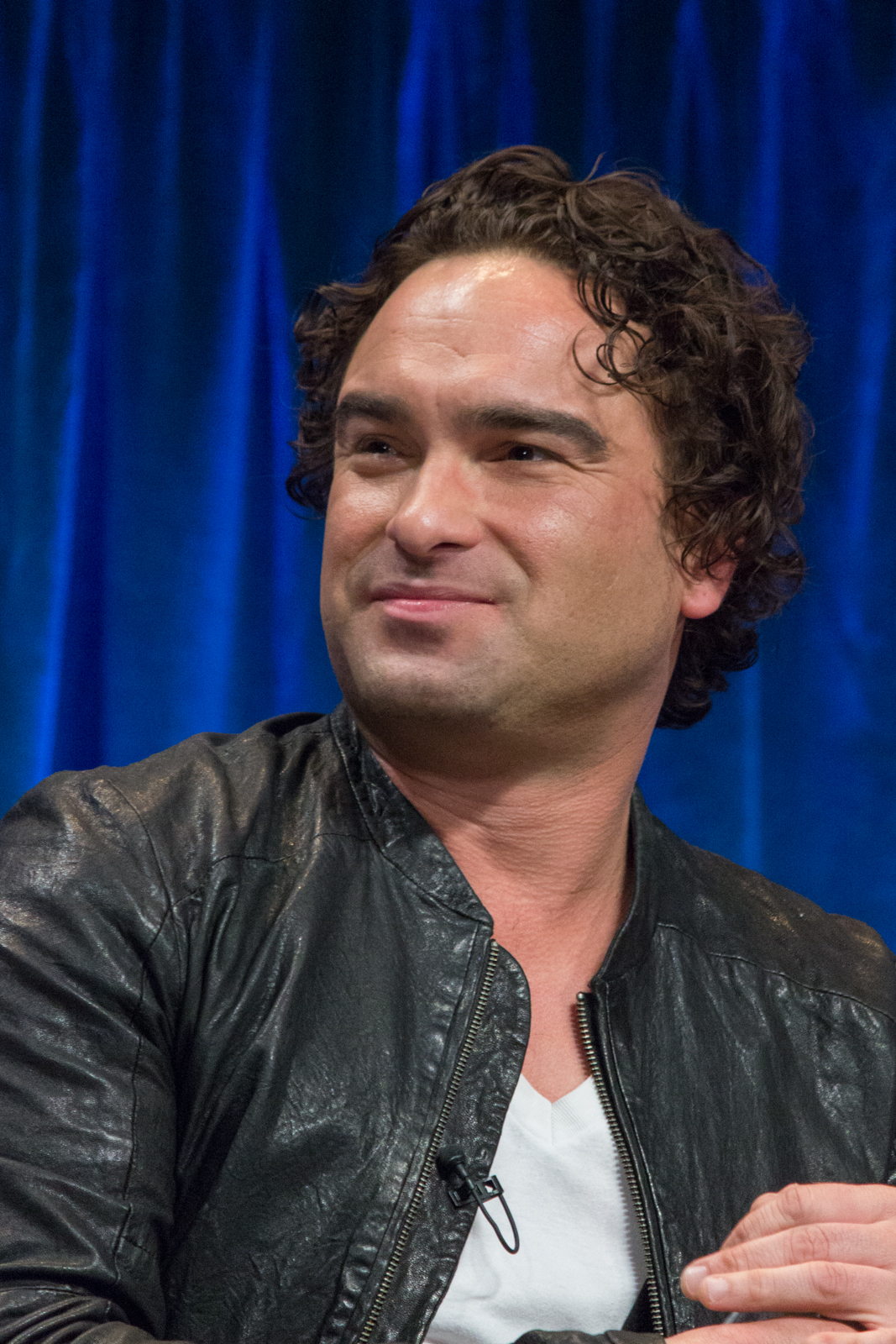
Johnny Galecki

Leonard Leakey Hofstadter (portrayed by Johnny Galecki; seasons 1–12) is an experimental physicist with an IQ of 173. Originally from New Jersey, he received his PhD at age 24, spending at least some of his time at Princeton University. He shared an apartment in Pasadena with colleague and friend Dr. Sheldon Cooper for much of the series. Unlike his equally geeky friends, Leonard is interested and adept in building relationships with other people. Compared to his friends, he is relatively successful with women. Leonard comes from an accomplished family. His mother, Dr. Beverly Hofstadter, is a neuroscientist and world-renowned psychiatrist with whom he has a strained relationship. His sister is a medical researcher, his father, Dr. Alfred Hofstadter, is an anthropologist, and his brother Michael is a Harvard law professor. He and Penny date on and off throughout the series, eventually marrying and finding out that Penny is pregnant in the series finale.

Leonard makes a brief non-speaking cameo as a child in the Season 2 finale of Young Sheldon; he was portrayed by Isaac Harger as a child.

==== Sheldon Cooper ====
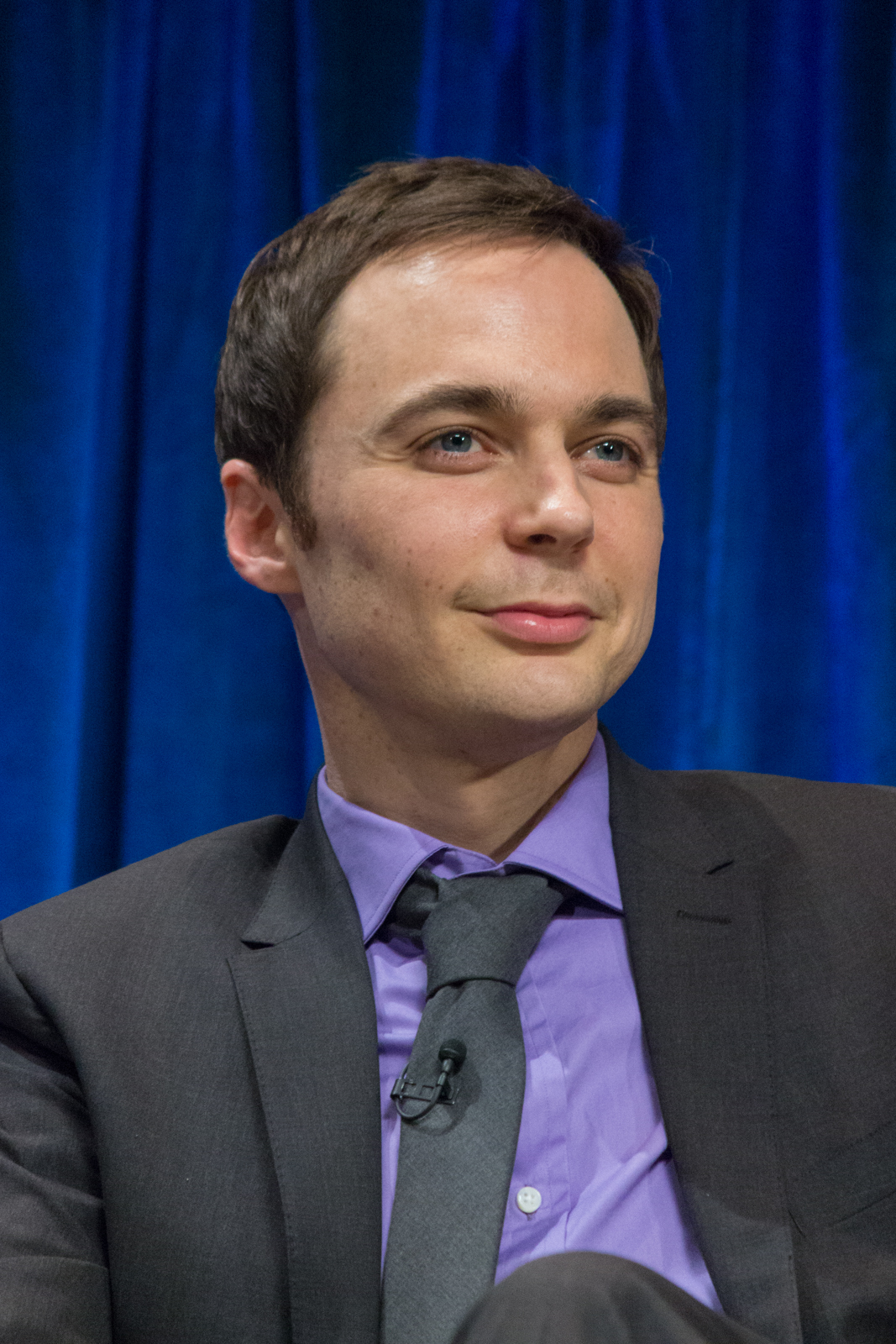
Jim Parsons

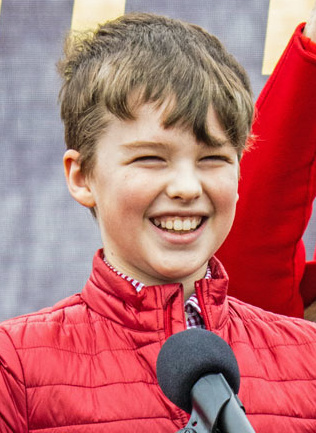
Iain Armitage

Sheldon Lee Cooper (portrayed by Jim Parsons; The Big Bang Theory seasons 1–12, Young Sheldon season 7; voiced by Parsons; narrator: Young Sheldon; and by Iain Armitage; guest: The Big Bang Theory season 12; main: Young Sheldon) is a theoretical physicist, possessing a B.S, M.S, M.A, Ph.D, Sc.D, I.Q. of 187, and eidetic memory. Born in East Texas, he was a child prodigy and received his PhD at age 16 from the California Institute of Technology. He is a cold, condescending, self-centered, and immature person but is rarely malicious. He is obsessed with routines and any disruptions distress him enormously. He shows signs of obsessive–compulsive personality disorder, often shown through his compulsive need to knock three times on a door while saying the name of the person behind the door three times too and the superiority complex. Despite his narcissism, selfishness, and lack of social graces, he does care about his friends and family. In seasons 1–9, he shares an apartment in Pasadena with friend and fellow physicist Dr. Leonard Hofstadter. From then after, he moves in with his girlfriend and eventual wife, Amy. It is revealed in Young Sheldon that they have kids too.

His interest in science fiction and comic books borders on the extreme. He has a particular affinity for Spock from the Star Trek franchise. Although he has the tendency to take things literally, he is fond of occasionally telling a joke or playing a prank, which he typically punctuates with his trademark exclamation, "Bazinga!"

As portrayed in Young Sheldon, he is a child prodigy who finishes primary school before his twin sister, Missy, and joins the same high-school class as his older brother, Georgie, at the age of nine. He reads widely and possesses an eidetic memory. He prefers to learn topics that interest him on his own—such as Faraday's law of induction and gravitational lensing—than the standard curriculum of grade school. In this series, the origins of his interests in the sciences, engineering, computers, trains, comic books, and science fiction (especially the character Spock from Star Trek) are revealed. Sheldon moves on to college while Missy remains in middle school. Despite their rivalry, Sheldon and Missy are closer than they first appear.

Iain Armitage, who plays young Sheldon on the spin-off, briefly appears in a video tape being watched by Parsons during a final season episode of The Big Bang Theory; it is the only time Parsons and Armitage have appeared together so far.

==== Penny ====
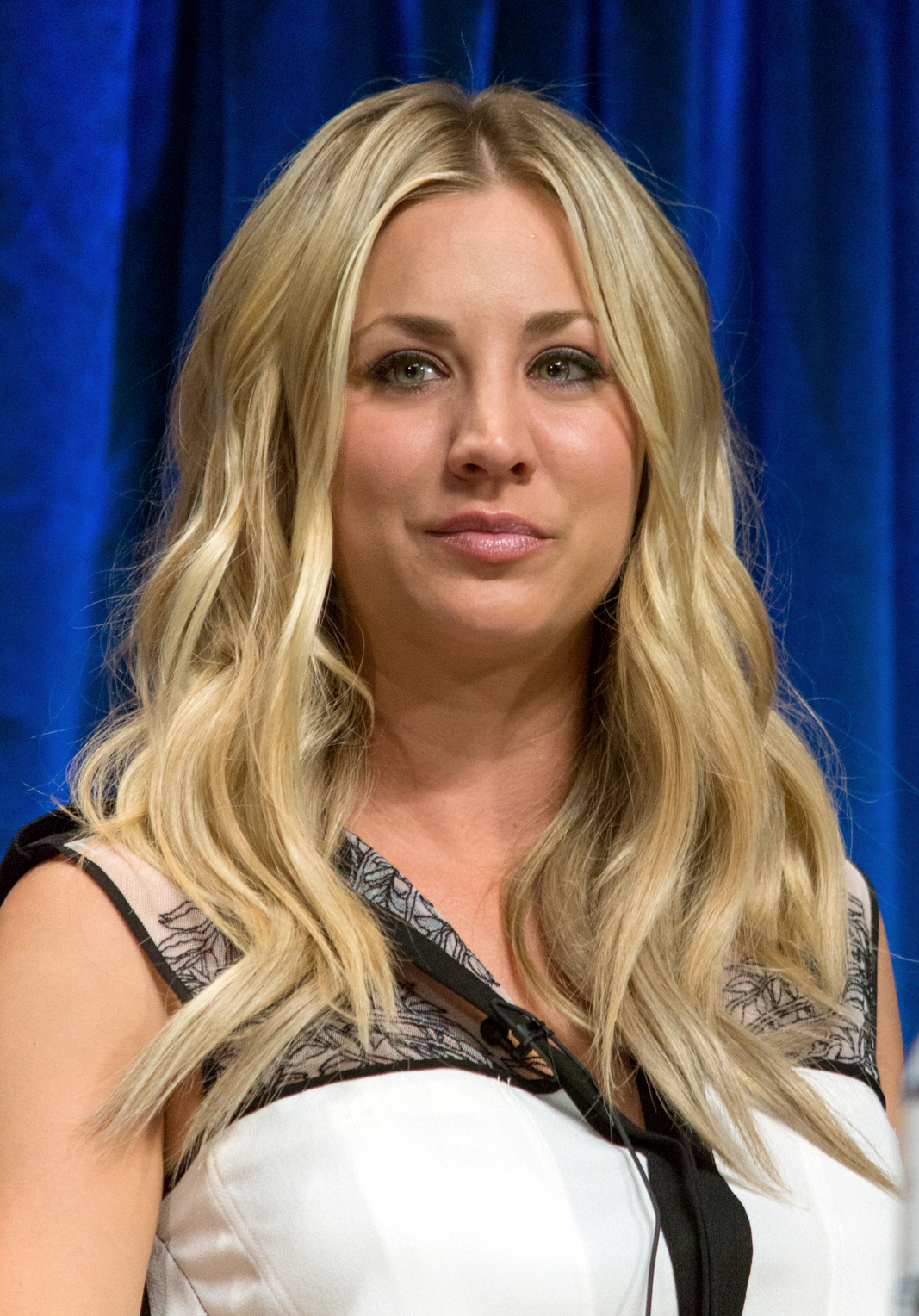
Kaley Cuoco

Kindhearted and outgoing, Penny (portrayed by Kaley Cuoco, main: The Big Bang Theory seasons 1–12; recurring: Stuart Fails to Save the Universe season 1) is Leonard and Sheldon's neighbor across the hallway from the inception of the series, replacing the apartment's former occupant, Louis/Louise, a "transvestite with a skin condition" according to Sheldon. Originally from a small town outside Omaha, Nebraska, she was a waitress and occasional bartender at the local Cheesecake Factory until season seven, and is an aspiring actress. Sheldon describes her as a "good-natured simpleton" and is critical of her dropping out of community college.

Initially, not much is known about Penny's family, but it is mentioned in the series that her father, Wyatt (portrayed by Keith Carradine,) raised her like a boy, her mother Susan smoked marijuana while she was pregnant with her, her sister shot her husband while they were intoxicated, and her brother Randall is a meth dealer. Susan (Katey Sagal) and Randall (Jack McBrayer) are finally seen in the first episode of season ten. Her last name is never revealed during the series; though it is hinted at in an episode of season two, she ultimately adopts the last name Hofstadter after marrying Leonard. Leonard and Penny date on and off throughout the series which is a big plot point of the show, they eventually marry and find out she's pregnant in the series finale.

Penny makes a brief non-speaking cameo as a child in the Season 2 finale of Young Sheldon, she was portrayed by Quinn Aune as a child. Cuoco additionally voices the pool water, part of one of young Sheldon's nightmares, in the spinoff.

==== Howard Wolowitz ====
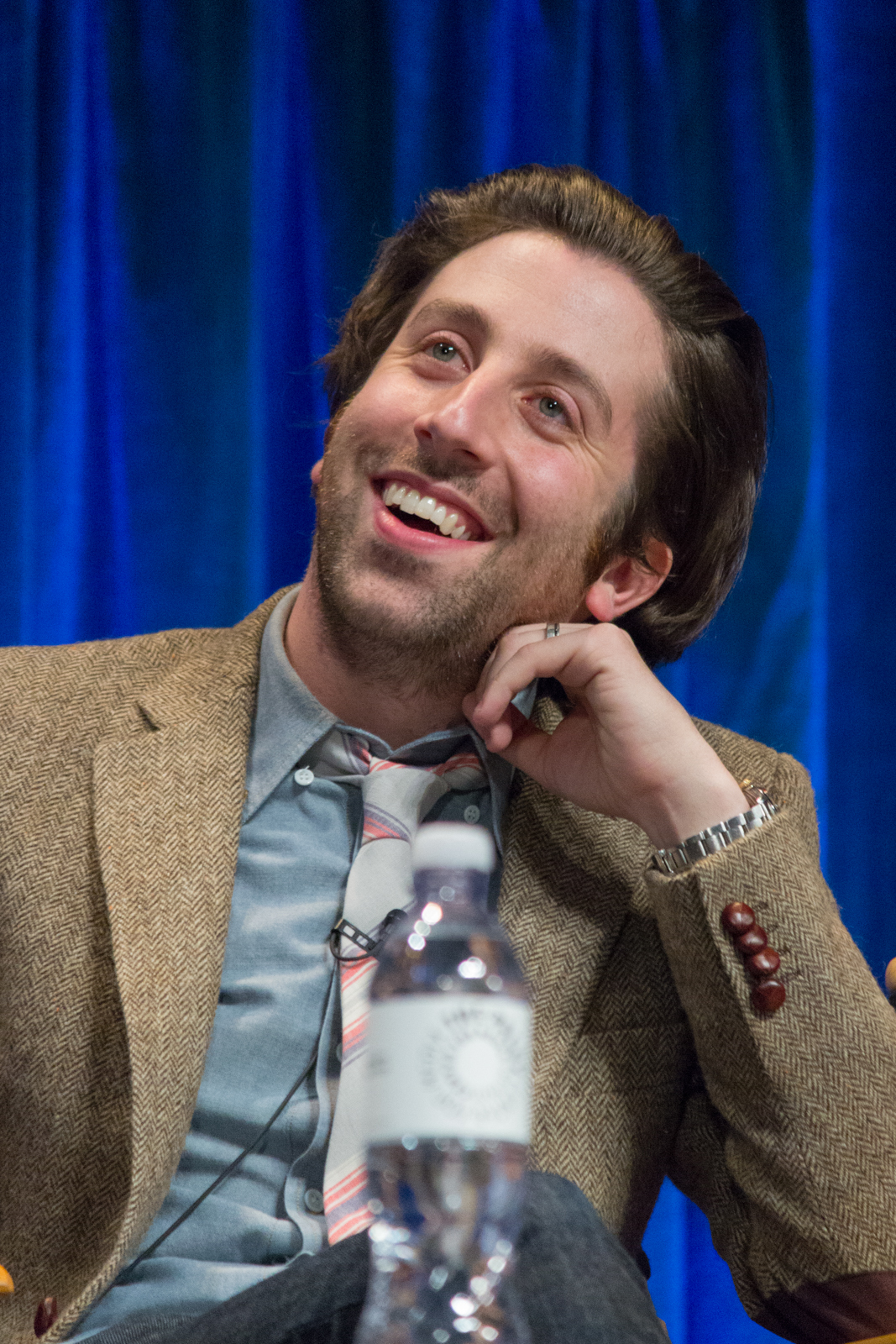
Simon Helberg

Howard Joel Wolowitz, M.Eng. (portrayed by Simon Helberg; main: the Big Bang Theory seasons 1–12; guest: Young Sheldon season 5) is an aerospace engineer at Caltech's Department of Applied Physics who often hangs out at Leonard and Sheldon's apartment. Unlike Sheldon, Leonard, and Raj, Howard does not have a doctorate and often gets disparaged as a result, especially by Sheldon. He defends this by pointing out that he has a master's degree in engineering from MIT and that the equipment he designs is launched into space, unlike the theoretical work of his friends. In the fifth-season finale, Howard goes to the International Space Station on Expedition 31.

Howard lives in Altadena with his domineering, belittling, and unseen mother, who treats him like a child. While he sometimes expresses irritation at this treatment, for the most part, he appears to prefer it. Howard and his mother often communicate with each other from different rooms by yelling, a habit which Bernadette also adopts in later episodes. Howard fancies himself a ladies' man and attempts pick-up lines whenever a woman is present, although he drops this habit once he starts going out with Bernadette. He is a non-observant Jew. Over the course of the series, he and Bernadette marry and have two children.

In the pilot episode, he speaks English, French, Mandarin, Russian, Arabic, and Persian, along with constructed languages like Klingon and Sindarin. Howard has asthma, transient idiopathic arrhythmia, allergies to peanuts, almonds, and walnuts, and is prone to canker sores and pink eye.

Howard makes a brief non-speaking appearance in the Season 2 finale of Young Sheldon, in which he was portrayed by Ethan Stern as a child; he returns to reprise himself in a narration with Helberg's voiceover for a Season 5 episode.

==== Raj Koothrappali ====
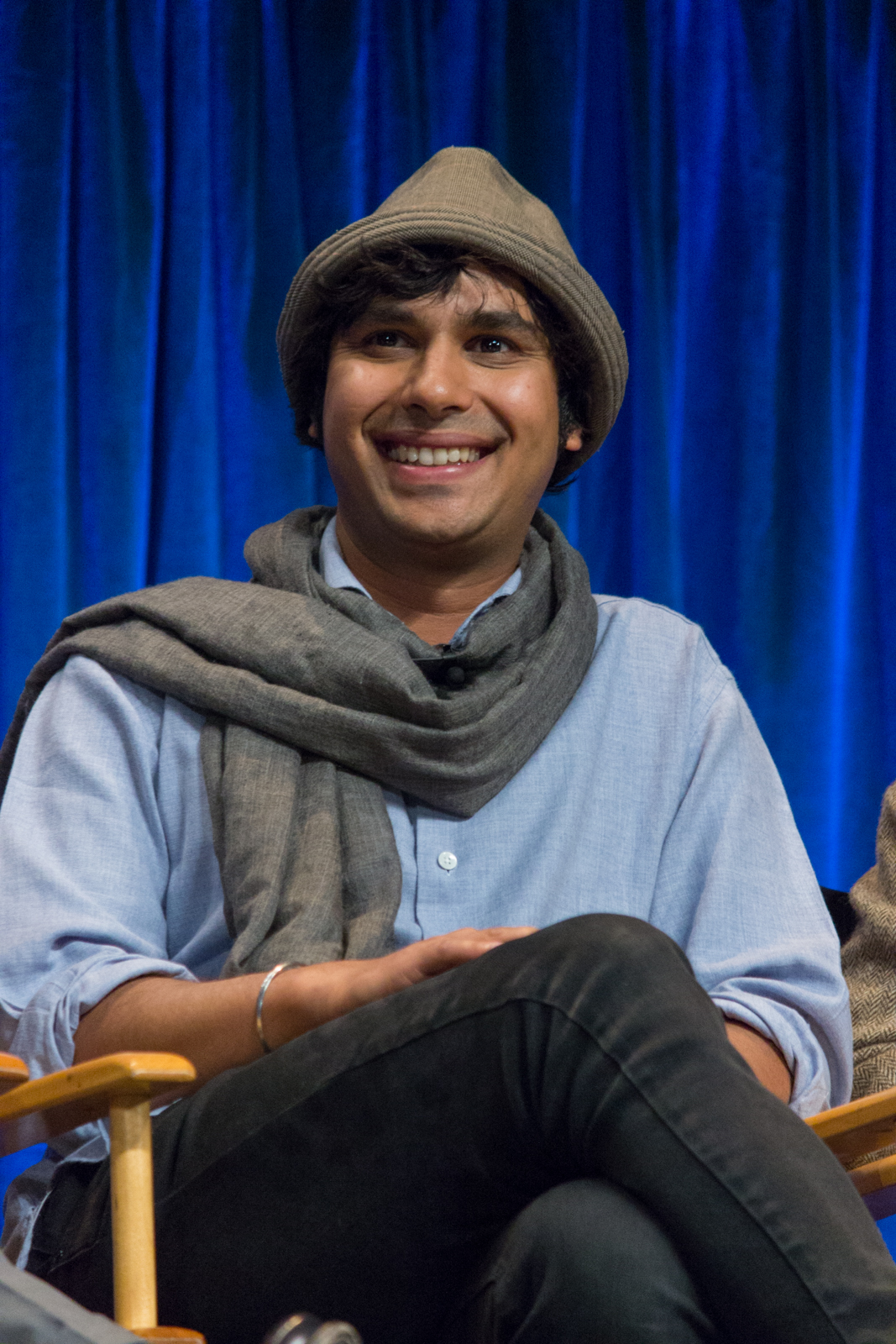
Kunal Nayyar

Rajesh Ramayan Koothrappali, PhD (portrayed by Kunal Nayyar, main: The Big Bang Theory seasons 1–12; recurring: Stuart Fails to Save the Universe season 1) is Howard Wolowitz's best friend. Often called "Raj" by his friends, he is from New Delhi, India, and works in the physics department at Caltech, researching astroparticle physics. Raj comes from a very wealthy family in India, and often communicates with his parents, Dr. and Mrs. Koothrappali, via webcam. He did at least part of his higher education at the University of Cambridge and like most of the scientists bar Wolowitz, Raj also has a PhD. He has a younger sister, Priya. He lives in an apartment in Pasadena. As with his friends, he is mutually involved with and obsessed with science fiction and comic books in general. He is also a fan of Harry Potter and Indian music, but appreciates the Indian lullabies his mother sang and the catchiness of Hindi phrases. Unlike his male friends, Raj has many feminine interests, such as reading Archie comics and Twilight and watching chick flicks such as Bridget Jones's Diary. It is speculated that Raj might be gay due to his feminine interests and his close friendship with Howard, with whom he has arguments similar to those of a married couple. However, Raj has always stated that he is straight, but metrosexual. He was infatuated with Penny, and secretly wrote love poems about Bernadette.

Raj is a Hindu and believes in karma (reincarnation), but eats beef. He is very shy around women outside of his family, and during the first six seasons of the show, found himself unable to speak to women while in their presence unless he drank alcoholic beverages, or believed he had done so. He eventually is able to get over this condition and starts to, unsuccessfully and for short periods, date women.

Raj makes a brief non-speaking cameo as a child in the Season 2 finale of Young Sheldon, he was portrayed by Rishabh Prabhat as a child.

==== Leslie Winkle ====
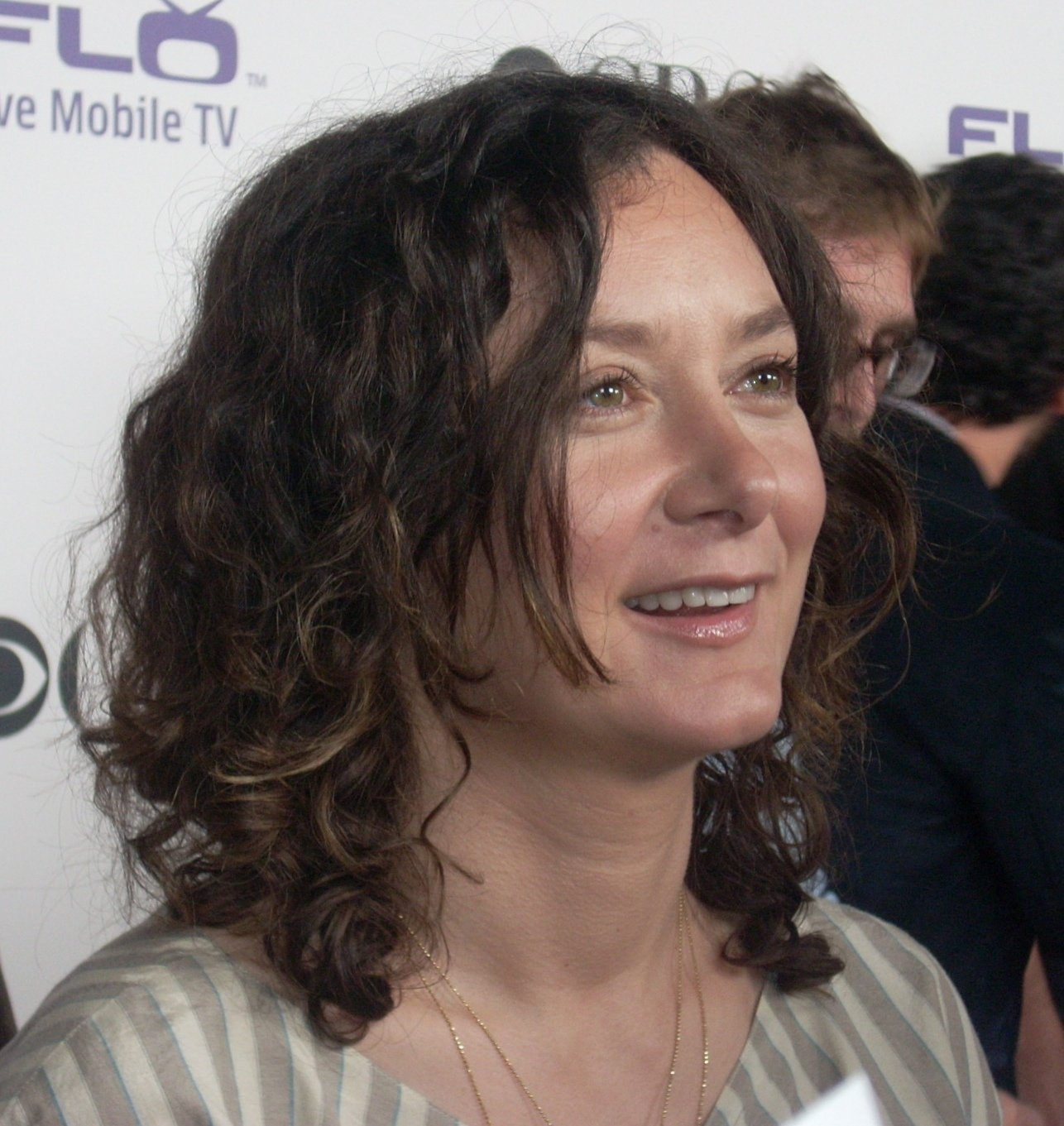
Sara Gilbert

Leslie Winkle, PhD (portrayed by Sara Gilbert; main: season 2; recurring: season 1; guest: seasons 3 and 9) is an experimental physicist who shares her lab with Leonard. In appearance, she is essentially Leonard's female counterpart, equipped with black-framed glasses and sweat jackets. She has lazy eye. She is one of Sheldon's archenemies due to their conflicting scientific ideas and takes every opportunity to insult Sheldon for mistreating her. However, she and Sheldon are later shown to be more friendly and her antagonism becomes increasingly less malicious and more playful.

The character is based on Gilda, a coworker to Leonard and Sheldon envisioned by creators Chuck Lorre and Bill Prady in the unaired original pilot.

==== Bernadette Rostenkowski ====
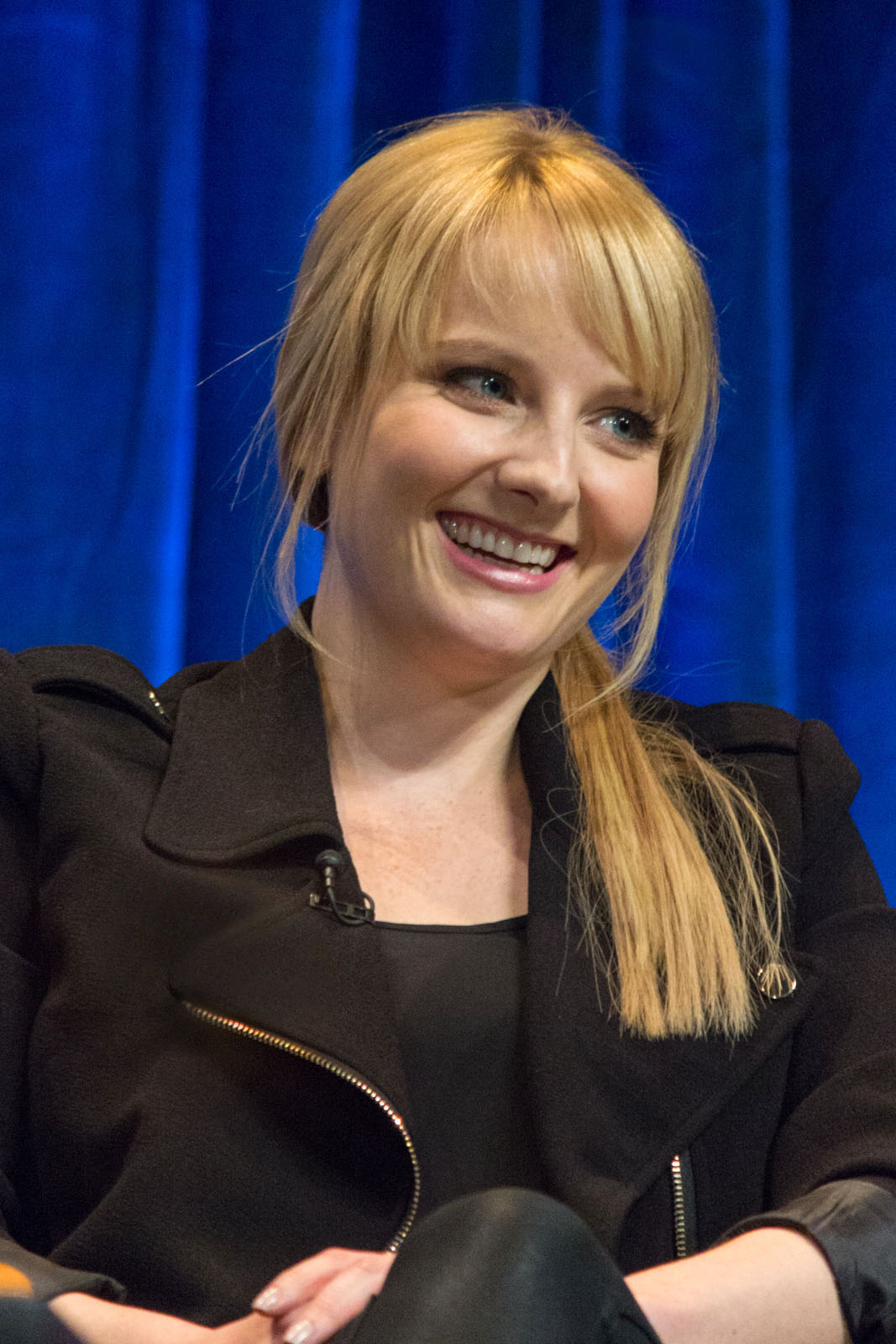
Melissa Rauch

Bernadette Maryann Rostenkowski-Wolowitz, PhD (portrayed by Melissa Rauch; main: The Big Bang Theory seasons 4–12; recurring: The Big Bang Theory season 3, Stuart Fails to Save the Universe season 1) is originally a waitress and co-worker of Penny's at The Cheesecake Factory, using her wages to pay for her graduate studies in microbiology. She is a smart, short-tempered, ruthless, competitive young woman. Despite her short stature and squeaky voice, she is regarded as being intimidating, largely because of her sharp tongue, aggressive demeanor and tendency to be a bully. A recurring joke in the series references Bernadette and her lab team handling dangerous or infectious specimens, leading to accidental byproducts.

Bernadette's approach to business and science is often shown to be somewhat unethical, which she acknowledges often in a cheerful or nonchalant way.

While initially not getting along with Howard's mother, she eventually becomes like her, domineering and passive aggressive, even adopting her signature yell.

Bernadette has a strong maternal personality on many occasions, and is one of the few characters who can easily control Sheldon, and frequently shows him more empathy than others might.

She and Howard have two children, Halley and Neil Michael (whom they call Michael), in seasons 10 and 11 respectively.

Bernadette is of Polish origin and Catholic upbringing, and was originally seen wearing a cross necklace.

Bernadette makes a brief non-speaking cameo as a child in the Season 2 finale of Young Sheldon, she was portrayed by A. J. Coggeshall as a child.

==== Amy Fowler ====
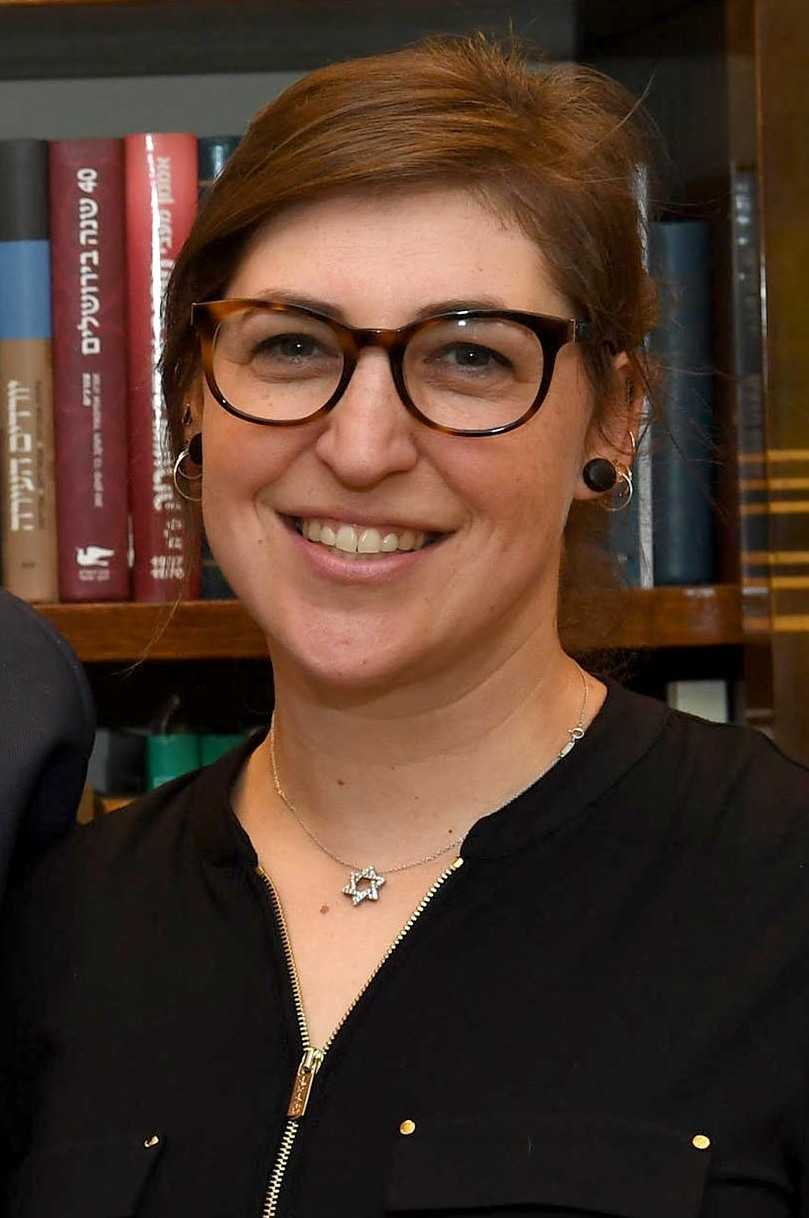
Mayim Bialik

Amy Farrah Fowler, PhD (portrayed by Mayim Bialik; main The Big Bang Theory: seasons 4–12; guest: The Big Bang Theory season 3, Young Sheldon season 4 and 7, Stuart Fails to Save the Universe season 1) is a neuroscientist with a research focus on addiction in primates and invertebrates, occasionally mentioning such experiments involving addiction. (Bialik herself has a PhD in neuroscience.) She is Sheldon's love interest in the series, and they marry at the end of season 11. They are revealed to have children in Young Sheldon.

Early on, Amy is essentially a female counterpart to Sheldon; as the series progresses, she begins a campaign to increase Sheldon's feelings for her by becoming more involved in his interests, including video games and Star Trek, and treating him as his mother did.

In 2020, a year after The Big Bang Theory went off the air, it was revealed that Kate Micucci, who ultimately got the role of Lucy, had auditioned for the role of Amy Farrah Fowler.

Amy makes two appearances in Young Sheldon. She makes an appearance as a child in the Season 2 finale where she is portrayed in a non-speaking role by Lily Sanfelippo. Bialik returns to play Amy in the narration of the season 4 premiere, and in a physical appearance in the series finale.

==== Stuart Bloom ====
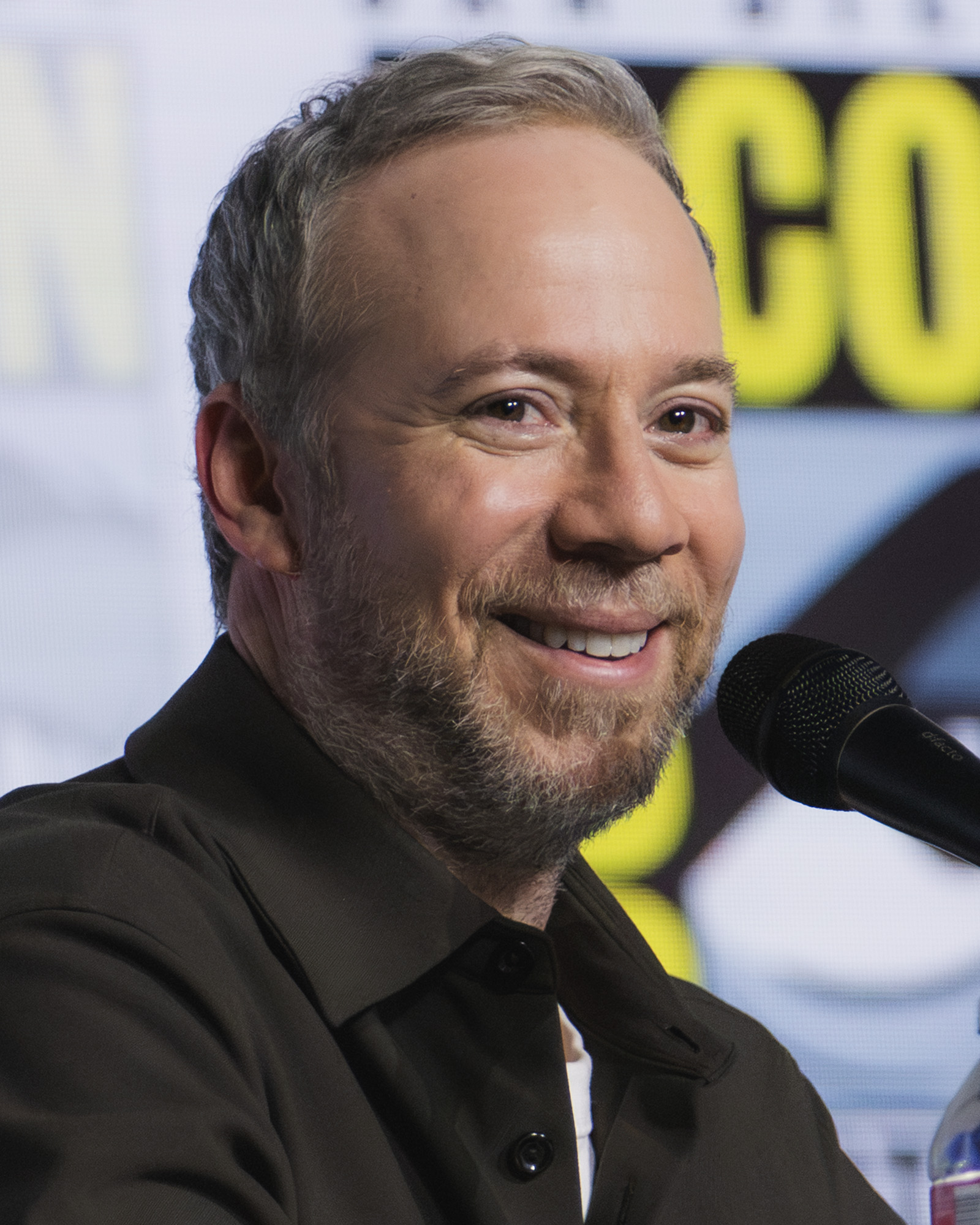
Kevin Sussman

Stuart David Bloom (portrayed by Kevin Sussman; main: The Big Bang Theory seasons 6 and 8–12, Stuart Fails to Save the Universe; recurring: The Big Bang Theory seasons 2–5 and 7) runs the Comic Center in Pasadena, the comic book store that the characters often visit. Stuart is characterized by his low self-esteem and loneliness, which often result in pathetic attempts to engage with women and win favor with the gang. This is despite owning his own business and being a talented portraiture artist who attended the Rhode Island School of Design.

One of the running gags on the show is Stuart's medical situation. It is depicted as disastrous, so much so that he can be seen under various medical treatments. He is said to have depression and possible malnutrition, among other problems. In the last season, Stuart's life seems to be turning around. His comic store becomes successful and he gets a steady, long-term relationship.

Kevin Sussman was a recurring guest actor from seasons two to five, and was promoted to starring role for the sixth season onwards.

Stuart is the main protagonist of his own spin-off series Stuart Fails to Save the Universe.

==== Emily Sweeney ====
Emily Sweeney, M.D., (portrayed by Laura Spencer; main: season 9; recurring: seasons 7–8; guest: season 10) is a dermatology resident at Huntington Hospital, whom Raj finds on an online dating site. Raj enlists Amy's help to be his "online wingman" and talk to Emily in his behalf. Amy tells Emily about this and it puts her off. Amy and Emily end up hitting it off, having both gone to Harvard and both being into quilting. While Amy and Emily are at lunch together, Raj crashes the lunch. This drives Emily away from both Raj and Amy this time. Later, Raj and Emily meet again, accidentally and hit it off. They eventually double date with Howard and Bernadette, which horrifies Howard. He and Emily had a horrible date, which ended because Howard had gas station sushi, got food poisoning and clogged and overflowed her toilet. Emily is not afraid to stand up for herself or to others when necessary. She is shown to have a slightly alarming personality trait: she delights in the macabre. Raj ends up breaking up with her before Valentine's Day so he could be with Claire (Alessandra Olivia Toreson). Unfortunately for Raj, Claire had just gotten back together with her boyfriend. So, he eventually lost them both. Emily attempted to get back into Raj's good graces and did manage to sleep with him one last time, but it didn't last.

Laura Spencer was a recurring guest actress on the series in seasons seven and eight. During production of season 9, she was promoted to a "fractional" starring role; the upgraded status ensured her availability on an as-needed basis, without requiring her in every episode. She returned as a guest in season 10.

=== Young Sheldon main characters ===
==== Mary Cooper ====
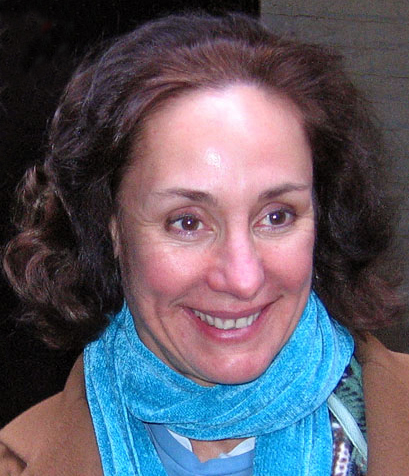
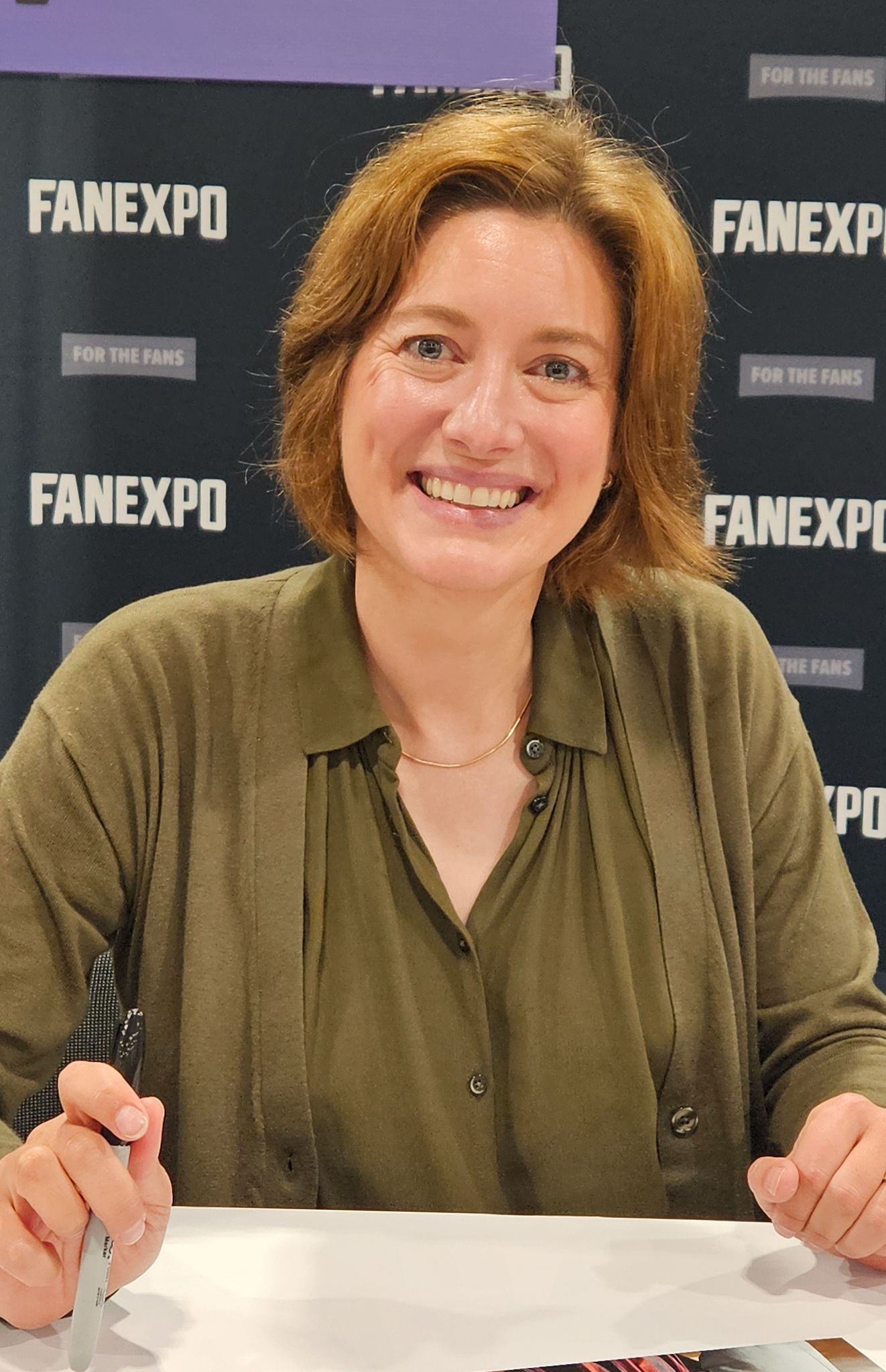
Laurie Metcalf (left) and Zoe Perry (right)

Mary Cooper (née Tucker) (portrayed by Laurie Metcalf in The Big Bang Theory; recurring: seasons 7 and 9–12; guest: seasons 1 and 3–5 and by Zoe Perry in Young Sheldon and Georgie & Mandy's First Marriage) is Sheldon's short-tempered, overprotective but loving mother from Texas. Leonard once described her to Penny as "Sheldon's kryptonite" because she is able to control Sheldon. A devout Southern Baptist, she also has two other children—Sheldon's twin sister, Missy, and older brother, Georgie, who is five years older than the twins. Her husband, a rambunctious alcoholic, was also named George, but he later died in Sheldon's childhood. To Mary's relief, her other children do not share Sheldon's precociousness, even once commenting to Leonard, "I thank the good Lord my other kids are as dumb as soup."

For her part, Mary is not an intellectual but is highly experienced in life, though she is prone to making outdated and insensitive remarks. She is nevertheless kind at heart and is tolerant of other faiths. Leonard wishes his mother were as loving as Sheldon's mother, although Sheldon himself appears at best ambivalent about her parenting. Sheldon mentions that Mary once hit him with a Bible because he refused to eat his Brussels sprouts. She apparently thought something was wrong with her son while he was growing up since Sheldon will often remark after someone calls him crazy, "I'm not crazy; my mother had me tested!" Mary confirms this, though she wishes that she had taken him to Houston for a follow-up examination.

A younger version of Mary, played by Zoe Perry, is a main character in the prequel series Young Sheldon. Perry is Metcalf's real life daughter.

==== George Cooper Sr. ====
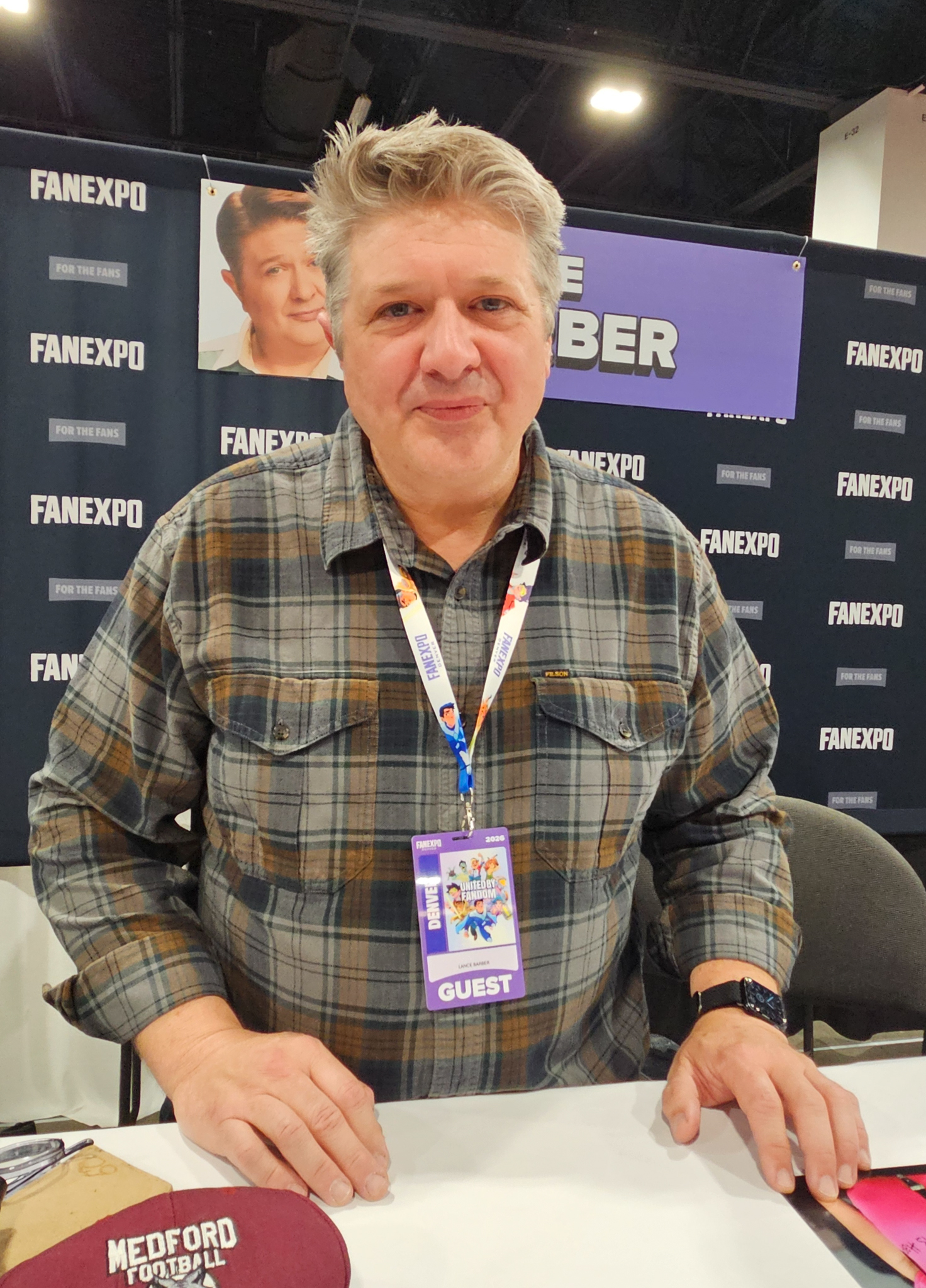
Lance Barber

George Cooper Sr. (portrayed by Lance Barber; main: Young Sheldon; guest: The Big Bang Theory season 12 and Georgie & Mandy's First Marriage seasons 1,2) was the husband of Mary Cooper and father of Georgie, Sheldon, and Missy. He was the high school football coach for Medford High. In The Big Bang Theory, it is established that he died when Sheldon and Missy were fourteen years old due to an off-screen heart attack.

Barber previously portrayed Jimmy Speckerman in one episode of The Big Bang Theory (guest: season 5).

==== Georgie Cooper ====
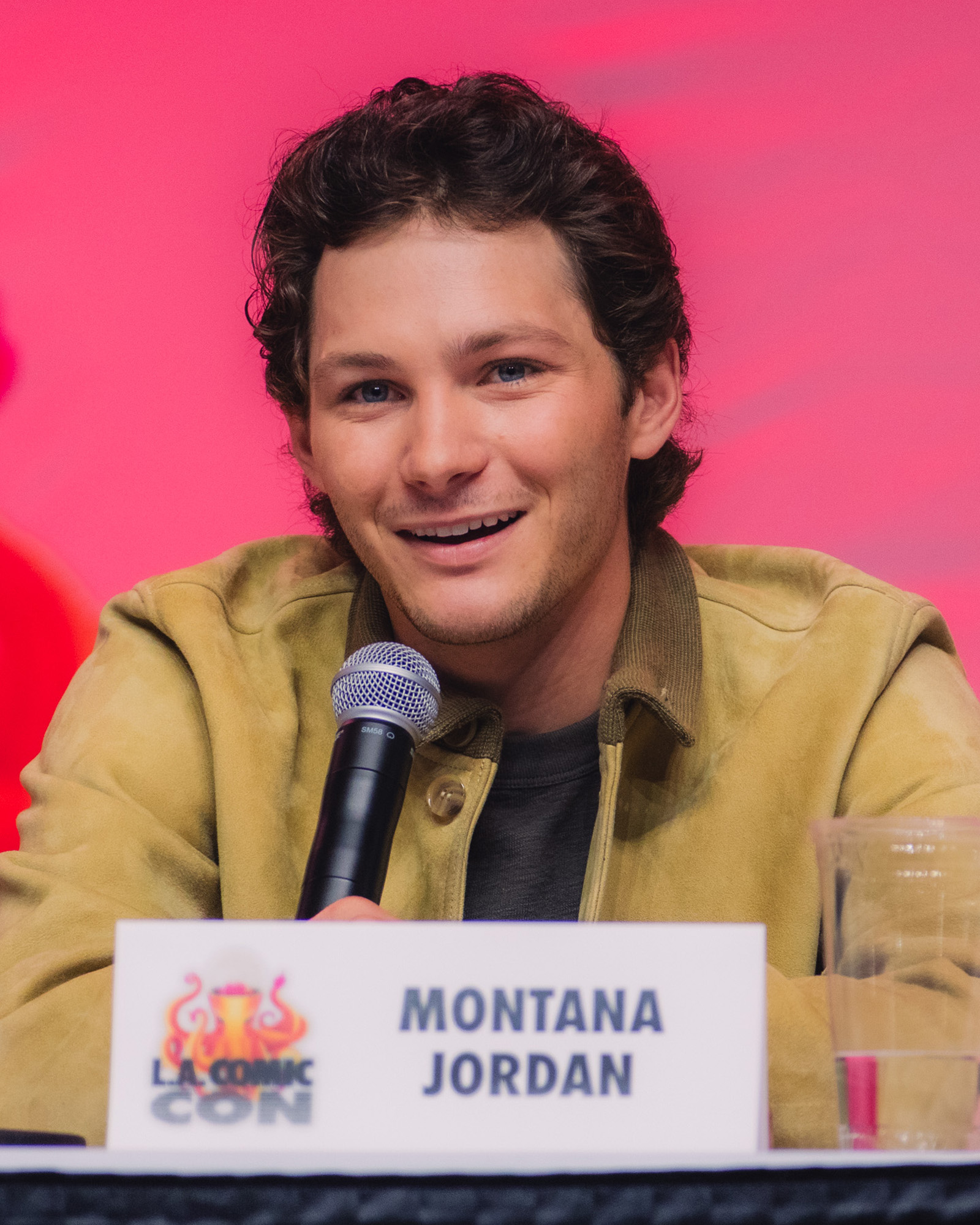
Montana Jordan

George Marshall "Georgie" Cooper Jr. (portrayed by Jerry O'Connell as an adult; recurring: The Big Bang Theory seasons 11–12 and Montana Jordan as a youth; Young Sheldon and Georgie & Mandy's First Marriage) is Sheldon and Missy's older brother who resides in Texas and runs a car tire business. Often at odds while growing up, the Cooper brothers later reconcile as adults. George Jr. is a laid-back character who likes to make money and is a known womanizer. By season 12 of The Big Bang Theory, it is revealed that he has been twice married and divorced.

In Young Sheldon, he has a brief fling with Mandy McAllister, a woman 12 years his senior, resulting in Mandy becoming pregnant. Although Mandy wanted to raise their child alone, Georgie chose to "man up" and marry Mandy, nurturing their fledgling infatuation into a proper relationship. Their daughter is named Constance (nicknamed CeeCee), after Meemaw.

==== Missy Cooper ====
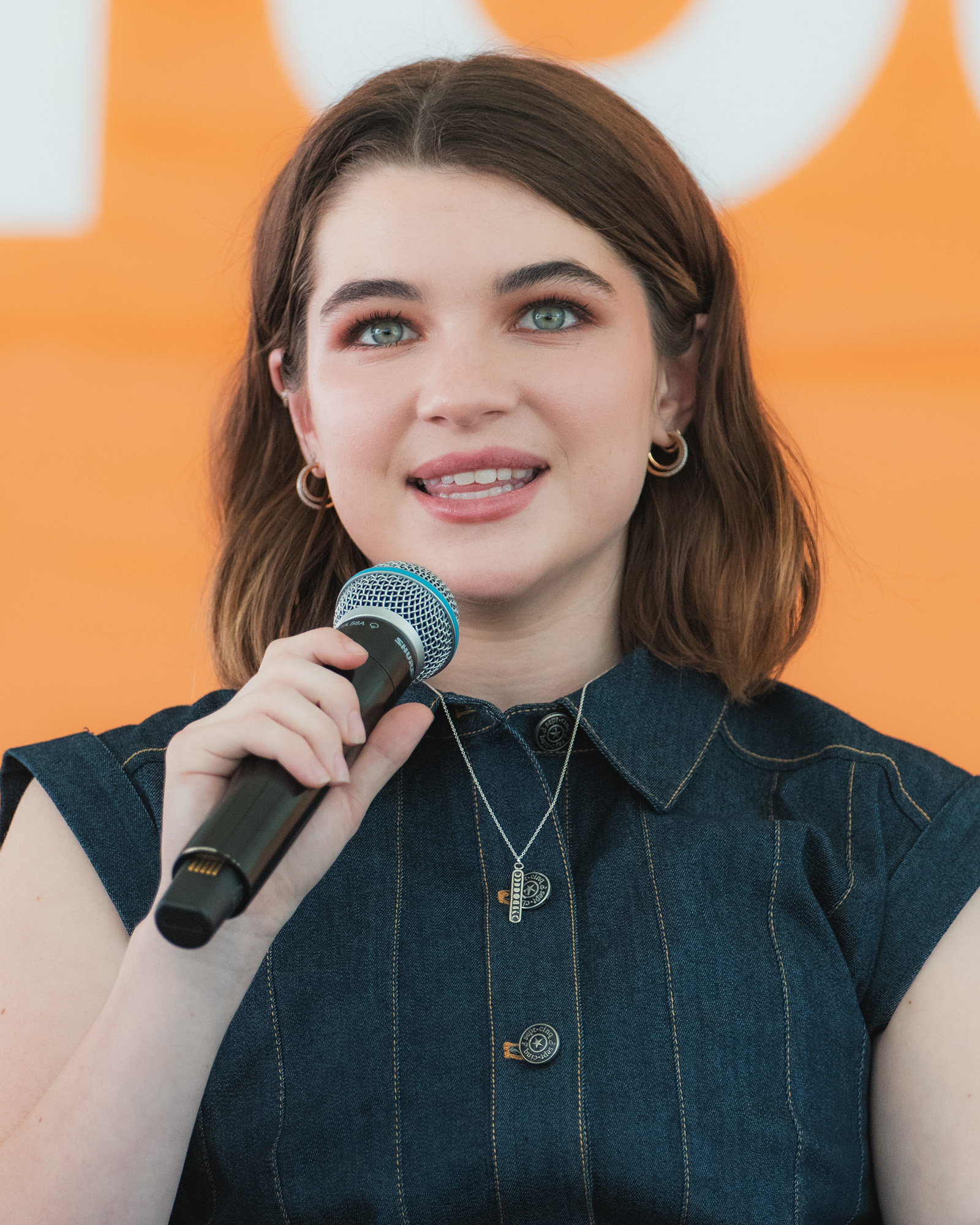
Raegan Revord

Melissa "Missy" Cooper (Courtney Henggeler as an adult; guest: seasons 1, 7, and 11 and Raegan Revord as a child, main: Young Sheldon, recurring: Georgie & Mandy's First Marriage) is not as academically accomplished as her twin brother but displays better social skills. As a child, she was obsessed with Alf. In season three of Young Sheldon, Missy joins the baseball team in the fictional town of Medford. While Sheldon finishes high school and matriculates at university, Missy navigates the ordinary challenges of adolescence. Despite their differences, the twins are pretty close.

As an adult in The Big Bang Theory, Missy is a tall, attractive woman who promptly catches the attention of Leonard, Howard, and Raj. She occasionally visits Sheldon, whom she calls a "rocket scientist" to her friends, much to his annoyance.

==== Constance "Connie" Tucker ("Meemaw") ====
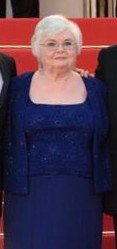
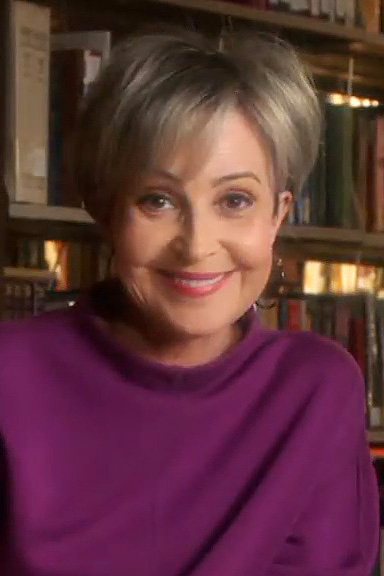
June Squibb (left) and Annie Potts (right)

Constance "Connie" Tucker (June Squibb in The Big Bang Theory; guest: season 9 and Annie Potts in Young Sheldon; guest: season 1 in Georgie & Mandy's First Marriage) is Mary's mother, George Sr.'s mother-in-law, and maternal grandmother to Georgie, Sheldon, and Missy, who call her "Meemaw". Like Sheldon's other family members, she is also native to Texas and is their neighbor in the town of Medford. Connie is depicted as free-spirited, adventurous and outspoken. Sheldon sees himself as her favorite grandchild, and Connie nicknames him "Moonpie". Sheldon, in turn, is very affectionate toward and protective of her. Meemaw is often mentioned by Sheldon but did not appear on the series until episode 14 of season nine, "The Meemaw Materialization".

In Young Sheldon, recurring themes are her significant gambling habit and active dating life.

==== Pastor Jeff Difford ====
Pastor Jeff Difford (portrayed by Matt Hobby; main: Young Sheldon seasons 3–7; recurring: seasons 1–2 and Georgie & Mandy's First Marriage) is the upbeat lead pastor of a local Baptist church in Medford that Sheldon's family attends in Young Sheldon. Like Mary, he, too, sometimes has friction with Sheldon's atheistic side but often encourages Sheldon to explore his own ideas logically.

==== Billy Sparks ====
Billy Sparks (portrayed by Wyatt McClure; main: Young Sheldon seasons 5–7; recurring: seasons 1–4) is a boy who lives with his parents and sister next to the Coopers and Meemaw. He has been mentioned in The Big Bang Theory as one of Sheldon's childhood bullies, although in Young Sheldon, he is rather good-natured and at times is friends with Sheldon but is shown to be extremely dim-witted.

==== Mandy McAllister ====
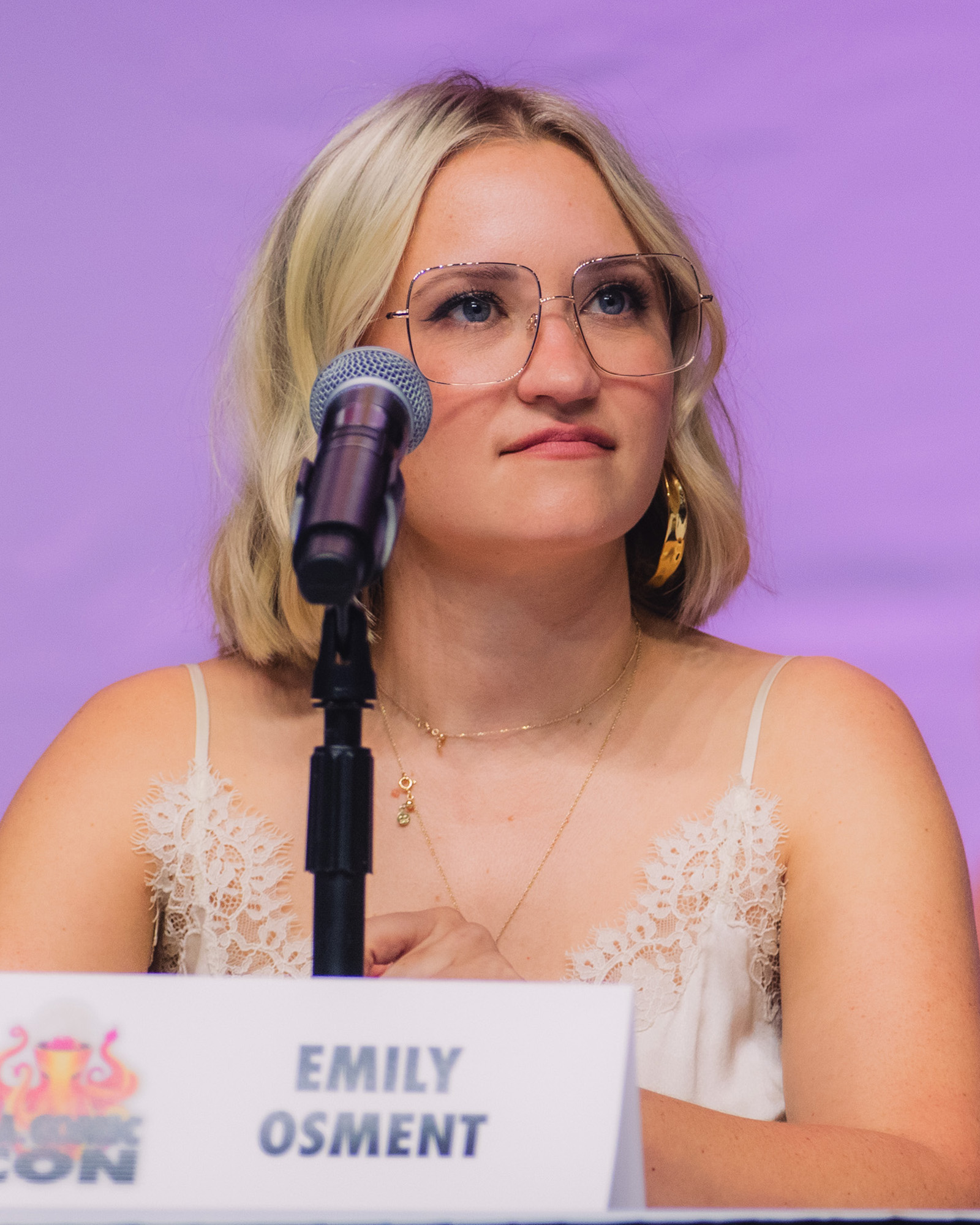
Emily Osment

Amanda Elizabeth "Mandy" McAllister (portrayed by Emily Osment; main: Young Sheldon seasons 6–7 and Georgie & Mandy's First Marriage; recurring: Young Sheldon season 5) is Georgie's wife who is 11 years his senior. Georgie gets her pregnant as a teenager after he lies to her about his age. By the time of The Big Bang Theory, Georgie and Mandy have divorced as Sheldon receives congratulations on his Nobel Prize from several ex-sisters-in-law.

=== Georgie & Mandy's First Marriage main characters ===
==== Jim McAllister ====
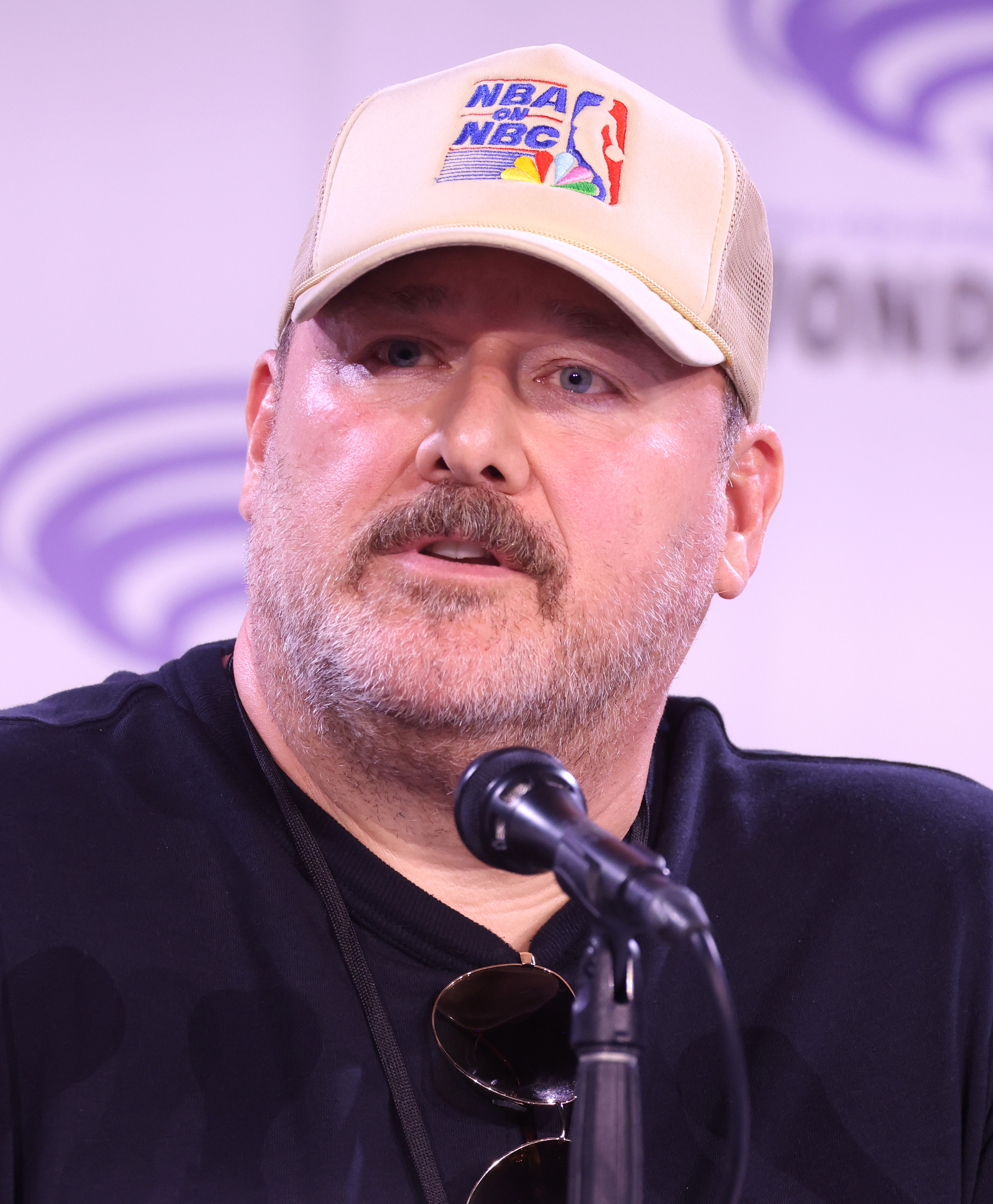
Will Sasso

Jim McAllister (portrayed by Will Sasso; recurring: Young Sheldon seasons 6–7; main: Georgie & Mandy's First Marriage) is Mandy's father and who owns the tire store that Georgie works at. He is a henpecked husband to Audrey and tries his best to be a supportive father and father in-law, despite his wife's disapproval of Georgie.

==== Audrey McAllister ====
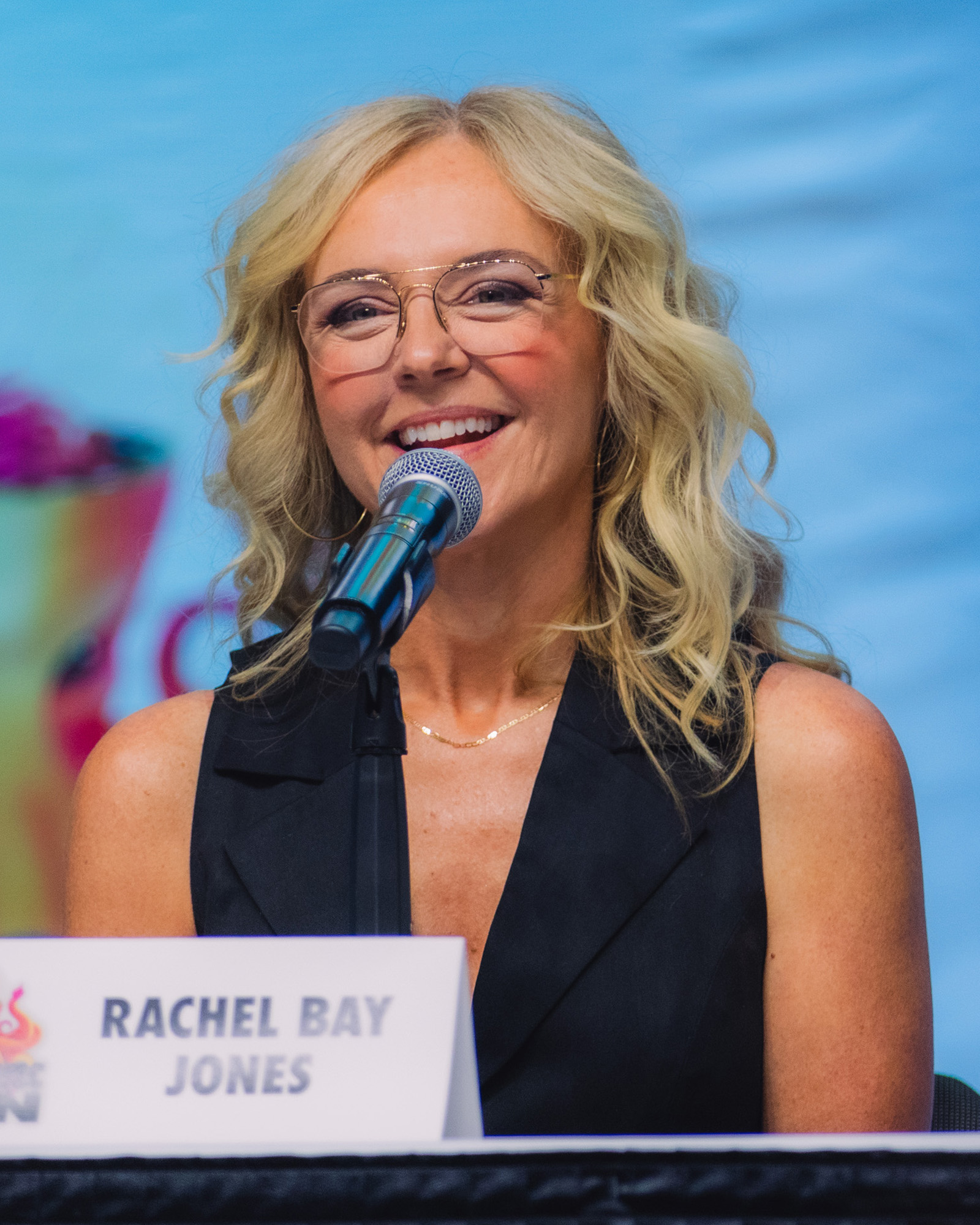
Rachel Bay Jones

Audrey McAllister (portrayed by Rachel Bay Jones; recurring: Young Sheldon seasons 6–7; main: Georgie & Mandy's First Marriage) is Mandy's short tempered, nitpicky and often rude mother, and wife to Jim McAllister. Audrey openly disapproves of Georgie after he knocked up Mandy, and ignores his best efforts to win her over. She is extremely protective of her introverted son Connor, despite him being a fully-grown adult. Audrey often has control over Jim and is quick to shut him down if he does something she doesn't agree with.

==== Connor McAllister ====
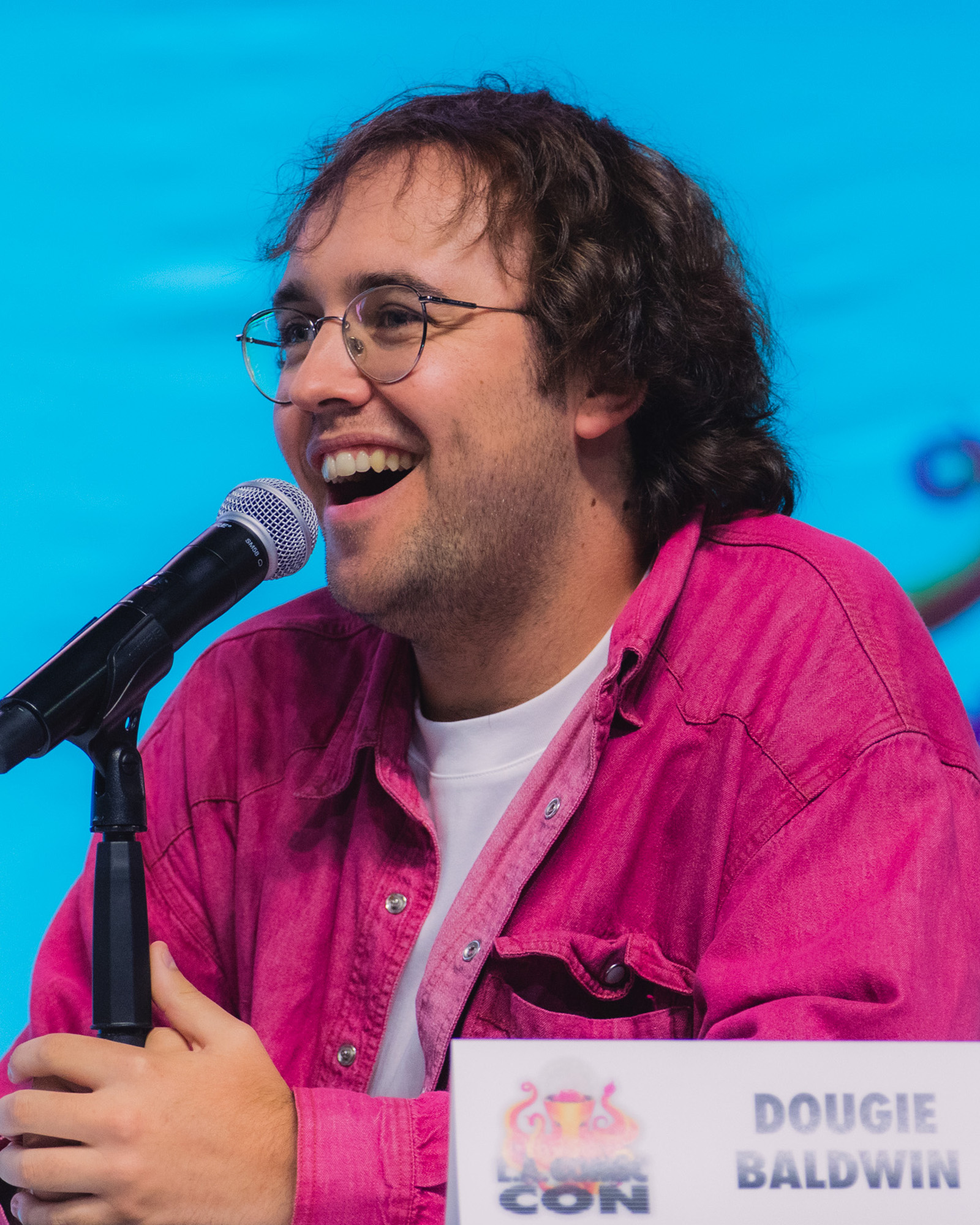
Dougie Baldwin

Connor McAllister (portrayed by Joseph Apollonio in Young Sheldon; guest: season 6 and Dougie Baldwin in Georgie & Mandy's First Marriage) is Mandy's introverted and unemployed brother and youngest child of Jim and Audrey. Connor is a musician and spends most of his time in his room. He and Georgie have a good relationship, and he pretends to take interest in Connor's hobbies. Connor is very protected by Audrey, and doesn't share much of a relationship with Jim due to their differences.

==== Ruben Alvarez ====
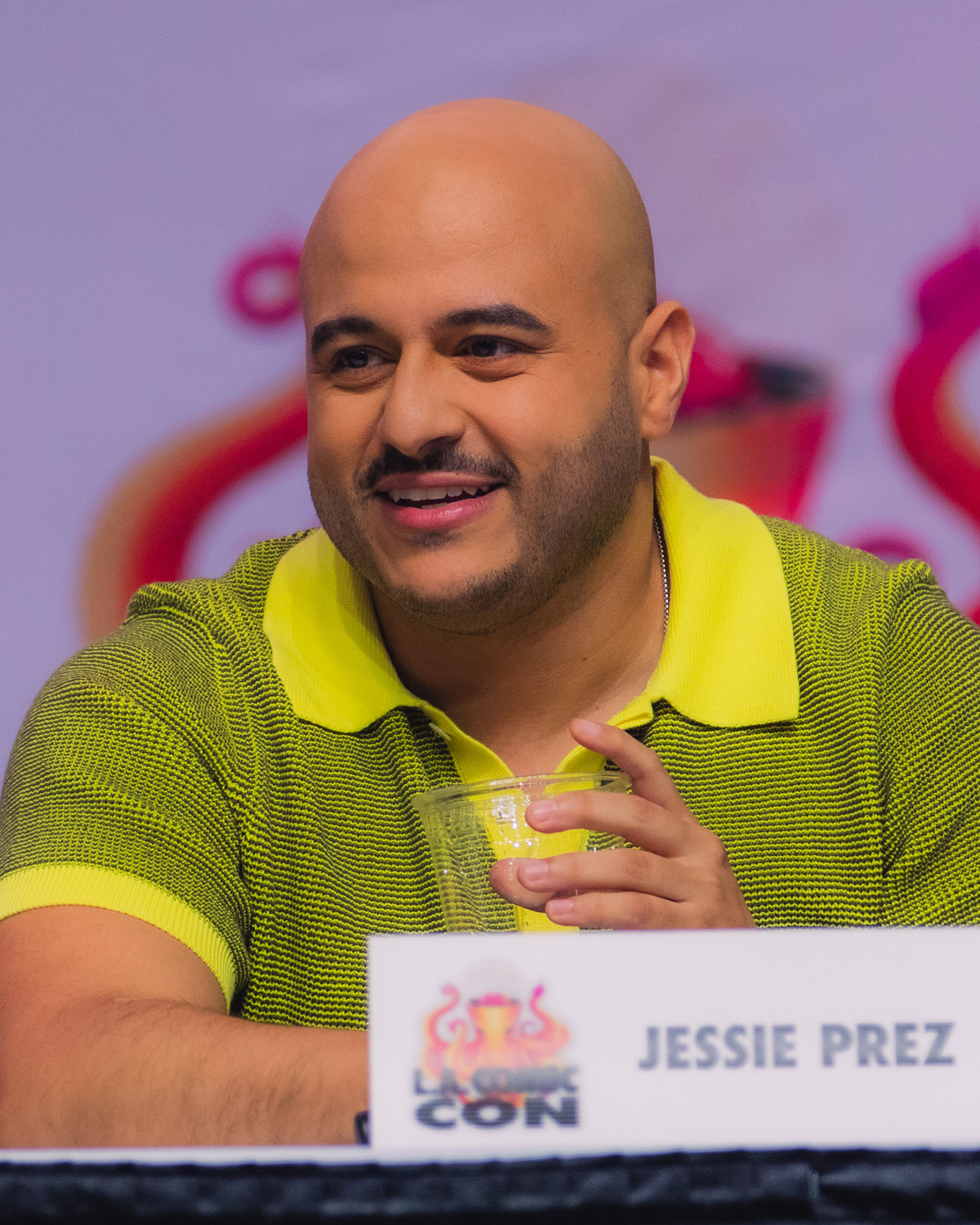
Jessie Prez

Ruben (portrayed by Jessie Prez) is Georgie's colleague who works with him at Jim's tire store. He is constantly disparaging towards Georgie for being Jim's son-in-law, feeling like Georgie only got the job through nepotism. At the end of the first season, he helps Georgie buy the tire store and becomes co-owner with him.

=== Stuart Fails to Save the Universe main characters ===
==== Denise ====
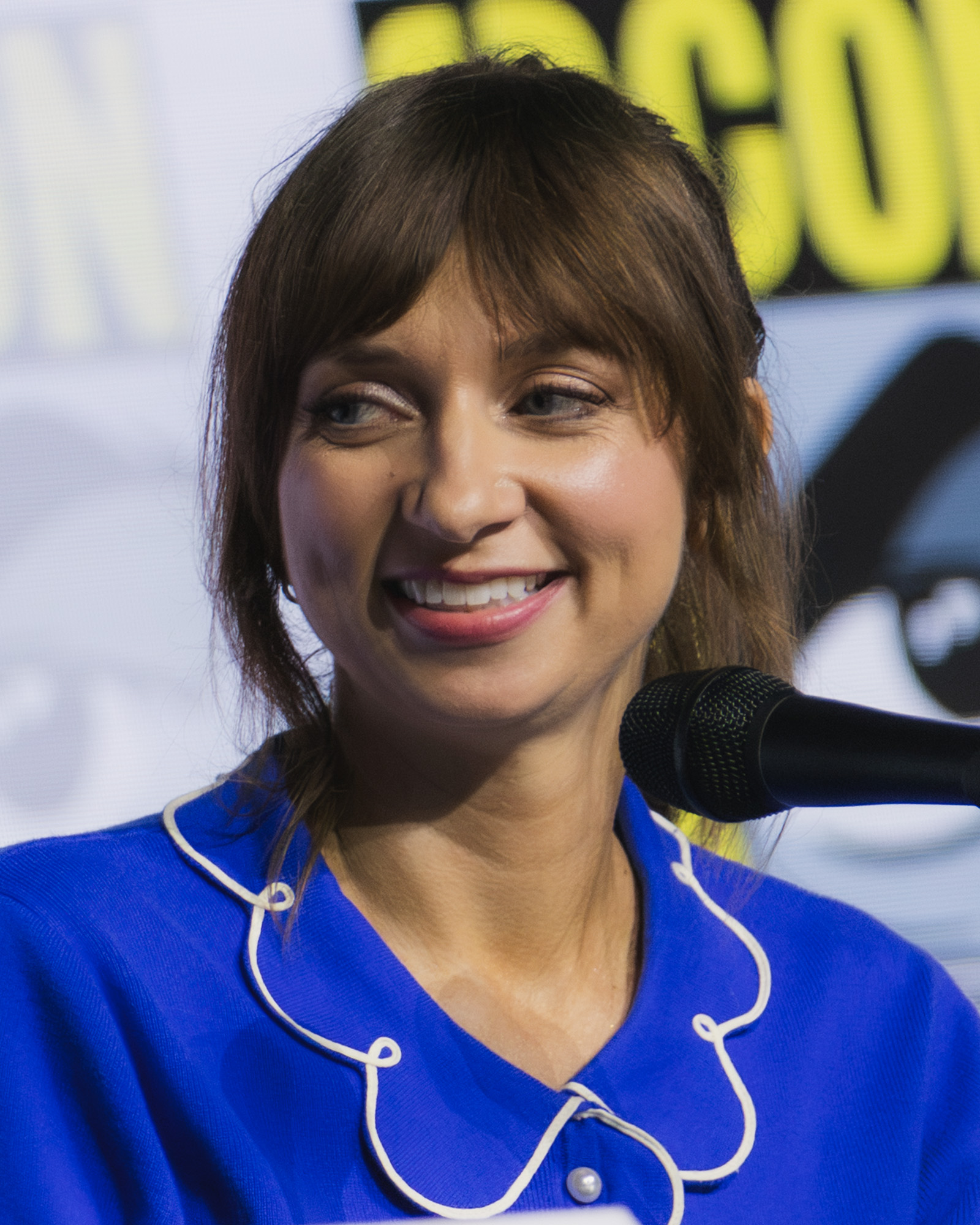
Lauren Lapkus

Denise (portrayed by Lauren Lapkus; recurring: The Big Bang Theory seasons 11–12; main: Stuart Fails to Save the Universe) is the assistant manager at Stuart's comic book store. She is quite a comic book geek. She first appears in season 11. At first, Sheldon does not like the change that comes with her hiring but later changes his mind because of her comic book knowledge and her ability to figure out his preferences in comic books. In Season 12, she enters a relationship with Stuart. Denise appears in Stuart Fails to Save the Universe as a main character.

==== Bert Kibbler ====
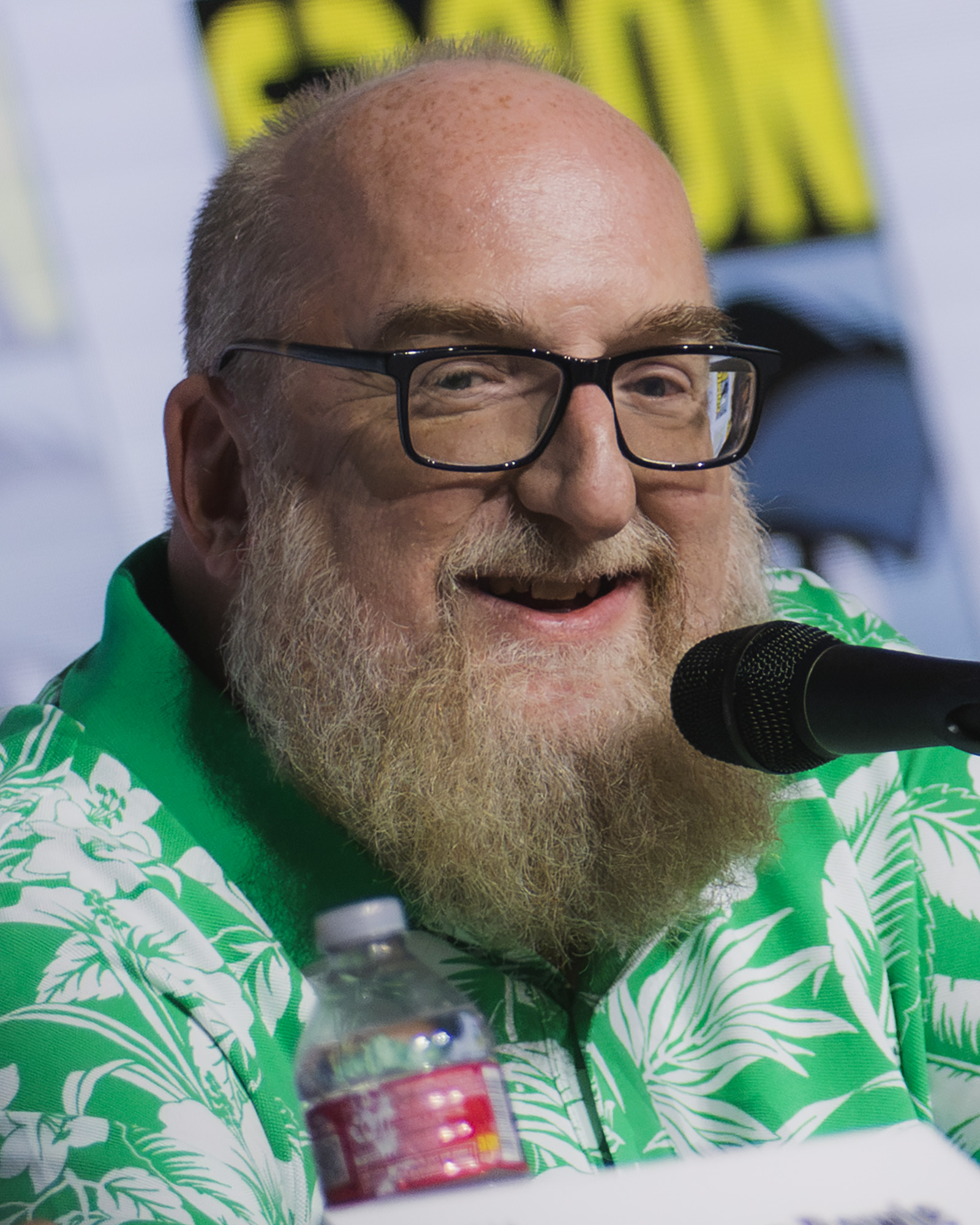
Brian Posehn

Professor Bertram Kibbler (portrayed by Brian Posehn; guest: The Big Bang Theory seasons 6–7; recurring: seasons 10–12; main: Stuart Fails to Save the Universe) is a geologist at Caltech, who meets Amy while she was working there in her own lab in the episode "The Occupation Recalibration"—where he attempts to ask her on a date, but is disheartened to learn that she is already in a relationship. In Season 10 ("The Geology Elevation"), he wins the $500,000 MacArthur Fellowship grant, which makes Sheldon jealous. In Season 11, Bert asks Sheldon to collaborate with him. He joins Raj and Howard in their band, and sings a song from the point of view of the boulder seen near the beginning of the movie Raiders of the Lost Ark (1981). In season 12, Bert asks for Raj's help in cutting open a meteorite, and in the series finale, looks after Cinnamon for Raj, intending to use her to help him get girls. Bert appears in Stuart Fails to Save the Universe as a main character.

==== Barry Kripke ====
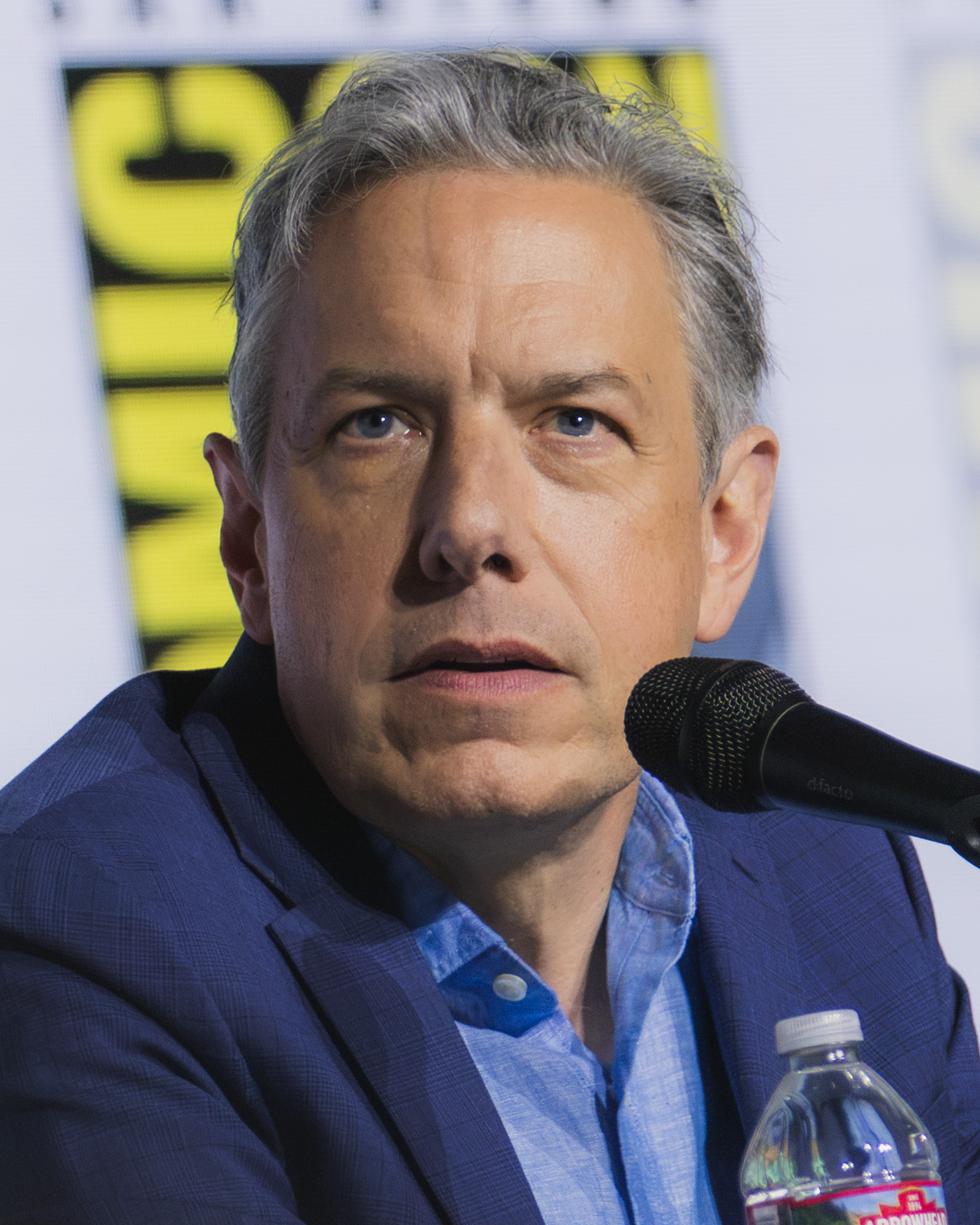
John Ross Bowie

Barry Kripke, PhD (portrayed by John Ross Bowie; recurring: The Big Bang Theory seasons 2–3, 5—9 and 11–12; guest: seasons 4 and 10; main: Stuart Fails to Save the Universe) is a colleague working in plasma physics who frequently clashes with Sheldon. Kripke has a case of rhotacism in which he pronounces the letters "R" and "L" as "W" in much the same way as Elmer Fudd from Looney Tunes, Jimmy Five from Monica's Gang and Gilda Radner in her "Baba Wawa" sketches. He first appears in the Season 2 episode "The Killer Robot Instability" pitting his robot, the Kripke Krippler against that of the main characters. He is a recurring rival of Sheldon. Kripke appears in Stuart Fails to Save the Universe as a main character.

== Supporting characters ==
=== Cast table ===
List indicators

This section includes characters who have appeared in The Big Bang Theory and Young Sheldon series with recurring role.

- An empty grey cell indicates the character was not in the season.
- ^{V} indicates a voice-only role.
- ^{P} indicates a posthumous appearance using archived voice recording.

= Recurring cast (2+ episodes)
= Guest cast (1 episode)

Character	Portrayed by	The Big Bang Theory												Young Sheldon							Georgie & Mandy's First Marriage			Stuart Fails to Save the Universe
Character	Portrayed by	1	2	3	4	5	6	7	8	9	10	11	12	1	2	3	4	5	6	7	1	2	3	1
Althea Robinson	Vernee Watson	R			G	G					G			G	G									
Kurt	Brian Patrick Wade	R	G																					
Eric Gablehauser	Mark Harelik	R	R																					
Mrs. Wolowitz	Carol Ann Susi	Recurring^{V}	Recurring^{V}	Recurring^{V}	Recurring^{V}	Recurring^{V}	Recurring^{V}	Recurring^{V}	Recurring^{V}	Recurring^{V}			G^{V}^{P}											
Mrs. Wolowitz	Pamela Adlon														G^{V}									
V. M. Koothrappali	Brian George	G	R	G	R	R			R		R	G	R											
Mrs. Koothrappali	Alice Amter	G	R	G	R	R			G															
Ramona Nowitzki	Riki Lindhome		G								G	G												R
Stephanie Barnett	Sara Rue		R																					
Beverly Hofstadter	Christine Baranski (Note: Baranski also makes an appearance in Stuart Fails to Save the Universe as an alternate version of herself.)		G	G		G		R	G	Recurring	Recurring	Recurring	Recurring		G^{V}									G
Wil Wheaton	Wil Wheaton			R	G	R	G	R	G	R		R	G											G
Zack Johnson	Brian Thomas Smith			G	R			R		Guest	Guest	Guest	R											G
Mrs. Fowler	Annie O'Donnell				G																			
Mrs. Fowler	Kathy Bates											G	R											
Priya Koothrappali	Aarti Mann				R	R																		
Wyatt	Keith Carradine				G					G	G		R											
President Siebert	Joshua Malina				G	R						G	R											G
Mike Rostenkowski	Casey Sander					R	G	R		G														
Dimitri Rezinov	Pasha Lychnikoff					G	R																	
Alex Jensen	Margo Harshman						R																	
Janine Davis	Regina King						R	G	G			G	G											
Lucy	Kate Micucci						R	G			G													
Arthur Jeffries	Bob Newhart						G	R		G		G	G	G		G^{V}								
Dan	Stephen Root								R															
Dave Gibbs	Stephen Merchant									R														
Claire	Alessandra Torresani									R	G													
Alfred Hofstadter	Judd Hirsch									G	G													
Colonel Richard Williams	Dean Norris										R	G												G
Ruchi	Swati Kapila											R												
Mr. Fowler	Teller (Note: Teller also makes an appearance in Stuart Fails to Save the Universe alongside Penn as alternate versions of themselves.)											G	R											G
Anu	Rati Gupta												R											
Tam Nguyen	Robert Wu												G											
Tam Nguyen	Ryan Phuong													Recurring	Recurring	Recurring	Recurring			G				
Marissa Johnson	Lindsey Kraft												R											
Dr. Kevin Campbell	Kal Penn												R											
Dr. Greg Pemberton	Sean Astin												R											
Victoria MacElroy	Valerie Mahaffey													Recurring	Recurring	Recurring								
Tom Petersen	Rex Linn													Recurring	Recurring	Recurring	Recurring	Recurring	Recurring	Recurring		G		
Hubert Givens	Brian Stepanek													Recurring	Recurring	Recurring	Recurring	G	G	G				
Evelyn Ingram	Danielle Pinnock													Recurring	Recurring	Recurring	G							
Coach Wayne Wilkins	Doc Farrow													Recurring	Recurring	Recurring	Recurring	Recurring	Recurring	Recurring	Guest	Guest		
Sheryl Hutchins	Sarah Baker													Recurring	Recurring	Recurring	G	G	G	G	G	G		
Herschel Sparks	Billy Gardell													R	R									
Peg	Nancy Linehan Charles													G	R	R	G	G		R				
Brenda Sparks	Melissa Peterman													Recurring	Recurring	Recurring	Recurring	Recurring	Recurring	Recurring				
Glenn	Chris Wylde													Guest	Guest	Guest								
John Sturgis	Wallace Shawn													Recurring	Recurring	Recurring	Recurring	Recurring	Recurring	Recurring				
Paige Swanson	Mckenna Grace														Recurring	Recurring	Recurring	Recurring	Recurring					
Linda Swanson	Andrea Anders														R	G	G		G					
Veronica Duncan	Isabel May														R	G	G							
Officer Robin	Mary Grill														G	R				G		G		
Dr. Grant Linkletter	Ed Begley Jr.														Recurring	Recurring	Recurring	Recurring	Recurring	Recurring				
Coach Dale Ballard	Craig T. Nelson															Recurring	Recurring	Recurring	Recurring	Recurring	Recurring	Recurring		
Jana Boggs	Ava Allan															Recurring	Recurring	Recurring						
Pastor Rob	Dan Byrd																Recurring	Recurring	Recurring					
CeeCee Cooper-McAllister	Isabelle & Zariah Booko																		Recurring	Recurring	Recurring	Recurring	Recurring	
Fred Fagenbacher	Matt Letscher																				Recurring	Recurring	Recurring	
Chloe Costa	Kara Arena																				Recurring	Recurring	G	
Beth	Casey Wilson																				R			
Scott	Christopher Gorham																				Recurring	Recurring		
Lindsey	Karen Malina White (Note: White also makes an appearance in the sixth season of Young Sheldon as a different character, Officer Larson, the police officer who pulls over Missy and Paige after they run away from home.)																		G			Recurring	Recurring	

=== The Big Bang Theory ===
==== Alex Jensen ====
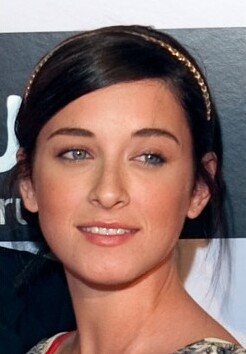
Margo Harshman

Alex Jensen (Margo Harshman) is a Caltech graduate student who appears in season six. Sheldon hires her to review his kindergarten and elementary-school notebooks for any possible Nobel Prize–winning research and attend to the tasks that Sheldon perceives as a waste of his own valuable time, such as buying Amy a Valentine's Day gift.

Alex attempts to initiate a relationship with Leonard despite his involvement with Penny, but he is oblivious to her romantic overtures.

==== Althea Robinson ====
Althea Robinson (Vernee Watson) is a nurse and receptionist at the hospital. She operates the sperm clinic during the original (unaired) Pilot episode when Leonard and Sheldon are considering donating. She is also present when Howard needs assistance delaying Leonard in order to set up a surprise party. In Season 4 when Howard had an accident with a robotic arm, she frees him by shutting down the computer. In Season 10, she appears in "The Birthday Synchronicity", serving as the delivery room nurse when Bernadette was delivering her baby, and is confused by the presence of Stuart and Raj alongside Howard, wondering if it is a "Mamma Mia!" scenario. She is also the only character besides Leonard and Sheldon to be carried over from the original unaired pilot. Watson also portrays a younger version of Robinson in several episodes of Young Sheldon.

==== Anu ====
Anu (Rati Gupta) is the woman whom Raj's father wants him to marry. She first appears in season 12 and works at a hotel as a concierge. Anu and Raj get engaged after one date and start planning a wedding. Later after Raj starts questioning if he can trust her, they break it off due to Raj admitting doubts about their arranged marriage. The two later actually start dating for real of their own accord after admitting they have feelings and want to start at the beginning. They plan to get married for real, but while in London at a conference, she receives an offer of her dream job to run a hotel there. She asks Raj to move there with her, but Howard helps Raj realize there's girls out there who like him for him and won't have to settle for.

==== Arthur Jeffries ====
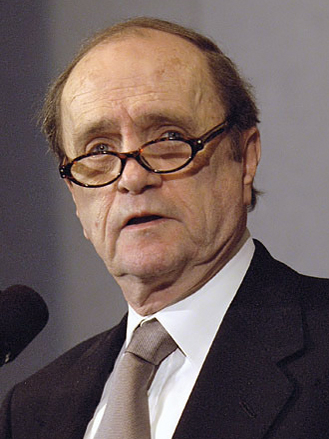
Bob Newhart

Arthur Jeffries, or Professor Proton (Bob Newhart), is the star of a fictional in-universe science show that Sheldon and Leonard watched as children. The character is a homage to Mr. Wizard. After the show was canceled, Jeffries was not taken seriously as a scientist and resorted to doing children's parties as his persona. When Sheldon asks for his wisdom, Jeffries tells Sheldon to appreciate everything in life, including his friends, and never take it for granted. After dying, Jeffries appears periodically in Sheldon's dreams, as a Jedi ghost akin to Obi-Wan Kenobi. He provides Sheldon with advice, such as comforting him over taking his relationship further with Amy, his misgivings over Wil Wheaton being cast in a Professor Proton reboot, and his first argument with Amy, now his wife. For his role as Jeffries, in 2013, Newhart won his first Primetime Emmy Award. Newhart played the same character on Young Sheldon. Both in Sheldon's dreams and his old age Jeffries is sarcastic and pessimistic, although gradually becomes friendlier in his dream appearances.

==== Beverly Hofstadter ====
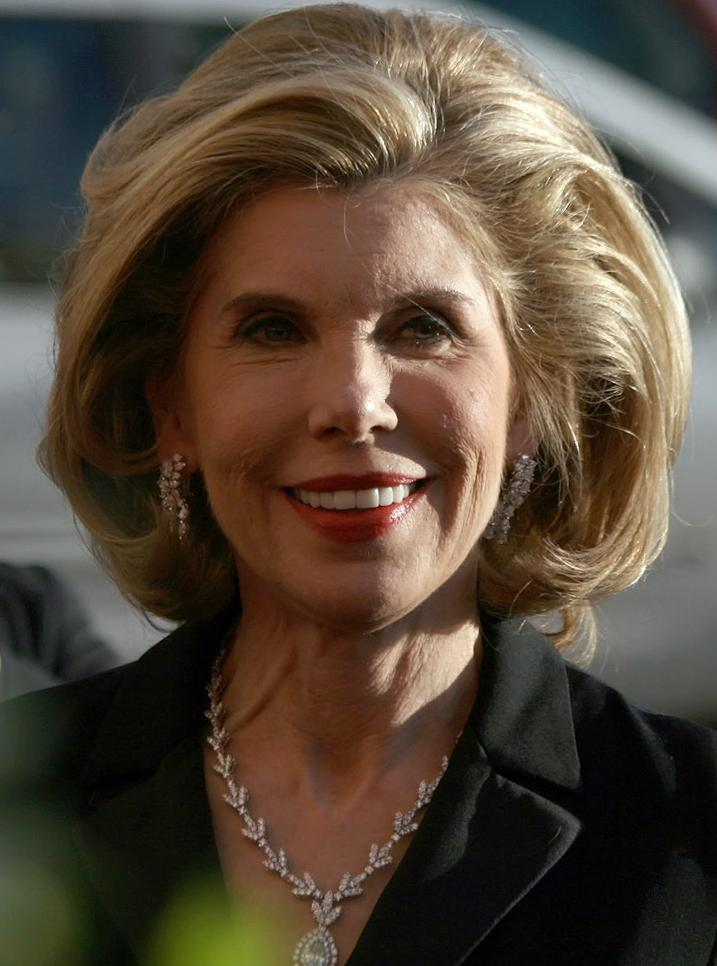
Christine Baranski

Beverly Hofstadter (Christine Baranski) is Leonard's emotionally distant and overly analytical mother who works as a neuroscientist and a psychiatrist. Like Sheldon, she has rigid speech patterns, a disregard for social conventions, and compulsive attention to detail. Her lack of maternal feelings and actions toward Leonard has turned him into a people pleaser. Mrs. Hofstadter and Mrs. Cooper do not get along. She first appears in Season 2 ("The Maternal Capacitance"), visiting her son. For her role as Beverly, in both 2009 and 2010, Baranski was nominated for an Emmy Award for Outstanding Guest Actress in a Comedy Series.

==== Claire ====
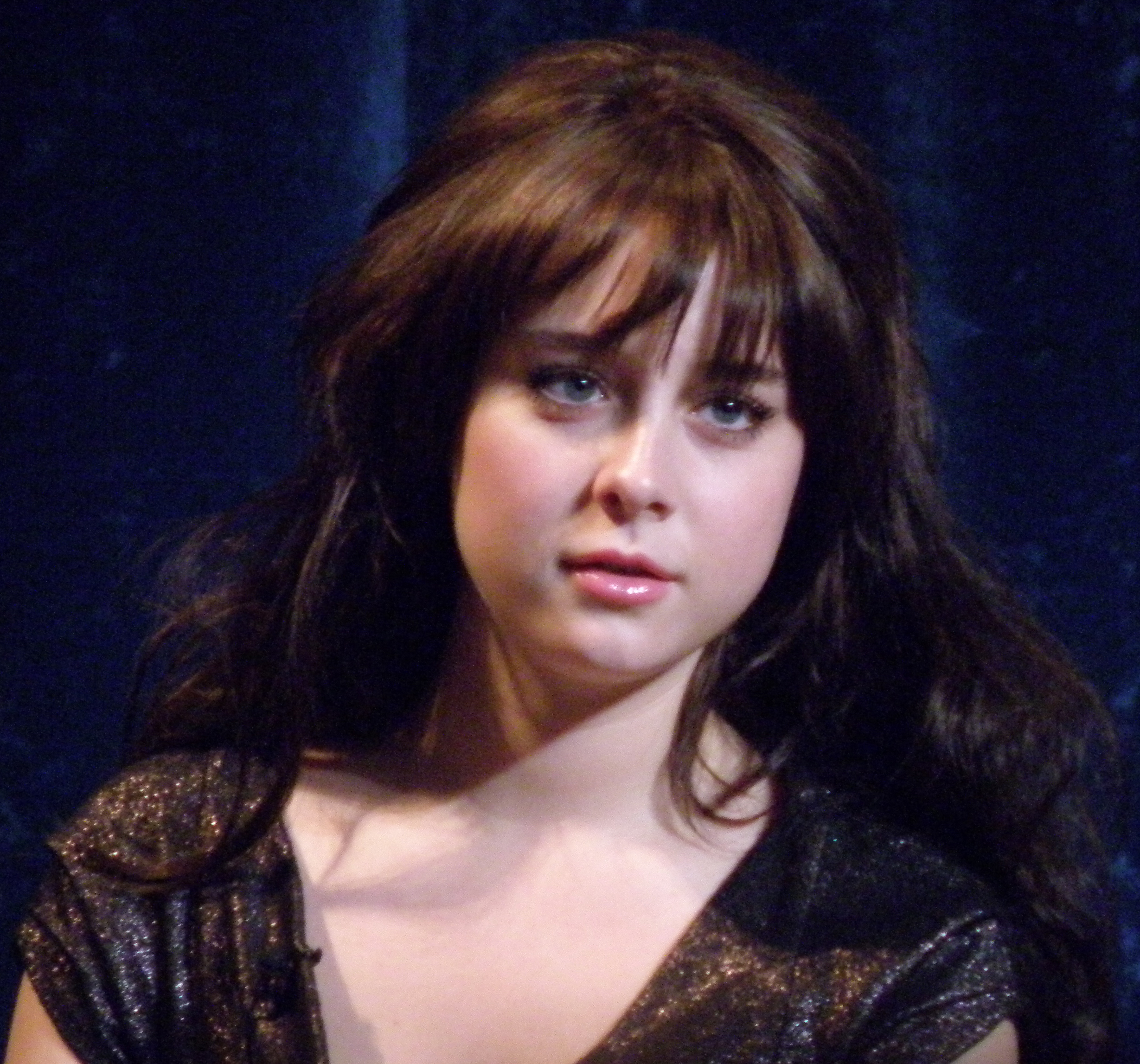
Alessandra Torresani

Claire (Alessandra Torresani) is a writer for a children's science fiction series whom Raj and Howard meet in the comic book store in season 9. Claire wants to collaborate with Raj on the science portions of a movie script. Raj immediately develops feelings for her, while still dating Emily, leading to complications.

==== Chen ====
Chen (James Hong) is an elderly waiter at the Szechuan Palace in Season 1 until it was revealed to be shut down the following season. He is not too fond of Sheldon after he accuses the restaurant of passing off Orange chicken as Tangerine and refers to Howard as the guy who thinks he can speak Chinese.

==== Dan ====
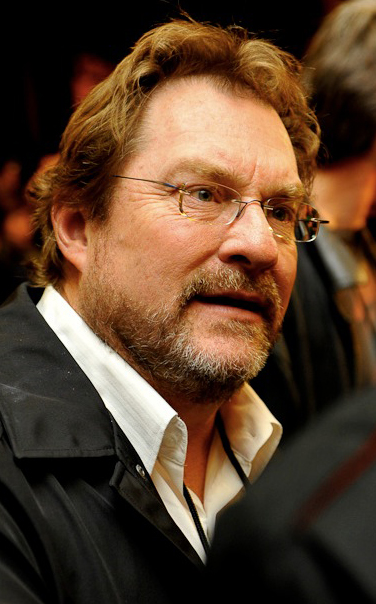
Stephen Root

Dan (Stephen Root) is a senior member of staff at Zangen, who first appears in "The Locomotion Interruption" when he interviews Penny for a pharmaceutical sales representative position as a favor to Bernadette, and later bonds with her, upon learning that they are both terrified of Bernadette.

==== Dave Gibbs ====
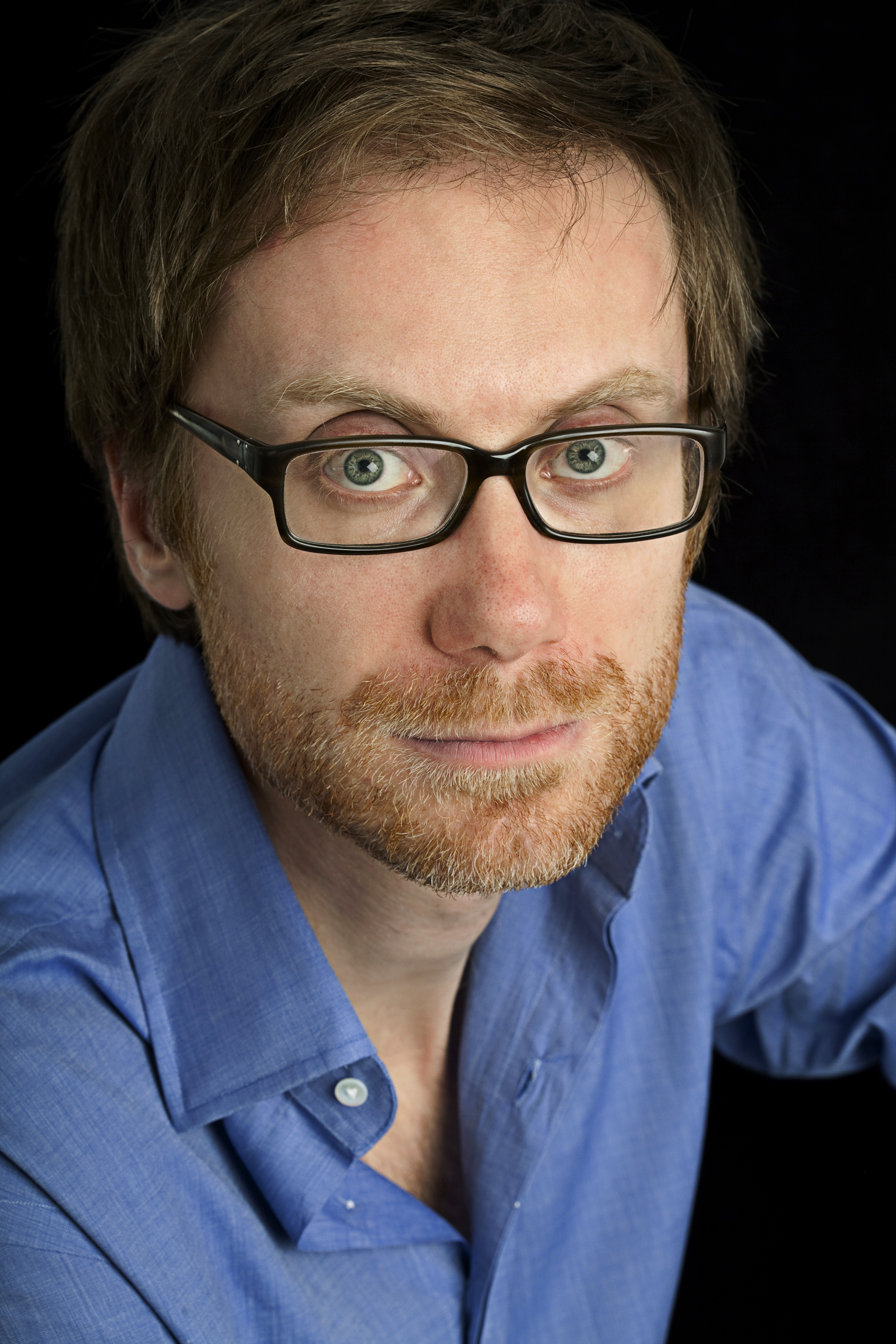
Stephen Merchant

Dave Gibbs (Stephen Merchant) is a tall British man who dates Amy after she breaks up with Sheldon. He recently divorced his wife after discovering her affair with a French chef. To Amy's horror, he is an avid fan of Sheldon's work. He constantly asks questions about Sheldon after learning that he and Amy dated. Gibbs has Merchant's native Bristol accent, considered "sexy" by Penny, Amy and Bernadette.

==== Dr. Eric Gablehauser ====
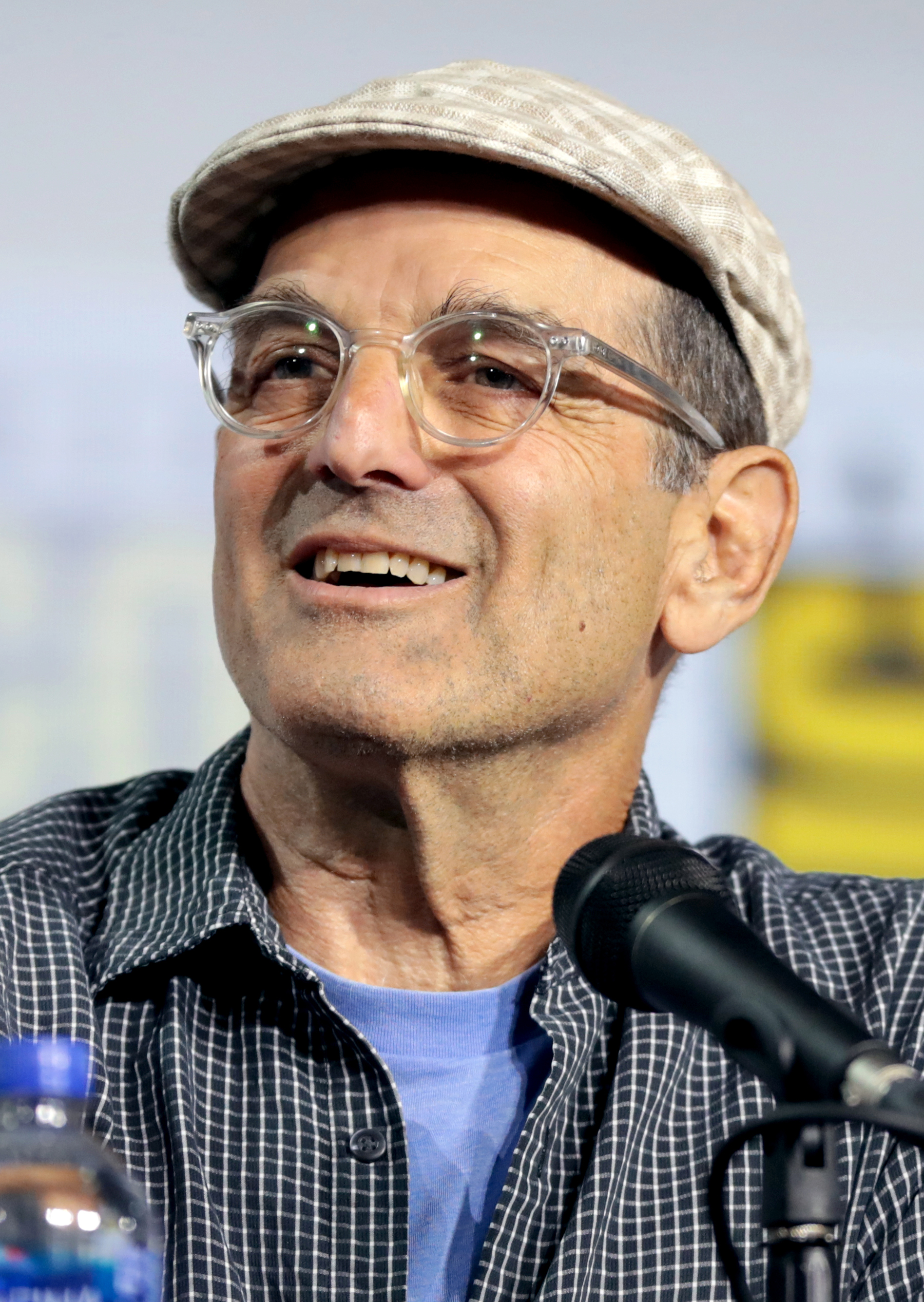
Mark Harelik

Dr. Eric Gablehauser (Mark Harelik) is the head of the Department of Physics, making him the boss of the main characters. Gablehauser later hosts the Physics Bowl, and gives Raj attention when he is featured in a People article for discovering a planet. Dr. Gablehauser is well acquainted with Dr. Cooper, Dr. Hofstadter, Dr. Koothrappali and Mr. Wolowitz.

==== Dr. Greg Pemberton ====
Dr. Greg Pemberton (Sean Astin) is part of a team of physicists at Fermilab who accidentally confirmed the Super-Asymmetry paper published by Sheldon and Amy. He and Kevin Campbell plan on nominating themselves and Sheldon for the Nobel Prize, but Sheldon refuses.

==== Dr. V. M. Koothrappali ====
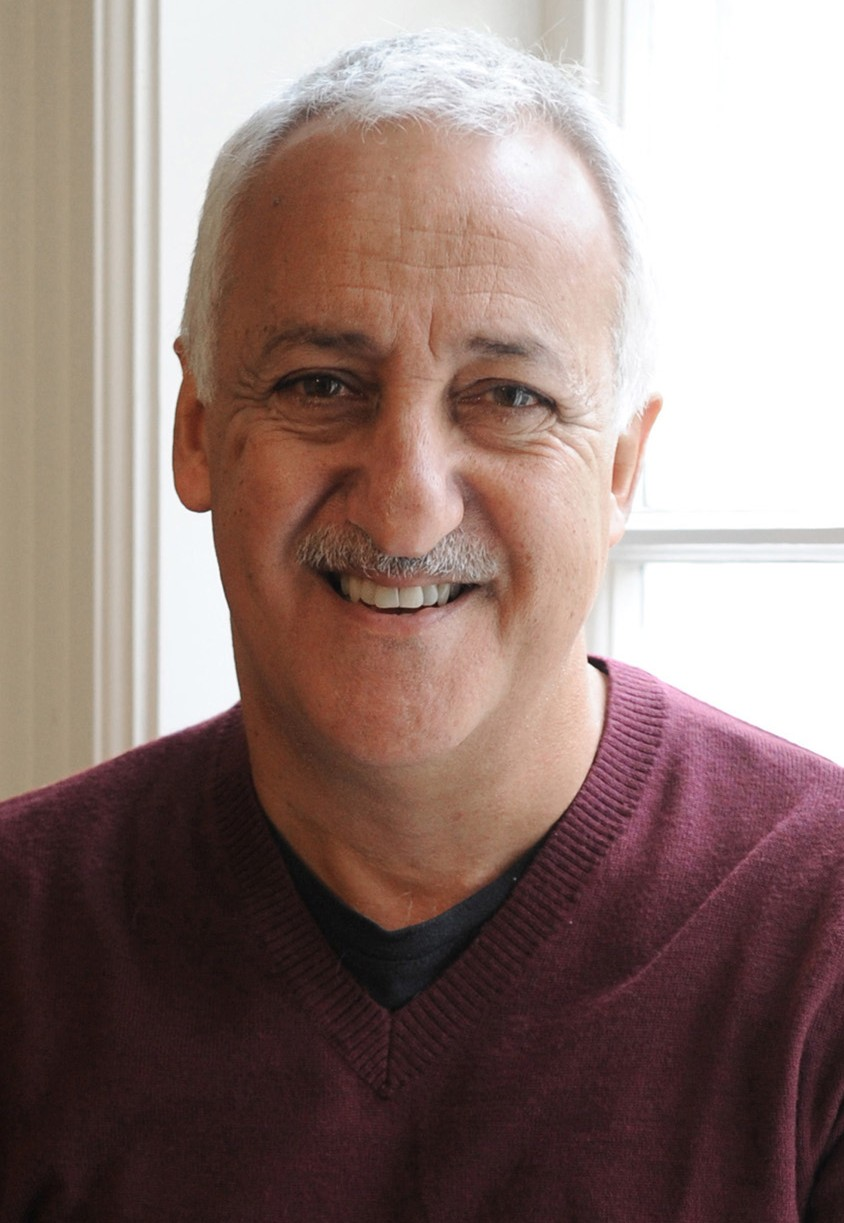
Brian George

Doctor V. M. Koothrappali (Brian George) is Raj's father in India. He is a gynecologist and a wealthy man. His wife and he communicate with their son via Skype and constantly try to arrange dates for him. They want their son to marry a woman of Indian descent and give them grandchildren. V. M. and his wife later divorce, devastating Raj.

==== Dr. Kevin Campbell ====
Dr. Kevin Campbell (Kal Penn) is one of the physicists at Fermilab who accidentally confirmed the Super-Asymmetry paper published by Sheldon and Amy. He and Greg Pemberton plan on nominating themselves and Sheldon for the Nobel Prize, but Sheldon refuses.

==== Mrs. Fowler ====
Mrs. Fowler (Annie O'Donnell) (season 5); Kathy Bates (Seasons 11 and 12) is the mother of Amy Fowler. She is the dominant figure of the household.

==== Mrs. Koothrappali ====
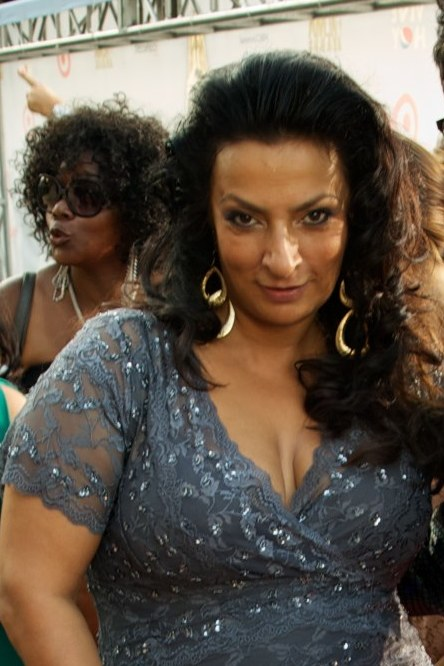
Alice Amter

Mrs. Koothrappali (Alice Amter) is Raj's mother in India. Mrs. Koothrappali is especially worried that, despite Raj being old enough to marry, the closest they have to a daughter-in-law is "that little Jewish boy Howard". Mrs. Koothrappali later divorces her husband, devastating Raj.

==== Janine Davis ====
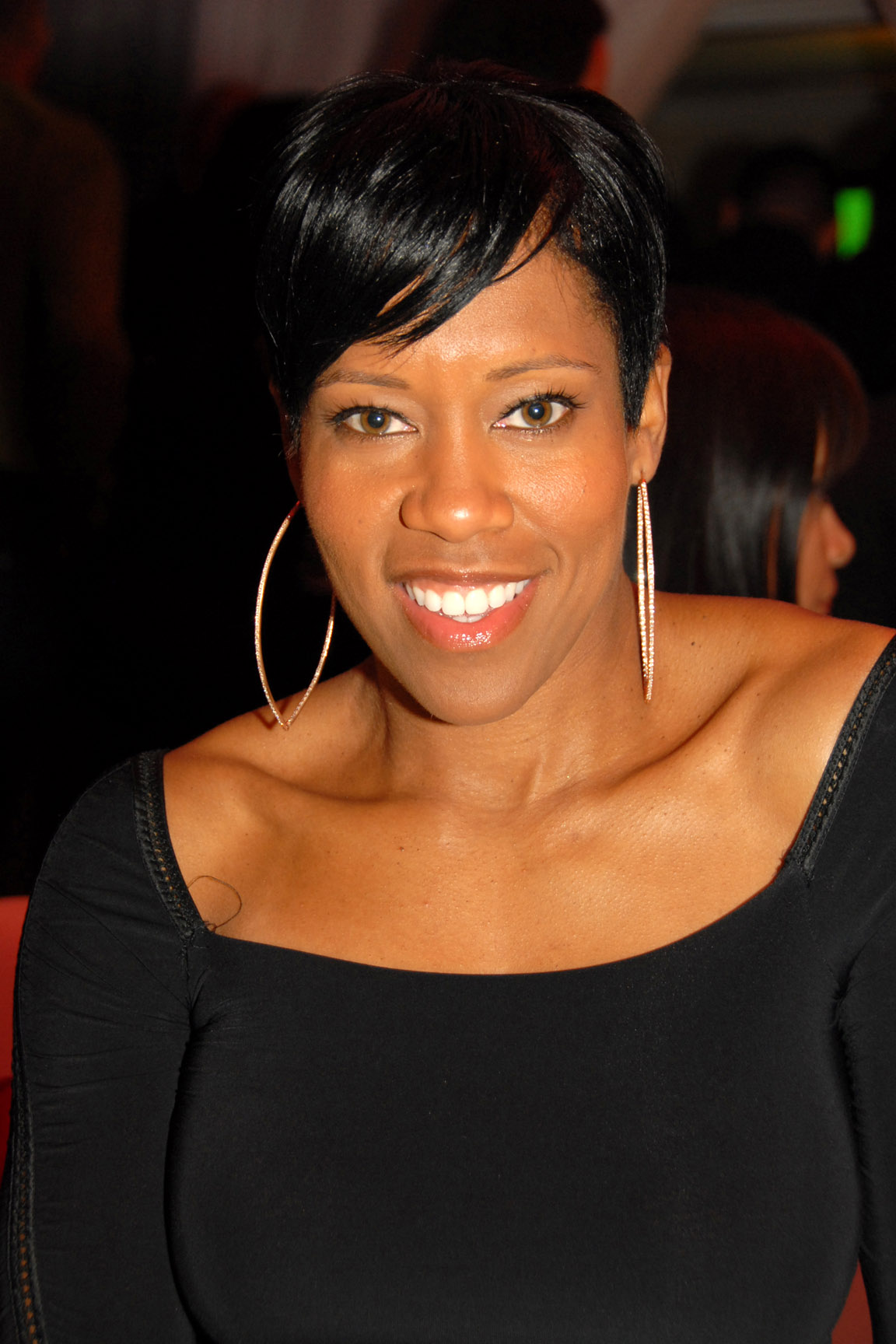
Regina King

Janine Davis (Regina King) is a human-resources representative working at the university. She first appears in Season 6 after Sheldon offends his assistant Alex while trying to deal with her crush on Leonard, leaving Mrs. Davis to handle Alex's sexual harassment complaint against Sheldon.

==== Kurt ====
Kurt (Brian Patrick Wade) is a tall, intimidating bodybuilder and Penny's ex-boyfriend at the beginning of the series. He physically belittles both Leonard and Sheldon when they go to collect Penny's things.

==== Larry Fowler ====
Larry Fowler (Teller) is the mild-mannered and silent father of Amy Fowler. He is terrified of his wife, and seldom speaks in his appearances. But he says "Thank you!" after his wife is reprimanded by Penny during Sheldon and Amy's wedding. Larry is fascinated by Howard's magic tricks.

==== Lucy ====
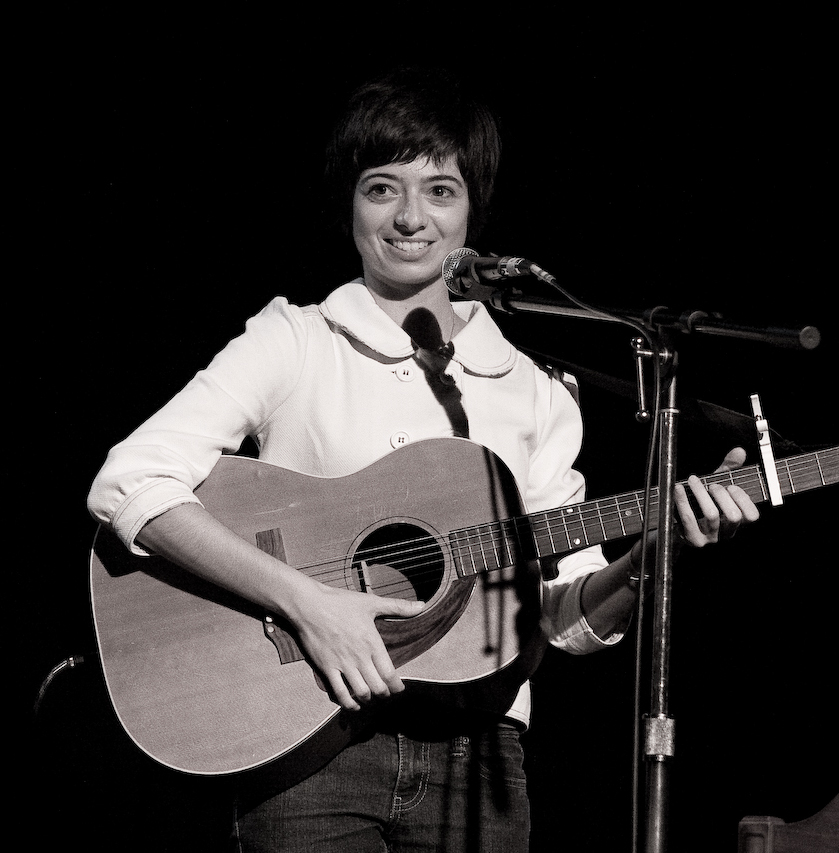
Kate Micucci

Lucy (Kate Micucci) shows up at a party at the comic-book store on Valentine's Day at an event for people with no dates. She has social anxiety issues, something she shares in common with Raj. Originally, Kate Micucci had been one of the actresses considered to play Amy Farrah Fowler.

==== Mike Rostenkowski ====
Mike Rostenkowski (Casey Sander) is Bernadette's father and a retired police officer. He is rude and often bullies others, but he loves his daughter. Before he is first seen, Bernadette establishes his personality by telling Howard a long list of subjects he cannot discuss with Mike, including Jimmy Carter, foreigners, homosexuals, and even Howard's Jewish identity. When an earlier opportunity opens for Howard to travel to space, he supports Howard, though the two later struggle to get along. In contrast, Mike gets on very well with Sheldon, filling a role in his life vacated by the latter's deceased father, George.

==== President Siebert ====
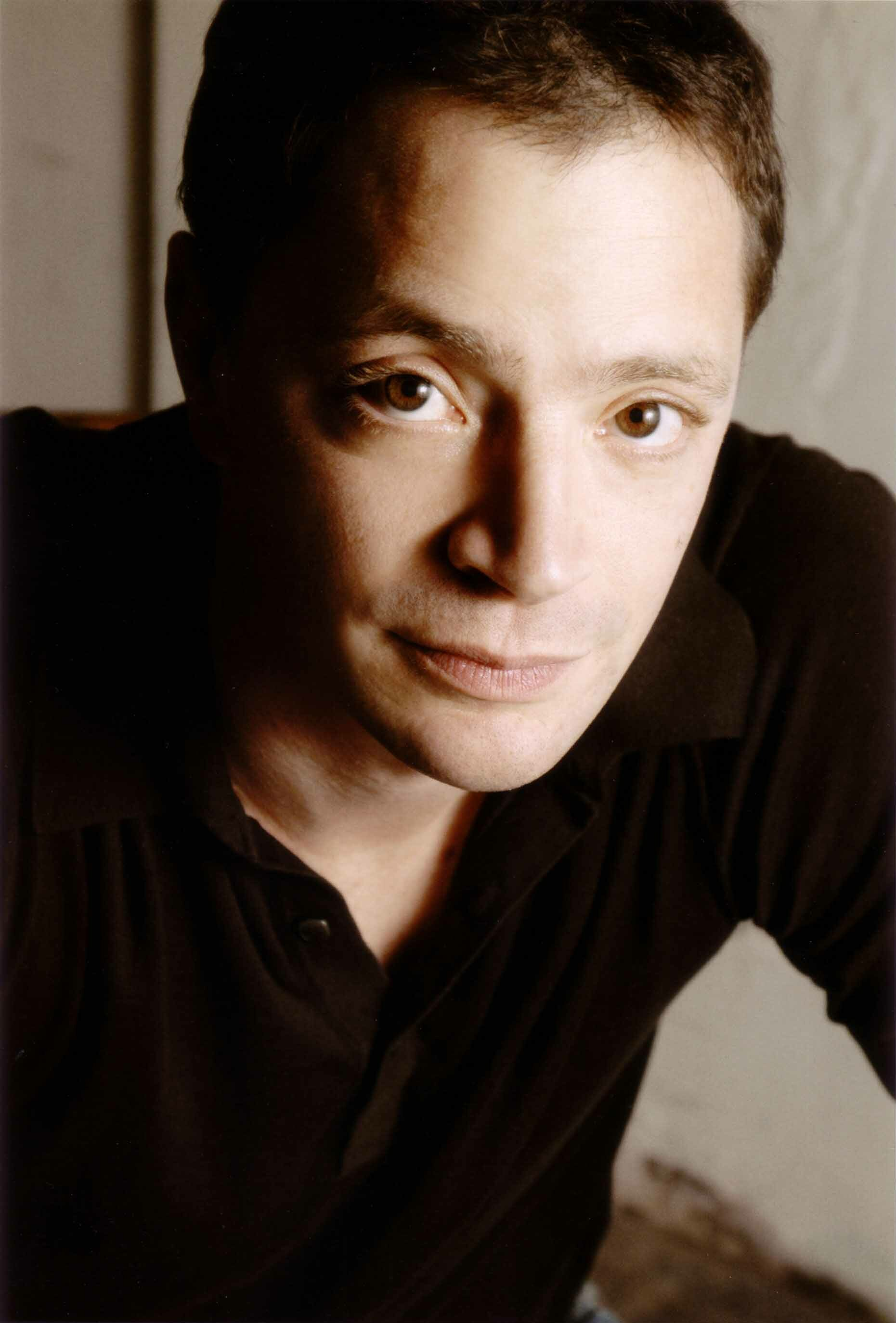
Joshua Malina

President Siebert (Joshua Malina) is the president of the California Institute of Technology. He invites the male main characters to a social gathering with the university's donors. He later endorses Sheldon and Amy when they are nominated for a Nobel Prize in Physics. He approves of the term quirky in order to describe them to the press.

==== Priya Koothrappali ====
Priya Koothrappali (Aarti Mann) is Raj's younger sister. Having graduated at the top of her class at the University of Cambridge, where, like Sheldon, she had a roommate from Texas. She is one of the lead attorneys at India's biggest car company. Leonard and Priya date for much of season 4 and part of 5 when she moves to Los Angeles.

==== Ramona Nowitzki ====
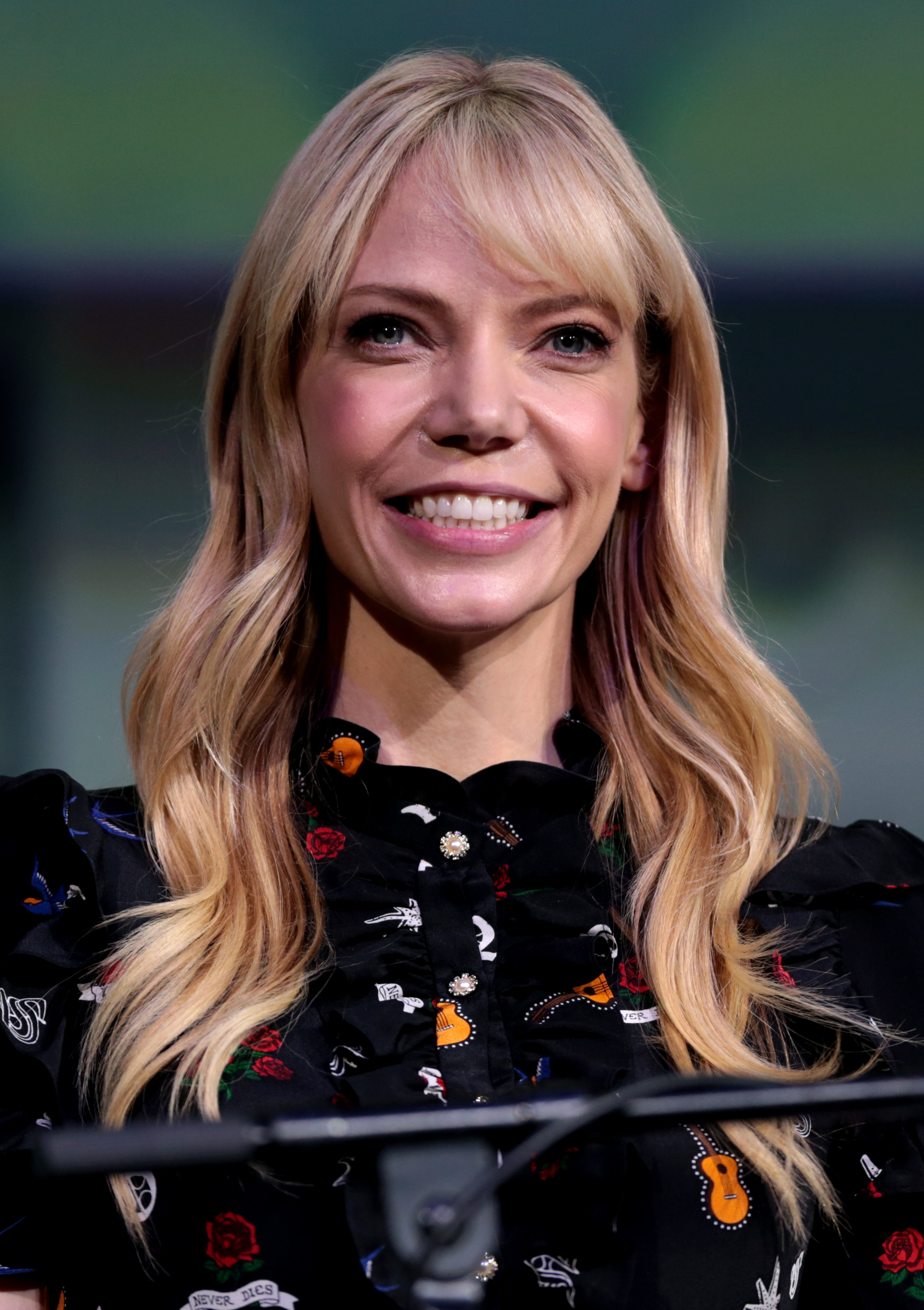
Riki Lindhome

Ramona Nowitzki, Ph.D. (Riki Lindhome) first appears in the season 2 episode "The Cooper–Nowitzki Theorem" as a graduate student at Caltech. She is a huge fan of Sheldon's work and develops a crush on him. Sheldon unsuccessfully tries to get rid of her until she wants to share credit on a breakthrough, whereupon he demands her departure. In season 10, she returns to Caltech and attempts to initiate a romantic relationship with Sheldon, knowing Amy is away at Princeton. He is oblivious to her advances until she kisses him, causing him to immediately fly to Princeton and propose to Amy. At the end of the first episode of season 11, Amy comes home and, to everyone's surprise, hugs and thanks Ramona.

==== Colonel Richard Williams ====
Colonel Williams (Dean Norris) is a United States Air Force Officer and engineer who first appears in season 10. A blunt military official, Williams is interested in a quantum gyroscope navigation and guidance system that he hires Howard, Leonard and Sheldon to develop for the U.S. Air Force. After Sheldon brashly promises a four-month deadline that they cannot meet, the Colonel easily grants them a two-year extension, noting that the military is used to delayed government contractors. However, once they finish the prototype, he notices Sheldon's theory for an even smaller version and forces them to build it against their will, only to suddenly confiscate all of their equipment and research without explanation. He later returns to reveal that Sheldon went behind his friends' backs to work with him on a new military communication system based on their original project.

In Stuart Fails to Save the Universe, an alternate version of Williams appears in a universe in which society is in a perpetual war, and he serves as a leader of an army that Stuart, Denise, Bert and Kripke are forced into joining.

==== Ruchi ====
Ruchi (Swati Kapila) is a colleague of Bernadette's at Zangen who first appears in season 11. Both Stuart and Raj pursue a relationship with her. When Raj tricks Stuart and tries to hang out with her alone, she expresses only wanting to find friends at the moment when Stuart arrives at the bar and tells her what Raj did. After apologizing, Stuart expresses interest in just being friends with Ruchi. When she leaves, he then states that his plan is working to get close to her.

==== Stephanie Barnett ====
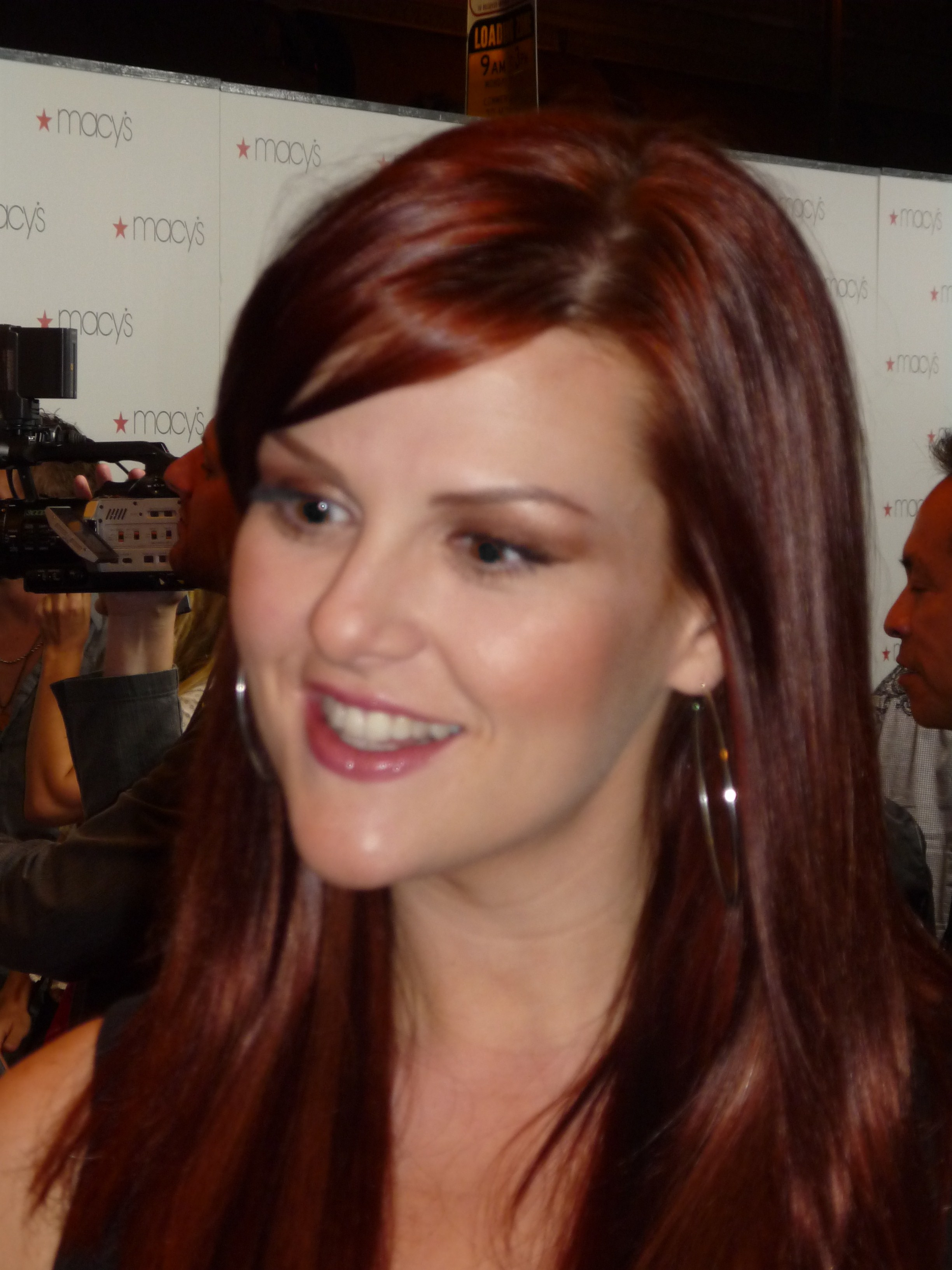
Sara Rue

Stephanie Barnett, MD (Sara Rue) is a doctor and highly distinguished surgical resident at Fremont Memorial. She did her medical internship at Lawrence Memorial in Galveston, Texas, where Sheldon was born. She was originally a romantic interest of Howard but later pursues Leonard, much to the dismay of Howard. Leonard is worried they are moving too fast, but is also afraid of what might happen if he asks to slow things down. At the advice of his friends, he asks her over text, and she agrees. Series co-creator Bill Prady described her role as "a chance for Leonard to learn that just because someone loves you, doesn't mean you'll love them back."

==== Wil Wheaton ====
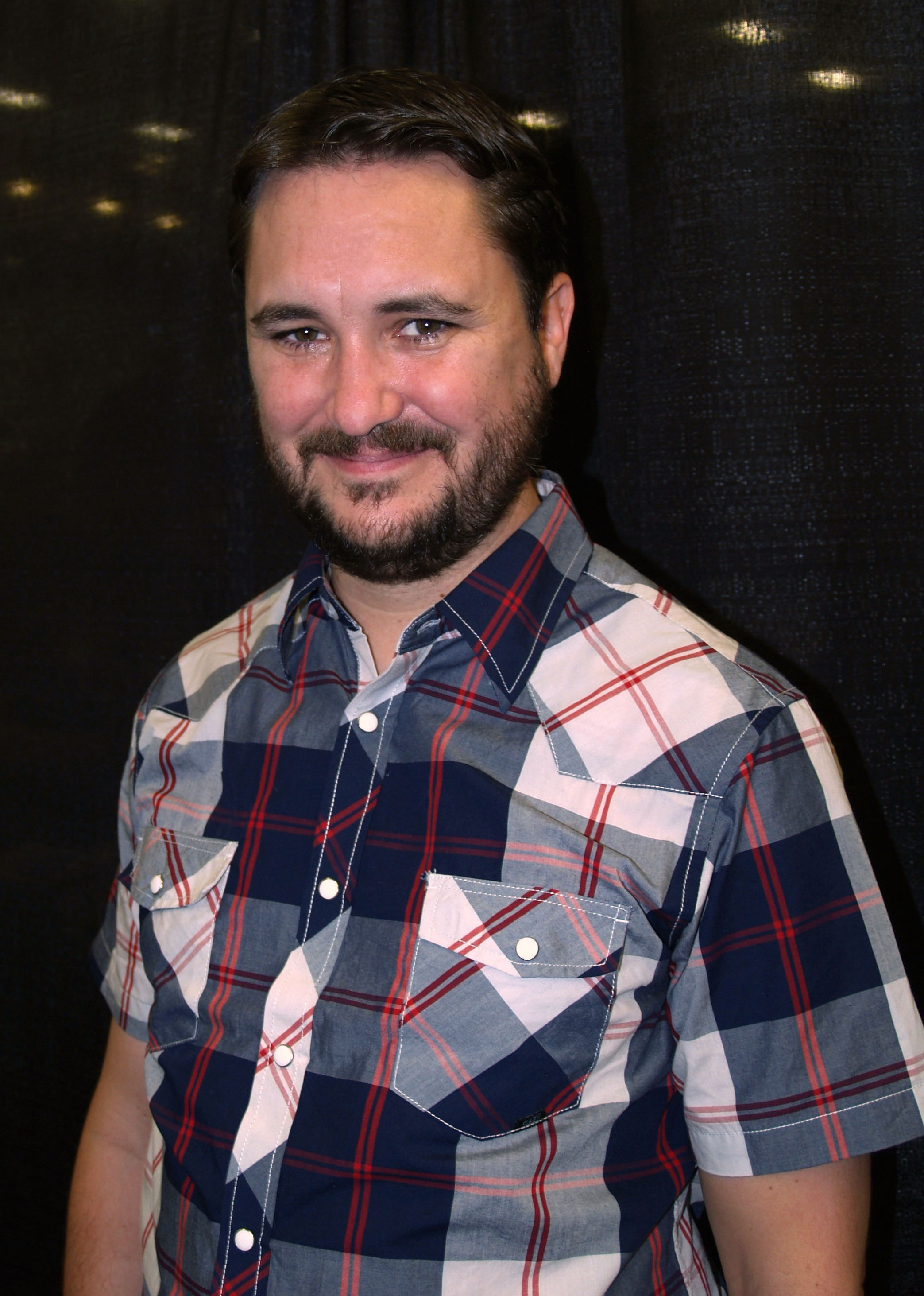
Wil Wheaton, who plays a fictionalized version of himself

Wil Wheaton plays a fictionalized version of himself, who played Wesley Crusher in Star Trek: The Next Generation, a character that Sheldon idolized as a child. Wil Wheaton, LeVar Burton, Leonard Nimoy (in voice-over only), Brent Spiner, William Shatner and George Takei have all appeared on the show, making the Star Trek franchise the most represented franchise on the show in terms of guest appearances. He is first introduced as a nemesis to Sheldon since childhood for skipping out on a signing Sheldon was attending. He then later mends things with Sheldon after apologizing and giving him an autographed action figure of his character Wesley. He then appears numerous times later in different situations interacting with each of the gang on occasion.

==== Marissa Johnson ====
Marissa Johnson (Lindsey Kraft) is married to Penny's ex-boyfriend, Zack Johnson.

==== Mrs. Wolowitz ====
Mrs. Debbie Melvina Wolowitz (voiced by Carol Ann Susi) is Howard's over-protective, controlling, belittling, but loving and caring stereotypical Jewish mother. The character is not shown on-screen with only two exceptions: secondly in one episode in season six where her body but not her face is briefly shown, and firstly in the Season 5 finale where she can be seen, albeit barely, in the Google Earth satellite picture taken during Howard and Bernadette's wedding. Mrs. Wolowitz's raspy voice is heard usually in scenes at her house, where Howard also lives. She always talks to Howard by yelling at him from another room, which results in awkward conversations with Howard having to respond by yelling back at her. She seems to be oblivious to Howard's work as an engineer and treats him as though he is still a child. She is a master at Wheel of Fortune and guessing answers at game shows. She frequently refers to Leonard, Sheldon, and Raj as Howard's "little friends" (as in, "I made some cookies and Hawaiian Punch for you and your little friends!") and often refers to Caltech as a "school". She puts on a brave face for Howard, but she does open up to Sheldon while dress shopping that she is lonely and upset over her current weight. Due to the death of her actress, Mrs. Wolowitz character is retired with the fact that she died in her sleep while visiting family. Her death hit her son hard, though he is comforted by his friends. It is later revealed the gang was devastated too and paid tribute to her while reminiscing about what they loved about her around the table while eating. Her voice is heard in later episodes in flashbacks, using voice clips already recorded.

==== Wyatt ====
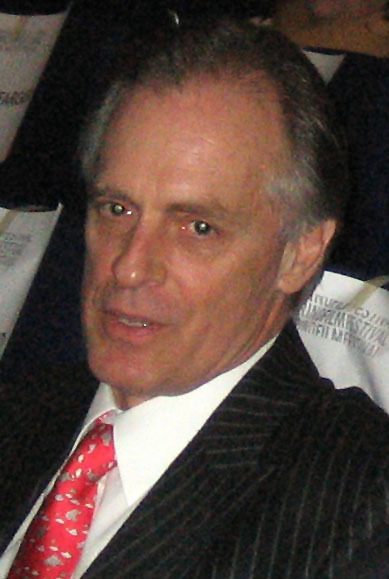
Keith Carradine

Wyatt (Keith Carradine) is Penny's father. He approves of Leonard as his daughter's boyfriend. Wyatt later attends Penny's wedding, and two years later, agrees to stand in her corner when she chooses to not have children. The first mention of Penny's father was in "The Maternal Capacitance", where she called him 'Bob'; however, his name was later changed to 'Wyatt'.

==== Zack Johnson ====
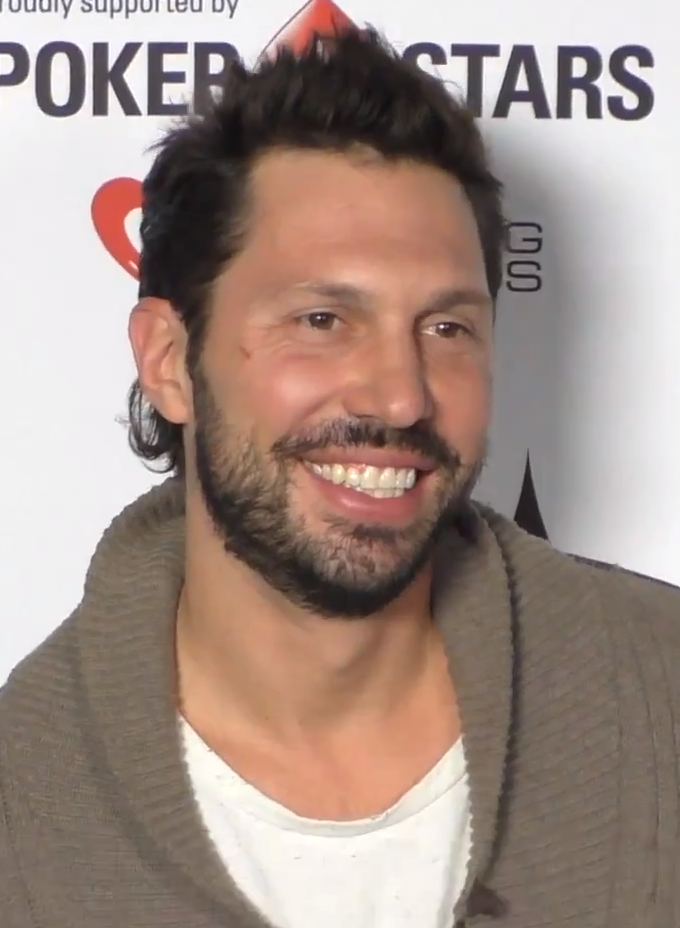
Brian Thomas Smith

Zack Johnson (Brian Thomas Smith) is a dim-witted but friendly beefcake type whom Penny dates on and off after her second break-up with Leonard. Unlike Penny's other boyfriends, who treat her friends with contempt, Zack takes an interest in science, despite being scientifically illiterate. He also bonds with the main male characters over comic books and dresses as Superman for a group costume as the Justice League. However, Penny later states that Zack "did not challenge her intellectually" to the surprise of others. He later reveals that he has sold his menu company and become rich from the profits, and invites her and Leonard to dinner at his yacht with him and his new wife, Marissa Johnson.

=== Young Sheldon ===
==== Brenda Sparks ====
Brenda Sparks (Melissa Peterman) is Billy Sparks's mother who works at the bowling alley frequented by Meemaw. She frequently clashes with Mary due to her religious status. However they eventually become friends and help each other out with their kids.

==== Dale Ballard ====
Coach Dale Ballard (Craig T. Nelson) is the owner of a sporting goods store and a part-time baseball coach who lets Missy play after he declined but Meemaw intervened. He also ends up dating Meemaw after her breakup with Dr. Sturgis. Meemaw moves into his house after hers is destroyed in a tornado.

==== Dr. John Sturgis ====
Dr. John Sturgis (Wallace Shawn) is a physics professor at the university East Texas Tech, which Sheldon attends part-time. Dr. Sturgis is initially a pen pal of Sheldon Cooper before the child prodigy audits his course on quantum chromodynamics. Dr. Sturgis is instantly smitten with Sheldon's grandmother, and they begin dating. He also shows some childish behavior, such as going to bed at 7:30 and asking Meemaw's permission to do things as if she were his mother. They later split up after he went to a mental hospital but they remained friends.

==== Herschel Sparks ====
Herschel Sparks (Billy Gardell) is a neighbor of the Cooper family and Meemaw, the husband of Brenda Sparks, and the father of Billy and Bobbi Sparks. He runs his own garage, where he offers Georgie a part-time job. Georgie turns out to be a wonderful employee, something that makes George and Herschel happy and stunned. Herschel is often bossed around by his wife, something that he and George bond over since George is often bossed around by Mary as well. In the fourth season, he and Brenda get a divorce.

==== Paige Swanson ====
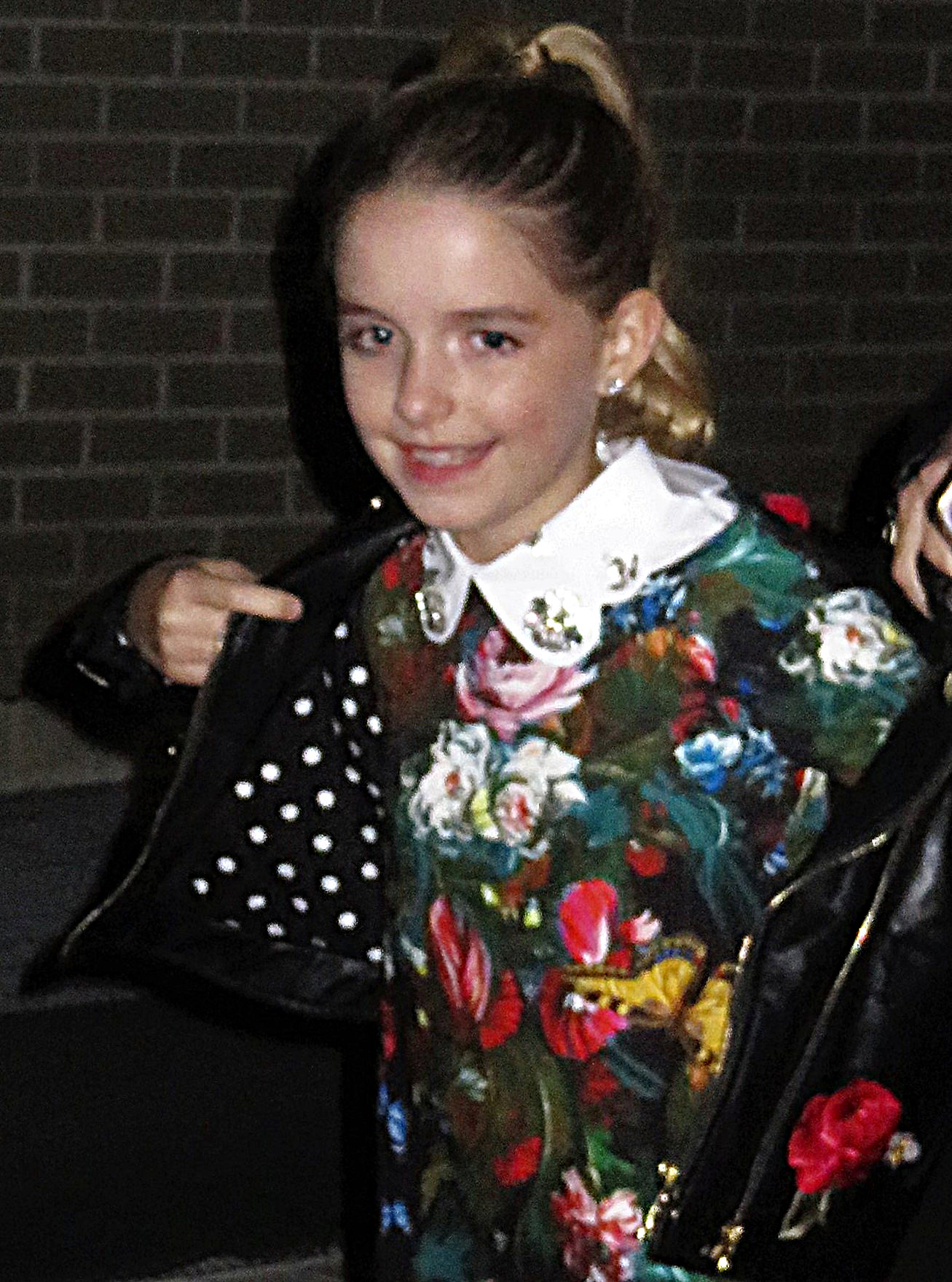
McKenna Grace

Paige Swanson (Mckenna Grace) is a 10-year-old child prodigy whom Sheldon meets in one of his classes with Dr. Sturgis. As his rival, she teases him for not knowing how to differentiate under the integral sign. She has higher social skills than Sheldon and is capable of being friends with nonintellectuals. She reacts negatively to her parents' divorce. Dr. Sturgis advises Sheldon to listen to her problems. He does, which results in Sheldon learning to listen. He attempts to console her by making her a hot beverage.

She makes several appearances in later seasons, showing an increasing rebellious streak due to her parents' divorce and her desire to be 'normal'. She runs away from home and starts drinking and dating older boys.

==== Robin ====
Robin (Mary Grill) is a police officer and Pastor Jeff's second wife. Pastor Jeff meets Robin in "A Broken Heart and a Crock Monster" when she stops him for passing a red light. She takes an interest in him and because of that, refuses to give him a ticket.

==== Tam Nguyen ====
Tam Nguyen (portrayed by Ryan Phuong in Young Sheldon and Robert Wu in The Big Bang Theory) is a Vietnamese-American Catholic boy who, in Young Sheldon, is Sheldon's classmate and only friend. His father Le Nguyen and mother Trang Nguyen run a store, Medford Mart. He has a troubled relationship with his parents, having been treated badly by both of them after moving to the United States. He has two sisters, Mai and Kim-Ly, with whom he has a good relationship. Tam laments his difficult childhood in war-torn Vietnam, which included his father being incarcerated in a re-education camp to "become a good communist", and his encounter with the Ku Klux Klan when he first arrived in America.

==== Veronica Duncan ====
Veronica Duncan (Isabel May) is Georgie Cooper's first love interest on Young Sheldon. Initially introduced as a popular and "easy" girl, Veronica becomes a devout Christian after going through a "Hell house" one Halloween. Georgie had a crush on her and frequently takes every advantage he can to be close to her or impress her in any way.

==== Constance "CeeCee" Cooper-McAllister ====
Constance "CeeCee" Cooper-McAllister (portrayed by twins Isabelle and Zariah Booko) is Georgie and Mandy's baby daughter in Young Sheldon and Georgie and Mandy's First Marriage, born in the episode "A Launch Party and a Whole Human Being". As of season 3 of Georgie and Mandy's First Marriage, she attends preschool.

== Minor characters ==
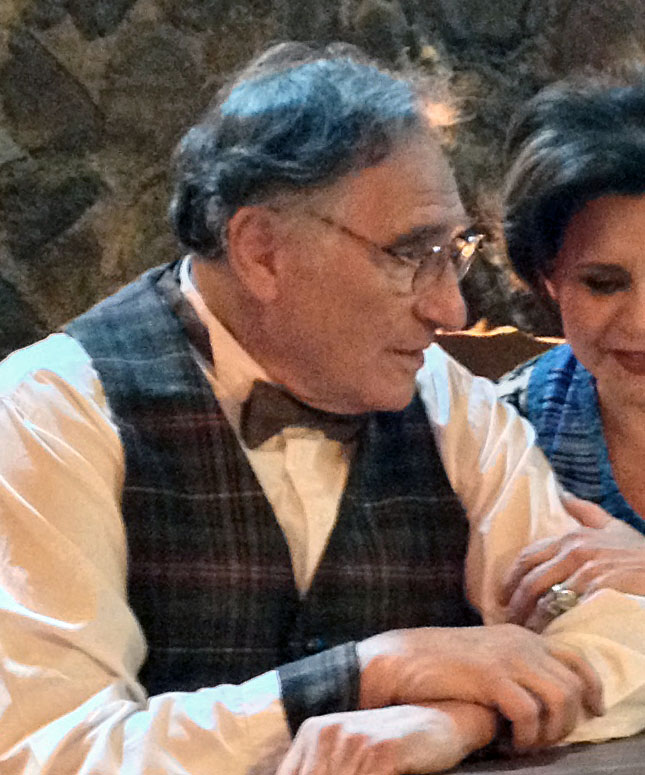
Judd Hirsch

==== Dr. Alfred Hofstadter ====
Leonard's father, an anthropologist who once worked with famed archaeologist Louis Leakey. (Leonard's middle name is Leakey in consequence.) He was miserable in his marriage to Leonard's mother Beverly. Alfred later attends his son's wedding to Penny, and takes an interest in Mary Cooper, Sheldon's mother. Played by Judd Hirsch.

==== Captain Sweatpants and Lonely Larry ====
Sometimes seen at the guys' favorite comic-book store. Captain Sweatpants is a middle-aged bald man who wears grey sweatpants and a T-shirt with the "Statesman Star" logo from defunct MMORPG City of Heroes. Lonely Larry wears a brown suit and is extremely thin. They are also friends with Wil Wheaton. Both attend Howard's bachelor party. Played by Ian Scott Rudolph and Owen Thayer.

==== Cheryl ====
An attendee at Penny's Halloween party in season one, episode six, "The Middle-Earth Paradigm". Cheryl is the very talkative, short-haired brunette dressed as a ladybug, who shows interest in Raj. She is not identified within the episode, but her name is listed in the credits. She appears again as a Cheesecake Factory waitress in "The Pancake Batter Anomaly". Played by Erin Allin O'Reilly.

==== Dale ====
A replacement for Stuart at the comic-book store when Stuart goes on a date with Amy in "The Flaming Spittoon Acquisition". Also appears in "The Tangible Affection Proof" at Stuart's Valentine's Day party. Played by Josh Brener, who also plays a different role as Trevor in Stuart Fails to Save the Universe.

==== Dimitri Rezinov ====
a Russian cosmonaut who is Howard's colleague on his Soyuz mission to the International Space Station. Played by Pasha Lychnikoff.

==== Dr. David Underhill ====
A MacArthur Grant recipient and a successful physicist in the episode "The Bath Item Gift Hypothesis". Played by Michael Trucco.

==== Jeanie ====
The second-cousin with whom Howard lost his virginity in a Toyota Corolla after his Uncle Murray Wolowitz's funeral. Jeanie is mentioned by Howard in The Creepy Candy Corollary and The Adhesive Duck Deficiency (both episodes in season 3) but appears for the first and only time in The Prom Equivalency (season 8) as Stuart's date. Played by Kara Luiz.

==== Halley Wolowitz ====
Howard and Bernadette's baby daughter, born in the episode "The Birthday Synchronicity". Played by Pamela Adlon, voice only. Later played by Sailah Nicol in live-action.

==== Neil Michael Wolowitz ====
Howard and Bernadette's baby son, born in the episode "The Neonatal Nomenclature". Played by Nate Ash.

== Guest stars ==
=== The Big Bang Theory ===
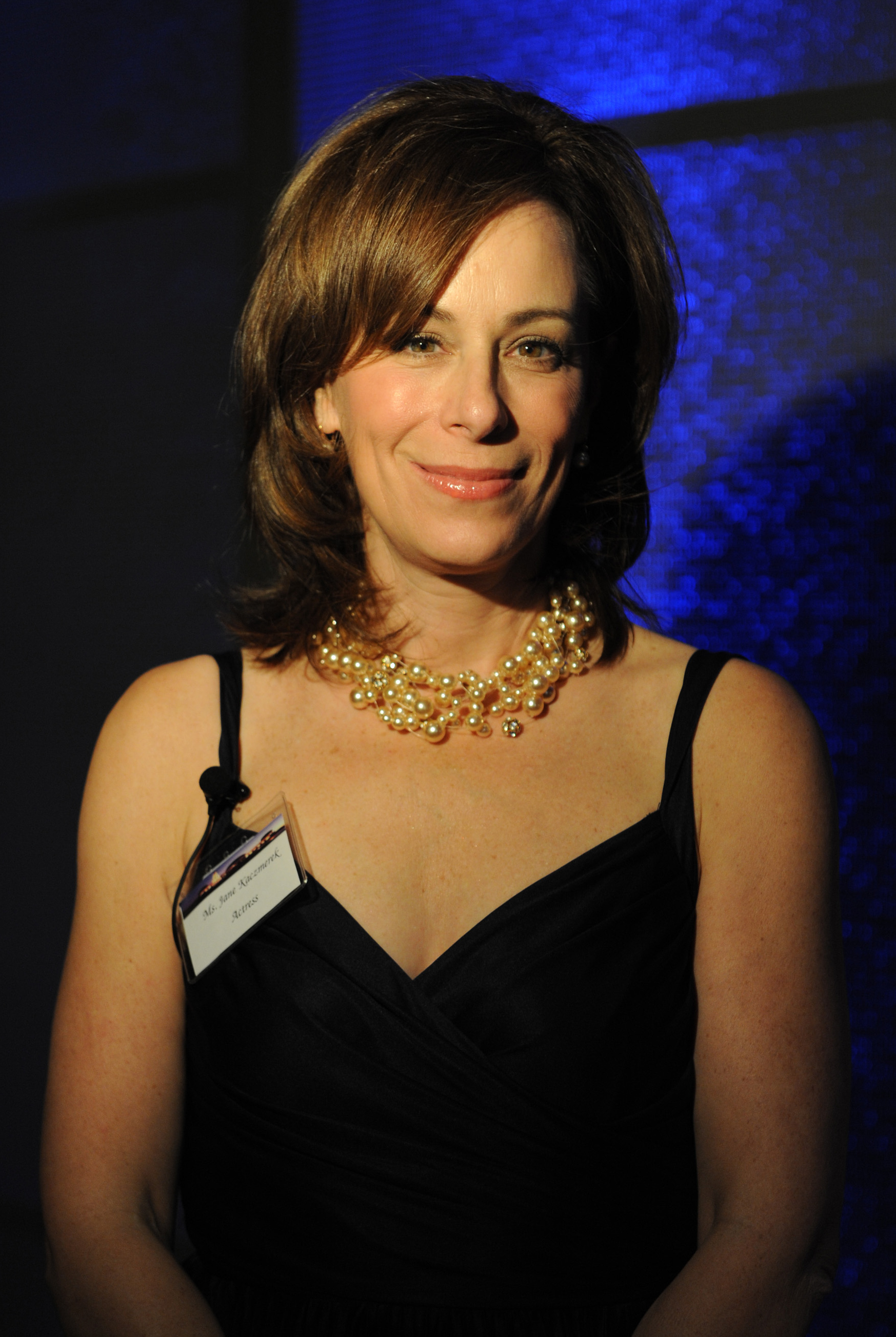
Jane Kaczmarek

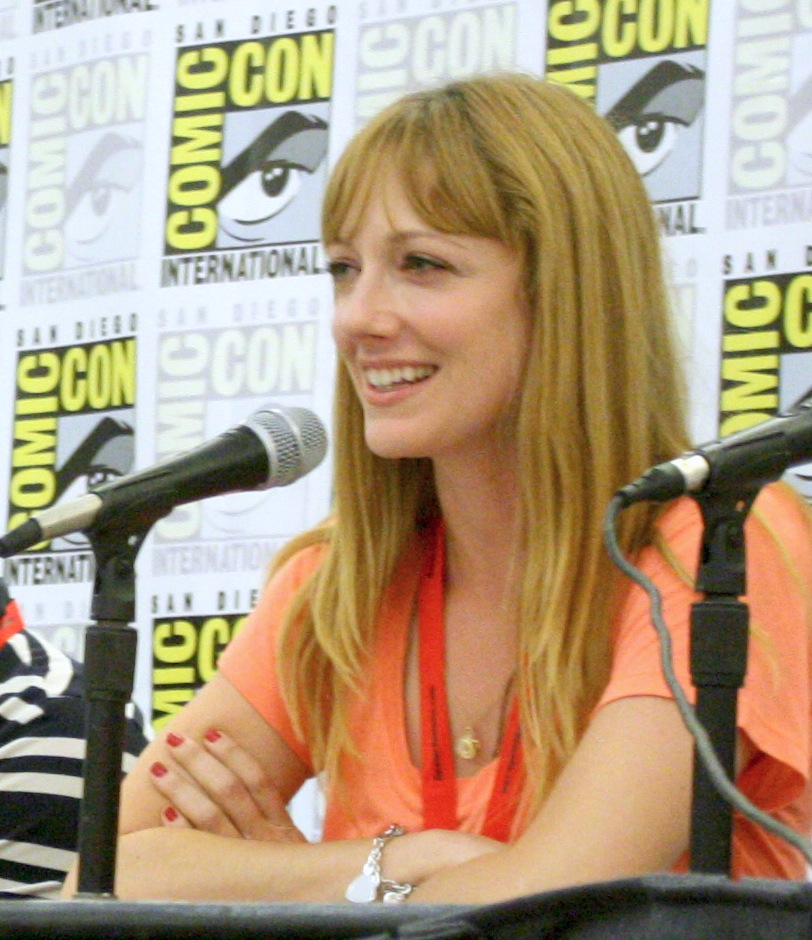
Judy Greer

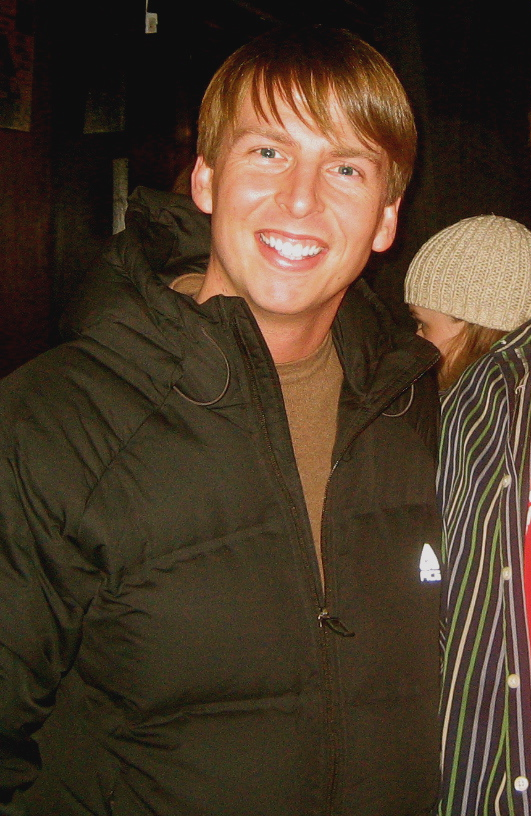
Jack McBrayer

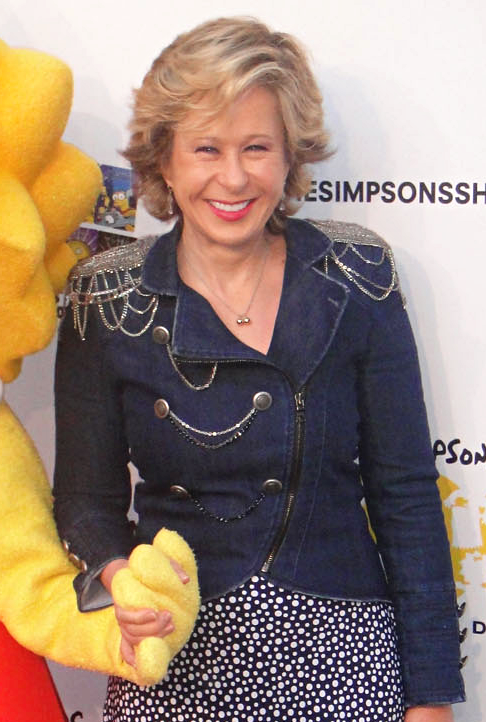
Yeardley Smith

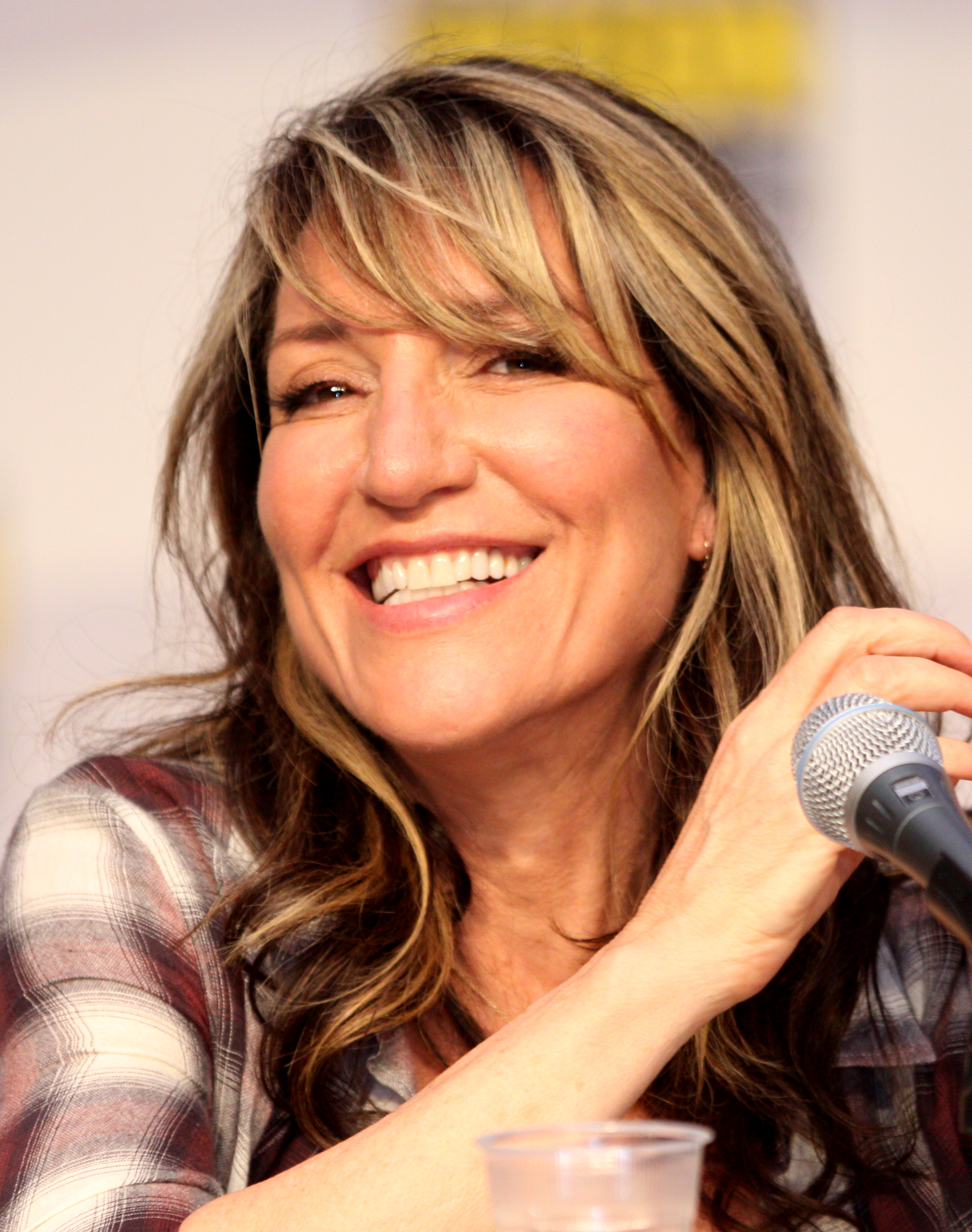
Katey Sagal

- Abby (Danica McKellar) and Martha (Jen Drohan), two women whom Raj and Sheldon meet at a university mixer. Abby takes a liking to Raj, and Martha takes a liking to Sheldon. While Raj is welcoming of Abby's moves, Sheldon rejects Martha.
- Alice (Courtney Ford), an attractive comic book enthusiast whom Leonard meets after Priya moves back to India. Meeting Alice triggers a chain of events which ends with Leonard and Priya splitting.
- Mandy Chao (Melissa Tang), a colleague of Leonard at the university who made out with him once when they were both drunk. The incident, which happened prior to Leonard's marriage to Penny, almost sabotages the marriage after Leonard tells Penny about it.
- Professor Crawley (Lewis Black), a former entomologist at the university with whom Sheldon, Howard, and Raj confer about a cricket; reveals he was given the nickname "Creepy Crawley"
- Issabella Maria Concepcion (Maria Canals-Barrera) a Cuban-American janitor working in Raj's telescope building whom Raj wants to date.
- Kenny Fitzgerald (Michael Rapaport), an intelligent thief who sells stolen liquid helium to Leonard and Sheldon. He later strikes up a friendship with the duo and they watch Ernest Goes to Jail together.
- Dr. Gallo (Jane Kaczmarek), a therapist to whom Penny attempts to sell products. She winds up conducting therapy on both Penny and Leonard.
- Jesse (Josh Peck), the owner of the comic book store Capitol Comics and Stuart's rival.
- Mrs. Latham (Jessica Walter), a donor for the university who goes on two dates with Leonard.
- Toby Loobenfield (DJ Qualls), a scientist at Caltech whom Sheldon hires to play his fictional drug-addicted cousin Leo
- Dr. Oliver Lorvis (Billy Bob Thornton), a medical doctor to whom Penny sells products. He misreads her flirtations and locks the guys in his basement while he goes to woo her (as well as Amy and Bernadette).
- Sunny Morrow (Ciara Renée), a newscaster who interviews Raj on the local news about an upcoming astronomical event.
- Octavia (Octavia Spencer), a DMV clerk with whom Sheldon interacts
- Agent Angela Page (Eliza Dushku), an FBI agent assigned to interview Howard's acquaintances to determine his eligibility to use the Defense Department Laser Equipped Surveillance Satellite team.
- Dr. Elizabeth Plimpton (Judy Greer), an acquaintance of Sheldon's, who upon visiting, engages in sexual roleplay with Leonard, Howard, and Raj simultaneously
- Randall (Jack McBrayer), Penny's brother who first appears in the season 10 premiere "The Conjugal Conjecture" when he attends his sister's re-wedding to Leonard. He has served several prison terms and had several other "troubles" over the years.
- Sandy (Yeardley Smith), interviewing clerk at a job center when Sheldon tries to find a menial part-time job to clear his head
- Jimmy Speckerman (Lance Barber), a former high school classmate of Leonard who used to bully Leonard during their high school days on a regular basis. He comes to visit with Leonard, not realizing that his actions in high school constituted bullying. In the prequel series, Young Sheldon, and in "The VCR Illumination", Barber plays Sheldon's father, George Cooper, Sr.
- Spock (Leonard Nimoy, voice only), appears in Sheldon's dream
- Susan (Katey Sagal), Penny's mother who first appears in the season 10 premiere "The Conjugal Conjecture" when she attends her daughter's re-wedding to Leonard. Sagal and Cuoco previously appeared in the main cast of 8 Simple Rules for Dating My Teenage Daughter where Sagal also played Cuoco's mother.
- Trevor (Blake Anderson), an individual with whom Sheldon has conflict when he cuts in front of them at the movie theater
- Josh Wolowitz (Matt Bennett), Howard's half brother.
- Theodore (Christopher Lloyd), An old man to whom Sheldon rents his room in "The Property Division Collision". However, the rental is apparently for one night only since he soon leaves and is never seen again.
- Sebastian (Steven Yeun), Sheldon's roommate before Leonard who was intolerant toward Sheldon's behavior in "The Staircase Implementation". He also warned Leonard to "Run away, dude". His intolerance of Sheldon becomes apparent when Leonard enters Sebastian's former room and sees the phrase "DIE SHELDON, DIE" written on the wall in red paint.

=== Young Sheldon ===
- Anjelika Washington as Libby, an eleventh grader who aspires to be a geologist and whom Sheldon and Tam befriend
- Mayim Bialik as Amy Farrah Fowler, Sheldon's future lover and wife. This role is reprised from The Big Bang Theory. She appears as part of the narration and is seen on the final episode as a hockey mom, 'Memoir'.
- Melanie Lynskey as Professor Dora Ericson, who teaches Sheldon philosophy in college
- Ming-Na Wen as Dr. Carol Lee, a cosmologist from UC Berkeley brought in to lead a project that Sheldon, Dr. Sturgis, and Dr. Linkletter are working on
- Taylor Spreitler as Sam, a member of Sheldon's project group. Sam is a vocal supporter of women's rights.

== Guest stars appearing as themselves ==
Various Hollywood celebrities and famous scientists and engineers have made appearances on the show as themselves. In most cases, the appearances are brief cameo appearances. These appearances are in contrast to Wil Wheaton who, as described above, plays a character on the show which is a fictionalized version of himself.

=== The Big Bang Theory ===
- Adam Nimoy: Appearing in "The Spock Resonance", Adam is the son of Leonard Nimoy, the actor of Spock. He records Sheldon for a documentary about his father, on a recommendation from Will Wheaton.
- Adam West: Appearing in "The Celebration Experimentation", as a former Batman actor, Leonard hires Adam to attend Sheldon's birthday party, after hearing a sad story about how his sister Missy told him that Batman would come to his party.
- Lio Tipton: Appearing in "The Panty Piñata Polarization", is a model that Howard and Raj meet at the house used in America's Top Model. (Note: Tipton also makes an appearance in the season 9 episode "The Mystery Date Observation" as a minor character named Vanessa Bennett who correctly solves Sheldon's challenge, but misses the deadline by 15 seconds.)
- Bill Gates: Appearing in "The Gates Excitation" he spends the day with Penny at her company. Leonard tracks him down and breaks down in tears in front of him.
- Bill Nye: First appearing in "The Proton Displacement", he meets Professor Proton, and in "The Conjugal Configuration" is intimidated by Neil deGrasse Tyson.
- Brent Spiner: Appearing in "The Russian Rocket Reaction", he attends Wil Wheaton's party, where he becomes Sheldon's mortal enemy after opening a signed, mint-condition, limited-edition Wesley Crusher action figure.
- Brian Greene: Appearing in "The Herb Garden Germination", he is a Columbia University string theorist known to the general public for popularizing physics with his books. Sheldon and Amy attend one of his book signings for The Hidden Reality, amusing them, as they find him hysterical.
- Buzz Aldrin: Appearing in "The Holographic Excitation", is a former NASA Astronaut who walked on the Moon during the 1969 Apollo 11 mission. He appears in a video watched by Howard, bragging about his career in space to children collecting Halloween candy.
- Carrie Fisher: Appearing in "The Convention Conundrum", James Earl Jones and Sheldon ring on her doorbell before running away.
- Charlie Sheen: Appearing in "The Griffin Equivalency", Raj talks to him briefly about appearing in People magazine.
- Ellen DeGeneres: First appearing in "The Geology Elevation", as Sheldon and Bert attend a live recording of her show, she then appears in "The Laureate Accumulation", interviewing Dr. Greg Pemberton and Dr. Campbell.
- Elon Musk: Appearing in "The Platonic Permutation", he volunteers at the same soup kitchen as Howard and gives him his contact information.
- Frances Arnold: Appearing in "The Laureate Accumulation", is a Nobel Laureate who attends the university reception for Amy and Sheldon.
- George Smoot: First appearing "The Terminator Decoupling", as the guys travel to see his conference in San Francisco, and then "The Laureate Accumulation", attending the university reception held for Amy and Sheldon.
- George Takei: Appearing in "The Hot Troll Deviation" he appears in Howard's daydream while contemplating his feelings for Bernadette.
- Howie Mandel: Appearing in "The Re-Entry Minimization", he gets off the same plane as Howard following his return from space.
- Ira Flatow: First appearing in "The Vengeance Formulation" as a voice only, is a science radio host, in "The Discovery Dissipation" he interviews Sheldon, and in "The Retraction Reaction" he interviews Leonard.
- James Earl Jones: Appearing in "The Convention Conundrum", when Sheldon cannot go to Comic-Con, he is sent on starting his own convention, and tracks down James Earl Jones to convince him to join, but ends up spending the evening with him, going on a Ferris wheel, singing karaoke, pranking Carrie Fisher, visiting a strip club and going to a sauna.
- Joe Manganiello: Appearing in "The D&D Vortex", he is a member of Wil Wheaton's Dungeons & Dragons group.
- Kareem Abdul-Jabbar: Appearing in "The D&D Vortex", he is a member of Wil Wheaton's Dungeons & Dragons group.
- Katee Sackhoff: First appearing in "The Vengeance Formulation", and then in "The Hot Troll Deviation", in both she appears in Howard's daydream while contemplating his feelings for Bernadette.
- Kevin Smith: First appearing in "The Fortification Implementation", he is interviewed by Wil Wheaton for his podcast, alongside Penny, and offers her an audition, and in "The D&D Vortex" he is a member of Wil Wheaton's Dungeons & Dragons group.
- Kip Thorne: Appearing in "The Laureate Accumulation", is a Nobel Laureate who attends the university reception for Amy and Sheldon.
- LeVar Burton: First appearing in "The Toast Derivation", he receives an invitation to hang out by Sheldon, after the group has moved to Raj's place, while in "The Habitation Configuration" and "The Champagne Reflection", he is a guest on Sheldon's web show, Fun with Flags.
- Mark Hamill: Appearing in "The Bow Tie Asymmetry", after his dog is found by Howard, Hamill officiates Sheldon and Amy's wedding, which brings him to tears.
- Mike Massimino: First appearing in "The Friendship Contraction", he nicknames Howard "Fruit Loops" for the space mission, and appears in "The Countdown Reflection", "The Decoupling Fluctuation", "The Re-Entry Minimization", as a fellow NASA Astronaut who bullies Howard. and offers Howard advice in "The Table Polarization" and "The First Pitch Insufficiency".
- Nathan Fillion: Appearing in "The Comic Book Store Regeneration", he attempts to prove to Leonard and Raj that he is not Fillion, but relents and allows them to take a photo with him.
- Neil Gaiman: Appearing in "The Comet Polarization", he provides a favorable review of Stuart's comic book store, providing it a much needed boost.
- Neil deGrasse Tyson: First appearing in "The Apology Insufficiency", Neil butts heads with Sheldon, due to his history with Pluto, and in "The Conjugal Configuration" enters a tweet feud with Raj.
- Samantha Potter: Appearing in "The Panty Piñata Polarization", she is a model that Howard and Raj meet at the house used in America's Top Model. (Note: Appearance is credited, but did not have a speaking role.)
- Sarah Michelle Gellar: Appearing in "The Stockholm Syndrome"; after sitting next to her on the plane, Raj invites her as his plus one to Sheldon and Amy's Nobel Prize acceptance ceremony.
- Stan Lee: Appearing in "The Excelsior Acquisition"; after Sheldon misses Stan Lee's signing at Stuart's store, Penny gets his address and takes Sheldon to meet him at his house, resulting in him getting a restraining order from him.
- Stephen Hawking: First appearing in "The Hawking Excitation", Hawking meets Sheldon after Howard gives him his work, and provides Sheldon advice in "The Extract Obliteration", "The Relationship Diremption", "The Troll Manifestation", "The Celebration Experimentation", "The Geology Elevation", and "The Proposal Proposal".
- Steve Wozniak: Appearing in "The Cruciferous Vegetable Amplification", while using Shel-Bot to move around, Sheldon meets him at The Cheesecake Factory.
- Summer Glau: Appearing in "The Terminator Decoupling", the guys spot her while taking a train to San Francisco, and Raj, Howard and Leonard all attempt to approach her.
- William Shatner: Appearing in "The D&D Vortex", he meets Sheldon while appearing on Wil Wheaton's reboot of Professor Proton, and Sheldon subsequently vomits on him, and he is also a member of Wil Wheaton's Dungeons & Dragons group.

=== Young Sheldon ===
- David Hasselhoff: "Cowboy Aerobics and 473 Grease-Free Bolts"
- Stephen Hawking: "The Grand Chancellor and a Den of Sin" (voice only). Sheldon has a poster of him in his room.
- Cyndi Lauper: "A Baby Tooth and the Egyptian God of Knowledge" (voice only, saying the words of the title of her song, "Girls Just Want to Have Fun")
- Elon Musk: "A Patch, a Modem, and a Zantac®" in a flashforward scene set 27 years into the future. Elon is seen reading Sheldon's notebook describing reusable rocket boosters.

=== Georgie & Mandy's First Marriage ===
- Jay Leno: "Secrets, Lies, and a Chunk of Change" (voice only)
- Dr. Demento: "Heartbreak and the Refuge of the Downtrodden" and "A Stuffed Monkey and an Ex-Girlfriend" (voice only)
