= Rick Fox =

Canadian actor, professional basketball player (born 1969)

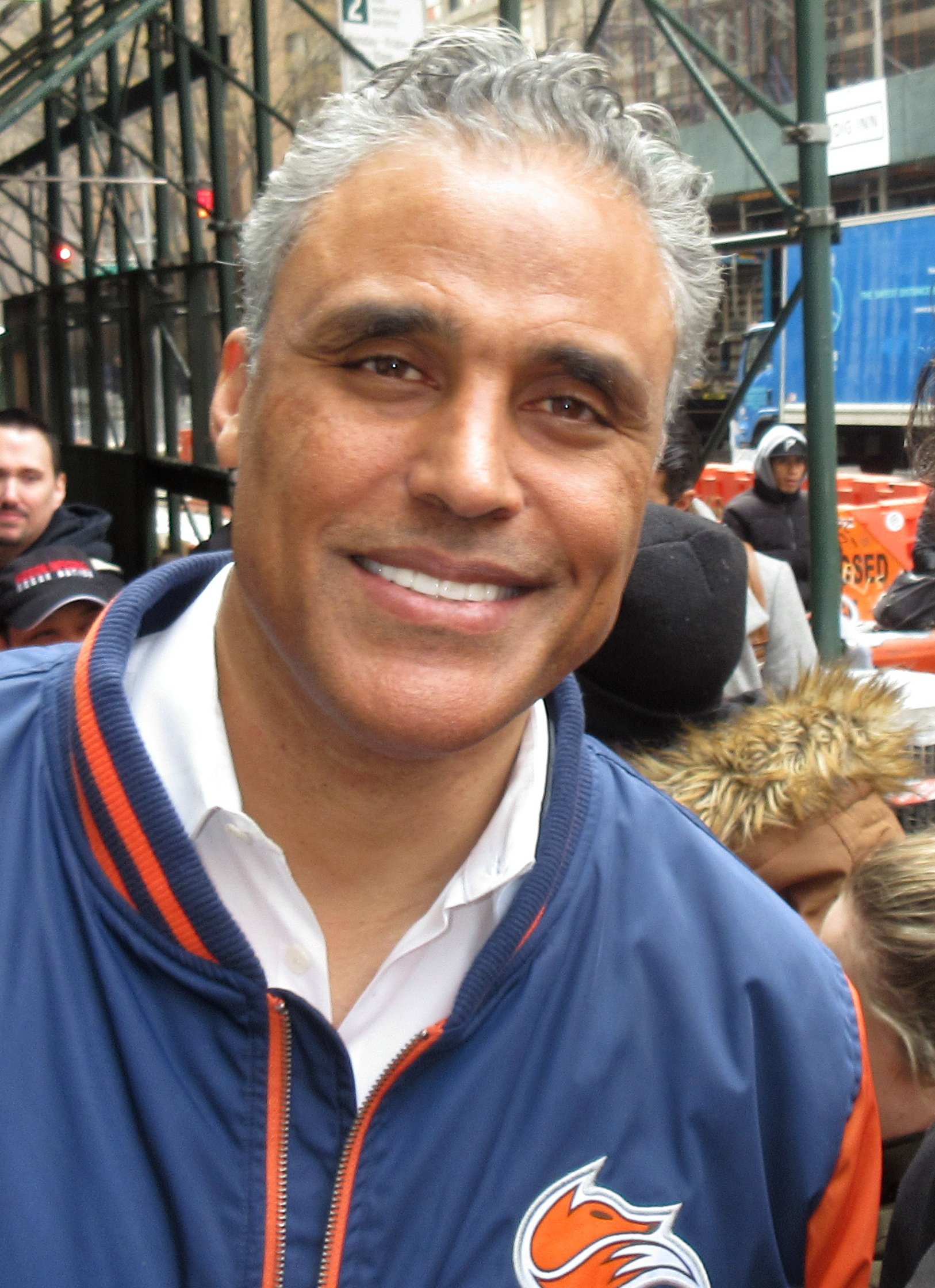
- Fox in 2019

Personal information
- Born: July 24, 1969 (age 57) Toronto, Ontario, Canada
- Listed height: 6 ft 7 in (2.01 m)
- Listed weight: 235 lb (107 kg)

Career information
- High school: Kingsway Academy (Nassau, The Bahamas); Warsaw Community (Warsaw, Indiana)
- College: North Carolina (1987–1991)
- NBA draft: 1991: 1st round, 24th overall pick
- Drafted by: Boston Celtics
- Playing career: 1991–2004
- Position: Small forward
- Number: 44, 17

Career history
- 1991–1997: Boston Celtics
- 1997–2004: Los Angeles Lakers

Career highlights
- 3× NBA champion (2000–2002); NBA All-Rookie Second Team (1992); First-team All-ACC (1991); Third-team All-ACC (1990); ACC tournament MVP (1991)

Career NBA statistics
- Points: 8,966 (9.6 ppg)
- Rebounds: 3,517 (3.8 rpg)
- Assists: 2,649 (2.8 apg)
- Stats at NBA.com
- Stats at Basketball Reference

Ulrich Alexander "Rick" Fox (born July 24, 1969) is a Bahamian-Canadian former basketball player, three-time NBA champion, actor, businessman and politician. He played in the National Basketball Association for both the Boston Celtics and Los Angeles Lakers, and played college basketball for the North Carolina Tar Heels. He was the owner of the eSports franchise Echo Fox until his departure from the franchise in October 2019. In 2026, he was appointed to the Senate of the Bahamas as an opposition senator.

His acting credits include roles in Oz, He Got Game, One Tree Hill, Ugly Betty, The Game, The Big Bang Theory, Meet the Browns, Greenleaf, Melrose Place, Mr. Box Office, Sin City Saints, Krystal, Sharknado, Morning Show Mysteries, All Rise, Holes and Highest 2 Lowest.

== Early life ==
Ulrich Alexander Fox was born on July 24, 1969, in Toronto, Canada, the son of Dianne Gerace, who was an Olympic high jumper and women's pentathlete, and Ulrich Fox. His father is Bahamian and his mother is Canadian of Italian and Scottish descent. Fox's family moved to his father's native Bahamas when Fox was young. He attended Kingsway Academy in Nassau. Despite never playing organized basketball before, he went to a summer camp and became a member of the high school's basketball team, the Saints. Fox also played high school basketball in Warsaw, Indiana. After two seasons (1984–1986) at Warsaw, Fox was projected to have a very successful senior season. Just before his senior season, the Indiana High School Athletic Association (IHSAA) ruled that he had no more high school eligibility left (due to completing eight semesters between the Bahamas and Indiana) and was not allowed to participate in any further IHSAA games. Despite not playing his senior season, Fox was voted onto the Indiana All-Star team in 1987. He then went on to star collegiately at the University of North Carolina.

== Professional career ==
=== Boston Celtics (1991–1997) ===
Fox was selected by the Boston Celtics in the first round (24th pick overall) of the 1991 NBA draft. As a member of the Celtics, Fox became the first rookie starter on opening night since Larry Bird in 1979 and made the 1992 NBA All-Rookie Second Team after averaging 8 points per game. By the 1995–96 season, Fox became the team's starting small forward and achieved double-figure scoring. He recorded career highs of 15.4 points a game and 2.2 steals a game (fifth in the league) and made 101 three-point field goals in the 1996–97 season.

=== Los Angeles Lakers (1997–2004) ===
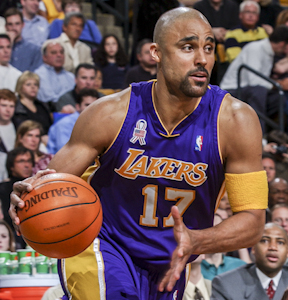
Fox with Los Angeles Lakers, 2002

In the summer of 1997, the Celtics released Fox, and he signed with the Los Angeles Lakers. He played and started in all 82 games during the 1997–98 season, averaging 12 points per game. In the playoffs, he tallied 10.9 points a game as the Lakers advanced to the Western Conference Finals before losing to the Utah Jazz. In the 1998–99 season, the Lakers acquired All-Star small forward Glen Rice. Fox primarily served as his backup during the next two seasons.

In the 1999–2000 season playoffs, Fox played all 23 games as the Lakers advanced to the 2000 NBA Finals against the Indiana Pacers. In the Finals, Fox averaged 6.7 points, including 11 in the Lakers' game 1 victory. In game 6, with the Lakers leading the series 3–2, Fox hit a critical three-pointer in the fourth quarter to help the Lakers' final rally as they won the game and the NBA title, Fox's first.

Following the departure of Glen Rice, Fox started 77 of 82 games in the 2000–01 season, posting an average of 9.6 points a game while shooting 39% from three-point range. In the playoffs, Fox started in all 16 games as the Lakers swept through the first three rounds and reached the 2001 NBA Finals against the Philadelphia 76ers. Fox scored 19 points in the Lakers' game 1 loss; the 76ers were led by Allen Iverson's 48 points. The Lakers would win the next four games of the series, securing their second straight championship. In the fifth game, Fox contributed with 20 points, and hit all three of his three-point field goal attempts.

In the 2001–02 season, Fox played and started in all 82 games in the regular season and in all of the Lakers' 19 playoff games. The Lakers faced a grueling 7-game series against the Sacramento Kings, with Fox scoring 13 points in the Lakers' game 7 victory in Sacramento.

In the 2002 NBA Finals against the New Jersey Nets, Fox averaged 9.8 points, 6.3 rebounds, and 1.5 steals as the Lakers swept the Nets in 4 games to win their third straight NBA title. In the beginning of the 2002 season, Fox was suspended 6 games after fighting with Sacramento Kings player Doug Christie in the preseason. In the 2002–03 season, Fox started in 75 of 76 games but suffered an ankle injury that kept him out of the last two games of the first round against the Minnesota Timberwolves and the entire Western Conference Semi-final series against the San Antonio Spurs. The Spurs defeated the Lakers 4–2. Fox missed 40 games in the 2003–04 season due to a foot injury, but started in 34 of 38 games while active. He would only start in 3 of 16 playoff games as the Lakers advanced to the 2004 NBA Finals but lost to the Detroit Pistons in 5 games. In 56 career NBA playoff games, Fox averaged 6.1 points per game, 2.6 rebounds, and 1.8 assists. Following the 2003–04 season, Fox was traded back to the Celtics in a deal that brought Chucky Atkins to the Lakers, but opted to retire instead of suiting up for the Celtics. During his 13-year NBA career, Fox earned more than $34 million in salary.

=== National team ===
Fox played internationally for Canada twice at the 1990 and 1994 FIBA World Championships.

== Acting career ==
=== During NBA career ===
In 1994, Fox appeared in the film Blue Chips as a member of the Western University basketball team. In 1996, Fox then played the role of Terry Hastings in the film Eddie, a slumping basketball player who receives help from fan "Eddie" played by Whoopi Goldberg. Fox then had a role as the ladies man Chick Deagan in the 1998 film He Got Game, a film directed by Spike Lee. In 1997, Fox began to portray prison inmate Jackson Vahue on the HBO prison drama Oz, appearing in 11 episodes of the show between 1997 and 2003.

Fox was a supporting actor in the 1999 film Resurrection playing the role of Detective Scholfield and the role of Ray in the television film The Collectors. At the time, ESPN quoted Fox as saying of trying to balance his acting career with his sports career that, "I mean, Penny Marshall is courtside. You got Jack (Nicholson) and Denzel (Washington). The head of the William Morris Agency is there. (Ally McBeal creator) David E. Kelley comes to some games ... I want to jump into conversations with them, but I'm working!"

In addition to Oz, Fox appeared in three more television series in the year 2003. On the first season of the crime drama 1-800-Missing starring Vivica A. Fox, Rick Fox played the role of Eric Renard over five episodes. He also provided the voice of the characters Flash Williams and Smooth Daley on the Crime Wave/Odd Ball episode of Nickelodeon's animated series The Fairly OddParents, and played the role of Peter Sampson on the television series Street Time. As Eric Renard he played the love interest of the FBI agent Brooke Haslett, played by actress Gloria Reuben. That year he also appeared in the Walt Disney Pictures film Holes with the supporting character role of Clyde 'Sweetfeet' Livingston, a baseball player.

=== Post-NBA acting career ===
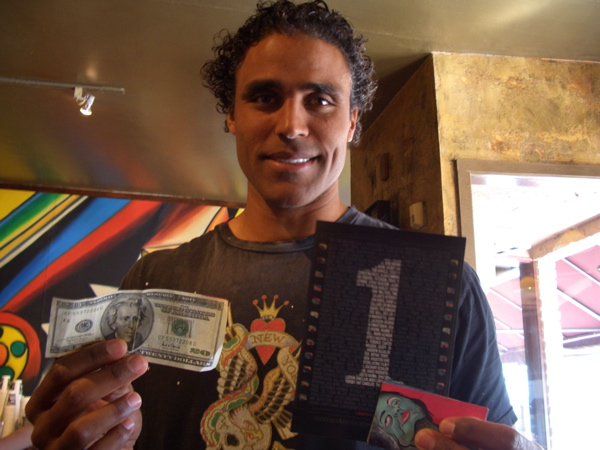
Fox holding a producer credit for The 1 Second Film in May 2006

In 2005, Fox guest starred as the character Stephen Melbourne in the UPN television series Kevin Hill and appeared in Love, Inc. as the character David Marley. In 2006 Fox played the role of Fabrizio in the film Mini's First Time the same year he appeared in 5 episodes as villain Daunte in the CW drama series One Tree Hill, which has basketball as its central sport. In 2007, Fox played Wilhelmina Slater's bodyguard and lover Dwayne in the second season of Ugly Betty, opposite his former wife Vanessa Williams. The following year Fox signed on with the show Dirt to play a recurring role in a multi-episode storyline lasting six episodes playing the role of Prince Tyrese. In 2008 and 2009, he had a recurring role (as a fictionalized version of himself) on the BET comedy-drama television series The Game, also returning to reprise his role in the 2012 season finale. In 2008, Fox also had a lead role in Tyler Perry's Meet the Browns as Harry, a coach trying to court the character of Brenda played by Angela Bassett. In 2009, Fox played himself in Head Case, and had recurring roles on VH1's Single Ladies and Tyler Perry's House of Payne. Also in 2009, Fox played himself in an episode of the Starz comedy series Party Down. In 2010, Fox briefly guest starred on the science-fiction series Dollhouse, and took on a recurring role on the CW remake of Melrose Place. In 2011, Fox played the role of Bernadette's ex-boyfriend Glenn in The Big Bang Theory episode "The Love Car Displacement". In an article about his appearance, TV Guide quoted Fox as saying about his role, "It's all in Glenn's head now. 'How am I losing to this guy? He's smarter than me ... I love that they turned the 'threatening ex' on its ear. At the end of the day, I have more insecurity about my intellect and am constantly fighting to be accepted intellectually and be seen for more than my looks and my size. I want to appear intelligent and prove my intelligence. That's where I'm battling with him."

In 2011, Fox also played a suspect on the crime drama Body of Proof and in 2012 he played the character Andre Carson on the series Franklin & Bash. He also played the recurring role of Winston on Single Ladies and Andrew Thompson in the series Mr. Box Office.

In 2013, Fox played the role of Chase Vincent in the VH1 series Hit the Floor. In 2014, Fox guest-starred as the character Dr. James Kendall in the CBS television series Mom. On the same airdate, he appeared as himself on an episode of the CBS sitcom The McCarthys. In 2015, Fox played the role of Sam Johnson, the general manager for the eponymous basketball team on Yahoo's original series Sin City Saints, he appeared in the TV film Sharknado 3: Oh Hell No!, and played retired basketball player Calvin Owens on iZombie. In 2016, Fox also appeared in the Showtime original series Shameless.

From 2018 to 2019, Fox co-starred in the first five instalments of Hallmark's Morning Show Mysteries, based on the novels of Al Roker. In 2019 he played the role of "Roger" in the holiday TV movie One Fine Christmas. He played the role of journalist Darius Nash on the OWN series Greenleaf.

In 2022, the Bahamian government appointed Fox as Ambassador-at-large for Sports.

=== Reality television ===
In late 2010, Fox was a celebrity contestant on ABC's Dancing with the Stars, pairing with pro Cheryl Burke. They came in sixth place. He was also host of the Jace Hall Show for five episodes. Fox appeared as a contestant on Are You Smarter than a Fifth Grader?, in season 3. He was a special guest judge during season 4 of RuPaul's Drag Race. And in 2017, Fox was a contestant on the Chopped Star Power actors competition. Fox came in second place.

== Professional gaming ==
In 2015, Fox and partner Amit Raizada acquired professional League of Legends team Gravity Gaming of the North American League of Legends Championship Series, re-branding it to Echo Fox.

In April 2019 Echo Fox confirmed to ESPN that Amit Raizada, one of its co-founders, had used racist language multiple times, including in a confrontation with Fox.

In response, Riot Games, which operates the LCS, launched an investigation. It ordered Echo Fox to remove Razaida, or it would have to sell its spot in the LCS within 60 days, saying "hate speech, threats, and bigotry have no place in the LCS." Riot Games came up with an agreement to end Echo Fox's participation in the LCS, eventually resulting in Evil Geniuses acquiring the team's spot. With Echo Fox unable to remove Razaida, Fox notified Echo Fox shareholders that he would be exiting the organization as soon as he could facilitate a transaction. In an email, obtained by Dexerto, Fox said: "the recent outrageous and abhorrent display of pure racism made by a significant Echo Fox shareholder as well as threats to my family have made it impossible for me to continue remain associated with the company."

In a statement in November 2019, Fox confirmed he had left the organization. "On the [basketball] court and in the business world, teammates are everything and there must be unity and a shared sense of purpose in order to succeed. In the case of Echo Fox, the significant difference of values, ethics and commitment to integrity was very problematic and damaging", Fox said.

== Business career ==
Fox later became involved in business ventures beyond sports and entertainment. He is the co-founder and CEO of Partanna, a company developing lower-carbon construction materials, including a cement alternative and concrete products. In 2023, Architectural Digest reported on a demonstration home built in the Bahamas using Partanna materials, described by the company as carbon-negative and climate-resilient.

== Political career ==
In August 2022, the Bahamian government appointed Fox as an ambassador-at-large for sports. In late 2025, as Fox began publicly commenting on domestic politics and moving into frontline politics, Foreign Affairs Minister Fred Mitchell suggested that diplomats who could not support the government's mandate should step aside, and Fox said he had "zero intention" of stepping down.

On 25 November 2025, Fox announced his intention to run for a seat in the Bahamian House of Assembly in the 2026 Bahamian general election. He framed his platform around government transparency and a "modern economy" focused on affordability and security. In February 2026, Fox was ratified as the Free National Movement (FNM) candidate for the Garden Hills constituency, after months of publicly criticising both major parties and at times suggesting he might run as an independent. Days later, Prime Minister Philip Davis said Fox had sought a nomination from the governing Progressive Liberal Party (PLP) shortly before joining the FNM.

In financial declarations filed ahead of the election, Fox reported assets of about $469 million and income of $4.8 million, making him the wealthiest candidate in the election. His declared assets included $432 million in securities and investments, $14.5 million in accounts receivable, $11 million in real estate and about $192,000 in bank holdings, while his declared income included a $1 million salary. The declared figures were far higher than earlier media estimates of Fox's net worth, which had generally put it at more than $20 million; candidate financial declarations are not independently audited or certified before publication.

Questions about Fox's citizenship and eligibility have also featured in local political debate. In October 2025, Fox said he would be willing to renounce his Canadian citizenship if he entered "frontline politics". The Bahamas generally does not recognise dual citizenship under its nationality law. Under the Constitution of The Bahamas, a person is disqualified from election to the House of Assembly if they are a citizen of another country "having become such a citizen voluntarily" or if they are, "by virtue of his own act", under any acknowledgment of allegiance to a foreign state. In December 2025, Deputy Prime Minister Chester Cooper publicly said he was unsure of Fox's nationality, adding that "if Rick is a Bahamian, he is free to run for politics".

Fox lost the Garden Hills race to incumbent PLP candidate Mario Bowleg, who had served as minister responsible for youth, sports and culture during Davis's first administration. On 18 May 2026, Fox was appointed to the Senate of the Bahamas as one of the four senators allocated to the opposition.

== Personal life ==
Fox has a son with Kari Hillsman, a woman he dated while playing basketball for the Boston Celtics. His son is an avid gamer and got his father into the eSports world.

Fox eloped with American actress/singer Vanessa Williams in the summer of 1999 in the Caribbean. They had another ceremony in September 1999 in New York City. They have a daughter. In August 2004, Fox filed for divorce from Williams. Fox and Williams' split, however, was amicable enough for the two of them to work onscreen together several years later on the television show Ugly Betty.

Fox and actress Eliza Dushku dated from October 2009 to June 2014.

Fox was mistakenly reported to have been among the passengers killed in a helicopter crash alongside his former teammate Kobe Bryant in Calabasas, California on January 26, 2020; these claims were contradicted by Fox and his family.

== NBA career statistics ==
Legend
GP	Games played	GS	Games started	MPG	Minutes per game
FG%	Field goal percentage	3P%	3-point field goal percentage	FT%	Free throw percentage
RPG	Rebounds per game	APG	Assists per game	SPG	Steals per game
BPG	Blocks per game	PPG	Points per game	**Bold**	Career high
†	Won an NBA championship	*	Led the league

=== Regular season ===
Year	Team	GP	GS	MPG	FG%	3P%	FT%	RPG	APG	SPG	BPG	PPG
1991–92	Boston	81	5	19.0	.459	.329	.755	2.7	1.6	1.0	.4	8.0
1992–93	Boston	71	14	15.2	**.484**	.174	.802	2.2	1.6	.9	.3	6.4
1993–94	Boston	**82**	53	25.6	.467	.330	.757	4.3	2.6	1.0	**.6**	10.8
1994–95	Boston	53	7	19.6	.481	**.413**	.772	2.9	2.6	1.0	.4	8.8
1995–96	Boston	81	81	32.0	.454	.364	.772	**5.6**	**4.6**	1.4	.5	14.0
1996–97	Boston	76	75	**34.9**	.456	.363	.787	5.2	3.8	**2.2**	.5	**15.4**
1997–98	L.A. Lakers	**82***	**82***	33.0	.471	.325	.743	4.4	3.4	1.2	**.6**	12.0
1998–99	L.A. Lakers	44	1	21.5	.448	.337	.742	2.0	2.0	.6	.2	9.0
1999–00†	L.A. Lakers	**82**	1	18.0	.414	.326	.808	2.4	1.7	.6	.3	6.5
2000–01†	L.A. Lakers	**82**	77	27.9	.444	.393	.779	4.0	3.2	.9	.4	9.6
2001–02†	L.A. Lakers	**82**	**82**	27.9	.421	.313	**.824**	4.7	3.5	.8	.3	7.9
2002–03	L.A. Lakers	76	75	28.7	.422	.375	.754	4.3	3.3	.9	.2	9.0
2003–04	L.A. Lakers	38	34	22.3	.392	.246	.733	2.7	2.6	.8	.1	4.8
Career		930	587	25.5	.450	.349	.770	3.8	2.8	1.0	.4	9.6

=== Playoffs ===
Year	Team	GP	GS	MPG	FG%	3P%	FT%	RPG	APG	SPG	BPG	PPG
1992	Boston	8	0	8.4	.478	**.500**	**1.000**	.8	.5	.3	.3	3.6
1993	Boston	4	0	17.8	.280	.333	**1.000**	4.8	1.3	.5	.3	4.3
1998	L.A. Lakers	13	13	32.9	.447	.396	.826	4.5	**3.9**	.8	.2	**10.9**
1999	L.A. Lakers	8	1	22.6	.400	.190	**1.000**	2.8	1.5	.5	**.6**	6.6
2000†	L.A. Lakers	**23**	0	14.4	.452	.462	.762	1.7	1.2	.4	.0	4.3
2001†	L.A. Lakers	16	16	**35.8**	.450	.316	.867	4.9	3.6	**1.9**	.4	10.0
2002†	L.A. Lakers	19	**19**	34.3	**.482**	.349	.755	**5.4**	3.4	1.1	.3	9.8
2003	L.A. Lakers	4	4	19.8	.444	.500	.750	1.5	1.8	.3	.3	6.0
2004	L.A. Lakers	16	3	9.1	.400	.143	.500	1.4	1.1	.2	.1	1.1
Career		111	56	22.8	.444	.360	.801	3.2	2.2	.8	.2	6.6

== Filmography ==
=== Film ===
List of film credits
Year	Title	Role	Notes
1994	Blue Chips	The Texas Western Team	
1996	Eddie	Terry Hastings	
1998	He Got Game	Chick Deagan	
1999	Resurrection	Scholfield	
2003	Holes	Clyde "Sweetfeet" Livingston	
2006	Mini's First Time	Fabrizio	
2008	Meet the Browns	Harry	
2010	Fox vs. Fox	unknown role	Short film
2010	Hysteria	N/A	Producer
2011	Dan Savage's New Threat to Rick Santorum	unknown role	Short film
2013	Mr. Sophistication	Himself	
2015	Dope	Councilman Blackmon	
2015	Back to School Mom	Matthew Kessler	
2015	Hollywood Adventures	Himself	
2015	Navy Seals vs. Zombies	Vice President Bentley	
2015	Dear Albania	Himself	
2015	The Christmas Gift	Cooper	
2017	A Curry on an American Plate	Robert	
2017	Game	Coach	Short film
2017	Killing Hasselhoff	Himself	
2017	Krystal	Bo	
2018	A Twist of Christmas	Dr. Thomas Baxter	
2023	The Retirement Plan	Christopher	
2023	Some Other Woman	Salvador Ranza	
2025	Highest 2 Lowest	Coach Fox	

=== Television ===
List of television credits
Year	Title	Role	Notes
1997	Head Over Heels	Himself	Episode: "Vice Guy"
1997–2003	Oz	Jackson Vahue	Recurring role; 11 episodes
1999	The Collectors	Ray	TV movie
2000	Max Steel	Himself	Episode: "Sports Day"
2001	Arli$$	Himself	Episode: "You Are Your Priorities"
2003	Street Time	Peter Samson	Episode: "Even"
2003	The Fairly Odd Parents	Flash Williams/Smooth Daley (voice role)	Episode: "Crime Wave/Odd Ball"
2003	1-800-Missing	Eric Renard	Recurring role; 5 episodes
2005	Kevin Hill	Stephen Melbourne	Episode: "The Monroe Doctrine"
2005–06	Love, Inc.	David	Recurring role; 6 episodes
2006	One Tree Hill	Daunte Jones	Recurring role; 4 episodes
2007	Ugly Betty	Dwayne	2 episodes
2007	Head Case	Himself	Episode: "Ladies Night"
2008	Are You Smarter Than a 5th Grader?	Himself (contestant)	2 episodes
2007–08	Dirt	Prince Tyreese	Recurring role; 6 episodes
2007–13	The Game	Himself	Recurring role; 26 episodes
2009	Party Down	Himself	Episode: "Brandix Corporate Retreat"
2009–10	Melrose Place	Mason	2 episodes
2010	Dollhouse	Gary Walden (uncredited)	Episode: "Getting Closer"
2010	Pros vs. Joes	Himself	Episode: "17's the Magic Number"
2010	Dancing with the Stars	Himself (contestant)	Series regular; 13 episodes (Season 11)
2011	The Big Bang Theory	Glenn	Episode: "The Love Car Displacement"
2011	The Guild	Himself	Episode: "Social Traumas"
2011	Body of Proof	Ted Banning	Episode: "Love Thy Neighbor"
2011	House of Payne	Roland	Recurring role; 4 episodes
2011–12	Single Ladies	Winston	Recurring role; 6 episodes
2012	Franklin & Bash	Andre Carson	Episode: "Jango & Rossi"
2012	RuPaul's Drag Race	Himself (Guest Judge)	2 episodes
2012	The Eric Andre Show	Himself	Episode: "Russell Brand"
2011–13	Jake and Amir	Himself	Television short; 4 episodes
2012–13	Mr. Box Office	Andrew Thompson	Series regular; 13 episodes
2013	Off Season: Lex Morrison Story	Lex Morrison	TV movie
2013	The Glades	Darius Locke	Recurring role; 3 episodes
2013–16	Hit the Floor	Chase Vincent	Recurring role; 9 episodes
2014	The McCarthys	Himself	Episode: "Why Guys Shouldn't Date Their Sister's Ex"
2014	Mom	James	Episode: "Crazy Eyes and a Wet Brad Pitt"
2015	Sin City Saints	Sam Johnson	Recurring role; 4 episodes
2015	Herman the Monkey	Himself	unknown episode/also Executive Producer
2015	Sharknado 3: Oh Hell No!	Principle SSA Webb	TV movie
2015	iZombie	Calvin Owens	Episode: "Max Wager"
2015	The Christmas Gift	Cooper	TV movie
2015–16	Celebrity Name Game	Himself (Celebrity Player)	Recurring role; 5 episodes
2016	Shameless	Gareth	Episode: "Be a Good Boy. Come for Grandma"
2016	Shoot the Messenger	Anthony Telpher	Recurring role; 3 episodes
2016–17	K.C. Undercover	Richard Martin	Recurring role; 5 episodes
2017	Criminal Minds	Brian Stoll	Episode: "Neon Terror"
2017	Major Crimes	Himself	Episode: "Conspiracy (Part 1)"
2017	Black-ish	Himself	Episode: "Sugar Daddy"
2017	H1Z1: Fight for the Crown	Himself	Miniseries Also served as Executive Producer
2017	Chopped	Himself (Contestant)	Episode: "Star Power: Screen Sensations!"
2017	Match Game	Himself (Celebrity Panelist)	2 episodes
2017	Celebrity Family Feud	Himself (Contestant)	Episode: "Neil DeGrasse Tyson vs. Rick Fox and Boy Band vs. Girl Group"
2017–20	Greenleaf	Darius Nash	Series regular; 28 episodes
2018	Morning Show Mystery: Mortal Mishaps	Ian Jackson	TV movie
2018	Morning Show Mysteries: Murder on the Menu	Ian Jackson	TV movie
2018	Home & Family	Himself (Guest/Co-Host)	Recurring role; 5 episodes
2018	7 Days Out	Himself	Episode: "League of Legends"
2018	A Twist of Christmas	Dr. Thomas Baxter	TV movie
2019	The Cool Kids	Reggie	Episode: "Funeral Crashers"
2019	Ballers	Himself	Episode: "Municipal"
2019	Morning Show Mysteries: A Murder in Mind	Ian Jackson	TV movie
2019	Morning Show Mysteries: Countdown to Murder	Ian Jackson	TV movie
2019	Morning Show Mysteries: Death by Design	Ian Jackson	TV movie
2020	Law and Order: Special Victims Unit	Defense Attorney Edgar Goodwin	Episode: "Garland's Baptism by Fire"
2021	All Rise	August Fox	Recurring role; 3 episodes
2022	The Game (paramount+)	Rick Fox	Recurring Role: 2 episodes (season 2)
2023	Harlem	Phil Joseph	Guest appearance, episode: "An Assist from the Sidelines"

== Dancing with the Stars ==
Fox was paired with two-time DWTS winner Cheryl Burke for Season 11. The couple was eliminated on November 2, 2010, ending the competition in sixth place.

List of Dancing with the Stars season 11 performances
Week#	Dance / Song	Judge's scores			Result	Ref.
Week#	Dance / Song	Inaba	Goodman	Tonioli	Result	Ref.
1	Viennese waltz / "Crazy"	8	7	7	Safe	
2	Jive / "Tush"	7	7	7	Safe	
3	Samba / "Whine Up"	8	8	8	Safe	
4	Argentine tango / "Violentango"	6 6 (technical score)	7 7 (technical score)	7 6 (technical score)	Safe	
5	Rumba / "Hill Street Blues Theme"	8	8	8	Last to be called safe	
6	Tango / "You Really Got Me" Marathon Rock n' Roll / "La Grange"	8 Awarded	8 6	8 Points	Safe	
7	Quickstep / "Hey Pachuco" Group Cha-Cha-Cha / "Workin' Day and Night"	10^{1}/9 8	9 8	9 8	Eliminated	
^{1} – Score by guest judge Helio Castroneves.

== See also ==
- List of Canadian sports personalities
- List of people banned or suspended by the NBA
