= Off Season =

Off Season can refer to:

== Films ==
- Off Season (1992 film), a Swiss film
- Off Season (2001 film), a TV film
- Off Season (2012 film), an American film
- The Off Season, a 2004 independent horror film
- Offseason (film), a 2021 horror film by Mickey Keating

== Other uses ==
- Close season in sports
- Off Season (novel), by Jack Ketchum, 1980
- The Off-Season, a 2021 album by J.Cole
- The Offseason, a reality television series created by Midge Purce
- "Off Season", a song by YoungBoy Never Broke Again from his 2020 album Top
