= The Big Bang Theory season 4 =

The Big Bang Theory
- Season 4
- DVD cover art
- Showrunner: Bill Prady
- Starring: Johnny Galecki; Jim Parsons; Kaley Cuoco; Simon Helberg; Kunal Nayyar; Melissa Rauch; Mayim Bialik
- No. of episodes: 24

Release
- Original network: CBS
- Original release: September 23, 2010 – May 19, 2011

Season chronology
- ← Previous; Season 3 Next → Season 5

The fourth season of the American television sitcom The Big Bang Theory aired on CBS from September 23, 2010 to May 19, 2011.

Melissa Rauch and Mayim Bialik auditioned and were promoted to the main cast during this season as Dr. Bernadette Rostenkowski and Dr. Amy Farrah Fowler, respectively.

Johnny Galecki received a nomination for the Primetime Emmy Award for Outstanding Lead Actor in a Comedy Series at the 63rd Primetime Emmy Awards for the episode "The Benefactor Factor". Jim Parsons won the same award for the episode "The Agreement Dissection".

== Production ==
In March 2009, the series received a renewal for a third and fourth season through the 2010–11 television season.

During the season, Kaley Cuoco's character, Penny, was absent from the fifth and sixth episodes after Cuoco fell off a horse and broke her leg. When returning to the series, she was shown working as a bartender instead of waitressing at her usual workplace, The Cheesecake Factory, to hide her injury.

== Cast ==
=== Main cast ===
- Johnny Galecki as Dr. Leonard Hofstadter
- Jim Parsons as Dr. Sheldon Cooper
- Kaley Cuoco as Penny
- Simon Helberg as Howard Wolowitz
- Kunal Nayyar as Dr. Rajesh "Raj" Koothrappali
- Mayim Bialik as Dr. Amy Farrah Fowler
- Melissa Rauch as Bernadette Rostenkowski

=== Special guest cast ===
- Steve Wozniak as himself
- Katee Sackhoff as herself
- George Takei as himself
- Neil deGrasse Tyson as himself
- LeVar Burton as himself
- Brian Greene as himself

=== Recurring cast ===
- Vernee Watson as Althea
- Carol Ann Susi as Mrs. Wolowitz
- Laurie Metcalf as Mary Cooper
- Kevin Sussman as Stuart Bloom
- Aarti Mann as Priya Koothrappali
- Wil Wheaton as himself
- Brian Thomas Smith as Zack Johnson
- Joshua Malina as President Siebert
- Brian George as Dr. V.M. Koothrappali
- Alice Amter as Mrs. Koothrappali
- John Ross Bowie as Dr. Barry Kripke

=== Guest cast ===
- Charlotte Newhouse as Joy
- Annie O'Donnell as Mrs Fowler
- Eliza Dushku as FBI Agent Angela Page
- Keith Carradine as Wyatt
- Rick Fox as Glenn
- Jessica Walter as Mrs Latham
- Christopher Douglas Reed as Todd
- Lanny Joon as Officer Shin
- Arnold Chun as Ho-Jun
- Eric André as Joey
- Tiffany Dupont as Angela
- Whitney Avalon as Elsie
- Phil Abrams as Dr Bernstein

== Episodes ==
No. overall	No. in season	Title	Directed by	Written by	Original release date	Prod. code	U.S. viewers (millions)
64	1	"The Robotic Manipulation"	Mark Cendrowski	Story by : Chuck Lorre & Lee Aronsohn & Dave Goetsch; Teleplay by : Steven Molaro & Eric Kaplan & Steve Holland	September 23, 2010	3X6651	14.04
Howard uses a robotic hand for masturbation, but has to go to a hospital when it malfunctions. Penny learns about Amy, and Sheldon's plan to conceive a child with her by in vitro fertilisation. Penny then urges him to become intimate with Amy first. She accompanies them on their first date, but the conversation quickly turns to a statistical analysis of Penny's sexual history. Afterwards, Sheldon is still intent on having a child, but cancels the plan when Penny threatens to tell his mother.
65	2	"The Cruciferous Vegetable Amplification"	Mark Cendrowski	Story by : Bill Prady & Lee Aronsohn & Steve Holland; Teleplay by : Chuck Lorre & Steven Molaro & Jim Reynolds	September 30, 2010	3X6652	13.05
Sheldon worries that he will not live long enough to experience the technological singularity, so he tries to adopt a healthier lifestyle through diet and exercise. When that proves to be difficult, he hides in safety of his bedroom, interacting with the world through a remotely-controlled computer monitor on wheels (which Penny labels Shelbot). When Shelbot accompanies the men to the Cheesecake Factory, they see Steve Wozniak at another table, who offers to sign Sheldon's vintage Apple II computer. Sheldon emerges from his bedroom to rush the computer to the restaurant, but breaks the computer and an ankle falling down the stairs.
66	3	"The Zazzy Substitution"	Mark Cendrowski	Story by : Chuck Lorre & Bill Prady & Jim Reynolds; Teleplay by : Lee Aronsohn & Steven Molaro & Maria Ferrari	October 7, 2010	3X6653	12.59
Sheldon and Amy are very compatible with each other, but the rest of the group is irritated by their combined personalities. They are relieved when Sheldon and Amy break up after an argument over the relative significance of physics compared to neuroscience, but Leonard becomes worried when Sheldon brings 25 cats into the apartment. He calls in Sheldon's mother, who manipulates Sheldon into reconciling with Amy.
67	4	"The Hot Troll Deviation"	Mark Cendrowski	Story by : Chuck Lorre & Steven Molaro & Adam Faberman; Teleplay by : Bill Prady & Lee Aronsohn & Maria Ferrari	October 14, 2010	3X6654	12.57
Penny discovers that Howard and Bernadette broke up because Howard had online sex with a troll from his game, feeling rejected since they had not been intimate. She tells Howard that Bernadette is his best shot at a real relationship and helps set up a talk. Howard admits his mistake, and Bernadette reveals she was waiting for him to make the first move. They reconcile and go on a date, but Bernadette stops Howard from making a move, wanting to get to know him again first. Meanwhile, Sheldon and Raj clash over office space after Raj brings in an oversized desk. Their feud escalates until Raj accidentally causes an explosion by mixing aromatherapy candles with hydrogen sulfide, ultimately conceding defeat.
68	5	"The Desperation Emanation"	Mark Cendrowski	Story by : Bill Prady & Lee Aronsohn & Dave Goetsch; Teleplay by : Chuck Lorre & Steven Molaro & Steve Holland	October 21, 2010	3X6655	13.05
When Amy decides to introduce Sheldon to her mother, he becomes worried as being introduced to Amy's mother would indicate that Amy wants to be his girlfriend, which he is not ready for. So he begins to avoid Amy, removing all possible contact with her and even disguising himself so that she would not recognize him. However Amy catches Sheldon outside the apartment building and then calms him down, assuring him that she only wants to introduce him to her mother so that she would be convinced that Amy is in a relationship and leave her alone. Later when talking to Amy's mother, a now relieved Sheldon and Amy lie to Amy's mother that they are in a "sexual relationship", which does not go too well with her. Meanwhile, as Howard now has a girlfriend, Leonard decides to invoke the "Girlfriend Pact" with Howard. Howard and Bernadette set up a double date with Leonard and one of Bernadette's friends, Joy. Joy behaves in an obnoxious and inappropriate manner during the date, which disgusts Leonard. However he later accepts another date with Joy due to understanding that sex is a strong possibility. Absent: Kaley Cuoco as Penny.
69	6	"The Irish Pub Formulation"	Mark Cendrowski	Story by : Chuck Lorre & Lee Aronsohn & Steven Molaro; Teleplay by : Bill Prady & Eric Kaplan & Maria Ferrari	October 28, 2010	3X6656	13.04
Raj's younger sister Priya visits Pasadena. Though unknown to the others including Raj, Priya had been involved in a sexual encounter with Leonard five years earlier, despite Leonard's assurance to Howard that he would never hit on Priya in deference to Raj. That night, Priya sneaks into Leonard and Sheldon's apartment unknown to Sheldon and has sex with Leonard. Sheldon finds out the following morning and frames an elaborate, flawless lie to cover it up. But Leonard decides not to hide the truth and confesses to Raj, who is initially upset, but reconciles with Leonard after he says that Priya broke his heart. The guys then unleash confessions of all of the deceptions they have perpetrated on each other. Absent: Kaley Cuoco as Penny.
70	7	"The Apology Insufficiency"	Mark Cendrowski	Story by : Chuck Lorre & Lee Aronsohn & Maria Ferrari; Teleplay by : Bill Prady & Steven Molaro & Steve Holland	November 4, 2010	3X6657	14.00
Howard needs security clearance to work on a new project, so an FBI agent comes to ask Leonard, Sheldon and Raj about his background. Since the agent is an attractive woman, Raj and Leonard embarrass themselves. Sheldon, however, tells her about the time Howard drove a Mars rover into a ditch (The Lizard–Spock Expansion), so Howard is rejected for the project. Howard rejects Sheldon's apologies until he is allowed to sit in Sheldon's spot on the couch, although Sheldon takes it back after 94 seconds.
71	8	"The 21-Second Excitation"	Mark Cendrowski	Story by : Chuck Lorre & Bill Prady & Jim Reynolds; Teleplay by : Lee Aronsohn & Steven Molaro & Steve Holland	November 11, 2010	3X6658	13.11
The men try to attend a screening of Raiders of the Lost Ark with 21 seconds of previously unseen footage, but are displaced by Wil Wheaton and his friends cutting in front of them. Sheldon then retaliates by stealing the film from the theater and the guys get chased by the moviegoers. Meanwhile, Amy gets herself invited to a "girls' night" with Penny and Bernadette. She turns out to be an awkward participant, while Penny becomes uncomfortable when the others pressure her with truth-or-dare questions about why she ended her romance with Leonard.
72	9	"The Boyfriend Complexity"	Mark Cendrowski	Story by : Chuck Lorre & Lee Aronsohn & Jim Reynolds; Teleplay by : Bill Prady & Steven Molaro & Dave Goetsch	November 18, 2010	3X6659	13.02
Penny's father, Wyatt, has come to visit. Since he feels that Leonard is the best man that Penny ever dated, she asks Leonard to pretend that they are still together. Leonard happily plays along until Penny confesses to Wyatt. Wyatt is angry that Penny does not trust him, and pleads with Leonard not to give up on her. Meanwhile, Howard and Bernadette stay with Raj in his telescope control room. He becomes drunk and complains that he will never kiss a woman. When Bernadette expresses sympathy, he leans in to kiss her, but ends up kissing Howard.
73	10	"The Alien Parasite Hypothesis"	Mark Cendrowski	Story by : Chuck Lorre & Steven Molaro & Steve Holland; Teleplay by : Lee Aronsohn & Jim Reynolds & Maria Ferrari	December 9, 2010	3X6660	12.03
Amy meets Penny's ex-boyfriend Zack and experiences sexual arousal. She later discusses her symptoms with Sheldon, who appears to be jealous. Later, when Sheldon discusses Amy's situation with Penny, she tells him that there is "something" he could do about Amy's "urges", meaning that he should have sex with Amy, but Sheldon assumes that she meant Amy and Zack should have sex. He arranges for them to meet again, but Amy discovers that Zack is not very intelligent, solving the problem. Meanwhile, Howard and Raj argue about, if they both acquired superpowers, which of them would be the sidekick. They try to settle the issue in a wrestling match refereed by Leonard, but they merely circle around goading each other.
74	11	"The Justice League Recombination"	Mark Cendrowski	Story by : Chuck Lorre & Lee Aronsohn & Maria Ferrari; Teleplay by : Bill Prady & Steven Molaro & Steve Holland	December 16, 2010	3X6661	13.24
Penny gets back together with Zack. The guys insult Zack's low intelligence which upsets him; however he reconciles with the four and accompanies them to the comic book store. The five enter a costume contest and urge Penny to join in a Wonder Woman costume. She refuses until Leonard talks to her. She reveals that she got back together with Zack only because she did not want to spend New Year's Eve alone. Leonard questions why not with him, prompting Penny, seeing Leonard sad, to change her mind. At the comic book store, the group win the award for the Best Group Costume, although it is hinted that they only won because they included a female Wonder Woman. The episode concludes with the six witnessing an ongoing car theft and then scurrying off cowardly despite wearing Justice League costumes.
75	12	"The Bus Pants Utilization"	Mark Cendrowski	Story by : Chuck Lorre & Lee Aronsohn & Maria Ferrari; Teleplay by : Bill Prady & Steven Molaro & Eric Kaplan	January 6, 2011	3X6662	13.98
Leonard gets an idea for a differential equation app for smartphones, but Sheldon quickly tries to take charge of the project. After he is rejected by Howard, Raj, and Leonard, Sheldon tries to interfere with the project by loudly playing a theremin. When Penny finds Sheldon sadly playing his theremin in the building lobby, she tries to get him reconciled with the other men. When that fails, Sheldon reluctantly helps Penny with her idea of an app which uses her smartphone camera to scan the shoes she is looking at and show her where to order them online.
76	13	"The Love Car Displacement"	Anthony Rich	Story by : Chuck Lorre & Bill Prady & Dave Goetsch; Teleplay by : Lee Aronsohn & Steven Molaro & Steve Holland	January 20, 2011	3X6663	13.63
Amy asks Penny to join the group at a science conference in Big Sur. Things go fairly well until Howard meets Glenn, a large handsome man whom Bernadette used to date. Howard's insecurities anger her, setting off a chain reaction of bed swapping that causes the next day's science panel to become a series of personal recriminations, much to Sheldon's surprise. He tries to get the panel back on track by asking for questions from the audience, but the only question is from Penny for a ride back to Los Angeles. When Glenn offers to give her a lift, Leonard instantly objects. When the group drives back home (without Penny), everyone except Sheldon is in a foul mood.
77	14	"The Thespian Catalyst"	Mark Cendrowski	Story by : Chuck Lorre & Lee Aronsohn & Jim Reynolds; Teleplay by : Bill Prady & Steven Molaro & Maria Ferrari	February 3, 2011	3X6664	13.83
When Sheldon is unsuccessful as a lecturer due to his condescending personality, Amy suggests that he take acting lessons from Penny. Instead of using a professional script, he insists that they use a Star Trek fanfiction script which he wrote as a child. Penny plays the role of Spock as she feels that Sheldon needs to come out of his comfort zone, while Sheldon plays the dual role of himself and his mother. However while acting out the script, Sheldon immerses himself so deeply in the part that he is brought to tears, because he does not want to be taken away from his mother by Spock. Penny then calls his mother and gives the phone to Sheldon so that his mother can console him. Meanwhile, Raj becomes infatuated with Bernadette and fantasizes about them getting together.
78	15	"The Benefactor Factor"	Mark Cendrowski	Story by : Bill Prady & Lee Aronsohn & Dave Goetsch; Teleplay by : Chuck Lorre & Eric Kaplan & Steve Holland	February 10, 2011	3X6665	12.79
President Siebert invites the men to a fundraising event at Caltech. While Leonard, Howard and Raj are willing to attend, Sheldon feels that such events are beneath him. He changes his mind when Amy points out that, without his participation, any monies raised might go to programs other than physics. When he finally arrives, Siebert quickly regrets inviting him. Meanwhile, Leonard makes a good impression on the considerably older Mrs. Latham. The next day, she takes him out to dinner and makes it clear that she will only donate the money if Leonard has sex with her. He refuses, but everyone else urges him to go through with it. The next night, Latham apologizes to Leonard for making him uncomfortable and assures him that she will donate the money regardless of what happens. After she hints at her own sexual prowess, Leonard relents and sleeps with her and receives a standing ovation at work the next day, much to his embarrassment.
79	16	"The Cohabitation Formulation"	Mark Cendrowski	Story by : Chuck Lorre & Lee Aronsohn & Dave Goetsch; Teleplay by : Bill Prady & Steven Molaro & Jim Reynolds	February 17, 2011	3X6666	12.41
Priya returns and resumes dating Leonard, despite Raj's protests. Amy gets Penny to admit that she is extremely jealous of Priya, giving her the chance to measure the brainwaves associated with jealousy. Meanwhile, Bernadette is tired of Howard sneaking out of bed quickly to assist his mother and insists that he move in with her. He eventually does so, but when she discovers how Howard is completely dependent on his mother and now her to do everything for him, she forces him to move back in with his mother.
80	17	"The Toast Derivation"	Mark Cendrowski	Story by : Bill Prady & Dave Goetsch & Maria Ferrari; Teleplay by : Chuck Lorre & Steven Molaro & Jim Reynolds	February 24, 2011	3X6667	12.35
Leonard and Priya are dating and since she lives with Raj, Leonard and Howard decide to have dinner there instead of the normal venue, which disturbs Sheldon. He stops by the Cheesecake Factory where Penny tells him he has to accept that the gang will be hanging out at Raj's place more often. Amy tells him that Leonard is the nucleus of their social group and not Sheldon, so he sets up a new group consisting of Kripke, Stuart, Zack and LeVar Burton (whom he tweeted), with himself as the nucleus. Sheldon's plans are dismissed by the others in favor of Zack's dating stories, drinking and karaoke. Sheldon is unhappy, so he decides to go back to his old friends, who, in the meantime, realized that they actually missed Sheldon. In the end, LeVar Burton shows up, but when he sees Kripke, Stuart and Zack singing together, he leaves immediately. Meanwhile, Bernadette and Amy want to take Penny out dancing to get her mind off of Leonard and Priya. As she changes clothes, she tells the girls that it is the first time in her life she is satisfied with being single and does not want sex with a random guy to make up for it, however when Amy finds the encased snowflake that Leonard gave to her after his polar expedition, she changes her mind as her feelings for Leonard resurface again.
81	18	"The Prestidigitation Approximation"	Mark Cendrowski	Story by : Bill Prady & Steve Holland & Eddie Gorodetsky; Teleplay by : Chuck Lorre & Steven Molaro & Eric Kaplan	March 10, 2011	3X6668	12.06
Priya has begun to dominate in her relationship with Leonard, buying him new clothes (which he is not comfortable with). She feels threatened by his continuing to hang out with Penny, even though they have broken up, so she tells him to break all contact with Penny. Leonard tries to hint at this to Penny, but she remains completely oblivious and interrupts Leonard and Priya's date. The next day, realizing how uncomfortable Priya is with her, Penny reluctantly breaks all contact with Leonard. Meanwhile, Howard shows Sheldon, Raj and Penny a card trick in which a volunteer picks a card and after shuffling the deck, Howard tells the volunteer his/her card. Raj and Penny both try out the trick and are amazed by it. Though at first his attitude is dismissive, Sheldon eventually becomes obsessed with discovering the trick's secret and attempts to recreate it himself. He does not realize that the card trick is just a prank played on him by Howard, Raj and Penny; who knew that he would go crazy over the trick.
82	19	"The Zarnecki Incursion"	Peter Chakos	Story by : Chuck Lorre & Steven Molaro & Maria Ferrari; Teleplay by : Bill Prady & Dave Goetsch & Jim Reynolds	March 31, 2011	3X6669	11.92
Sheldon's World of Warcraft account has been hacked and all of his WoW possessions have been stolen. He enlists the help of the other guys in finding the hacker. Meanwhile, Amy, Bernadette and Penny criticize Priya and her arrogance. Penny takes the comments lightly, but after an encounter with Priya in the apartment lobby, she agrees with Amy. Howard manages to trace the hacker, Todd Zarnecki, and the guys then drive to Carlsbad to get back Sheldon's WoW possessions. Todd refuses to return them, and snatches the bat'leth that Sheldon had intended to intimidate him with. Defeated, the guys decide to return home, but their car breaks down midway, prompting Leonard to call Penny to fetch them. When Penny hears their story, she not only realizes that Leonard did not want to see Priya that night, but also drives them back to Todd's house where she delivers a groin kick and forces him to return everything.
83	20	"The Herb Garden Germination"	Mark Cendrowski	Story by : Chuck Lorre & Eric Kaplan & Eddie Gorodetsky; Teleplay by : Bill Prady & Steven Molaro & Steve Holland	April 7, 2011	3X6670	11.40
Penny spreads a rumor to Amy that Bernadette is considering breaking up with Howard. Amy spreads this rumor to Sheldon, who tells Leonard, who reveals it to Priya, who passes it on to Raj, who has a crush on Bernadette. Howard decides to propose marriage to Bernadette. Raj hopes that she will reject his proposal so that Bernadette will become available for dating him. The gossip swirling around these developments intrigue Amy and Sheldon enough to conduct an experiment in memetic epidemiology. They launch pairs of false gossip, only one of which is tantalizing, and measure how quickly they each spread. Bernadette accepts Howard's proposal, disappointing Raj.
84	21	"The Agreement Dissection"	Mark Cendrowski	Story by : Bill Prady & Dave Goetsch & Eddie Gorodetsky; Teleplay by : Chuck Lorre & Steven Molaro & Eric Kaplan	April 28, 2011	3X6671	10.71
When Leonard takes a shower with Priya, he gets charged with two violations of the roommate agreement: Leonard denied access to the bathroom when Sheldon had to urinate and Leonard was not the only person in the shower. However, Priya uses her legal skills to nullify the charges. When the guys take advantage of Priya's skills in order to eat Greek food, which Sheldon does not like at all, on pizza night, Sheldon seeks shelter with Penny, who invites him to join her on a girls' night out with Amy and Bernadette badmouthing Priya. After the girls have some cocktails and Sheldon mentions he had learned to dance at cotillions as a child, they take Sheldon dancing. Afterwards, Sheldon takes a drunken Amy back to her apartment. Amy tells Sheldon to fight dirty against Priya, and then proceeds to kiss him before rushing to her bathroom to vomit. The next day, Sheldon blackmails Leonard into signing a revised roommate agreement, threatening to send an e-mail informing Priya's parents about their relationship. Fearful of her parents learning of her dating a non-Indian, Priya urges a resistant Leonard to sign. Sheldon then receives a video call from a hungover and confused Amy, and assures her that nothing happened between them after the kiss and suggests they move forward from it, to which Amy agrees.
85	22	"The Wildebeest Implementation"	Mark Cendrowski	Story by : Chuck Lorre & Steven Molaro & Eric Kaplan; Teleplay by : Bill Prady & Eddie Gorodetsky & Maria Ferrari	May 5, 2011	3X6672	10.50
Bernadette reveals that she and Howard have been invited to a double date by Priya. Amy proposes to use Bernadette to spy on Priya and spread disinformation about Penny and Leonard. Meanwhile, Raj, who is still very lonely, visits Sheldon, who is busy developing a version of three-player chess. Raj asks whether he should take an experimental drug to cure his social anxiety. Sheldon advises Raj to do so and accompanies him to a coffee shop to observe the drug's effectiveness. It ends up working very well, as Raj starts to talk to a woman named Angela, who also seems to like him. However, Raj loses all his inhibitions and strips to his briefs, scaring off Angela, before he strips completely. Finally, Sheldon, Leonard and Howard play Sheldon's chess while a still-nude Raj watches them.
86	23	"The Engagement Reaction"	Howard Murray	Story by : Bill Prady & Eric Kaplan & Jim Reynolds; Teleplay by : Chuck Lorre & Steven Molaro & Steve Holland	May 12, 2011	3X6673	10.78
Bernadette and Howard decide to inform their respective parents about their engagement. Howard arranges a lunch for his fiancée and his mother and they end up getting along well. After Howard hears the good news while talking to his mother, who is in the bathroom, he tells her the news. To his horror, she collapses from an apparent heart attack. Howard takes her to hospital. The others rush to join him. Sheldon is initially reluctant and only agrees to go after Penny pressures him. When Bernadette finds out that Howard was telling his mother about his engagement before she collapsed, she is very upset, as she believes that she is the reason all this happened. The doctor informs them that it had not been a heart attack and that she wants to see Bernadette. It is revealed that she actually had food poisoning from the restaurant. Howard's mother worries about Bernadette's well-being, whom she actually likes. Bernadette ends up being mad at Howard, as he led her to believe that it was all her fault. While in the hospital, Priya and Penny start searching for the cafeteria and bond in the process. They mainly discuss Leonard's skills in the bedroom. Sheldon tries to avoid contact with anything in the hospital. To dodge a coughing patient, he shelters in what turns out to be a bio-hazard room. He is quarantined in the hospital for two weeks, with his hazmat-suited friends keeping him company.
87	24	"The Roommate Transmogrification"	Mark Cendrowski	Story by : Chuck Lorre & Steven Molaro & Eddie Gorodetsky; Teleplay by : Bill Prady & Eric Kaplan & Jim Reynolds	May 19, 2011	3X6674	11.30
Bernadette announces that she is getting her Ph.D. and being offered a well-paid job. She decides to buy Howard a Rolex watch and tells him to "let her worry about the money", a comment that disturbs Howard. Meanwhile, Leonard's and Priya's noisy sexual encounters send Raj to spend the night at Sheldon's apartment. When Leonard finds him in his bed, he proposes that Raj moves in with Sheldon until Priya finds her own place. Raj likes the idea, signs Sheldon's roommate paperwork and moves in with him. He then prepares a fancy dinner for them which delights Sheldon who decides Raj is a much better roommate than Leonard. Penny stops by, stays for dinner and the both of them get drunk. She confesses that she should not have broken up with Leonard, and tells Raj she would be "on" him if they were not friends. When Priya receives a video call from her parents, Leonard overhears them saying that she is moving back to India and interrupts, revealing their relationship to her parents. At the end of the episode, Sheldon discovers Leonard sleeping on their couch, just before Howard shows up after a fight with Bernadette over the watch. Penny wakes up in bed with Raj and becomes horrified when she realizes that she hooked up with him. She tells him not to say anything about the night before and tries to sneak out of the apartment; however, they are busted by the others. Penny just states that it is not what it looks like and leaves.

== Ratings ==
Viewership and ratings per episode of The Big Bang Theory season 4
No.	Title	Air date	Rating/share (18–49)	Viewers (millions)
1	"The Robotic Manipulation"	September 23, 2010	4.9/16	14.04
2	"The Cruciferous Vegetable Amplification"	September 30, 2010	4.4/14	13.06
3	"The Zazzy Substitution"	October 7, 2010	4.1/13	12.59
4	"The Hot Troll Deviation"	October 14, 2010	4.3/14	12.57
5	"The Desperation Emanation"	October 21, 2010	4.1/13	13.05
6	"The Irish Pub Formulation"	October 28, 2010	4.2/13	13.04
7	"The Apology Insufficiency"	November 4, 2010	4.7/14	14.00
8	"The 21-Second Excitation"	November 11, 2010	4.2/12	13.11
9	"The Boyfriend Complexity"	November 18, 2010	4.3/13	13.02
10	"The Alien Parasite Hypothesis"	December 9, 2010	3.9/12	12.03
11	"The Justice League Recombination"	December 16, 2010	4.0/13	13.24
12	"The Bus Pants Utilization"	January 6, 2011	4.4/13	13.98
13	"The Love Car Displacement"	January 20, 2011	4.2/12	13.63
14	"The Thespian Catalyst"	February 3, 2011	4.3/12	13.83
15	"The Benefactor Factor"	February 10, 2011	3.9/11	12.79
16	"The Cohabitation Formulation"	February 17, 2011	3.7/11	12.41
17	"The Toast Derivation"	February 24, 2011	3.8/11	12.35
18	"The Prestidigitation Approximation"	March 10, 2011	3.8/11	12.06
19	"The Zarnecki Incursion"	March 31, 2011	3.7/12	11.92
20	"The Herb Garden Germination"	April 7, 2011	3.7/12	11.40
21	"The Agreement Dissection"	April 28, 2011	3.3/10	10.71
22	"The Wildebeest Implementation"	May 5, 2011	3.2/11	10.50
23	"The Engagement Reaction"	May 12, 2011	3.4/11	10.78
24	"The Roommate Transmogrification"	May 19, 2011	3.6/12	11.30

== Reception ==
The fourth season received particular praise for character developments. Alan Sepinwall of Uproxx praised the additions of Bernadette and Amy to the cast, writing that "With Amy Farrah Fowler and Bernadette promoted to semi-permanent status, the show is now able to spend large chunks of each episode focusing only on the women, and in the process has made Penny a much more well-rounded character rather than just a foil for the nerds". Emily VanDerWerff of The A.V. Club wrote that "Jim Parsons and Kaley Cuoco's interplay remains the show's secret weapon", and Eric Hochberger of TV Fanatic wrote: "Really though, everything about the main story worked amazing. Mayim fits in perfectly in The Big Bang Theory cast and played off of Kaley Cuoco just as well as Emmy Award-winning Parsons".
