= The Hot Troll Deviation =

- The Big Bang Theory episode
- Episode no.: Season 4 Episode 4
- Directed by: Mark Cendrowski
- Story by: Chuck Lorre; Steven Molaro; Adam Faberman
- Teleplay by: Bill Prady; Lee Aronsohn; Maria Ferrari
- Production code: 3X6654
- Original air date: October 14, 2010

Guest appearances
- Katee Sackhoff as herself; George Takei as himself; Carol Ann Susi as Mrs. Wolowitz

Episode chronology
← Previous "The Zazzy Substitution"	Next → "The Desperation Emanation"
- The Big Bang Theory season 4

"The Hot Troll Deviation" is the fourth episode of the fourth season of the US sitcom The Big Bang Theory and the 67th episode of the show overall. It first aired on CBS on October 14, 2010. In the episode, Howard and Bernadette go on a date following their breakup a few months prior. Sheldon and Raj engage in a series of "tit for tat" exchanges when working together. The title refers to Howard's virtual affair with a troll on World of Warcraft.

The episode features guest appearances by actors Katee Sackhoff (Battlestar Galactica) and George Takei (Star Trek). They appear during Howard's fantasy and later, when Howard and Bernadette are "making out" in her car. Melissa Rauch became part of the main cast in this episode.

"The Hot Troll Deviation" was watched by 12.57 million viewers with a Nielsen rating of 7.6/13 in the U.S. It received mixed reviews and ratings.

== Plot ==
The guys go to the Cheesecake Factory and when Bernadette arrives, Howard hides under the table to avoid her. Later, Howard, to the theme music of Francis Lai's score from the 1966 film A Man and a Woman, is having a sexual fantasy with Katee Sackhoff wearing a flight suit from Battlestar Galactica. Bernadette then appears in the fantasy; Sackhoff says he still has feelings for Bernadette. George Takei then appears, making Sackhoff question Howard's sexuality. Sackhoff and Takei begin discussing their acting careers and the fantasy ends when Howard's mother starts shouting at him.

Penny agrees to help Howard if he reveals why he and Bernadette broke up. Bernadette caught him having cybersex with a World of Warcraft player, later revealed to be a male Caltech janitor. Howard and Bernadette go on a date at the Cheesecake Factory, with Penny eavesdropping on them. Although they never had sex, Bernadette claims this was because Howard never "made the move". They decide to give the relationship another try, and after a miniature golf date, make out in Bernadette's car. Sackhoff and Takei appear, giving Howard conflicting advice about whether to "make the move". He does, but Bernadette says she needs to get to know him again, reassuring him that they will get there.

Meanwhile, Raj insists he should get a desk, while Sheldon claims he does not need one, or have the money for one: As pointed out by Raj, Sheldon has money for a marshmallow rifle, drawer full of Red Vines and a phosphorescent ant farm. They compromise: Raj is allowed to purchase a desk with his own money. The desk is huge and ornate, deliberately chosen to irritate Sheldon. This begins a series of "tit-for-tat" exchanges; Raj brings a budgerigar into the office; Sheldon loudly plays Indian music; Raj turns the heat up; and they start shooting at each other, Sheldon with marshmallows and Raj with a Nerf gun. Sheldon tries making foul-smelling hydrogen sulfide and ammonia gases to force Raj out; Raj attempts to counter the smell with scented aromatherapy candles, but accidentally ignites the hydrogen sulfide. A scorched and singed Raj walks out of the office with the budgerigar, vowing revenge on Sheldon.

== Reception ==
=== Ratings ===
On the night of its first broadcast on October 14, 2010, the episode was watched by 12.57 million households in the U.S. It had a Nielsen rating of 7.6/13, with a 4.3/14 rating in its target demographic of ages 18–49. In Canada, the episode had 2.84 million viewers and a weekly ranking of 2.

In the UK, the episode aired on November 25, 2010. On E4 it had 0.72 million viewers and 0.26 million watched on E4 +1. The episode ranked second and third on the channels, respectively, with a total of 0.98 million watches. In Australia, the episode was first broadcast on February 8, 2011 and had 0.92 million viewers. This gave it a nightly ranking of 11.

=== Reviews ===
Emily VanDerWerff of The A.V. Club gave the episode a C+. She complimented the cast and the "rare" Raj and Sheldon storyline filled with "mostly funny sight gags". However, the writers were criticized, as was how the show "rarely takes chances" (perhaps because it is "such a big hit"), and how it is filled with "lazy" and "easy" jokes.

The TV Critic rated the episode 52 out of 100, concluding that there were "two good stories" but that "neither was well told". The recurring story arcs were said to "[reward] fans for paying attention" and the guest stars were complimented, George Takei for his "camp" acting and Katee Sackhoff for reappearing after a similar fantasy scene in "The Vengeance Formulation". However, the Sheldon and Raj plot "did not have time to develop properly" and Howard using his father abandoning him to pressure Penny was described as a "cheap joke".

Jenna Busch of IGN rated the episode 9 out of 10. She was "thrilled" to get a "Howard-centric episode", although sad that Leonard had such a small role. The masturbation scene was complimented, particularly for the "good cop/bad cop" roles of Sackhoff and Takei.

Eric Hochberger from TV Fanatic gave the episode 3.7 out of 5 stars. He also mentioned Leonard's lack of storylines. Bernadette's character was praised for fitting in better than on True Blood and George Takei was described as "fantastic". However, he points out that the show is "[playing] its storylines and jokes very safe", unlike in the first seasons.
