= The Guitarist Amplification =

- The Big Bang Theory episode
- Episode no.: Season 3 Episode 7
- Directed by: Mark Cendrowski
- Story by: Chuck Lorre; Lee Aronsohn
- Teleplay by: Bill Prady; Richard Rosenstock; Jim Reynolds
- Production code: 3X5557
- Original air date: November 9, 2009

Guest appearance
- Kevin Sussman as Stuart Bloom

Episode chronology
← Previous "The Cornhusker Vortex"	Next → "The Adhesive Duck Deficiency"
- The Big Bang Theory season 3

"The Guitarist Amplification" is the seventh episode of the third season and 47th episode overall of the American television sitcom The Big Bang Theory. It premiered on CBS in the United States on November 9, 2009. The episode features a guest appearance by American comedian Kevin Sussman.

== Production ==
The story and concept were created by series co-creator Chuck Lorre and writer Lee Aronsohn. The teleplay was written by co-creator Bill Prady, and writers Richard Rosenstock and Jim Reynolds, and was directed by Mark Cendrowski. During the filming of a comic book store sequence, Stuart Bloom (Kevin Sussman) ad-libbed a muttered "I love you" towards Penny (Kaley Cuoco) as she walked away. The scene was included despite The Big Bang Theory's prohibition of improvisation, and Sussman's character subsequently appeared more often as the show's writers used the moment in future episodes to regress Stuart into desperation and depression.

== Plot ==
Sheldon creates and tests a board game titled "Research Lab" with Leonard and Penny. The game is interrupted when Penny mentions that she plans to pick up her ex, Justin, from the airport and let him stay at her apartment for weeks. Leonard is uncomfortable with the decision, leading to the two arguing. Sheldon tries to ignore the fight by making a snow cone, and Penny eventually leaves. On the way to work, Leonard complains about Penny again, causing Sheldon to jump out of the car and walk. Later, at the comic book store, Howard and Raj weigh in on the situation, the two taking separate sides and arguing. As tension rises, Sheldon has a flashback to his parents' fights and leaves overwhelmed.

Sheldon later goes to the Cheesecake Factory to convince Penny to apologize, but she refuses. In the process, he reveals several complaints Leonard has about her, angering Penny even more. She storms over to Leonard's apartment to confront him. As they argue, Sheldon runs away again, ending up at Raj's apartment where Raj is also in a fight with his parents, and Howard's house where Howard is fighting with his mother. Leonard and Penny eventually find Sheldon at the comic book store, where he has isolated himself to escape their drama. After Leonard and Penny assume parental roles and try to reassure him, they reconcile their relationship, though the issue with Justin remains unresolved. The episode closes with Sheldon lying on Leonard's couch next to Justin, regretting not asking for more than the toy and comic book Penny bought to appease him.

== Reception ==
=== Ratings ===
On the night of its first broadcast on November 9, 2009, the episode was watched by 12.80 million households. Based on Nielsen ratings, the episode received a 7.9 rating/12 share. Between viewers aged between 18 and 49, it received a 4.7 rating/11 share.

=== Reviews ===
Robin Pierson of The TV Critic rated the episode 58 out of 100, praising its handling of various insecurities and quick flow through fighting sequences, while criticizing the lack of a serious conclusion in favor of a "lame punch line" and Stuart's character reduction in comparison to a previous portrayal as "a nice port of sanity in the sea of geekdom". Noel Murray of The A.V. Club rated the episode a B+, complimenting Jim Parsons' performance of Sheldon suffering through childhood trauma but lamenting Leonard and Penny's "hoary" plot of "girl's ex-boyfriend comes for a visit, rattling insecure new boyfriend". David Caballero of Collider ranked the episode eighth of underrated The Big Bang Theory episodes, commending Sheldon's "visceral reaction" to fighting and his dynamic with Leonard and Penny.
