= The Toast Derivation =

- The Big Bang Theory episode
- Episode no.: Season 4 Episode 17
- Directed by: Mark Cendrowski
- Story by: Bill Prady; Dave Goetsch; Jim Reynolds
- Teleplay by: Steven Molaro; Chuck Lorre; Eric Kaplan
- Production code: 3X6667
- Original air date: February 24, 2011

Guest appearances
- LeVar Burton as himself; Kevin Sussman as Stuart; Aarti Mann as Priya Koothrappali; John Ross Bowie as Barry Kripke; Brian Thomas Smith as Zack Johnson

Episode chronology
← Previous "The Cohabitation Formulation"	Next → "The Prestidigitation Approximation"
- The Big Bang Theory season 4

"The Toast Derivation" is the 17th episode of the fourth season of the US sitcom The Big Bang Theory and the 80th episode of the show overall. It first aired on CBS on February 24, 2011.

The episode features a cameo appearance by LeVar Burton.

== Plot ==
Due to Leonard and Priya's relationship, the gang begins to have dinner at Raj's place instead of Leonard and Sheldon's apartment. This upsets Sheldon, who dislikes change and constantly complains when eating dinner at Raj's apartment. Sheldon goes to the Cheesecake Factory where he converses with Penny at the bar and Amy over the phone. Penny tells Sheldon that he will have to deal with hanging out at Raj's more often, and Amy agrees, claiming that Leonard is the "nucleus" of their social group and that "where he goes, the group goes".

To make Leonard jealous, Sheldon invites several of the group's acquaintances to have dinner in his apartment and sends a tweet to the actor LeVar Burton, asking him to come. After the other guests (not including Burton) have arrived, they introduce themselves, although Sheldon realizes that he does not particularly like them: Stuart came because he is in financial distress and wanted a hot shower; Barry only came because Sheldon said there would be a raffle; Zack is extremely unintelligent. Sheldon's plans are dismissed; instead, Zack tells dating stories and they sing karaoke. Sheldon eventually leaves, missing his own friends.

At Raj's apartment, the gang realise they miss Sheldon and his eccentric habits. They reminisce about previous events (such as Sheldon getting a loom). When Sheldon arrives to have dinner with them, he slowly begins to warm up to Priya after being slightly impressed with her knowledge and her cooking.

Meanwhile, Bernadette and Amy try to take Penny out dancing to get her mind off Leonard and Priya. Penny agrees to go provided that they do not pester her about it anymore, but Amy finds the snowflake Leonard gave Penny when he went to the North Pole, causing Penny's feelings for Leonard to resurface. Penny goes out anyway with the intention of having a one-night stand.

In the final scene, LeVar Burton arrives at Sheldon's apartment, but upon seeing Sheldon's guests singing "Walking on Sunshine" badly, with Stuart in a towel after having recently showered, he leaves unseen.

== Reception ==
=== Ratings ===
On the night of its first broadcast on February 24, 2011, the episode was watched by 12.35 million households in the U.S. Based on Nielsen ratings, it received a 7.4 rating/12 share, and a 3.8 rating/11 share from viewers aged between 18 and 49.

In Canada, the episode received 3.45 million viewers, placing it second in the weekly rank.

The episode was first broadcast in the UK on July 28, 2011. On E4, the episode received 0.94 million viewers (according to BARB), ranking it number 1 that week on the channel. The episode also received 0.37 million viewers on E4 +1, giving it a total of 1.31 million viewers. Overall, it ranked 11th on cable television.

=== Reviews ===
Overall, the episode received mixed reviews. Jenna Busch of IGN rated the episode 7.5/10. The TV Critic rated the episode 61 out of 100, describing the episode as "pleasant". However, Emily VanDerWerff of The A.V. Club gave the episode a C−, describing the episode as "one of the worst" of the season, and saying that the episode felt "dull" and "lifeless".
