= The Love Car Displacement =

- The Big Bang Theory episode
- Episode no.: Season 4 Episode 13
- Directed by: Anthony Rich
- Story by: Chuck Lorre, Bill Prady &; Dave Goetsch
- Teleplay by: Bill Prady, Steven Molaro &; Eric Kaplan
- Original air date: January 20, 2011

Guest appearance
- Rick Fox as Glenn

Episode chronology
← Previous "The Bus Pants Utilization"	Next → "The Thespian Catalyst"
- The Big Bang Theory season 4

"The Love Car Displacement" is an episode of the television series The Big Bang Theory that first aired on CBS on January 20, 2011. It is the thirteenth episode of the fourth season of the series and the seventy-sixth episode overall. The episode features a guest appearance by former professional basketball player Rick Fox. This is also the first episode where all seven of the main characters appear together in at least one scene.

== Plot ==
Amy asks Penny to join her and the guys on a trip to a science conference in Big Sur, California. At first, Penny declines; however, after hearing it includes spa treatment, she changes her mind. Before they get on the road, Sheldon, elected "travel supervisor" by the others after threatening to filibuster, sets up an extensive program, deciding where and when they take breaks, and seating arrangements. Amy convinces Sheldon to let Penny ride in the lead car with them and Leonard, as Penny's "Nebraska backwoods skills and brawny hands" could help if their car breaks down.

After Penny criticizes Sheldon's rules, she is made to ride with Howard, Raj and Bernadette in the other car, where Howard and Bernadette discuss their sexual plans and sing constantly, annoying the other two. At the hotel check-in, Bernadette spots Glenn, her former college professor and ex-boyfriend. Howard feels intimidated by the physically-imposing Glenn, and insecurely complains to Bernadette, accidentally implying that Glenn is too hot for her. An angered Bernadette decides to stay in Amy's and Penny's room.

Penny asks to sleep in Sheldon and Leonard's room due to Amy's nightmare post-effects: biting and scratching. Leonard accepts and the two climb into his bed together. Leonard tries to coax her into sex. During this exchange, Sheldon awakens, asking them if they are going to have sex. They both give different answers; Leonard saying yes while Penny saying no, prompting Sheldon to leave and seek shelter in Raj's room, where Raj is about to watch Bridget Jones's Diary. Sheldon eventually kicks Raj out of his room due to him waking him up with the movie, so Raj gets the key to Leonard's room where he and Penny are, at her suggestion, starting to have sex. Leonard rejects Raj's offer to watch Bridget Jones, so Raj crawls into the other bed to sleep, destroying the atmosphere for Leonard and Penny.

The next morning, Sheldon, Leonard, Howard, Raj, Bernadette, and Amy speak at the conference. After a fairly normal start, they all begin to discuss the events of last night, with Leonard upset about Raj walking in on him and Penny, and Howard and Bernadette still fighting, with Sheldon being the "normal", professional one, staying out of the bickering. To make matters worse, Raj's drunkenness starts to get the best of him and a frustrated Penny searches for someone in the audience to drive her back to Los Angeles, and leaves with Glenn, much to Leonard's dismay.

The others drive back to Pasadena in low spirits the next day. Howard and Bernadette are still not speaking, and a police car pursues Leonard as he is speeding, bothered by Penny leaving with Glenn.

== Reception ==
On the night of its first broadcast on January 20, 2011, the episode was watched by 13.63 million households. The episode was the fifth most watched episode of the season.

IGN's Jenna Busch gave the episode a mixed review stating that "the episode was really a bit cheesy" and that she "didn't like the framework". She did, however, praise several character moments including Melissa Rauch's portrayal of Bernadette saying, "Bernadette was wonderful, as always. She's just so adorable, I could see her dating Rick Fox". Busch summed up by writing "There were definitely funny moments here, but that zing was missing tonight". Jeffrey Kirkpatrick from TV Fanatic gave the episode a more positive review saying that "The brilliance of the show, as I've said before, is when Penny and Sheldon interact, but it's even striking a chord each time Penny and Amy are thrown together". Kirkpatrick also praised Kaley Cuoco as Penny, he wrote: "Kaley Cuoco is a very gifted comedienne, and her reactions to the nuttiness of the supposedly genius minds around her are always my favorite parts of every episode".
