= The Jiminy Conjecture =

- The Big Bang Theory episode
- Episode no.: Season 3 Episode 2
- Directed by: Mark Cendrowski
- Written by: Jim Reynolds
- Production code: 3X5552
- Original air date: September 28, 2009

Guest appearance
- Lewis Black as Professor Crawley

Episode chronology
← Previous "The Electric Can Opener Fluctuation"	Next → "The Gothowitz Deviation"
- The Big Bang Theory season 3

"The Jiminy Conjecture" is the second episode of the third season of the American television sitcom The Big Bang Theory. It first aired on CBS in the United States on September 28, 2009. It is the 42nd episode overall. The episode features a guest appearance by American comedian Lewis Black.

== Plot ==
Sheldon, Raj and Howard are at the comic book store and are surprised to see Leonard arrive, expecting him to be having sex with Penny. After Howard and Raj question Leonard, he characterizes their sex as "just fine" and "not bad, but not great". Later, Howard and Raj mock him about it, which causes Sheldon to explain to Penny what Leonard said. She leaves in embarrassment, with Leonard following her. He tries to justify his actions and asks her how she found the sex. When she characterizes it as "okay", they decide that discussing the problem will not make it better and decide to get very drunk before having sex. Unfortunately, they both end up constantly vomiting.

Meanwhile, Howard and Sheldon get involved in an argument about the species of a cricket they can hear from the apartment. Sheldon insists it is a snowy tree cricket while Howard maintains that it is a common field cricket. They decide to make a bet, Sheldon staking his "Flash of Two Worlds" against Howard's Fantastic Four #48. After thoroughly searching the apartment, Sheldon climbs down the elevator shaft in the hallway and his flashlight's battery runs out. Howard and Raj hear the cricket and check the stairwell, leaving Sheldon in a darkened elevator shaft.

They find the cricket and argue over a name, with Raj and Howard calling it "Toby" and Sheldon wanting to call it "Jiminy". They fail to identify the species, even with an insect guide. They settle the bet by taking the cricket to Professor Crawley, Caltech's depressed entomologist, who has just lost funding for his lab. Howard is proven correct since it is a common field cricket, much to Sheldon's disappointment.

Soon after, Sheldon talks to Penny, and he tells her that she and Leonard can always go back to being friends. When he mentions to Leonard that he spoke to Penny about their sex life, he goes over to talk to her. They decide to just be friends, but it is clear that neither really wants that and they quickly start kissing.

== Reception ==
On the night of its first broadcast on September 28, 2009, the episode was watched by 13.27 million households. Based on Nielsen ratings, the episode received an 8.0 rating/12 share. Between viewers aged between 18 and 49, it received a 5.3 rating/13 share.

The TV Critic rated the episode 58 out of 100, stating that it was "a decent episode", but also describing it as "enjoyable" and "simple". Emily VanDerWerff of The A.V. Club complimented Sheldon's carefully chosen vocabulary and the cricket storyline, she criticized the plot between Leonard and Penny. Overall, the episode was rated a B.

James Chamberlin of IGN described it as "one of The Big Bang Theory's funniest episodes", rating it 8.7 out of 10.
