= The Cruciferous Vegetable Amplification =

- The Big Bang Theory episode
- Episode no.: Season 4 Episode 2
- Directed by: Mark Cendrowski
- Story by: Bill Prady; Lee Aronsohn; Steve Holland
- Teleplay by: Chuck Lorre; Steven Molaro; Jim Reynolds
- Production code: 3X6652
- Original air date: September 30, 2010

Guest appearance
- Steve Wozniak as himself

Episode chronology
← Previous "The Robotic Manipulation"	Next → "The Zazzy Substitution"
- The Big Bang Theory season 4

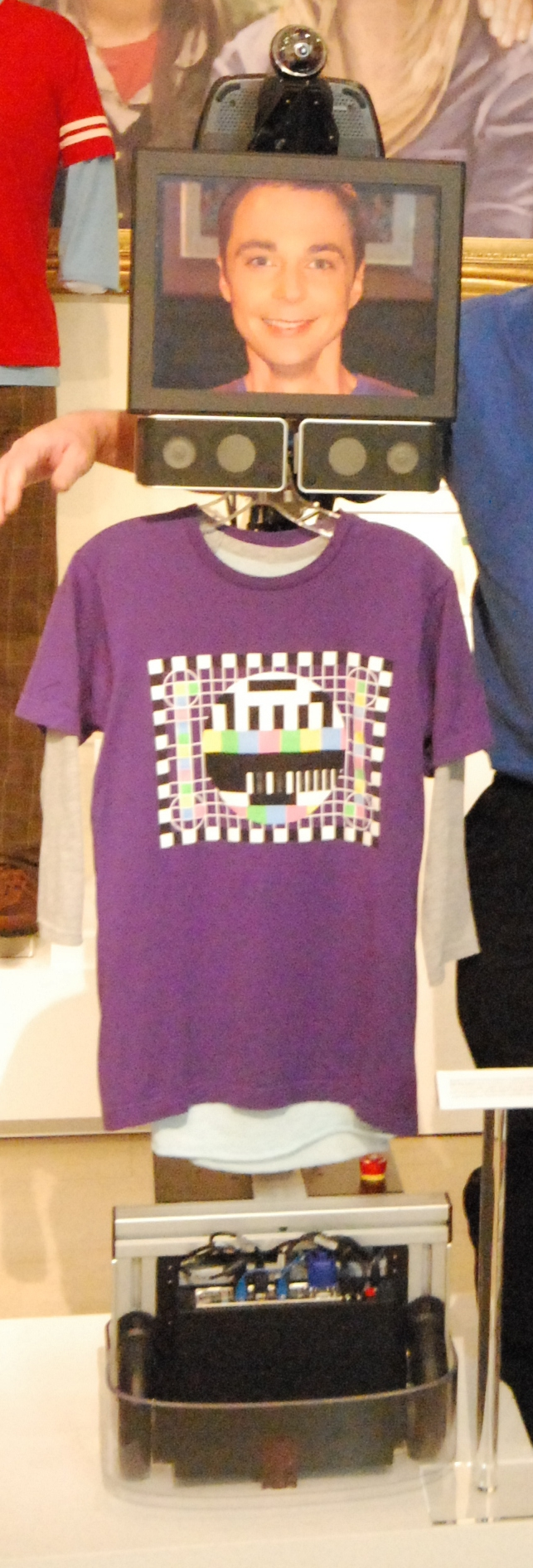
The robotic version of Sheldon from the episode.

"The Cruciferous Vegetable Amplification" is the second episode of the fourth season of The Big Bang Theory that first aired on CBS on September 30, 2010. It is the 65th episode overall. The episode features a guest appearance by Steve Wozniak, co-founder of Apple Inc.

== Plot ==
Sheldon attempts to calculate when he will die, and estimates that he has 60 years to live. He concludes that he will miss "the singularity", a point in time in which technology will be advanced enough for him to transfer his brain into a machine and achieve immortality. To extend this, he alters his diet, replacing pizza with cruciferous vegetables, beginning with Brussels sprouts. He also decides to start exercising, and after Raj points out that Penny jogs, the two decide to go jogging together.

That night, Sheldon knocks on Leonard's bedroom in distress, claiming to have cholera. Leonard dismisses this and thinks he may have appendicitis. Before they can go to the hospital, Sheldon breaks wind loudly as a result of the sprouts he had, and the two return to their beds. The next day, Sheldon meets up with Penny to go jogging and she attempts to get him to warm up. After he fails to touch his toes, she says they can warm up on the run. Sheldon jogs down the stairs and falls. When Penny tries to help him up, he farts again right in her face disgusting her and causing Sheldon to give up eating cruciferous vegetables.

As a result of his failed attempts to have a healthier lifestyle, Sheldon creates a "mobile virtual presence device": a robot (a Willow Garage Texai remote presence device) which will replace him, performing his normal tasks while controlled by Sheldon from his bedroom. Leonard tries to reason with Sheldon, who then cites Section 74C of the Roommate Agreement, which requires Leonard to assist him in the event that he becomes a robot, which irritates Leonard to no end during the next day.

At the Cheesecake Factory, the gang spot Steve Wozniak and Sheldon converses with him through the robot. Sheldon says he has a 1977 Apple II, and Wozniak says that he would sign it if he had it there. Sheldon rushes to meet him but trips and falls down the stairs again, injuring himself and breaking the Apple II. Penny is forced to sing "Soft Kitty" to Sheldon's presence device.

== Reception ==
=== Ratings ===
On the night of its first broadcast on September 30, 2010, the episode was watched by 13.06 million households in the U.S. Based on Nielsen ratings, the episode received a 7.6 rating/13 share. Between viewers aged between 18 and 49, it received a 4.4 rating/14 share. In Canada, the episode had 2.96 million viewers and a weekly rating of 1.

In the UK, the episode first aired on November 11, 2010. Watched on E4 by 0.88 million viewers and 0.26 million households on E4 +1, the episode had ranks of 1 and 6 on each channel, respectively. It had a total of 1.06 million viewers on the channels combined.

In Australia, the episode was watched by 1.18 million on October 27, 2010; it had a weekly ranking of 20. It had a nightly ranking of 5.

=== Reviews ===
The TV Critic rated the episode 56 out of 100, stating that "the story is a solid idea" but that the writers were "overloading on Sheldon jokes". Emily VanDerWerff of The A.V. Club complimented the scene in the car, saying that Parsons and Galecki's "chemistry was used to its fullest extent" and praising the inventive uses of the presence device. She gave it a B. Jenna Busch of IGN enjoyed the episode, rating it 8.5 out of 10.
