= The Big Bang Theory season 3 =

The Big Bang Theory
- Season 3
- DVD cover art
- Showrunner: Bill Prady
- Starring: Johnny Galecki; Jim Parsons; Kaley Cuoco; Simon Helberg; Kunal Nayyar
- No. of episodes: 23

Release
- Original network: CBS
- Original release: September 21, 2009 – May 24, 2010

Season chronology
- ← Previous; Season 2 Next → Season 4

The third season of the American television sitcom The Big Bang Theory aired on CBS from September 21, 2009 to May 24, 2010.

It received higher ratings than the previous two seasons with over 15 million viewers. The third season saw the first appearances of future main cast members Melissa Rauch and Mayim Bialik as Bernadette Rostenkowski and Dr. Amy Farrah Fowler respectively.

Christine Baranski was nominated for the Primetime Emmy Award for Outstanding Guest Actress in a Comedy Series at the 62nd Primetime Emmy Awards for the episode, "The Maternal Congruence". Jim Parsons won the Primetime Emmy Award for Outstanding Lead Actor in a Comedy Series for the episode "The Pants Alternative".

== Production ==
In March 2009, the series received a renewal for a third and fourth season through the 2010–11 television season.

== Cast ==
=== Main cast ===
- Johnny Galecki as Leonard Hofstadter
- Jim Parsons as Sheldon Cooper
- Kaley Cuoco as Penny
- Simon Helberg as Howard Wolowitz
- Kunal Nayyar as Rajesh Ramayan Koothrappali

=== Recurring cast ===
- Laurie Metcalf as Mary Cooper
- Carol Ann Susi as Mrs. Wolowitz
- John Ross Bowie as Dr. Barry Kripke
- Wil Wheaton as himself
- Kevin Sussman as Stuart Bloom
- Melissa Rauch as Bernadette Rostenkowski
- Brian George as Dr. V.M. Koothrappali
- Alice Amter as Mrs. Koothrappali
- Christine Baranski as Dr. Beverly Hofstadter
- Sara Gilbert as Leslie Winkle
- Brian Thomas Smith as Zack Johnson

=== Guest cast ===
- Lewis Black as Professor Crawley
- Molly Morgan as Bethany
- Sarah Buehler as Sarah
- Andy Mackenzie as Skeeter
- Elizabeth Bogush as Dr. Catherine Millstone
- Oliver Muirhead as Professor Laughlin
- Zachary Abel as Todd
- Jason Mesches as Denny
- Danica McKellar as Abby
- Jen Drohan as Martha
- Julio Oscar Mechoso as Officer Hackett
- Yeardley Smith as Sandy
- Kevin Brief as Glenn
- Steve Paymer as Judge Kirby
- Marcus Folmar as Guard
- Frank Maharajh as Venkatesh Koothrappali
- Judy Greer as Dr. Elizabeth Plimpton
- Ally Maki as Joyce Kim
- Steven Yeun as Sebastian
- Ajgie Kirkland as Louie/Louise
- Lauri Johnson as Mrs. Gunderson
- Mayim Bialik as Dr. Amy Farrah Fowler

=== Special guest cast ===
- Katee Sackhoff as herself
- Ira Flatow as himself
- Stan Lee as himself

== Episodes ==
No. overall	No. in season	Title	Directed by	Written by	Original release date	Prod. code	U.S. viewers (millions)
41	1	"The Electric Can Opener Fluctuation"	Mark Cendrowski	Story by : Bill Prady, Lee Aronsohn & Steve Holland; Teleplay by : Chuck Lorre, Jim Reynolds & Steven Molaro	September 21, 2009	3X5551	12.96
When Sheldon learns the guys tampered with his expedition data he got from the arctic, he leaves to Texas in disgrace. This results in the guys following him, which threatens Leonard's hope for some romantic time with Penny and the guys' friendship with Sheldon.
42	2	"The Jiminy Conjecture"	Mark Cendrowski	Jim Reynolds	September 28, 2009	3X5552	13.27
Leonard and Penny vacillate between friendship and a romantic relationship, struggling to resolve the awkwardness. In an attempt to feel comfortable and talk about a solution, they end up getting drunk in her apartment and throwing up all night. Sheldon and Howard stake their most valuable comic books on a bet over the species of a cricket they hear, enlisting a depressed entomologist to settle the bet. After Sheldon loses the bet, he meets Penny and after talking to her about Leonard, assures her that she and Leonard can always go back to being friends. After she explains this to Leonard, the two agree to do so, but they find that neither wants to and have sex again.
43	3	"The Gothowitz Deviation"	Mark Cendrowski	Story by : Lee Aronsohn & Richard Rosenstock; Teleplay by : Bill Prady & Maria Ferrari	October 5, 2009	3X5553	12.52
Penny's bed in her apartment breaks, forcing her to sleep at Leonard and Sheldon's apartment for a few days. Sheldon tries to condition Penny, rewarding with chocolate what he considers to be "correct" behavior. Howard and Raj pretend to be goths to try to meet girls at a goth club, but chicken out when the girls persuade them to get tattoos.
44	4	"The Pirate Solution"	Mark Cendrowski	Steve Holland	October 12, 2009	3X5554	13.07
Raj's research on trans-Neptunian objects comes to a dead end and he faces deportation to India unless he gets a new job. Sheldon offers Raj a chance to work for him. Raj accepts but disagreements ensue. Eventually, Sheldon apologizes to Raj, conceding that his theory is correct but refusing to give up on his own. Howard tries to hang out with Leonard and Penny, but intrudes into their relationship.
45	5	"The Creepy Candy Coating Corollary"	Mark Cendrowski	Story by : Chuck Lorre & Bill Prady; Teleplay by : Lee Aronsohn & Steven Molaro	October 19, 2009	3X5556	13.47
Howard reminds Leonard of their girlfriend pact: one of the two men (Leonard) who has a girlfriend (Penny) must have her set the other man (Howard) up on a date with her friend. After prodding by Leonard, a reluctant Penny sets up Howard with her friend Bernadette, though they find they have little in common. However, the two bond over their respective relationships with their mothers. Sheldon enters a collectible card game tournament, with Raj as his partner, to compete against his rival Wil Wheaton, who inadvertently humiliated Sheldon when he was a child.
46	6	"The Cornhusker Vortex"	Mark Cendrowski	Story by : Bill Prady & Steven Molaro; Teleplay by : Dave Goetsch & Richard Rosenstock	November 2, 2009	3X5555	12.73
Leonard attempts to fit in with Penny's football-loving friends, despite initially knowing nothing about the game. However, it is Sheldon who surprises him with a large amount of football knowledge (forced on him by his father in his childhood), which Leonard later brings to Penny's football party. When Leonard refuses to fly kites with Sheldon, upsetting him as he never got to experience a normal childhood, Penny feels bad and allows Leonard to go, especially after pointing out how he is boring everyone at the party. Howard upsets Raj by repeatedly abandoning him during activities to pursue women.
47	7	"The Guitarist Amplification"	Mark Cendrowski	Story by : Chuck Lorre & Lee Aronsohn; Teleplay by : Bill Prady & Richard Rosenstock & Jim Reynolds	November 9, 2009	3X5557	12.80
When Penny announces that her guitarist friend, whom she dated twice, is going to sleep on her couch for the next few days, Leonard is upset that she did not ask him first. Sheldon is upset by reminders of his quarreling parents as Leonard and Penny fight, Raj argues with his parents and Howard argues with his mother.
48	8	"The Adhesive Duck Deficiency"	Mark Cendrowski	Story by : Chuck Lorre & Bill Prady & Dave Goetsch; Teleplay by : Steven Molaro & Eric Kaplan & Maria Ferrari	November 16, 2009	3X5558	13.23
Sheldon, despite never having driven a car before, is forced to drive Penny to the hospital after she slips in the shower. Leonard, Raj and Howard go on a camping trip to watch the Leonid meteor shower, but all succumb to the effects of "magic" cookies given to them by Deadhead campers nearby, causing them to blurt out weird secrets including Howard losing his virginity to his second cousin and they forget about the meteor shower.
49	9	"The Vengeance Formulation"	Mark Cendrowski	Story by : Chuck Lorre & Maria Ferrari; Teleplay by : Richard Rosenstock & Jim Reynolds & Steve Holland	November 23, 2009	3X5559	14.13
After three successful dates, Howard reflects on the future of his relationship with Bernadette. He surprises her with a last-minute proposal, which she declines as it is much too soon for either of them. However, he wins her over by performing a cheesy love song, which she finds romantic. A prank fight between Sheldon and Kripke begins when the latter severely embarrasses the former on National Public Radio's talk show Science Friday by filling Sheldon's office with helium, giving him a high-pitched voice. It ends with Sheldon dropping foam from the ceiling into Kripke's office, but accidentally does it when President Siebert and the Board of Directors are there to see Kripke's progress on one of his experiments. Afterwards, a pre-recorded message from Sheldon plays from Kripke's computer, explaining that Sheldon was responsible and that Leonard and Raj were involved.
50	10	"The Gorilla Experiment"	Mark Cendrowski	Story by : Chuck Lorre & Richard Rosenstock & Steve Holland; Teleplay by : Bill Prady & Steven Molaro & Maria Ferrari	December 7, 2009	3X5560	14.38
Howard becomes jealous of Leonard after Bernadette shows an interest in his work, causing friction in the relationship of all three. Penny becomes jealous over not being able to talk to Leonard about his job, and asks Sheldon to teach her about physics to mixed results.
51	11	"The Maternal Congruence"	Mark Cendrowski	Story by : Lee Aronsohn & Steven Molaro & Richard Rosenstock & Maria Ferrari; Teleplay by : Chuck Lorre & Bill Prady & Dave Goetsch	December 14, 2009	3X5562	15.58
At Christmas, Leonard's mother visits, much to Leonard's horror and Sheldon's delight. Penny is upset to learn that Leonard has not told her about his mother's visit, nor his mother about their relationship, while Leonard learns that Sheldon appears to know more about his parents' lives than he does. Beverly then suggests Howard and Raj to confess their homosexual feelings to each other, while Leonard joins in on the fun. Leonard gets upset when he learns that Beverly divorced his father and his dog, Mitzy, died. While driving Beverly to her hotel, Penny gets drunk with her and reveals that she is dating Leonard. Beverly confronts Leonard about communication issues and kisses Sheldon while being drunk in front of Penny, though they all agreed not to talk about it with Leonard.
52	12	"The Psychic Vortex"	Mark Cendrowski	Story by : Lee Aronsohn & Steven Molaro; Teleplay by : Chuck Lorre & Eric Kaplan & Jim Reynolds	January 11, 2010	3X5561	15.82
Penny is upset when Leonard derides her for taking advice from a psychic. Awkward situations ensue as Sheldon and Raj date two women they met at a university mixer, Raj having bribed Sheldon to be his wingman.
53	13	"The Bozeman Reaction"	Mark Cendrowski	Story by : Bill Prady & Lee Aronsohn & Jim Reynolds; Teleplay by : Chuck Lorre & Steven Molaro & Steve Holland	January 18, 2010	3X5563	15.05
Sheldon fears for his safety after his and Leonard's apartment is burgled, and takes various measures to try to increase his security.
54	14	"The Einstein Approximation"	Mark Cendrowski	Story by : Lee Aronsohn & Dave Goetsch & Steve Holland; Teleplay by : Chuck Lorre & Steven Molaro & Eric Kaplan	February 1, 2010	3X5565	15.51
After becoming obsessed with a physics problem, Sheldon decides to take a menial job, comparing himself to Albert Einstein, who conceived his theory of relativity while working at the Swiss patent office. Meanwhile, Raj feels left out when Leonard, Penny, Howard and Bernadette go on a double-date at a roller skating rink. Guest Star: Yeardley Smith as Sandy.
55	15	"The Large Hadron Collision"	Mark Cendrowski	Story by : Chuck Lorre & Steven Molaro & Jim Reynolds; Teleplay by : Lee Aronsohn & Richard Rosenstock & Maria Ferrari	February 8, 2010	3X5564	16.26
When Leonard gets two tickets to a conference in Switzerland to visit the Large Hadron Collider, Sheldon becomes dismayed when Leonard plans to take Penny instead of him for a Valentine's Day skiing trip. After failing to convince Leonard to change his mind, Sheldon tries to convince Penny to drop out, which leads Leonard to terminate his friendship with Sheldon. However, when Penny has caught the flu, Leonard changes his mind and allows Sheldon to go, only to find out he is sick as well, causing him to take Raj. It is later revealed that Sheldon caught it from Penny when he hugged her.
56	16	"The Excelsior Acquisition"	Peter Chakos	Story by : Chuck Lorre & Lee Aronsohn & Steven Molaro; Teleplay by : Bill Prady & Steve Holland & Maria Ferrari	March 1, 2010	3X5566	15.73
Sheldon tries to meet Stan Lee at a comic book signing, but is stymied by having to appear in court for driving too slow and running a red light while taking Penny to the hospital in the episode "The Adhesive Duck Deficiency", and enlists Penny to help him win the judge's favor.
57	17	"The Precious Fragmentation"	Mark Cendrowski	Story by : Lee Aronsohn & Eric Kaplan & Maria Ferrari; Teleplay by : Bill Prady & Steven Molaro & Richard Rosenstock	March 8, 2010	3X5567	16.32
Sheldon, Raj, Leonard and Howard acquire a collectible casting of the One Ring, which turns out to be a prop from The Lord of the Rings film trilogy. The group is conflicted on what to do: Leonard wants to send it back to Peter Jackson, Raj wants to sell it and use the profits to buy a jet ski, and both Howard and Sheldon want to keep it for themselves. Leonard gives it to Penny for safekeeping, but Sheldon attempts to steal it while she sleeps and she punches him in the nose. The fight escalates at lunch at the university when all of the guys grab the ring and begin a holding contest, with the last one holding on the keeper of the ring. They somehow walk out the door of the university, get in a car and drive home. Leonard drops out when Penny tempts him with sex. The remaining three try several mind tricks on each other to give up the ring such as attacking their mothers or trying to make the other go pee, which works and Sheldon and Howard have to somehow urinate without letting go of the ring. In the end, the guys fall asleep on the couch, with no one holding the ring. When they wake up, Leonard tells them he sent it back to Peter Jackson and berates them for their childish behavior and that they would take the ring over having friends, since most likely whoever got the ring would have been made an outcast by the others. However, it is revealed Leonard secretly pocketed the ring, and it is being kept in a shoe box in his room. Sheldon attempts to steal it again while Penny and Leonard are sleeping, but Sheldon and Leonard get into another argument making Penny leave the apartment.
58	18	"The Pants Alternative"	Mark Cendrowski	Story by : Chuck Lorre & Bill Prady & Steve Holland; Teleplay by : Eric Kaplan & Richard Rosenstock & Jim Reynolds	March 22, 2010	3X5568	13.42
The characters try to help Sheldon overcome his fear of public speaking in time for him to accept a science award. He is still nervous until Penny gets him drunk at the award ceremony, causing him to spiral into a meltdown on stage which included singing Tom Lehrer's 1959 song "The Elements" and mooning the attendees. The video quickly goes viral, and Sheldon, hungover and having no memory of his speech, watches it the next morning.
59	19	"The Wheaton Recurrence"	Mark Cendrowski	Story by : Chuck Lorre & Steven Molaro & Nicole Lorre & Jessica Ambrosetti; Teleplay by : Bill Prady & Dave Goetsch & Jim Reynolds & Maria Ferrari	April 12, 2010	3X5569	13.39
Leonard and Penny reflect on their relationship after Penny does not reciprocate when Leonard tells her he loves her. At a bowling match with Stuart and others, including Sheldon's rival Wil Wheaton, the two question their future together, but Wheaton may also be interfering.
60	20	"The Spaghetti Catalyst"	Anthony Rich	Chuck Lorre & Bill Prady & Lee Aronsohn & Steven Molaro	May 3, 2010	3X5570	11.63
Sheldon tries to maintain his friendships with Leonard and Penny, now that they have broken up, as they consider whether they can still be friends with each other.
61	21	"The Plimpton Stimulation"	Mark Cendrowski	Story by : Chuck Lorre & Bill Prady & Lee Aronsohn; Teleplay by : Steven Molaro & Jim Reynolds & Maria Ferrari	May 10, 2010	3X5571	13.73
Dr. Elizabeth Plimpton, a cosmological physicist from Princeton University, accepts Sheldon's invitation to stay over at the apartment during her visit to Caltech. However, she instead takes an immediate interest in Leonard, and the two end up sleeping together, inciting jealousy from Penny. However, it quickly becomes clear that Leonard and Elizabeth both have very different ideas about the nature of their relationship, when she sleeps with Raj and tries to convince Leonard and Howard (who has just broken up with Bernadette) to engage in a foursome with them.
62	22	"The Staircase Implementation"	Mark Cendrowski	Story by : Lee Aronsohn & Steven Molaro & Steve Holland; Teleplay by : Chuck Lorre & Dave Goetsch & Maria Ferrari	May 17, 2010	3X5572	15.02
After Leonard and Sheldon have a fight about the thermostat temperature, the former takes shelter in Penny’s apartment. While he is there, he talks about how he originally met Sheldon in 2003. Leonard saw an ad about the offer of being a roommate to someone and took it because of its reasonable rent, but is warned by other tenants of Sheldon’s eccentricity. After passing some trials and signing to the Roommate Agreement, Leonard moves in. He clashes with Sheldon after he interrupts sex with a girl Leonard brought home and is constantly frustrated by his behavior. He invites his friends, Howard and Raj, to come use some genuine rocket fuel (that he had after working on a top secret government project) to power a model Howard brought, but Sheldon consistently warns him he got the formula wrong to convert the rocket fuel into something able to be used for the model. Leonard ignores Sheldon’s warnings and continues with the formula, but it begins smoking and they try to take it outside via the elevator, but Sheldon grabs the formula and pushes Leonard out of it moments before the rocket fuel explodes, destroying the elevator and revealing why it is always out of order. After the story, Penny convinces Leonard to reconcile with Sheldon, and the former does go over back to the apartment to apologize, but inevitably another argument arises when Leonard tries to watch Babylon 5, a show Sheldon dislikes.
63	23	"The Lunar Excitation"	Peter Chakos	Story by : Chuck Lorre & Bill Prady & Maria Ferrari; Teleplay by : Lee Aronsohn & Steven Molaro & Steve Holland	May 24, 2010	3X5573	15.02
Penny introduces her new boyfriend Zack to the other characters as they set up an experiment to bounce a laser off the moon using one of the laser reflectors left by the Apollo program, but grows disappointed with him as she watches him interact with the group. She later breaks up with him and drunkenly rants at Leonard for ruining her ability to tolerate idiots before proceeding to engage in sex with him, leading Leonard to hypothesize that he too can initiate drunken sex, which he tests twice within the episode, first being Leslie Winkle, to which she closes the door in his face. The second towards Penny in parallel drunken stupor to how she behaved prior, only to be pushed out of her doorway. Meanwhile, Raj and Howard create a profile for Sheldon on a dating website without his knowledge, which to their surprise matches him with a woman named Amy Farrah Fowler. The two force Sheldon to meet Amy, and are surprised when Sheldon and Amy have a lot in common, ranging from their aversion to soiled hosiery, to their overbearing mothers.

== Ratings ==
Viewership and ratings per episode of The Big Bang Theory season 3
No.	Title	Air date	Rating/share (18–49)	Viewers (millions)
1	"The Electric Can Opener Fluctuation"	September 21, 2009	4.7/11	12.96
2	"The Jiminy Conjecture"	September 28, 2009	5.3/13	13.27
3	"The Gothowitz Deviation"	October 5, 2009	4.5/10	12.52
4	"The Pirate Solution"	October 12, 2009	5.0/12	13.07
5	"The Creepy Candy Coating Corollary"	October 19, 2009	5.3/13	13.47
6	"The Cornhusker Vortex"	November 2, 2009	4.7/11	12.73
7	"The Guitarist Amplification"	November 9, 2009	4.7/11	12.79
8	"The Adhesive Duck Deficiency"	November 16, 2009	5.0/12	13.23
9	"The Vengeance Formulation"	November 23, 2009	5.2/13	14.13
10	"The Gorilla Experiment"	December 7, 2009	5.6/13	14.38
11	"The Maternal Congruence"	December 14, 2009	5.6/14	15.58
12	"The Psychic Vortex"	January 11, 2010	5.7/14	15.82
13	"The Bozeman Reaction"	January 18, 2010	5.2/12	14.99
14	"The Einstein Approximation"	February 1, 2010	5.4/13	15.51
15	"The Large Hadron Collision"	February 8, 2010	6.0/14	16.26
16	"The Excelsior Acquisition"	March 1, 2010	5.9/14	15.73
17	"The Precious Fragmentation"	March 8, 2010	5.9/15	16.32
18	"The Pants Alternative"	March 22, 2010	5.2/13	13.42
19	"The Wheaton Recurrence"	April 12, 2010	5.1/13	13.39
20	"The Spaghetti Catalyst"	May 3, 2010	4.6/12	11.63
21	"The Plimpton Stimulation"	May 10, 2010	5.3/13	13.73
22	"The Staircase Implementation"	May 17, 2010	5.5/14	15.02
23	"The Lunar Excitation"	May 24, 2010	5.2/13	14.78

== Reception ==
The third season received critical acclaim. Maureen Ryan of Chicago Tribune who wrote that "Big Bang Theory, which is in its third season, is doing many things very right", Alan Sepinwall of The Star-Ledger wrote "the Penny/Sheldon interaction was gold, as always", and Ken Tucker of Entertainment Weekly, who wrote that "what lifts The Big Bang Theory into frequent excellence is its one constant from the start: the brilliantly nuanced performance of Jim Parsons".

The American Film Institute ranked season three one of the ten best television seasons of 2009.
