= Arliss (TV series) =

American television series

- Series DVD cover
- Genre: Comedy; Sports
- Created by: Robert Wuhl
- Starring: Robert Wuhl; Sandra Oh; Jim Turner; Michael Boatman
- Opening theme: "I Can't Help Myself" by The Four Tops (season 1); "I Only Want to Be with You" by Dusty Springfield (seasons 2–7)
- Composer: Ed Smart
- Country of origin: United States
- Original language: English
- No. of seasons: 7
- No. of episodes: 80 (list of episodes)

Production
- Camera setup: Single-camera
- Running time: 30 minutes
- Production companies: Tollin/Robbins Productions (1996–1998); Marquee/Tollin/Robbins (1998–2002)

Original release
- Network: HBO
- Release: August 10, 1996 – September 8, 2002

Arliss (rendered in its logo as Arli$$) is an American dark comedy series, created by and starring Robert Wuhl (who was also the series' showrunner), about the glitzy, big-money world of professional sports, with Wuhl playing the eternally optimistic and endlessly resourceful L.A. sports agent Arliss Michaels, whose Achilles' heel is his inability to say "no" to clients and employees. Arliss ran for seven seasons and 80 episodes on HBO, from August 10, 1996, to September 8, 2002. After almost two decades off the air, the entire catalog of Arliss episodes returned to Max in a streaming format in 2022.

The New York Times called the show "One of the freshest shows to come along in a while." It was well known for taking on very controversial (at the time) topics, including point shaving, political corruption, personal seat license fees, relocation of professional sports teams, sports in the Las Vegas metropolitan area, right to work law states, domestic abuse, steroid use, Alzheimer's disease, gay and transgender athletes, alcoholism, and unwanted athlete pregnancies.

The idea behind Arliss was to show the hype, greed, and hypocrisy of powerful sports agents like Arliss Michaels, and what really happens "behind the scenes" in professional sports. In a 2018 interview with The Hollywood Reporter, Wuhl said the idea for Arliss was based on the book The Art of the Deal by Donald Trump and journalist Tony Schwartz:

I had read The Art of the Deal and I thought, "This is total, 100 percent bullshit. He's saying stuff that I don't believe a fuckin' word of it. He's telling you what happened, but I want to see what really happened." We can use this, as Arliss the sports agent, telling you what happens and then prove he's full of shit and show what really happened.

Over 400 celebrities had cameo appearances on Arliss, including Les Moonves, George Wallace, Bobcat Goldthwait, Shannon Elizabeth, Fred Williamson, Al Michaels, John Elway, Derek Jeter, Dan Marino, Kobe Bryant, Shaquille O'Neal, Warren Moon, Alonzo Mourning, Bob Costas, Jimmy Johnson, Jerry Jones, Picabo Street, Katarina Witt, and Barry Bonds.

== Cast ==
- Robert Wuhl as Arliss Michaels, the president of a sports agency, who tries to cater to his clients' every need as best as he can. He still manages a lucrative career, negotiating big contracts and rubbing shoulders with superstar athletes, and often becoming embroiled in their messy personal lives. He's competitive, never to be underestimated, and always looking to expand the roster.
- Sandra Oh as Rita Wu, Arliss's personal assistant and woman in world sports. She is gutsy, devoted and whip-smart. She goes beyond the call of duty, personally and professionally, and always maintains high standards.
- Jim Turner as Kirby Carlisle, a middle-aged ex-football star who forges a new career as a sports agent, albeit with a serious gambling addiction. He isn't always as strategic as Arliss, but the junior partner's blunt thinking can come in handy.
- Michael Boatman as Stanley Babson, a conservative financial advisor as the voice of reason in the conference room, and begrudging co-conspirator to Arliss's screwball schemes. He makes sure the cash keeps flowing to management for Arliss.

== Series overview ==
Season	Episodes	Originally released	
Season	Episodes	First released	Last released
1	11	August 10, 1996	October 16, 1996
2	10	June 17, 1997	August 19, 1997
3	13	June 7, 1998	August 30, 1998
4	12	June 6, 1999	August 22, 1999
5	13	June 4, 2000	September 3, 2000
6	10	June 10, 2001	August 12, 2001
7	11	June 16, 2002	September 8, 2002

== Critical reception ==
Arliss has a 74/100 rating on Metacritic, and 69% on Rotten Tomatoes. The popular show, which ran for seven seasons, has been cited as a "blueprint" for future HBO shows such as Ballers and Entourage, and as an example of how premium cable networks manage their programming. A number of HBO subscribers cited Arliss as the sole reason that they paid for the network, and as a result, its fan base was able to keep the show on the air for a lengthy run. The show frequently used obscure sports references, and Entertainment Weekly repeatedly called it one of the worst shows on television; sportswriter Bill Simmons (who later worked for HBO under his digital banner The Ringer) used Arliss as an example of what he saw as a lack of good fictional shows about sports.
