= List of Arliss episodes =

Arliss is a cable television series that aired on HBO.

== Series overview ==
Season	Episodes	Originally released	
Season	Episodes	First released	Last released
1	11	August 10, 1996	October 16, 1996
2	10	June 17, 1997	August 19, 1997
3	13	June 7, 1998	August 30, 1998
4	12	June 6, 1999	August 22, 1999
5	13	June 4, 2000	September 3, 2000
6	10	June 10, 2001	August 12, 2001
7	11	June 16, 2002	September 8, 2002

== Episodes ==
=== Season 1 (1996) ===
No. overall	No. in season	Title	Directed by	Written by	Original release date	Prod. code
1	1	"A Man of Our Times"	Andy Wolk	Robert Wuhl	August 10, 1996	Pilot
While being nominated for the civic honor "Man of Our Times," Arliss must juggle one client's plans for a same-sex marriage on the opening night of a huge ice-skating tour, Kirby's gambling habit, and another client's financial ruin and impending unemployment. Guests: Bob Costas, Jerry Jones, Elizabeth Manley, Ann Meyers-Drysdale, Shaquille O'Neal, Jim Palmer, Danny Tartabull
2	2	"Negotiating: It's Never Personal"	Nick Marck	Robert Wuhl	August 14, 1996	101
When high-school hoops sensation Shaler Halimon announces he'll skip college and jump straight to the NBA, Arliss positions himself as Shaler's agent and uses the opportunity to settle a score with team owner Buddy Reingold. Guests: Brent Barry, John Franco, Hannah Storm
3	3	"Athletes Are Role Models"	Tucker Gates	Kevin Falls	August 21, 1996	102
Temptation gets the better of squeaky-clean QB Dan Hendricks. Arliss battles with a client's desire to confess his sins to the world, while keeping the suspicious media and a scorned wife at bay. Guests: Al Michaels, Warren Moon
4	4	"How to Turn a Minus Into a Plus"	Nick Marck	Robert Wuhl	August 28, 1996	103
AMM client and boxing champ Sucre Rey Santos finally gives in and grants top contender Cohones Ochonez a title fight. The huge payday means Arliss can finally buy that Gulfstream Jet he's had his eyes on. But when Ochonez is arrested and tossed in jail, the fight is no mas. However, Arliss gets the governor to sign off and approve the fight, allowing HBO to televise the Battle in the Bighouse, live from the state penitentiary. Guests: Al Bernstein, Bobcat Goldthwait, Jim Lampley, Chris Myers
5	5	"What About the Fans?"	Mary Kay Place	Joan Ackermann	September 4, 1996	104
L.A. Kings owner Flora Lansing dangles part-ownership in front of Arliss if he can find a new home for her hockey team--provided there's a new stadium, complete with luxury boxes and PSLs. But this must be kept a secret! So Arliss shops the team to three prospective homes: Raleigh-Durham, Las Vegas and Mexico City. Guests: Kobe Bryant, Jim Hill, Nick Kypreos, Stella Stevens
6	6	"The Company You Keep"	Mary Kay Place	Joan Ackermann	September 11, 1996	105
Mike Armstrong, president of multinational CSM, is interested in buying AMM. Arliss never dreamed of selling until he hears what Armstrong's paying. AMM staffers, particularly Kirby, Rita and Stanley, know their boss is up to something and begin to worry about their job security. Guests: Barry Bonds, Alex Karras
7	7	"Colors of the Rainbow"	Rodman Flender	Jon Hayman	September 18, 1996	106
A reporter overhears Arliss talking about the South Street Jaboos, a rival stickball team from his old neighborhood, and interprets this as a racial slur. A media siege begins and Arliss is under fire. Meanwhile, free-agent relief pitcher and white supremacist Trevor Heath decides to let Arliss represent him upon hearing the comments. Guests: Ricky Bottalico, Will Clark, Roy Firestone, Mike Lieberthal, Dennis Miller, Nate Newton, Conan O'Brien, Charley Steiner, Fred "The Hammer" Williamson
8	8	"Crossing the Line"	Robert Wuhl	Joan Ackermann	September 25, 1996	107
Why would Arliss even consider representing Anya Slovachek (Shannon Elizabeth), the 186th ranked woman tennis player whose father is a psychotic maniac? Well, when he sees Anya with his own eyes, Arliss' mind is made up for him. Guests: Tracy Austin, Joe Carter, Bud Collins, John McEnroe, Alonzo Mourning, Stella Sampras, Dweezil Zappa
9	9	"Timing Is Everything"	Jace Alexander	Kevin Falls	October 2, 1996	108
Arliss and Kirby decide to take beach volleyball to the next level by creating a new made-for-TV indoor tour with high-level glitz, oiled bodies, fluorescent sand and heavy promotion. But everything goes afoul as the tour's top women's pair have irreconcilable differences, and one of the top guys infects his toe on a petrified kelp pod. Guests: Cecil Fielder, Liz Masakayan, Les Moonves
10	10	"The Client's Best Interest"	Mike Tollin	Roger Director	October 9, 1996	109
In the 12th annual Den of Thieves Rotisserie Baseball League, Arliss and Kirby hope their Frozen Ropes can bring the title back where it belongs, away from cosmetic surgeon Vic Freed and his hated Silicone Valley. Arliss must resolve a conflict of interest between the good of the Frozen Ropes, and the good of AMM client and Phillies ace Ned Bastille. Guests: Jim Fregosi, Peter Gammons, Steve Garvey, Pete Incaviglia, Gregg Jeffries, Beverly Johnson, Barry Larkin, Tommy Lasorda, Leo Mazzone, Joe Pantoliano, Mayor Edward G. Rendell, Robert Shapiro, Gary Sheffield, Jonathan Silverman, Brandon Tartikoff
11	11	"The Stuff That Dreams Are Made Of"	Peter Baldwin	Andy Munsey	October 16, 1996	110
As a kid, Arliss idolized Hall of Fame outfielder Rocky Framaggio so much that he still carries around the Rock's rookie card. And now, after a chance meeting at the racetrack, Arliss decides to help the downtrodden Rock make some scratch and get back on his feet. But after the Rock strikes out at three job attempts, Arliss comes up with a stroke of marketing genius. Guests: Ken Howard, Phil Rizzuto, Dick Stockton

=== Season 2 (1997) ===
No. overall	No. in season	Title	Directed by	Written by	Original release date	Prod. code
12	1	"A Full-Service Agency"	Eugene Corr	Kevin Falls	June 17, 1997	201
Catcher Zack Bowers can barely get the ball back to the mound, let alone to second base. The source of his problems? He suspects his wife is unfaithful and convinces Arliss he must uncover the truth. Guests: Michael Andretti, Desmond Howard, Tim McCarver, Bruce Smith
13	2	"The Value of Loyalty"	Rodman Flender	Joan Ackermann	June 24, 1997	202
One of Arliss' long-term friends and clients leaves him when his fiancee declares it's time for a "fresh start." Meanwhile, Rita is dating a client and Arliss wants it to stop, or else. Guests: Carmen Policy, Bill Walsh
14	3	"Arliss Michaels, American"	John Payson	Norman Chad	July 1, 1997	203
Arliss is invited to dinner at the White House and he can't decide whom to invite as his escort. But that becomes the least of his worries when his bowling champion client, the controversial Turkey Reeves, gets in trouble with the law. Guests: James Carville, Jack Howell, Jim Leyritz, Tim Salmon, Katarina Witt
15	4	"The World at Your Feet"	Peter Baldwin	Andy Munsey	July 8, 1997	204
Kahoutec "Comet" Evans is a can't-miss tennis phenom whom Arliss discovered years ago when the boy stood as tall as his racket. Now that Comet has come of age, Arliss must juggle the boy's mother's wish for her son to go to college with his own wish to cash in on the young superstar's talents. Guests: Tom Lasorda
16	5	"Salary Cap This!"	John Payson	Scott Kaufer	July 15, 1997	205
Sports Illustrated is planning an article about sports agents, and will select one to grace the magazine's cover. Despite some early maneuvering, Arliss thinks he's out of the running. But "the working man's friend" puts on his best moves in OT when he risks his own life to save client Damian Niles, in the process displaying a brilliant grasp of NBA salary capology. Guests: Bob Arum, David Falk, Ernie Johnson, Jr., Floyd Mayweather, Jerry West
17	6	"Kirby Carlisle, Trouble-Shooter"	Rodman Flender	Kevin Falls	July 22, 1997	206
When Arliss throws out his back, his dream of playing in the Crosby Pro-Am with golf client Ryan Mason III is shattered. Enter Kirby Carlisle, Arliss' Man Friday. Kirby steps in to partner with Mason, and assist the pro with his club selection. Guests: Norm Crosby, Gary McCord, Jim Nantz, Dwayne Schintzius
18	7	"The Real Thing"	Tim Marx	Barry Gold	July 29, 1997	207
AMM client Dan Manville is closing in on his 500th home run. Add that to the 500 stolen bases he's already chalked up, and he's the charter member of the 500/500 club. Arliss has everything in position for the "500/500 Experience," a huge Manville memorabilia tour on wheels, coming to a mall near you. All that's left is for Manville to hit his 500th dinger--and for Arliss to get the ball. Guests: Hank Aaron, Roger Clemens, Cortez Kennedy, Larry King, Jon Miller, Frank Robinson, Ozzie Smith
19	8	"Visionary for a New Millennium"	Ellen S. Pressman	Joan Ackermann	August 5, 1997	208
Arliss is dazzled by marketing whiz Giselle Jaynes. She's charming, clever and sexy, and she's filled with brilliant, cutting-edge ideas for AMM clients -- despite knowing nothing about the sports world. Guests: Alexi Lalas, Jim Lampley, Orlando Pace
20	9	"How to Be a Good Listener"	John Fortenberry	Scott Kaufer	August 12, 1997	209
It's a day from hell for Arliss Michaels: Stanley is considering leaving AMM, while client Sammy Stilton is about to be suspended for "assaulting" an umpire. All this as Arliss tries to get to the airport for a top-priority "secret meeting." Guests: Chris Berman, Donald Fehr, Brett Favre, Lisa Leslie, Ted Turner
21	10	"The Truth and Responsibility"	Peter Baldwin	Kevin Falls	August 19, 1997	210
Arliss manages to get Kirby some airtime as a sports talk-radio host. What better way to promote his own clientele--especially Yoshi Kobiashi, the latest pitching phenom nobody's ever seen. Before you know it, Kirby starts to rule the airwaves and a star is born--and a huge deal for Arliss may be on the rocks. Guests: Barry Bonds, Ken Caminiti, Jim Harbaugh, David Justice, Eric Karros, Jeanette "Black Widow" Lee, Pete Rose

=== Season 3 (1998) ===
No. overall	No. in season	Title	Directed by	Written by	Original release date	Prod. code
22	1	"The Family Trust"	Robert Wuhl	Bruce Kirschbaum	June 7, 1998	301
After Kirby signs hockey star Luc Cassoulet to the biggest contract in AMM history, an extremely delicate situation develops: how does AMM get paid its commissions without going public that the client is a deadbeat? Meanwhile, Arliss has his hands full defending NBA star Dewayne Troy for assaulting a referee. Guests: Cammi Granato, Willie McGinest, Don Ohlmeyer
23	2	"My Job Is to Get Jobs"	John Fortenberry	Kevin Falls & Matt McGuinness	June 14, 1998	302
AMM client Theo Holt is the kind of football player every team needs: a reliable backup quarterback capable of winning games. But when Theo's team decides to let him go and there are no other takers for his services, Arliss begins to wonder. When Arliss learns about a league-wide rumor that Theo is gay, he resurrects Theo's career as only Arliss can. Guests: Oscar De La Hoya, Bob Kraft, Al Michaels, Ken Norton Jr., Craig Sager
24	3	"Whatever It Takes"	Michael Grossman	Story by : Robert Wuhl & Allan Stephan; Teleplay by : Barry Gold	June 21, 1998	303
Representing clients who line up against each other in the heat of battle is nothing new to Arliss. But he hopes to hold running back Quinton Holloway out of Sunday's game. It isn't because Quinton will face another AMM client, linebacker Chet Smitrovich. So when Arliss gets Quinton a new contract extension, it clears the way for a showdown. Guests: Jerome Bettis, Michael Irvin, Jimmy Johnson, Tim McDonald, Jim Rome, Dave Winfield
25	4	"Fans First"	Melanie Mayron	Eddie Feldmann	June 28, 1998	304
Disaster hits AMM when Defensive Player of the Year Lucian Balboa is stabbed by a crazed fan at the office's annual Super Bowl party. Where was the security? How did the stabber get into the party? These are the questions Arliss has to answer. And now Lucian has decided not to play on Super Sunday unless Arliss can guarantee that the stabber will be locked up. Guests: Oksana Baiul, Terrell Davis, Ryan Leaf, Dorsey Levens, Dan Patrick, Leigh Steinberg
26	5	"Where Do Clients Come From?"	Tim Marx	Joan Ackermann	July 5, 1998	305
Whenever a rival agent passes away, Arliss always leads the feeding frenzy to sign the available clients. But when Leo Maroni bites the dust, young turk Jeremy Brenner gives Arliss a battle in the scramble for new business. That's why Arliss signs Kit Ballew, a loser on the NASCAR circuit. But with nothing to live for, Kit starts tearing up the field, giving Arliss more than he bargained for. Guests: Dale Earnhardt, Jeff Gordon, Richard Petty, Matt Williams, Charles Woodson
27	6	"The Legacy"	Linda Rockstroh	Kevin Falls	July 12, 1998	306
Arliss has a comfortable arrangement with a Midwestern football powerhouse university: Arliss negotiates the school's exclusive network TV deal pro bono, and teaches an ethics class at the school. This provides him access to the student-athletes and creates a pipeline straight from the dorm to AMM. However, the pipeline may dry up when an investigation into legendary Coach Duffy's program reveals some improprieties. Guests: Barry Switzer, Joe Theismann, Marc Blucas
28	7	"What Arliss Hath Joined Together"	Ellen Pressman	Joan Ackermann	July 19, 1998	307
AMM client Amadou M'Bow is in love. And the NBA center from Senegal plans to marry his beloved, Miss Lisa Klein of Long Island. When Arliss insists that Amadou get his betrothed to sign a prenuptial agreement, Lisa balks, wedding bells are put on hold and Amadou plans to hang up the hightops. Guests: Kenny Anderson, Jerry Colangelo, Mia Hamm, John Randle
29	8	"The Working Man's Friend"	Perry Lang	Barry Gold	July 26, 1998	308
As a fierce rainstorm brings the city to a standstill, Arliss is virtually alone at AMM. That is, until pitching sensation Diego Sanchez, like manna from heaven, arrives at the office after defecting from Cuba. But Arliss must rely on some unexpected assistance to overcome the obstacles of the day. Guests: Gilbert Brown, Jerry Colangelo, Ivan Rodriguez, Picabo Street, Jerry Tarkanian
30	9	"Stanley Babson... Win, Place or Show"	Steve Confer	Matt McGuinness	August 2, 1998	309
AMM's financial whiz Stanley Babson is fed up with his conservative reputation. But when Arliss accuses him of always playing it safe, Stanley puts the company at risk by using clients' funds to purchase a racehorse. Guests: Bob Baffert, Jim Colbert, Tippi Hedren, Curt Shilling, Eric Young
31	10	"Behind Every Great Client..."	Melanie Mayron	Jim McCoulf	August 9, 1998	310
Arliss knows as well as any agent that helping a client in his personal life is part of the job. So when all-star shortstop Joe Garrison asks Arliss to tell his wife that he's leaving her, Arliss obliges. But what happens between Arliss and Erica Garrison isn't necessarily part of the job--nor what Joe had in mind. Guests: Cobi Jones, Rick Majerus
32	11	"The American Game"	Michael Grossman	Kevin Falls	August 16, 1998	311
Lockouts and strikes are unfortunately a part of pro sports, and nothing does more to alienate the fans. But when a ballplayer crosses the picket line, he knows the true meaning of alienation. Arliss must consider the consequences of representing replacement player Jim Greenbriar after Greenbriar saves Arliss' life. Guests: Bobby Bonilla, Jack Buck, Tony LaRussa, Mitch Richmond, Andre Rison, Drew Rosenhaus
33	12	"What Would I Do Without Wu?"	Perry Lang	Joan Ackermann	August 23, 1998	312
When Rita, the glue of AMM, gets her shot at representing clients, she proves herself an adept agent. Arliss, meanwhile, is helpless without his right-hand gal. To make matters worse, Kirby's cousin Fitz is Rita's fill-in. Guests: Jim Edmonds, Dominik Hasek, Katarina Witt
34	13	"His Name Is Arliss Michaels"	Steve Confer	Barry Gold	August 30, 1998	313
Longtime AMM client Donnie Thurman isn't quite ready to hang up the baseball cleats. So when Arliss tells Donnie there are no takers for his services and then signs a younger ballplayer to a big contract, Donnie sues Arliss for conflict of interest. Guests: Johnnie Cochran, Giussepe Franco, Magic Johnson, Armen Keteyian, Gary Payton, Andre Rison, Ron Shelton, Ozzie Smith, Van Earl Wright

=== Season 4 (1999) ===
No. overall	No. in season	Title	Directed by	Written by	Original release date	Prod. code
35	1	"Cause and Effect"	Robert Wuhl	Robert Wuhl & Allan Stephan	June 6, 1999	401
An upset stomach leads Arliss to Dr. Irv's for a routine checkup. But when Dr. Irv expresses his concerns based on Arliss' family history, Arliss starts thinking the "C" word. Meanwhile, Kirby and Rita try to help a little old lady sell her late husband's treasure trove of sports memorabilia. Guests: Roger Clemens, Tonya Harding, Cheryl Miller, Keith Olbermann, George Steinbrenner
36	2	"Taking One for the Team"	Andy Wolk	Kevin Falls	June 13, 1999	402
Arliss is so eager to sign high school baseball phenom Jake Battershell before any other agent does that he's willing to do anything to please Jake and his parents. Well, almost anything. Kirby's effort to help AMM client Seth Carson focus on his duties as a pro quarterback go further than anyone expects. Guests: Bob Costas, Tim Couch, Steve DeBerg, Chris Meyers, George Steinbrenner
37	3	"Our Past, Our Present, Our Future"	Melanie Mayron	Joan Ackermann	June 20, 1999	403
Fourteen-year-old skating champion Crystal Dupree is an AMM cash cow. But she learns the hard way, with Stanley's assistance, that Mom and Dad may not necessarily have her best interest at heart. Also, Kirby resists shutting down the "KIRBY CARlisle WASH."; Guests: Charles Barkley, Billie Jean King, Amanda Bynes
38	4	"People Are Assets Too"	Michael Grossman	Barry Gold	June 27, 1999	404
When the Lakers move from the Forum to the Staples Center, there will be fewer courtside seats, and the ticketholders with seniority will maintain their floor seats. Arliss is not one of those ticketholders, and desperately tries to find a way to keep his cherished seats on the floor. Guests: Jerry Buss, Dyan Cannon, Chick Hearn, Stu Lantz, Kurt Rambis
39	5	"The Stories You Don't Hear About"	John Murray	Norman Chad	July 4, 1999	405
It's fight night in Las Vegas and AMM client Ivory Ortega needs to get past Tomate de Cannes before a huge showdown (and payday!) with Oscar De La Hoya. But Arliss needs to act fast when he sees that Ivory is in no condition to box after a fight with his wife. Guests: Jamal Anderson, Bob Arum, Al Bernstein, Oscar De La Hoya, Prince Naseem Hamed, Jim Hill, Don King, Jim Lampley
40	6	"The Changing of the Guard"	Rina Allon	Rick Reilly & Richard Brenne	July 11, 1999	406
Arliss gets fogged in while in Kansas City negotiating shortstop client Rico Rosa's contract with team owner Helga Krupp. Helga's an un-P.C. penny-pincher, making her an easy target for just about everyone. Meanwhile, the AMM bowling team is relieved that Arliss, the weak link on the squad, is AWOL. Guests: George Brett, Eric Karros, Willie Roaf, Pete Sampras
41	7	"You Gotta Love This Game"	Timothy Marx	Matt McGuinness	July 18, 1999	407
The NBA lockout allows Arliss the opportunity to focus on the other aspects of sports representation, particularly his female clients. At Rita's urging they take on WNBA player Terry Shaw. Terry is unlike anyone AMM has ever represented, creating a newly found awareness and appreciation of women's sports. Guests: Chamique Holdsclaw, Gabrielle Reece, Glenn Rice, John Starks
42	8	"To Thine Own Self Be True"	Michael Grossman	Josh Goldstein	July 25, 1999	408
When The Korean government insists that AMM client, pitcher and native son Ja Ahn Kim serve in the Korean military, Arliss' deal-making expertise is put to the test. Meanwhile, AMM client and hockey enforcer Doug Hager is banned from the NHL and seeks a new career in professional wrestling. Guests: Eric Bischoff, Davey Johnson, Randy Savage, Lex Luger, Rick Steiner, Mike Tenay, Tony Schiavonne
43	9	"The Cult of Celebrity"	Linda Rockstroh	Christina Weir & Nunzio DeFilippis	August 1, 1999	409
Cooter McCoy is world-renowned for playing before huge crowds. But the country singing sensation wants to play baseball, not music, and seeks Arliss' assistance. Meanwhile, Rita and Kirby try to help Stanley find the woman of his dreams. Guests: Bob Costas, Ken Griffey, Jr., Travis Tritt, Jesse Ventura, Scott Erickson, Darius Rucker
44	10	"D-Day"	Bob Berlinger	Kevin Falls & Barry Gold	August 8, 1999	410
Rap-master extraordinaire T-Bagg enters the arena of sports agency, and a few AMM clients jump ship. And, with Arliss bedredden with chicken pox, it's up to Kirby and Stanley to make things happen at the NFL Draft. Guests: Chris Berman, Mike Holmgren, Jerry Jones, Mel Kiper, Jr., John Madden, Carmen Policy, Randy Moss, Stuart Scott
45	11	"The Art of Give and Take"	Steve Confer	Allan Stephan & Matt McGuinness	August 15, 1999	411
Arliss uses money from his foundation to buy off a bad childhood memory. Guests: Marcus Allen, Juwan Howard
46	12	"Rules of the Game"	Michael Grossman	Joan Ackermann & Kevin Falls	August 22, 1999	412
Feeling long in the tooth, Arliss gets a makeover, hoping to turn back the clock. Rita dates rival agent Justin Sturgess and Stanley is asked to join a prestigious country club. Guests: Tony Hawk, Lincoln Kennedy, Wally Szczerbiak

=== Season 5 (2000) ===
No. overall	No. in season	Title	Directed by	Written by	Original release date	Prod. code
47	1	"Making Things Happen"	Robert Wuhl	Robert Wuhl & Allan Stephan	June 4, 2000	501
Arliss buys a rare piece of memorabilia, and sends a client to a hypnotist to help him quit chewing tobacco. When treatment appears to work, Arliss sends Kirby there to quit gambling. Meanwhile, Rita tries to keep an LPGA client from falling off the wagon. Guests: Amy Alcott, Jamal Anderson, Linda Cohn, Susan Hunt, Kevin Kennedy, Joe Morgan
48	2	"Creatures of Habit"	Michael Grossman	Matt McGuinness	June 11, 2000	502
Arliss learns that a good friend and client, who is about to be elected to the Baseball Hall of Fame, is being charged with domestic abuse. Meanwhile, Rita's activist friend sides with the client's wife. Guests: Ernie Banks, Frank Deford, Rollie Fingers, Roy Jones, Jr., Steve Lyons, Gary Miller, Robert Shapiro, Dave Winfield
49	3	"I Get Involved"	Melanie Mayron	Nunzio DeFilippis & Christina Weir	June 18, 2000	503
Arliss has to walk the fence when two clients, both teammates, are dating the same girl. Rita plays Cyrano for one of the clients, and a TV reporter shows up to do a "Where Are They Now?" segment on Kirby. Guests: Marshall Faulk, Derek Fisher, Jerry Jones, Jeff Lurie, Wade Phillips
50	4	"Comings and Goings"	Melanie Mayron	Barry Gold	June 25, 2000	504
Arliss must help a client bury his mother. Meanwhile, Stanley's having a run of bad luck that threatens his chess game, so he goes looking for a "slumpbuster." And Kirby comes face-to-face with his own slumpbuster from 18 years ago, and must face the consequences. Guests: Tony Gonzalez, Lincoln Kennedy, Carl Lewis, Stuart Scott
51	5	"It's Who You Know"	Rina Sternfeld	David Rothenberg	July 9, 2000	505
Arliss tries to talk the "pot dealer to the NBA" out of retiring by offering to get his kid into a fancy private school. Meanwhile, Rita plays a relationship with a physical trainer by "The Rules."; Guests: None
52	6	"The Value of Honesty"	John Murray	Joan Ackermann	July 16, 2000	506
Arliss has an affair with a WNBA coach, but his client (also the coach's star player) wants her fired. Meanwhile, in the aftermath of a wild birthday celebration, Kirby and Rita suspect they may have "done it." Guests: Eric Dickerson, Jose Lima
53	7	"The Sum of the Parts"	Steve Confer	Barry Gold & Matt McGuinness	July 23, 2000	507
A baseball client needs a kidney, and Arliss tries to convince the player's minor-league brother to donate his. Meanwhile, a soccer client scores a goal for the opposing team, causing him to take refuge at Rita's apartment while Kirby goes into hiding. Guests: Jesse Armstead, Steve Francis, Kevin Greene, Pat O'Brien
54	8	"Honoring Our Past"	Steve Confer	Sam Kass	July 30, 2000	508
When one of his boxing clients enlists in the Army, Arliss tries to figure out a way to get him out. Meanwhile, Stanley and a native-American tribal chief attempt to get a football team to change its "offensive" mascot. Guests: Seth Abraham, Denny Neagle, Bruce Smith
55	9	"When Opportunity Knocks"	Linda Rockstroh	Nunzio DeFilippis & Christina Weir	August 6, 2000	509
Arliss, Rita and Stanley must deal with Kirby's absence when he leaves the agency to join a fledgling football league run by a flashy TV producer. Guests: Doug Flutie, Barry Larkin, Alex Ochoa, Joe Piscopo, Jeremy Roenick
56	10	"Last Call"	Norman Chad	Timothy Marx	August 13, 2000	510
Arliss tries to get a dotcom millionaire team owner to re-sign an aging broadcaster who may be losing his touch. Rita ghostwrites a column for Arliss, and Kirby helps discipline Stanley's unruly dog. Guests: Tommy Lasorda, Al Leiter, Rudy Martzke, Jon Miller, Lamar Odom
57	11	"The Fire Within"	Lev Spiro	Joan Ackermann & Kevin Falls	August 20, 2000	511
Arliss pursues popular mascot Reggie the Rooster, using a fundraiser Stanley has organized for another mascot, who was injured in the line of duty. Rita takes up boxing after a series of obscene phone calls. Guests: Laila Ali, Baron Davis, Jason Giambi, Jeremy Giambi, Tracy McGrady, Luc Robitaille, Dan Wilkinson
58	12	"Where There's a Will..."	Michael Grossman	Allan Stephan	August 27, 2000	512
Arliss is named executor of a superstar jockey's will, which leaves everything to his wife - but he had two wives. Kirby discovers that his former coach is now homeless. Guests: Keith Van Horn
59	13	"The Truth Shall Set You Free"	Melanie Mayron	Joan Ackermann & Matt McGuinness	September 3, 2000	513
Arliss' ne'er-do-well brother Archie uses his name to further a scam. Kirby and Stanley plot their own scam on a stadium concession millionaire. Guests: Jim Brown, David Keith, Ryan Klesko, Leonard Maltin, Lawrence Taylor

=== Season 6 (2001) ===
No. overall	No. in season	Title	Directed by	Written by	Original release date	Prod. code
60	1	"Setting Precedents"	Robert Wuhl	Matt McGuinness	June 10, 2001	601
Arliss deals with the domestic problems of a female tennis superstar. Kirby helps a basketball client graduate from college. Guests: Dante Culpepper, Gary Carter, Patricia Manterola
61	2	"Fielding Offers"	John Murray	Robert Wuhl & Allan Stephan	June 17, 2001	602
Arliss treks to Canada in an effort to steal a hockey team; Rita uses alternative medicine in her war against age. Guests: Lou Diamond Phillips, Charles Durning, Jason Sehorn, David Wells
62	3	"You Are Your Priorities"	Rina Sternfeld	Joan Ackermann	June 24, 2001	603
While Stanley and Kirby consider investing in the rodeo business, Arliss re-kindles an old flame. Guests: Hugh Douglas, Derek Fisher, Rick Fox, Damione Lewis, John Lynch, Andrea Marcovicci, Ty Murray, Shaquille O'Neal, Tony Siragusa, Van Earl Wright
63	4	"Question of Character"	Rina Sternfeld	Joan Ackermann	July 1, 2001	604
While attempting to sign the ultimate client, Arliss must deal with a race-car driver's numerous wives. Guests: Floyd Mayweather, James Worthy
64	5	"The Price of Their Toys"	Linda Rockstroh	Rebecca Reynolds	July 8, 2001	605
Arliss tries to get a husband-and-wife broadcasting team their own show; Kirby deals with a spoiled clients's new "hobbies. Guests: Rachel York, Dick Clark, Gary Miller, Dick Stockton, Lesley Visser, Bob Costas
65	6	"Like No Business I Know"	Steve Confer	Nunzio DeFilippis & Christina Weir	July 15, 2001	606
Arliss seeks revenge on a baseball manager who embarrasses him; an actor studies Kirby as research for a movie role. Guests: Tom Arnold, Steve Kmetko, Lennox Lewis, Jeffrey Lyons, Jeff Fahey
66	7	"Of Cabbages and Kings"	Timothy Marx	Nunzio DeFilippis & Christina Weir	July 22, 2001	607
Kirby reps a mercurial college basketball coach; Arliss is frustrated trying to sell beachfront property. Guests: Kelly Slater, Ken Howard, Warrick Dunn, Jerry Stackhouse
67	8	"As Others See Us"	Michael Grossman	Joan Ackermann	July 29, 2001	608
While Rita is visiting her family, Kirby and Stanley prepare Arliss' "surprise roast." Guests: David Brenner, Jay Buhner, Jack Carter, Norm Crosby, Johnny Dark, Phyllis Diller, Dom Irrerra, George Wallace, Marshall Faulk, Sparky Anderson, Jeremy Roenick, Dara Torres, Tim Salmon, Rosalind Chao
68	9	"Giving Something Back"	Michael Grossman	Chrisanne Eastwood & Matt McGuinness	August 5, 2001	609
A female pro-golf client conceals a dark secret; Kirby gets hold of a piece of rare memorabilia. Guests: Susan Hunt, Marion Jones, Michelle McGann, Bert Sugar, Zach Thomas, Dan Lauria, Ted Leonsis
69	10	"Hard Choices"	Robert Wuhl	Matt McGuinness	August 12, 2001	610
Arliss faces his first year in the red, while Kirby deals with his model girlfriend. Guests: Mark Cuban, "Sugar" Shane Mosley, Rich Eisen, Pat O'Brien

=== Season 7 (2002) ===
No. overall	No. in season	Title	Directed by	Written by	Original release date	Prod. code
70	1	"The Immortal"	Michael Grossman	Seth Greenland	June 16, 2002	701
Arliss deals with a revered baseball legend and his namesake daughter. Stanley escorts a boxer to his HBO debut. Guests: James Coburn, Lindsay Crouse; Cameos: John Salley, Yogi Berra. Note: This episode from 2002 was Mr. Coburn's final acting role before his death in November that year.
71	2	"What You See is What You Get"	Rena Sternfeld	Matt McGuinness	June 23, 2002	702
Rita manages a client's political passion, while Arliss helps a team member find her passion. Stanley's new car gets dinged. Guests: Keith Carradine, Cynthia Sikes, Susan Egan. Cameos: Elton Brand, Jerry Dunphy, Ray Lewis
72	3	"In With the New"	Michael Grossman	Rebecca Reynolds	June 30, 2002	703
Arliss works to make an NBA client's dream come true, while Stanley mentors a student project. Guests: David Garrison. Cameos: Pat Croce, Bill Goldberg, Robert Shapiro, Jason Giambi.
73	4	"There's No I in Team"	Stephen Confer	Jennifer Allen	July 7, 2002	704
Arliss hires a protégé, to the dismay of Kirby. Rita is attracted to the chef at Stanley's new restaurant. Guests: Fabio, Kristoff St. John, John Reilly. Cameos: Jillian Barberie, Deion Sanders, Kordell Stewart.
74	5	"Playing it Safe"	Jonathan Fink	Chrisanne Eastwood	July 21, 2002	705
Arliss tries to realize his gold record dreams while helping a baseball player through a tough decision. Guests: Bruce Hornsby, Grant Show, Michael Trucco, Robin Atkin Downes. Cameos: Billy Bean, Tara Lipinski, Quentin Richardson, Darius Miles, Maurice Greene.
75	6	"Moments to Remember"	Robert Wuhl	Allan Stephan Blasand	July 28, 2002	706
Kirby dates a female body builder, while Arliss motivates a traumatized NFL client. Guests: Seymour Cassel. Cameos: Jack La Lanne, Tony Gonzalez, Steve Mariucci, Deepak Chopra.
76	7	"It's All in the Game"	Michael Grossman	Seth Greenland & Allan Stephan Blasand	August 4, 2002	707
Arliss and Kirby support an ex-client's political rise while Rita seeks a spokesmodel for a specialty clothing item. Guests: Glenn Frey, David Ogden Stiers. Cameos: Bill Romanowski, Jeremy Roenick, Tyrone Wheatley, Reggie Miller, Luis Gonzalez.
77	8	"Standards and Practices"	Timothy Marx	Matt McGuinness	August 11, 2002	708
Stanely advises his football star nephew on college choices, while Arliss helps a female broadcasting client deal with network demands. Guests: Keith David. Cameos: Jim Mora, Van Earl Wright, Doug Krikorian, Larry King.
78	9	"End Game"	Melanie Mayron	Joan Ackerman	August 18, 2002	709
A former lover returns to win back Rita's affection, while Arliss and Stanley lure a reclusive former chess champion back to the game. Guests: John Glover. Cameos: Mike Bibby.
79	10	"Profiles in Agenting"	Robert Wuhl	Robert Wuhl & Allan Stephen Blasand	September 1, 2002	710
Arliss is smitten by Rita's friend, an adventuresome sports photographer. Stanley and Kirby enlist Roy Jones Jr. to endorse a cooking innovation. Guests: Marla Gibbs, Joe Bologna, Diane Farr. Cameos: Roy Jones Jr.
80	11	"All That Glitters"	John Murray	Joan Ackerman	September 8, 2002	711
In series finale, AMM is left in the hands of Rita, Kirby, and Stanley, while Arliss soul searches. Guests: John Rhys-Davies, Wings Hauser, Rusty Schwimmer. Cameos: Curt Schilling.
