= Off Season (2012 film) =

- Directed by: Katie Carman
- Written by: Elizabeth Lee
- Produced by: Katie Carman; Elizabeth Lee; Cold Hands Productions; Spinning Hexagon
- Starring: Elizabeth Lee; Kimani Shillingford; Abe Koogler; Dan Odell; Mchale Bright; Jun Naito
- Cinematography: Jay Kidd
- Edited by: Katie Carman
- Music by: Justin Schornstein
- Release date: May 28, 2012 (Anthology Film Archives)
- Running time: 90 minutes
- Country: United States
- Language: English

Off Season is a 2012 noir thriller independent film directed by Katie Carman and starring Elizabeth Lee, Kimani Shillingford, Abe Koogler, Mchale Bright, Dan Odell and Jun Naito. The film had its premiere screening on May 28, 2012 at the Anthology Film Archives.

== Plot summary ==
Sylvie Stone takes refuge in an isolated beach hideaway after her husband is convicted of a sweeping act of financial fraud. A series of frightening occurrences lead her to discover she's being stalked by a mysterious presence.

== Premise ==
Daily Grindhouse called it a ""...a frighteningly original semi-supernatural tale of guilt and ripped-from-the-headlines redemption" in their review of the film, and Film Threat has said that "this isn’t a film that believes in some final twist, but instead, if you’re paying attention, the clues and direction for the narrative are all right there."

== Festivals ==
Off Season was chosen as an official selection of the NY NewFilmmakers Winter Series at Anthology Film Archives in January 2013. The film was also an official selection of the 2013 KIN International Film Festival in Yerevan, Armenia.

== Release ==
Off Season is currently available for download and streaming from Amazon OnDemand.
