= The Amazing Race 7 =

Season of television series

- Season 7
- Region 1 DVD cover
- Presented by: Phil Keoghan
- No. of teams: 11
- Winners: Uchenna & Joyce Agu
- No. of legs: 12
- Distance traveled: 40,000 mi (64,000 km)
- No. of episodes: 12 (including 1 recap)

Release
- Original network: CBS
- Original release: March 1 – May 10, 2005

Additional information
- Filming dates: November 20 – December 19, 2004

Series chronology
- ← Previous; Season 6 Next → Season 8

The Amazing Race 7 is the seventh season of the American reality competition show The Amazing Race. Hosted by Phil Keoghan, it featured eleven teams of two, each with a pre-existing relationship, competing in a race around the world. This season visited five continents and ten countries, traveling approximately 40,000 miles (64,000 km) over twelve legs. Filming took place from November 20 to December 12, 2004. Starting in Long Beach, racers traveled through Peru, Chile, Argentina, South Africa, Botswana, India, Turkey, England, and Jamaica, before returning to the United States, traveling through Puerto Rico, and finishing in Miami-Fort Lauderdale. New elements introduced this season include an expansion of the non-elimination leg penalty where penalized teams were stripped of most of their possessions. The season premiered on CBS on March 1, 2005, and concluded on May 10, 2005.

Married couple Uchenna and Joyce Agu were the winners of this season, while engaged couple Rob Mariano and Amber Brkich (of Survivor) finished in second place, and dating couple Ron Young Jr. and Kelly McCorkle finished in third place.

== Format ==
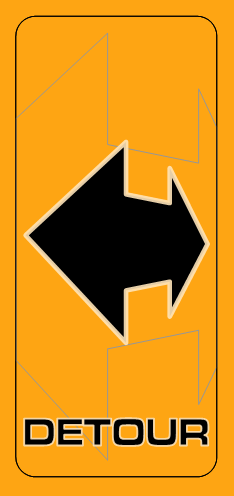
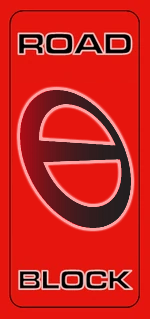
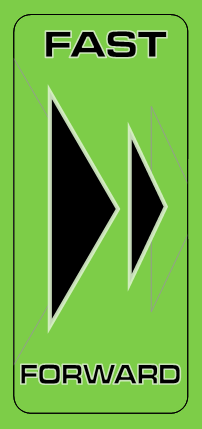
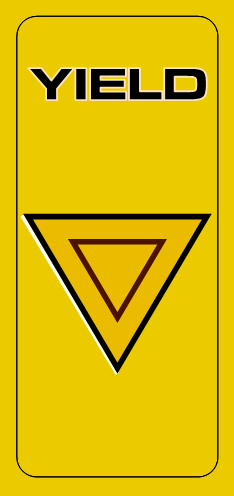
The clues which contestants receive during the course of the race generally fall into five categories: Route Info, Detour, Roadblock, Fast Forward, and Yield.

The Amazing Race is a reality television show created by Bertram van Munster and Elise Doganieri, and hosted by Phil Keoghan. The series follows teams of two competing in a race around the world. Each leg of the race requires teams to deduce clues, navigate foreign environments, interact with locals, perform physical and mental challenges, and travel on a limited budget provided by the show. At each stop during the leg, teams receive clues inside sealed envelopes, which fall into one of these categories:

- Route Info: These are simple instructions that teams must follow before they can receive their next clue.
- Detour: A Detour is a choice between two tasks. Teams may choose either task and switch tasks if they find one option too difficult. There is usually one Detour on each leg.
- Roadblock: A Roadblock is a task that only one team member can complete. Teams must choose which member will complete the task based on a brief clue they receive before fully learning the details of the task. There is usually one Roadblock on each leg.
- Fast Forward: A Fast Forward is a task that only one team may complete, which allows that team to skip all remaining tasks on the leg and go directly to the next Pit Stop. Teams may only claim one Fast Forward during the entire race.
- Yield: The Yield allows one team to force another team to stop racing for a predetermined amount of time. Teams may use the Yield only one time during the entire race.

Usually, teams who arrive last at the Pit Stop of each leg are progressively eliminated. On pre-determined non-elimination legs, the last arrivals are instead stripped of their provided cash and most of their possessions but able to continue the race. The first team to arrive at the finish line in the final episode wins the grand prize of US$1,000,000.

== Production ==
=== Development and filming ===
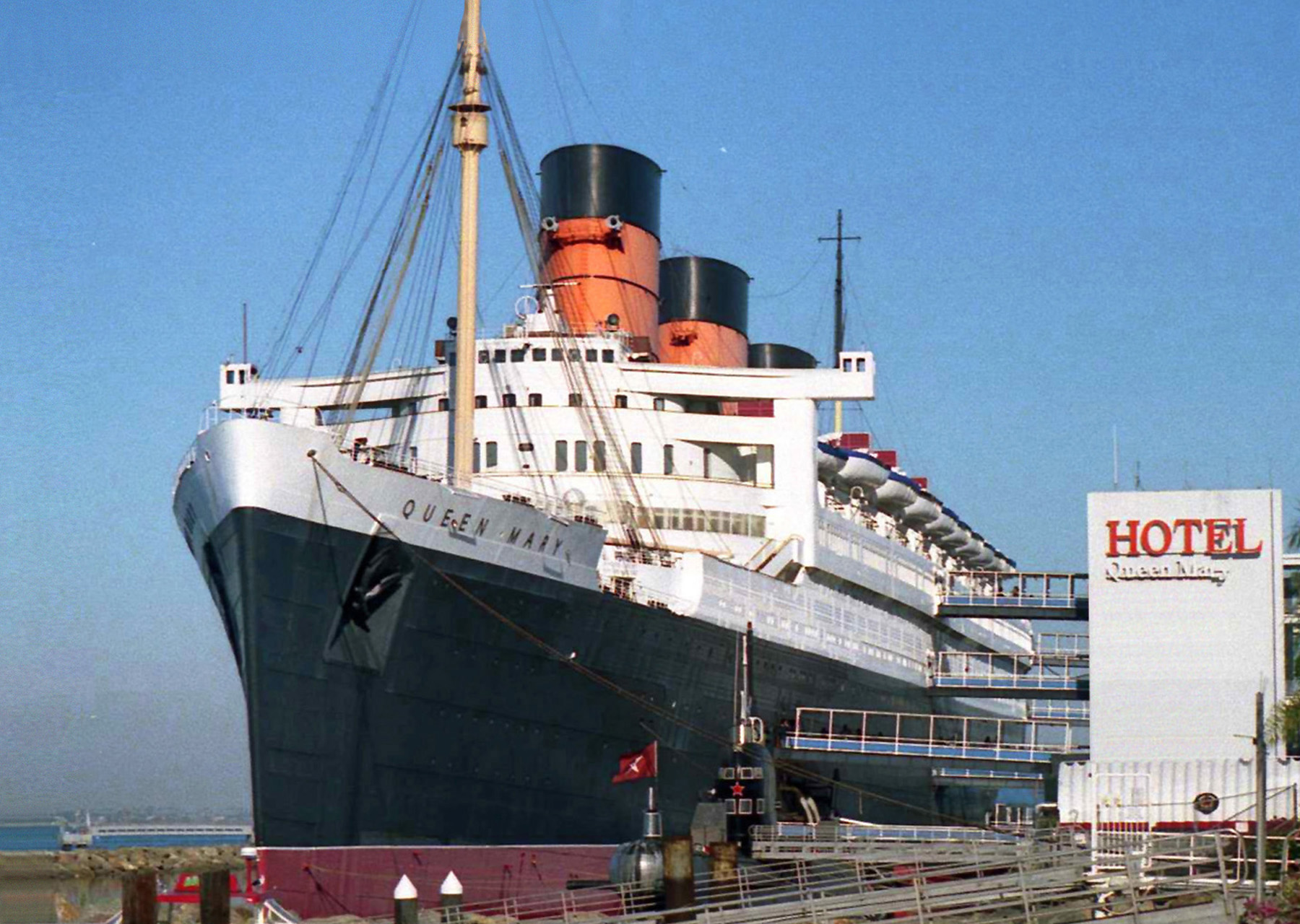
The starting line was located in the vicinity of RMS Queen Mary in front of the Aquarium of the Pacific in Long Beach, California.

The Amazing Race 7 took place over 29 days and traveled nearly 40,000 miles (64,000 km). Filming began on November 20, 2004, and finished on December 19, 2004. The teams raced through ten countries, five of which were not previously visited on the series: Peru, Chile, Botswana, Turkey, and Jamaica. Puerto Rico, a U.S. territory in the Caribbean, was also visited for the first time.

In this season, a change was made to the penalty for arriving last on a non-elimination leg. In addition to being stripped of all their money and receiving no allowance for the next leg, teams were forced to surrender all of their possessions, except for their passports and the clothes they were wearing, for the remainder of the season.

Controversy surrounded the final leg of the season when Rob & Amber and Uchenna & Joyce arrived at the airport in San Juan. They were both sold tickets for a flight leaving later than one whose gate was about to close. While Rob & Amber managed to get on this earlier departing flight, Uchenna & Joyce were shown through the gate as the boarding corridor between the gate and airplane began to shut. After a commercial break, the boarding corridor reopened to allow Uchenna and Joyce to board. No explanation was given as to why the gate reopened, which led to speculation about intervention by the production staff. In the "Revisiting the Race" special feature on the season 7 DVD, Uchenna, Rob, and Phil Keoghan denied the accusations of intervention by the production crew. Uchenna described his experience of finding the same airline agent at the gate who had previously informed him that there was no earlier available flight. Rob described Uchenna running around frantically trying to get onto the flight, which the final edited version of the show did not portray. Phil stated that the decision to reopen the door rested solely with the pilot, and that intervention by the production crew would have resulted in someone leaking such information out.

== Contestants ==
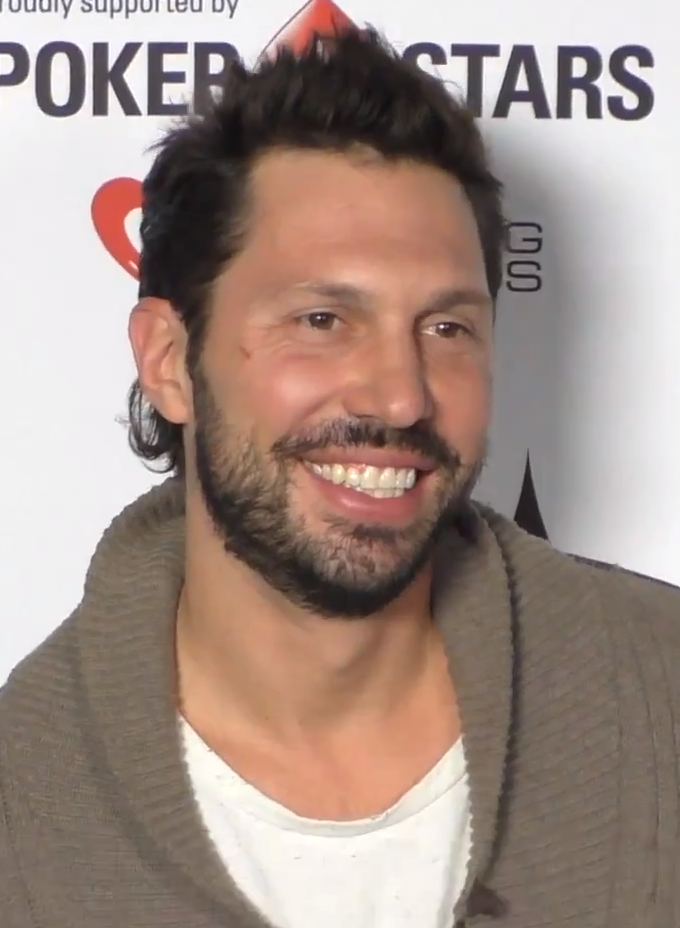
Brian Smith

Ron Young

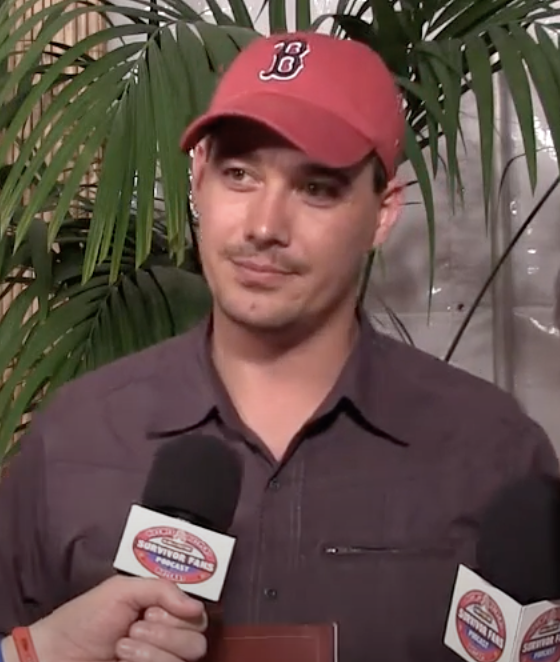
Rob Mariano

Joyce Agu (credited as Joyce Robinson) previously appeared on Star Trek: The Next Generation in a recurring role as Ensign Gates. Ron Young was a former Apache helicopter pilot who was shot down in Iraq and held as a prisoner of war for 22 days, and Kelly McCorkle was a former Miss South Carolina. Brian Thomas Smith previously competed on Christmas Fear Factor. Amber Brkich originally competed on Survivor: The Australian Outback, Rob Mariano competed on Survivor: Marquesas, and both also competed on Survivor: All-Stars, where they got engaged at the live finale.

Contestants	Age	Relationship	Hometown	Status
Ryan Phillips	31	Best Friends	Landrum, South Carolina	Eliminated 1st (in Cusco, Peru)
Chuck Horton	32	Best Friends	Inman, South Carolina	Eliminated 1st (in Cusco, Peru)
Megan Baker	26	Roommates	Oak Park, California	Eliminated 2nd (in Santiago, Chile)
Heidi Heidel	31	Roommates	Oak Park, California	Eliminated 2nd (in Santiago, Chile)
Debbie Cloyed	25	Lifelong Friends	Woodbridge, Virginia	Eliminated 3rd (in Las Heras, Argentina)
Bianca Smith	26	Lifelong Friends	Woodbridge, Virginia	Eliminated 3rd (in Las Heras, Argentina)
Susan Vaughn	54	Mother & Son	Hamilton, Ohio	Eliminated 4th (in Vicente Casares, Argentina)
Patrick Vaughn	26	Mother & Son	Hamilton, Ohio	Eliminated 4th (in Vicente Casares, Argentina)
Ray Hosteau	44	Dating On and Off	Canfield, Ohio	Eliminated 5th (in Makgadikgadi Pans National Park, Botswana)
Deana Shane	27	Dating On and Off	Youngstown, Ohio	Eliminated 5th (in Makgadikgadi Pans National Park, Botswana)
Brian Smith	27	Brothers	Santa Monica, California	Eliminated 6th (in Khwai, Botswana)
Greg Smith	24	Brothers	Santa Monica, California	Eliminated 6th (in Khwai, Botswana)
Lynn Warren	30	Boyfriends	West Hollywood, California	Eliminated 7th (in Jodhpur, India)
Alex Ali	22	Boyfriends	West Hollywood, California	Eliminated 7th (in Jodhpur, India)
Meredith Smith	69	Married & Retired	Easton, Maryland	Eliminated 8th (in London, England)
Gretchen Smith	66	Married & Retired	Easton, Maryland	Eliminated 8th (in London, England)
Ron Young, Jr.	28	Former POW & Pageant Queen	Villa Rica, Georgia	Third place
Kelly McCorkle	26	Former POW & Pageant Queen	Greenville, South Carolina	Third place
Rob Mariano	29	Engaged	Canton, Massachusetts	Runners-up
Amber Brkich	26	Engaged	Beaver, Pennsylvania	Runners-up
Uchenna Agu	40	Married	Houston, Texas	Winners
Joyce Agu	44	Married	Houston, Texas	Winners

Future appearances

Rob & Amber and Uchenna & Joyce were selected for The Amazing Race: All-Stars. Uchenna and Joyce appeared on The Amazing Race: 25 Years Around the World.

On May 25, 2005, CBS aired Rob & Amber's wedding at Atlantis Paradise Island in Nassau, Bahamas (a trip they had won during the season) during a special entitled Rob and Amber Get Married. After competing on The Amazing Race, Rob later competed on Survivor: Heroes vs. Villains, Survivor: Redemption Island, and served as a non-playing mentor on Survivor: Island of the Idols. Rob and Amber also both returned to compete on Survivor: Winners at War. On May 23, 2016, Rob also appeared on a Survivor-themed primetime special of The Price Is Right. In 2024, Rob competed on Deal or No Deal Island. Later that year, Rob competed on the third season of The Traitors.

== Results ==
The following teams are listed with their placements in each leg. Placements are listed in finishing order.

- A red placement with a dagger (†) indicates that the team was eliminated.
- An underlined blue placement with a double-dagger (‡) indicates that the team was the last to arrive at a Pit Stop in a non-elimination leg. As a penalty, they were stripped of their money, bags, and possessions other than their passports and the clothes they were wearing upon checking in, and they received no money at the start of the next leg.
- An italicized placement indicates the team's placement at the midpoint of a double leg.
- A green ƒ indicates that the team won the Fast Forward.
- A brown > indicates that the team used the Yield and a brown < indicates the team on the receiving end of the Yield.

Team placement (by leg)
Team	1	2	3	4	5	6	7	8a (Note: This was a double leg with two Detours and two Roadblocks shown over two episodes. The placements listed for the first half are the order of the teams' arrival at the Pit Stop in Lucknow.)	8b	9	10	11	12
Uchenna & Joyce	8th	4th	2nd	3rd	6th	3rd	3rd	3rd	1stƒ	1st	3rd	3rd‡	1st
Rob & Amber	3rd	1st	5th	1st	5th	2nd	1st	1st	3rd	3rd	1st> (Note: Rob & Amber chose to Yield Ron & Kelly.)	2nd	2nd
Ron & Kelly	10th	2nd	4th	4th	2nd	1st	2nd	2nd	2nd	4th‡	2nd<	1st	3rd
Meredith & Gretchen	6th	7th	7th	7th	7th‡	5th	5th (Note: Meredith & Gretchen initially arrived 4th, but had missed their clue at the end of the Roadblock and had to retrieve it before checking in. Lynn & Alex checked in during this time, dropping Meredith & Gretchen to 5th.)	5th	4th	2nd	4th†		
Lynn & Alex	5th	5th	1st	5th	4th	4th	4th	4th	5th†				
Brian & Greg	4th	9th	3rd	2nd	3rd	6th	6th†						
Ray & Deana	7th	3rd	6th	6th	1stƒ	7th†							
Susan & Patrick	2nd	8th	8th	8th†									
Debbie & Bianca	1st	6th	9th†										
Megan & Heidi	9th	10th†											
Ryan & Chuck	11th†												

== Race summary ==
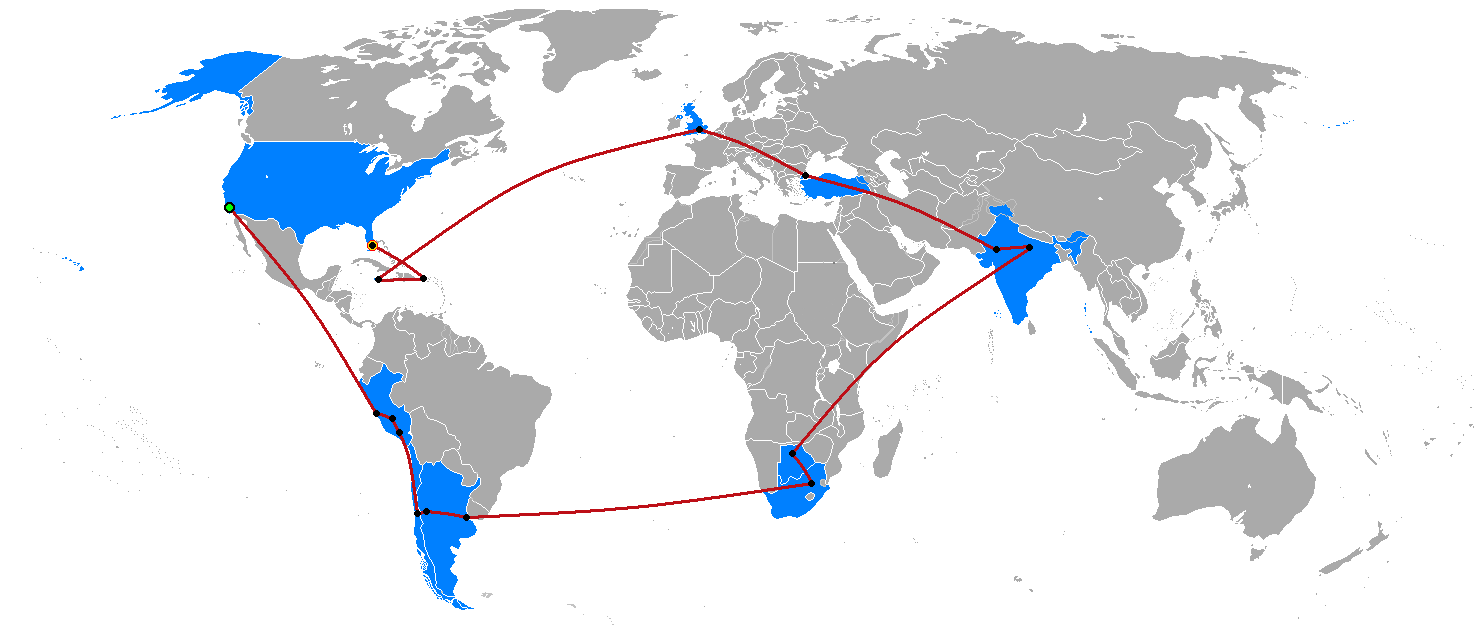
The route of The Amazing Race 7.

Destinations	Air travel Rail travel Water travel Bus travel Helicopter travel Bicycle travel Gondola travel
Route Markers	Detour Roadblock Fast Forward Yield Pit Stop

=== Leg 1 (United States → Peru) ===
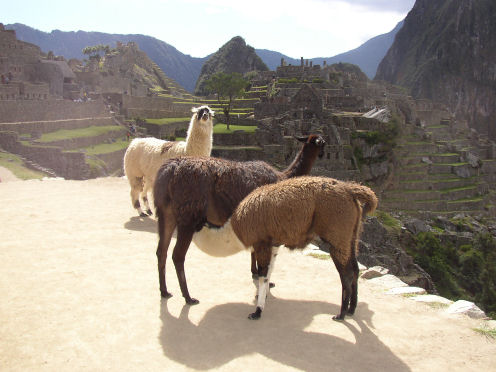
One of the Detour choices in Peru required teams to lead llamas to a pen.

- Episode 1: "Courteous? This Is a Race!" (March 1, 2005)
- Prize: US$10,000 cash for each racer (awarded to Debbie and Bianca)
- Eliminated: Ryan and Chuck

Locations

- Long Beach, California (Shoreline Aquatic Park) (Starting Line)
- Los Angeles (Los Angeles International Airport) → Lima, Peru
- Lima (Plaza de Armas)
- Lima (Ancón)
- Ancón (Playa Hermosa)
- Lima → Cusco (Alejandro Velasco Astete International Airport)
- Huambutio (Virgen del Carmen Kiosk)
- Huambutio (Gorge)
- Huambutio (Police Station)
- Písac (Písac Market)
- Cusco (Convento de la Merced)

Episode summary

- Teams set off from the Shoreline Aquatic Park in Long Beach, California, and drove to Los Angeles International Airport, where they booked one of two flights to Lima, Peru. The six teams on the American Airlines flight arrived 85 minutes before the remaining five teams on the United Airlines flight. Once in Lima, teams traveled by bus to the Plaza de Armas to find their next clue, which directed teams to travel by bus to Ancón.
- After arriving in Ancón, teams rode a rickshaw to Playa Hermosa. On the beach, teams searched through sand piles for a set of airline tickets leaving the next morning to Cusco. The second flight to Cusco was delayed due to technical difficulties and the four teams with tickets on that flight were booked onto the third flight, which departed 1 hour 40 minutes after the first.
- Once in Cusco, teams found their next clue outside the airport, which instructed them to travel via taxi to Huambutio and receive another clue from the owner of a marked kiosk. From there, teams continued to the top of a gorge, where they rode two ziplines to the bottom in order to receive their next clue.
- This season's first Detour was a choice between Rope a Llama or Rope a Basket. In Rope a Llama, teams had to rope two llamas and lead them to a nearby pen. In Rope a Basket, each team member had to carry a 35-pound (16 kg) basket of alfalfa two-thirds of a mile (1.1 km) to a store.
- After the Detour, teams went to the Huambutio Police Station and boarded delivery trucks, which departed every 20 minutes and could transport no more than three teams per truck. When the trucks arrived in Písac, teams had to search the local market to find their next clue, which directed them to the Pit Stop: the Convento de la Merced in Cusco.

=== Leg 2 (Peru → Chile) ===
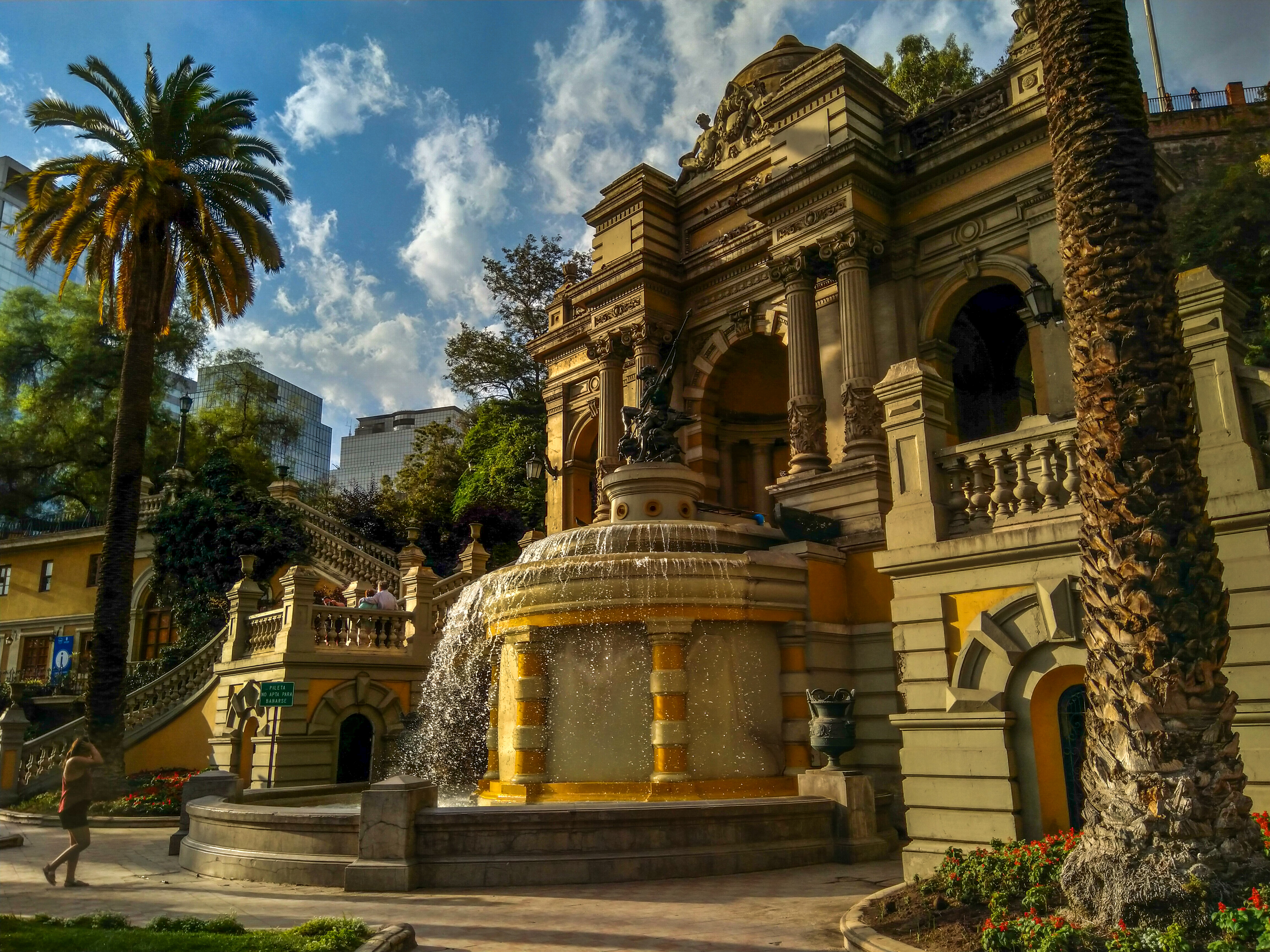
Teams finished the leg at the Neptune fountain on Santa Lucía Hill in Santiago.

- Episode 2: "The Whole Country Hates Me" (March 8, 2005)
- Prize: A trip to Atlantis Paradise Island in the Bahamas (awarded to Rob and Amber)
- Eliminated: Megan and Heidi

Locations

- Cusco (Convento de La Merced)
- Cusco → Arequipa
- Arequipa (Sindicato Único de Lustradores de Calzado)
- Arequipa → Santiago, Chile
- Santiago (San Cristóbal Hill – Virgin Mary Statue)
- Santiago (Mercado Central or Libreria Chilena & Library of Congress of Chile)
- Santiago (Cerro Santa Lucía – Neptune Fountain)

Episode summary

- At the start of this leg, teams were instructed to travel by bus to Arequipa. Once in Arequipa, teams had to search for the Sindicato Único de Lustradores de Calzado in order to find their next clue.
- In this season's first Roadblock, one team member had to work as a shoeshiner and polish five pairs of shoes on the street for a fee of one Peruvian sol per pair. After earning five sols, racers had to find their partner at the shoeshine union headquarters in order to receive their next clue.
- Based on the order that team members finished the Roadblock, teams were given plane tickets for one of two flights to Santiago, Chile, each of which carried five teams and departed forty-five minutes apart. Once in Santiago, teams had to travel to San Cristóbal Hill and ride the funicular to the statue of Virgin Mary in order to find their next clue.
- This leg's Detour was a choice between Shop or Schlep. In Shop, teams had to travel to the Mercado Central and find the Donde Augusto restaurant, where the chef gave them a shopping list. Teams then had to buy the proper quantities of five ingredients on the list. In Schlep, teams had to travel to the Libreria Chilena, load 180 books onto a hand truck, deliver the books eight blocks to the Library of Congress of Chile, and then place the books on a designated shelf.
- After the Detour, teams had to check in at the Pit Stop: the Neptune Fountain at Cerro Santa Lucía.

Additional note

- Chilean model Pamela Díaz appeared as the Pit Stop greeter in this leg.

=== Leg 3 (Chile → Argentina) ===
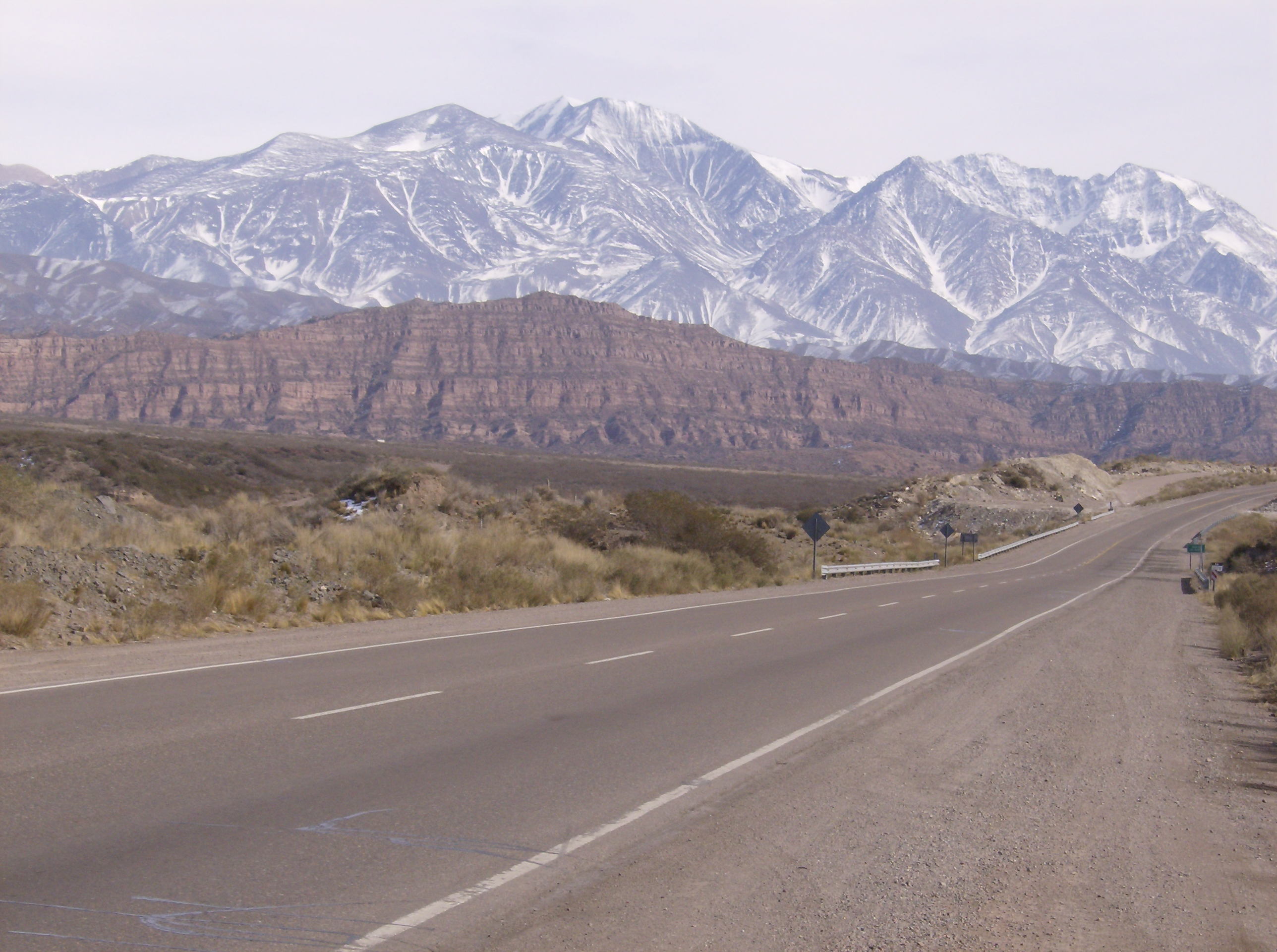
Teams traveled through the Andes Mountains near Mendoza Province in Argentina during this leg.

- Episode 3: "Do You Need Some Mouth-to-Mouth Resuscitation?" (March 15, 2005)
- Eliminated: Debbie and Bianca

Locations

- Santiago (Cerro Santa Lucía – Neptune Fountain)
- Santiago (Paseo Bulnes)
- Uspallata, Argentina (Puente Viejo)
- El Challao (Camping Suizo)
- Las Heras Department (Estancia San Isidro)

Episode summary

- At the start of this leg, teams had to travel to Paseo Bulnes, choose a marked car, and drive themselves through the Andes Mountains to Puente Viejo in Uspallata, Argentina, where they found their next clue.
- This leg's Detour was a choice between Paddle or Pedal. In Paddle, teams had to raft seven miles (11 km) down the Mendoza River. In Pedal, teams had to pedal mountain bikes seven miles (11 km) down a railroad track.
- After the Detour, teams had to drive to Camping Suizo in El Challao in order to find their next clue.
- In this leg's Roadblock, one team member had to eat a four-pound (1.8 kg) traditional Argentine feast consisting of cow ribs, pork sausage, blood sausage, cow intestines, udder, kidney, and part of a cow's salivary gland in order to receive their next clue directing them to the Pit Stop: the Estancia San Isidro.

Additional notes

- Rob and Amber, Ray and Deana, and Meredith and Gretchen incurred four-hour penalties each because Rob, Deana, and Meredith chose to quit the Roadblock.
- Debbie and Bianca fell five hours behind the other teams after they made a wrong turn while trying to drive to Argentina and wound up on the Chilean coastline instead.

=== Leg 4 (Argentina) ===
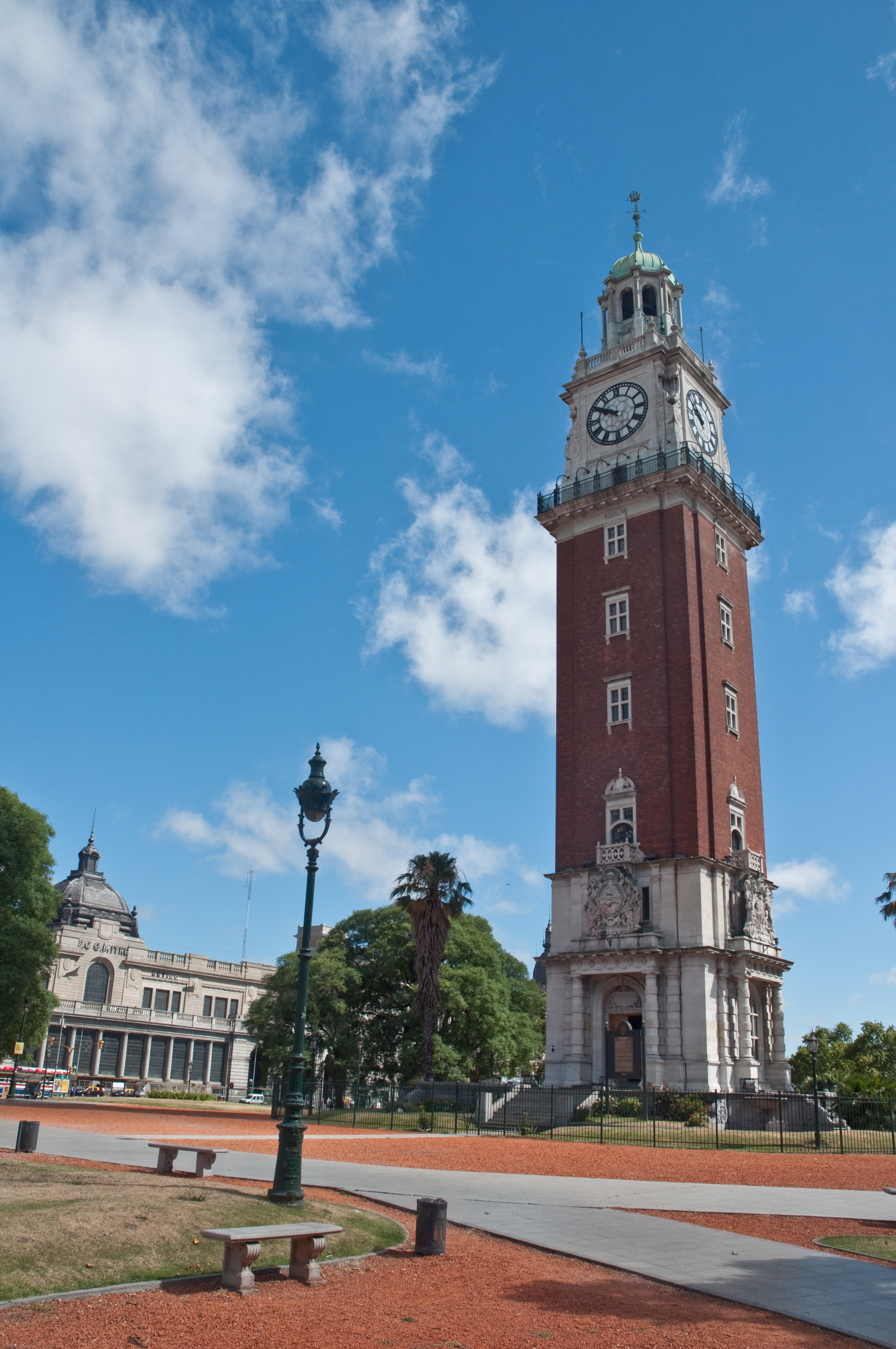
Teams found a clue at the English Clock Tower in Buenos Aires.

- Episode 4: "What a Gaucho You Are!" (March 22, 2005)
- Prize: A trip to London, England (awarded to Rob and Amber)
- Eliminated: Susan and Patrick

Locations

- Las Heras Department (Estancia San Isidro)
- Lunlunta (Cabaña la Guatana Gaucho Ranch)
- Mendoza → Buenos Aires
- Buenos Aires (Plaza de la Fuerza Aérea – English Clock Tower)
- Buenos Aires → Tigre
- Tigre (700 Lavalle – Docks)
- Vicente Casares (La Martina Polo Ranch)

Episode summary

- At the start of this leg, teams had to drive to the Cabaña la Guatana Gaucho Ranch in Lunlunta, where they found their next clue.
- In this leg's Roadblock, one team member had to complete a traditional gaucho challenge by riding a horse through a barrel racing course and then use a stick to spear a ring within 40 seconds in order to receive their next clue.
- After the Roadblock, teams had to drive to the Mendoza Airport and take one of two flights departing five hours apart to Buenos Aires. Once there, teams had to travel to the English Clock Tower in the Plaza de la Fuerza Aérea and find a man in a raincoat with their next clue. Teams were then instructed to travel by train to Tigre and search the docks for their next clue.
- This leg's Detour was a choice between Shipwreck or Island. In Shipwreck, teams had to find an abandoned ship within a seven-square-mile (18 km^{2}) area, using only a 30-year-old picture as a reference. In Island, teams had to use a map to travel four miles (6.4 km) up the San Antonio River and find an island.
- After the Detour, teams had to check in at the Pit Stop: La Martina Polo Ranch in Vicente Casares.

=== Leg 5 (Argentina → South Africa) ===
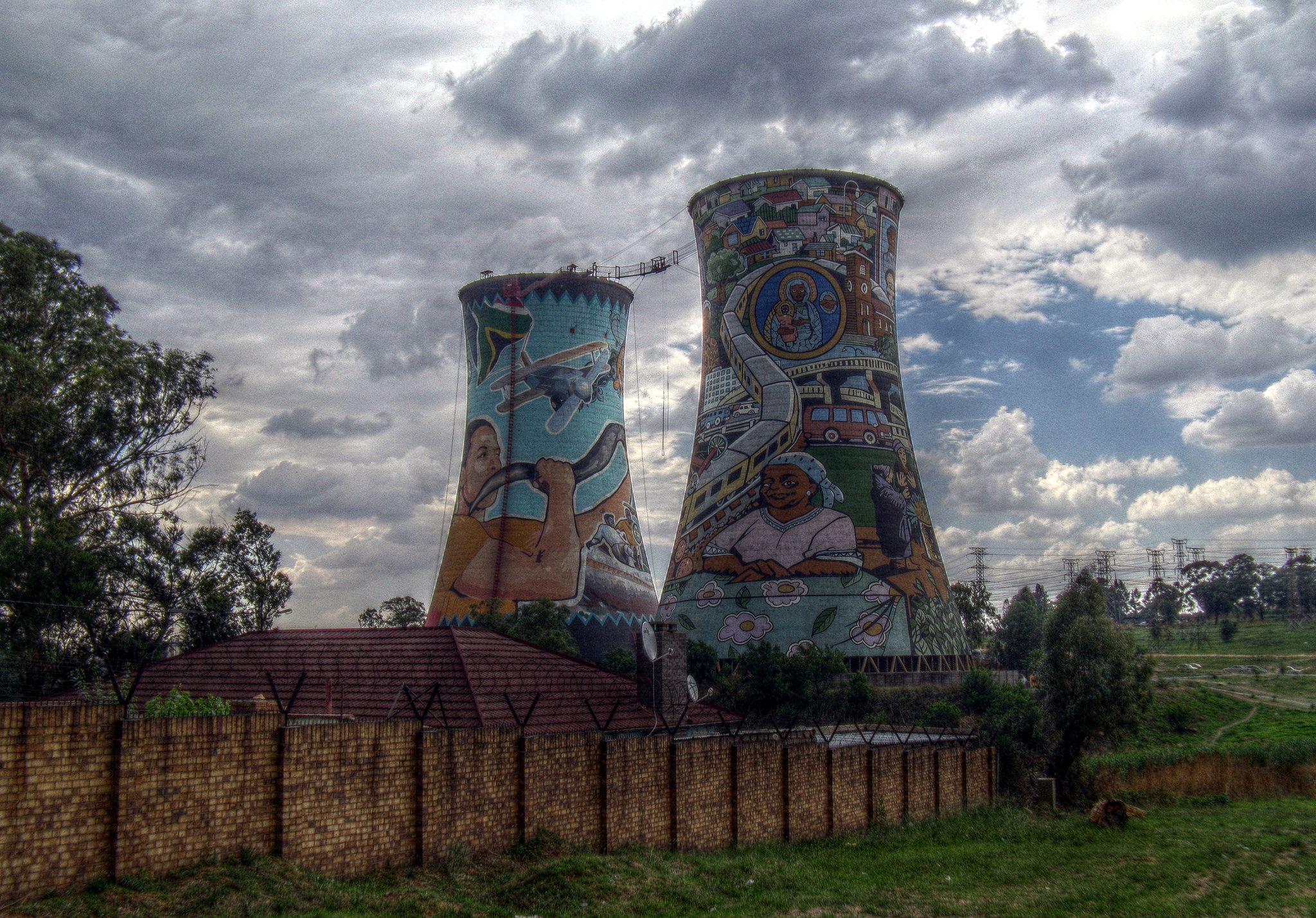
For the season's first Fast Forward, one team had to traverse one of the Orlando Cooling Towers in Soweto.

- Episode 5: "I've Been Wanting a Face-Lift for a Long Time" (March 29, 2005)
- Prize: Two Toyota RAV4 vehicles (awarded to Ray and Deana)

Locations

- Vicente Casares (La Martina Polo Ranch)
- Buenos Aires → Johannesburg, South Africa (Johannesburg International Airport)
- Soweto (Orlando Cooling Towers)
- Krugersdorp (Wild Cave Adventures) or Broederstroom (Lesedi Cultural Village)
- Soweto (Baragwanath Market)
- Soweto (Orlando Children's Home)
- Soweto (Ngakane Street – Soweto Overlook)

Episode summary

- At the start of this leg, teams were instructed to fly to Johannesburg, South Africa. Once there, teams had to search the airport parking lot for a marked car, which contained their next clue.
- This season's first Fast Forward required one team to go to the Orlando Power Station in Soweto. There, they had to walk across one of the cooling towers on a suspension bridge 30 stories above the ground. Ray and Deana won the Fast Forward.
- This leg's Detour was a choice between Tunnels or Tribes. In Tunnels, teams drove to Wild Cave Adventures in Krugersdorp, where they had to rappel 45 feet (14 m) into a dark cave and search for their next clue. In Tribes, teams drove to the Lesedi Cultural Village in Broederstroom, where they found five objects and had to deliver the correct item to each of the village's five tribes. For each correct item delivered, a chief gave them a necklace. Once teams had all five necklaces, they could exchange them for their next clue.
- After the Detour, teams had to drive to the Baragwanath Market in Soweto in order to find their next clue.
- In this leg's Roadblock, one team member had to search the market and purchase five items from vendors in order to receive their next clue.
- After the Roadblock, teams had to deliver their purchased items to the Orlando Children's Home in order to receive their next clue, which directed them to the Pit Stop: the Soweto Overlook on Ngakane Street.

Additional note

- This was a non-elimination leg.

=== Leg 6 (South Africa → Botswana) ===
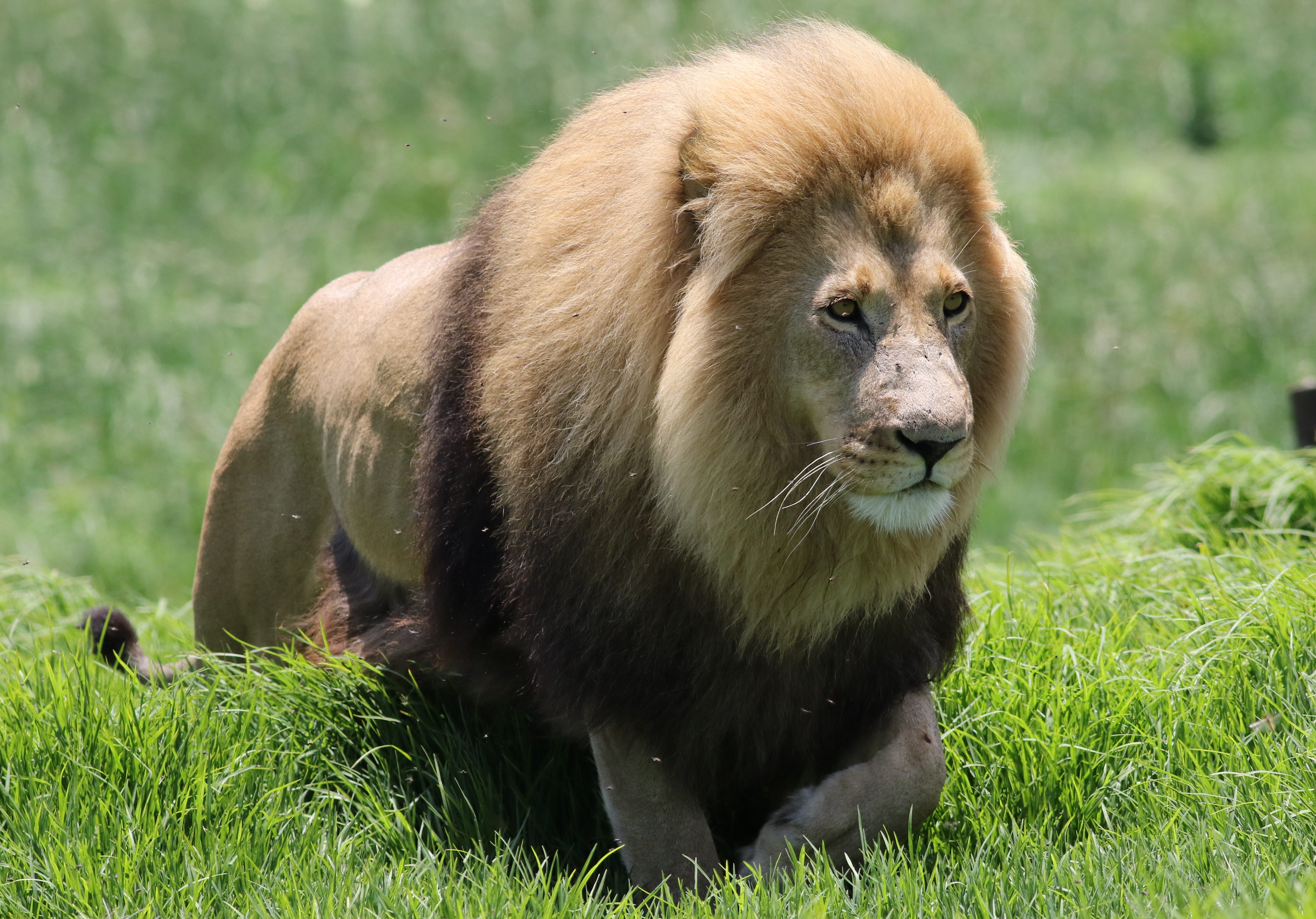
Before heading to Botswana, teams fed lions at the Rhino & Lion Nature Reserve in Krugersdorp, South Africa.

- Episode 6: "We're Moving Up the Food Chain" (March 29, 2005)
- Eliminated: Ray and Deana

Locations

- Soweto (Ngakane Street – Soweto Overlook)
- Krugersdorp (Rhino & Lion Nature Reserve)
- Johannesburg → Gaborone, Botswana
- Gaborone → Francistown
- Francistown → Gweta (Giant Aardvark)
- Xau Xarra (Cattle Post)
- Makgadikgadi Pans National Park (Makgadikgadi Pans)

Episode summary

- At the start of this leg, teams were instructed to travel to the Rhino & Lion Nature Reserve in Krugersdorp. There, teams had to sign up for one of two shuttles departing one hour apart that took them through the reserve, where they had to help feed the lions in order to receive their next clue, which instructed them to fly to Gaborone, Botswana. Once in Botswana, teams had to travel by train and bus to a giant aardvark statue near Gweta in order to find their next clue.
- In this leg's Roadblock, one team member had to complete a traditional bushman hunting exercise by throwing a spear 20 feet (6.1 m) into a swinging bag to receive their next clue.
- After the Roadblock, teams had to drive themselves along a marked road to a cattle post at Xau Xarra, where they found their next clue.
- This leg's Detour was a choice between Food or Water. In Food, teams had to use two sticks and a wooden container called a kika to pound enough corn into powder so as to fill a basket. In Water, teams had to fill 12 ostrich egg shells with water from an underground spring using reed straws and then bury them.
- After the Detour, teams had to drive themselves along a marked road to the Makgadikgadi Pans on the edge of the Kalahari Desert in order to find the Pit Stop.

Additional note

- Legs 5 and 6 aired back-to-back as a special two-hour episode.

=== Leg 7 (Botswana) ===
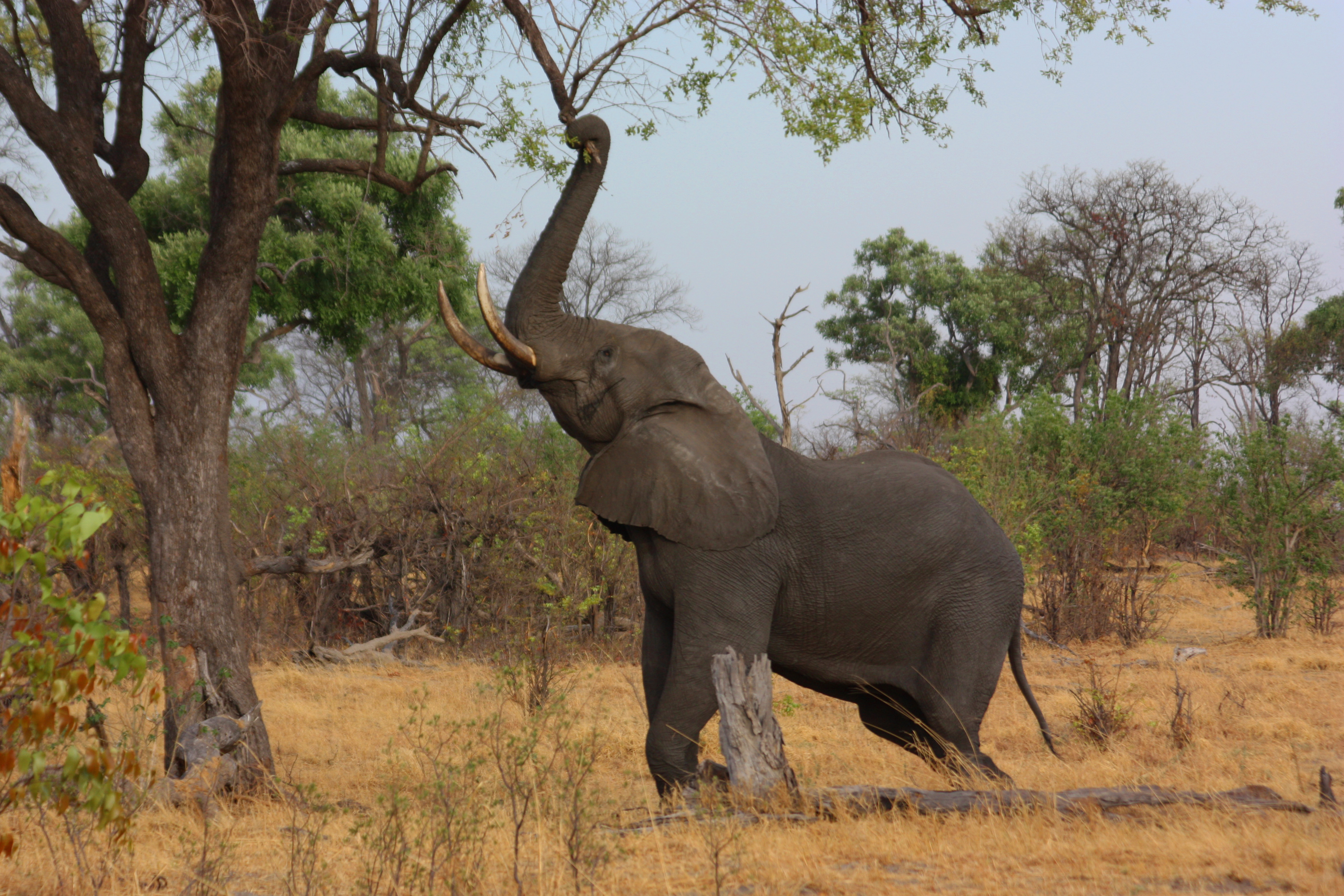
Teams encountered many African animals, including elephants, during their drive through Botswana.

- Episode 7: "Houston, We Have an Elephant!" (April 5, 2005)
- Prize: A trip to Monaco (awarded to Rob and Amber)
- Eliminated: Brian and Greg

Locations

- Makgadikgadi Pans National Park (Makgadikgadi Pans)
- Sankuyo Village (Water Tower)
- Khwai (Khwai River)
- Khwai (Khwai River Lodge)

Episode summary

- At the start of this leg, teams had to drive themselves through Maun and then continue to Sankuyo Village, where they found their next clue beneath a water tower.
- This leg's Detour was a choice between Carry It or Milk It. In Carry It, each team member had to carry three items on their heads (a bucket of water, a basket of corn, and a bundle of wood) to a cooking area 70 yards (64 m) away without using their hands. In Milk It, teams had to select up to four goats from a pen and milk them until they filled a 10-US-fluid-ounce (300 ml) cup.
- After the Detour, teams had to drive to a marked crossing at the Khwai River in order to find their next clue.
- In this leg's Roadblock, one team member had to drive their vehicle across a crocodile-inhabited crossing of the Khwai River. They then had to choose a marked path by removing a flagged post and use their vehicle to remove two trees felled by elephants before retrieving their next clue at the end of the path. Teams could then drive to the Pit Stop: the Khwai River Lodge.

=== Leg 8 (Botswana → India) ===
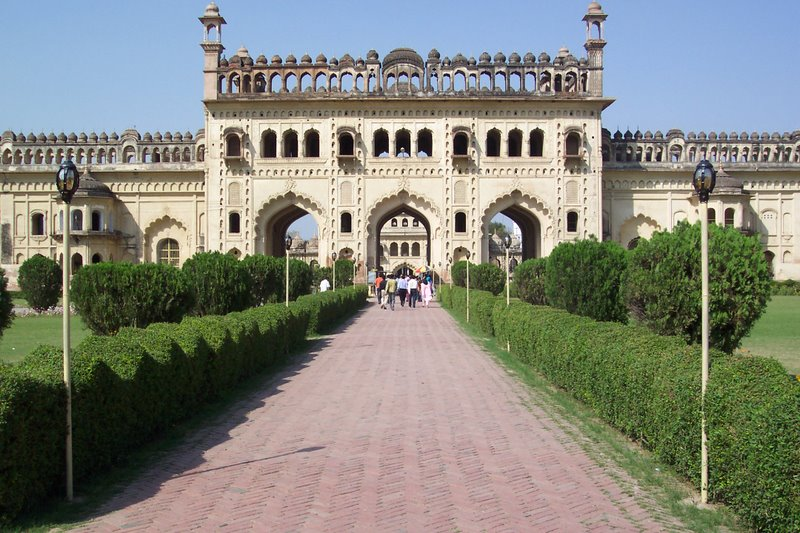
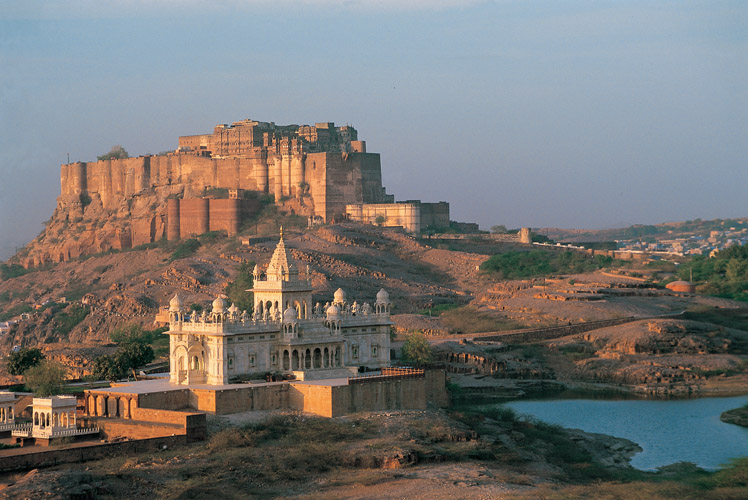
After arriving in Lucknow, teams found their next clue at the Bara Imambara (above), while the Jaswant Thada in Jodhpur (below) served as the Pit Stop for this double-length leg.
- Episode 8: "Mow'em Down, Like Grass" (April 12, 2005) & Episode 9: "We Have a Bad Elephant" (April 19, 2005)
- Eliminated: Lynn and Alex

Locations

- Khwai (Khwai River Lodge)
- Khwai (Khwai River Airport) → Francistown
- Francistown → Lucknow, India
- Lucknow (Bara Imambara)
- Lucknow (Kohinoor Steel Emporium)
- Lucknow (Aishbagh – Indane Bhushan Gas Service)
- Lucknow (Mehrotra Coal Depot & K.K. Jaiswal Charcoal Merchants or Sharma Tea Corner & Nagar Nigam Office)
- Lucknow (Charbagh Multistory Flats)
- Lucknow → Jodhpur (Jodhpur Junction Railway Station)
- Jodhpur (Sardar Market)
- Jodhpur (Kailashoham Gaure Shwar Mahadev Mandir)
- Jodhpur (Panna Niwas & Shri Kunj Bihari Temple)
- Jodhpur (Deora Krishi Farm)
- Jodhpur (Jaswant Thada)

Episode summary (Episode 8)

- At the start of this leg, teams were instructed to fly to Lucknow, India. To reach Lucknow, teams were required to sign up for one of three charter flights to Francistown, where they booked tickets to Mumbai, India, and then a connecting flight to Lucknow. Once there, teams had to travel to Bara Imambara, don a head cover or headscarf, and search the Bouli for their next clue, which directed teams to travel by horse-drawn Tonga to the Kohinoor Steel Emporium in order to find their next clue.
- In this leg's first Roadblock, one team member had to search among 600 metal boxes in the emporium for one of ten which contained their next clue.
- After the first Roadblock, teams had to travel by cycle rickshaw to Indane Bhushan Gas Service to find their next clue.
- This leg's first Detour was a choice between Solid or Liquid. In Solid, teams traveled to Mehrotra Coal Depot, where they had to break up 175 pounds (79 kg) of coal, load it onto flatbed tricycles, and then deliver it to K.K. Jaiswal Charcoal Merchants. In Liquid, teams traveled to the Sharma Tea Corner, where they chose a tea cart and pushed it to a three-story office building, where they had to find five people from a list of ten and exchange cups of tea for their business cards. When they received five business cards, teams had to return the carts to the tea shop and exchange the cards with the owner for their next clue.
- After the first Detour, teams had to travel to the rooftop of the Charbagh Multistory Flats. There, teams met Phil, who told them that the leg was not over before handing them their next clue.

Episode summary (Episode 9)

- Teams' next clue instructed them to travel across the street to the train station and board an overnight train to a mystery destination. While on the train, a porter delivered their next clue, which directed them to search for their next clue at the train station in Jodhpur. From there, teams had to travel to Sardar Market, where they found their next clue at the top of the clock tower.
- This season's second Fast Forward required one team to have their heads completely shaved at the Kailashoham Gaure Shwar Mahadev Mandir on Kaylana Lake. Uchenna and Joyce won the Fast Forward.
- This leg's second Detour was a choice between Trunk or Dunk. In Trunk, teams had to travel to Panna Niwas and then push a 600-pound (270 kg) teak elephant 1/2 mile (0.80 km) through the streets to the Shri Kunj Bihari Temple, where they received their next clue. In Dunk, teams would have had to travel to a dyeing house and dye 25 sheets of fabric until they found the one imprinted with their next clue. All teams chose Trunk.
- After the Detour, teams had to travel to Deora Krishi Farm in order to find their next clue.
- In this leg's second Roadblock, one team member had to complete two laps in a camel-driven cart in order to receive their next clue directing them to the Pit Stop: Jaswant Thada.

Additional notes

- The head-shaving task was later revisited on season 20 as a Switchback.
- Leg 8 was a double leg, spread over two episodes.

=== Leg 9 (India → Turkey) ===
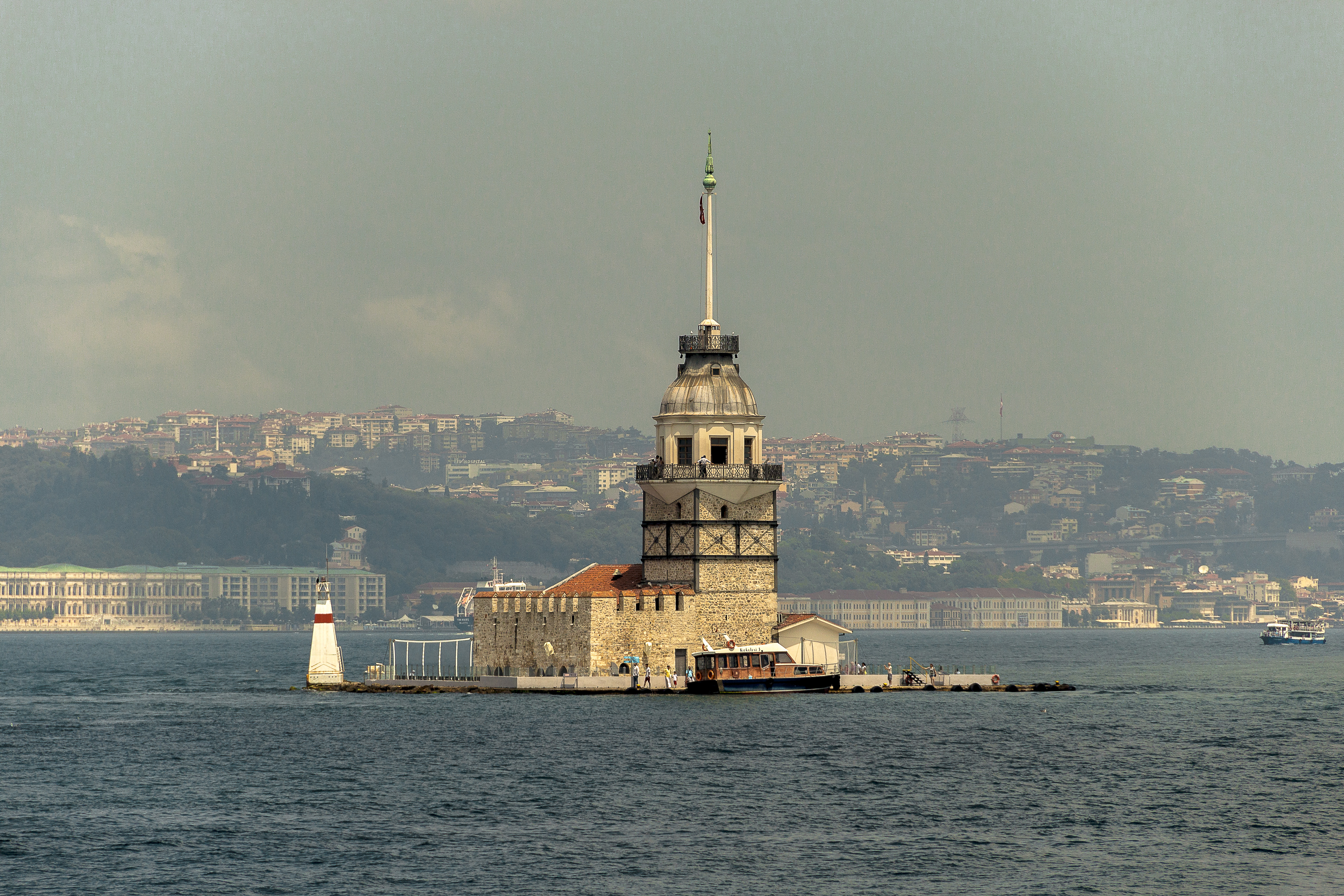
In Istanbul, teams visited the Kız Kulesi, where they searched for a Travelocity Roaming Gnome.

- Episode 10: "We Got a Gnome! We Got a Gnome!" (April 26, 2005)
- Prize: A $20,000 shopping spree on Travelocity.com and a stay in a first-class suite at the Four Seasons Hotel during the Pit Stop (awarded to Ron and Kelly)

Locations

- Jodhpur (Jaswant Thada)
- Jodhpur → Istanbul, Turkey
- Istanbul → Eminönü
- Eminönü → Kız Kulesi
- Istanbul (Galata Kulesi)
- Istanbul (Fatih – Binbirdirek Cistern or Eminönü – Yeni Mosque)
- Istanbul (Rumeli Hisarı)

Episode summary

- At the start of this leg, teams were instructed to fly to Istanbul, Turkey. Once in Istanbul, teams traveled by train and ferry to the Kız Kulesi, where they found their next clue directing them to search for one of four Travelocity Roaming Gnomes that they had to carry for the duration of the leg. Teams then traveled to Galata Kulesi to find their next clue.
- This leg's Detour was a choice between Columns or Kilos. In Columns, teams traveled to the Binbirdirek Cistern and had to use a map with coordinates to find four columns, each of which had a number for the combination needed to open a padlocked box which contained their next clue. In Kilos, teams had to travel to the Yeni Mosque and find a man with a box of scales. Using one of the scales, teams had to weigh enough people on the street until they reached a total of 2,500 kilograms (5,500 lb). When they were finished, teams had to return their scale and show their weights in order to receive their next clue.
- After the Detour, teams had to travel to Rumeli Hisarı in order to find their next clue.
- In this leg's Roadblock, one team member had to climb a 25-foot (7.6 m) ladder up the side of Halil Paşa Kulesi. There, they had to climb to the top of a tower to retrieve a key and then rappel down the side of Sarlica Paşa Kulesi. At the bottom, they had to use the key to open a book which contained their next clue. They were instructed to have the guard open the gate in order to allow their partner to enter the castle and then search the grounds for the Pit Stop.

Additional notes

- Ron and Kelly chose the special gnome which allowed them to win the leg's prize.
- This was a non-elimination leg.

=== Leg 10 (Turkey → England) ===
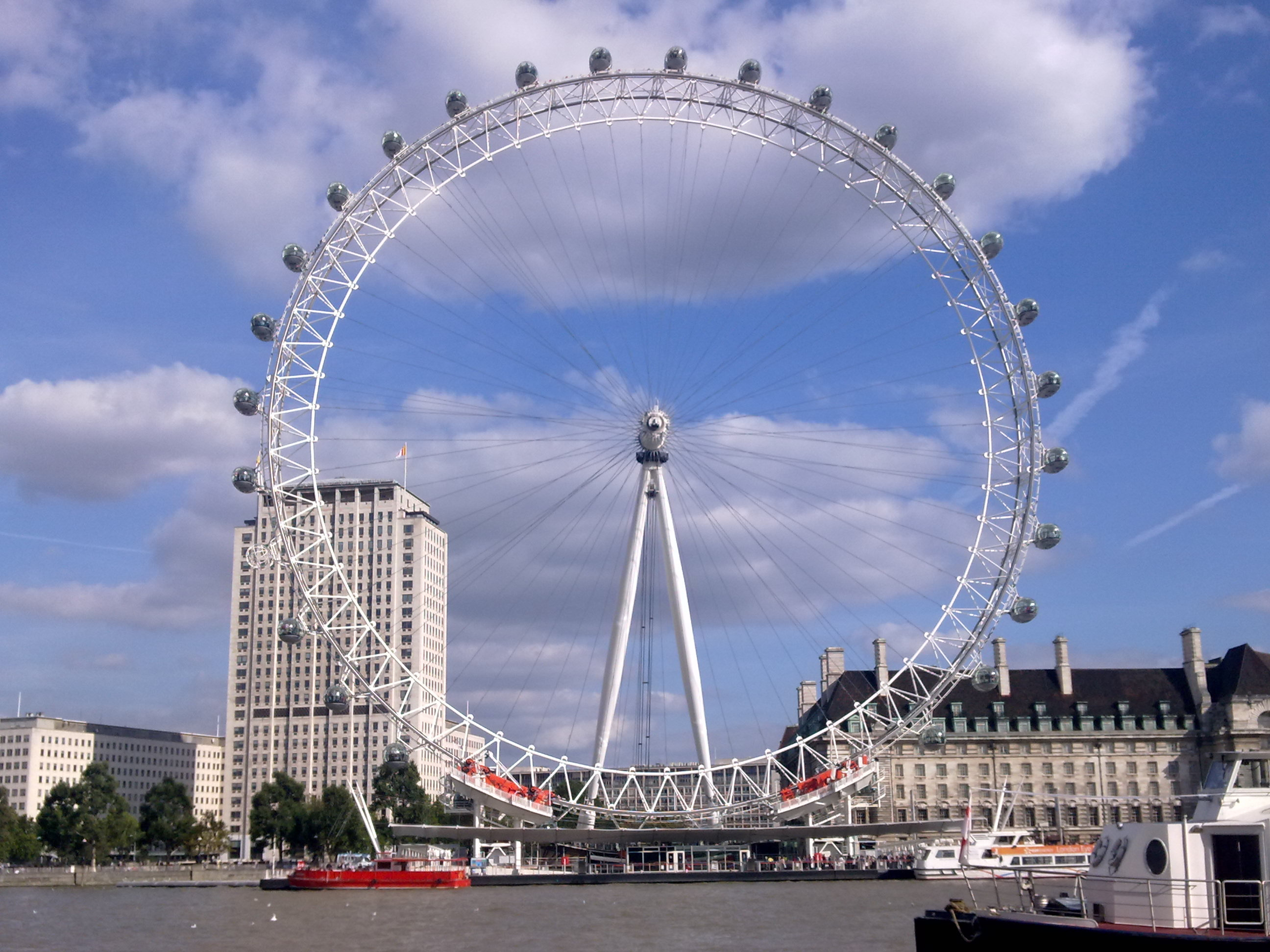
From the London Eye, teams surveyed the city for the location of their next clue.

- Episode 11: "The Devil Made Me Do It" (May 3, 2005)
- Prize: A home entertainment system for each team member (awarded to Rob and Amber)
- Eliminated: Meredith and Gretchen

Locations

- Istanbul (Rumeli Hisarı)
- Istanbul (Sirkeci Train Station)
- Istanbul → London, England
- London (Abbey Road)
- London (London Eye)
- London (London Marriott Hotel County Hall)
- London (London Underground or Battersea Park)
- London (Millennium Dome – North Greenwich Coach Park)
- London (Potters Fields Park)

Episode summary

- At the start of this leg, teams were instructed to travel to the Sirkeci Train Station and walk past a group of whirling dervishes to their next clue, which directed them to fly to London, England. Once there, teams had to find their next clue at the zebra crossing made famous on an album cover by The Beatles: Abbey Road. From Abbey Road, teams had to travel to the London Eye, board a capsule, and survey the city from the Ferris wheel in order to locate a route marker, which was at the London Marriott Hotel County Hall. There, teams found their next clue.
- This leg's Detour was a choice between Brains or Brawn. In Brains, teams took the London Underground and solved a series of three riddles: (1) exchange a luggage tag from the baggage storage in Waterloo station for their first item (a magnifying glass); (2) find the three naked men of Hammersmith – a statue in the Hammersmith tube station – for their second item (a pipe and tobacco); and (3) find the Baker Street tube station for their third item (a deerstalker hat). At 221B Baker Street, home of the Sherlock Holmes Museum, teams exchanged the items with Sherlock Holmes for their next clue. In Brawn, teams had to travel to Battersea Park and transport five 160-pound (73 kg) boats from a lake to the storage area 500 yards (460 m) away.
- After the Detour, teams had to travel to the Millennium Dome in order to find their next clue.
- In this leg's Roadblock, one team member had to drive a double-decker bus through a marked course and then park the bus in the designated parking area in order to receive their next clue, which directed them to the Pit Stop: Potters Fields Park.

Additional note

- Rob and Amber chose to Yield Ron and Kelly.

=== Leg 11 (England → Jamaica) ===
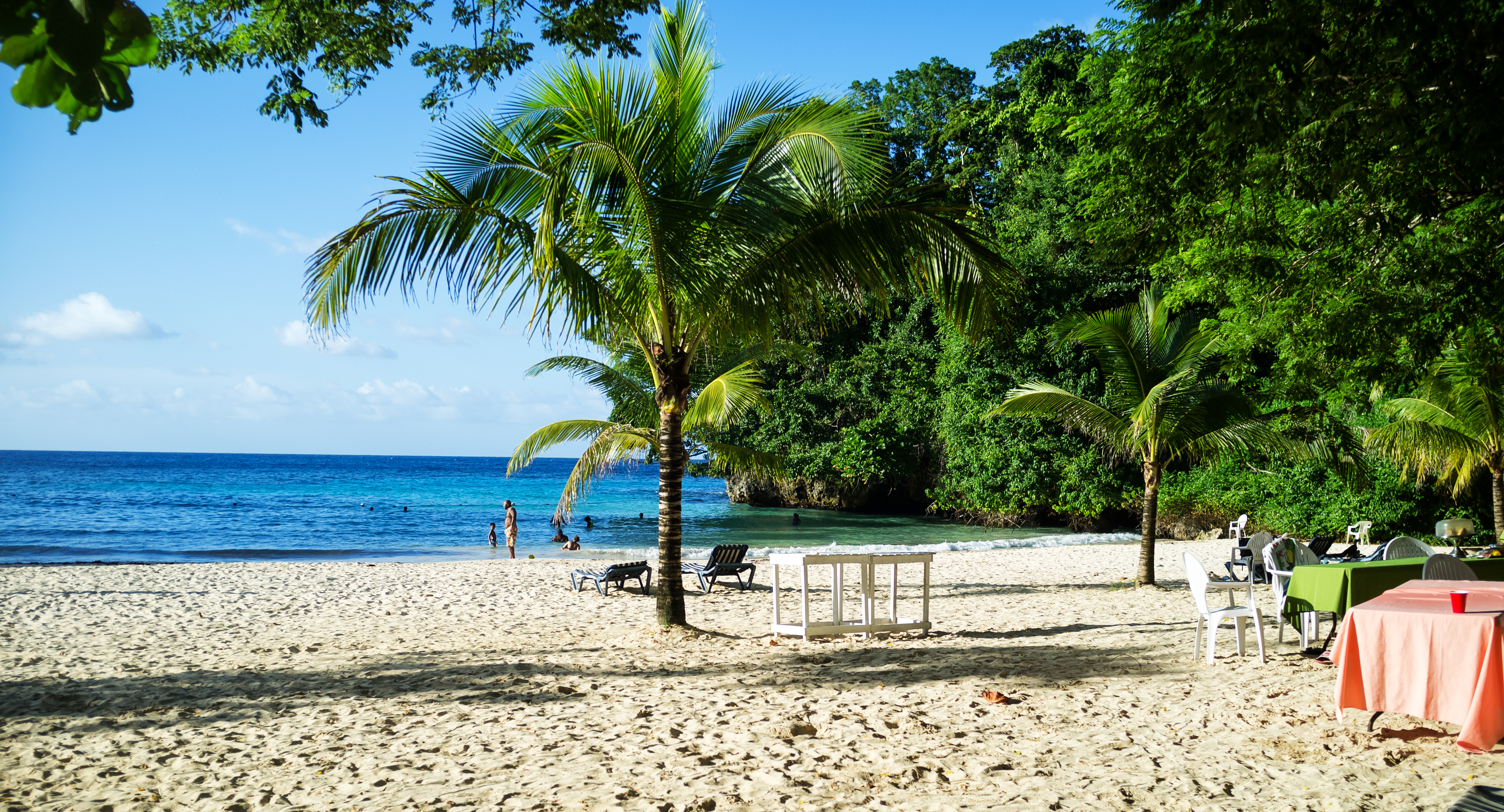
Teams spent the night at Frenchman's Cove in Port Antonio.

- Episode 12: "Five Continents, 25 Cities and More Than 40,000 Miles" (May 10, 2005)

Locations

- London (Potters Fields Park)
- London → Kingston, Jamaica
- Port Antonio (Frenchman's Cove)
- Port Antonio (Hill Preparatory School) (Unaired)
- Port Antonio (Grants Level)
- Hopewell (Round Hill)

Episode summary

- At the start of this leg, teams were instructed to fly to Kingston, Jamaica. Once there, teams had to travel to Frenchman's Cove in Port Antonio in order to find their next clue.
- In this leg's Roadblock, one team member had to do the limbo in order to determine at what time the next morning they could start the next task. For every level they achieved, they earned an additional 15 minutes. After eight attempts at the limbo, teams received their next clue instructing them to spend the night and then depart Frenchman's Cove the next morning.
- The next day, teams traveled to Grants Level in order to find their next clue.
- This leg's Detour was a choice between Raft It or Build It. In Raft It, teams would have traveled eight miles (13 km) down the Rio Grande on a bamboo raft with only a pole to steer. In Build It, teams had to build a bamboo raft using the provided tools and then paddle across the Rio Grande to find their next clue at the top of a hill. All teams chose Build It.
- After the Detour, teams had to check in at the Pit Stop: Round Hill in Hopewell.

Additional notes

- This was a non-elimination leg.
- After leaving Frenchman's Cove, teams had to travel to the Hill Preparatory School and search the desks of a classroom for their next clue. This task was unaired.

=== Leg 12 (Jamaica → Puerto Rico → United States) ===
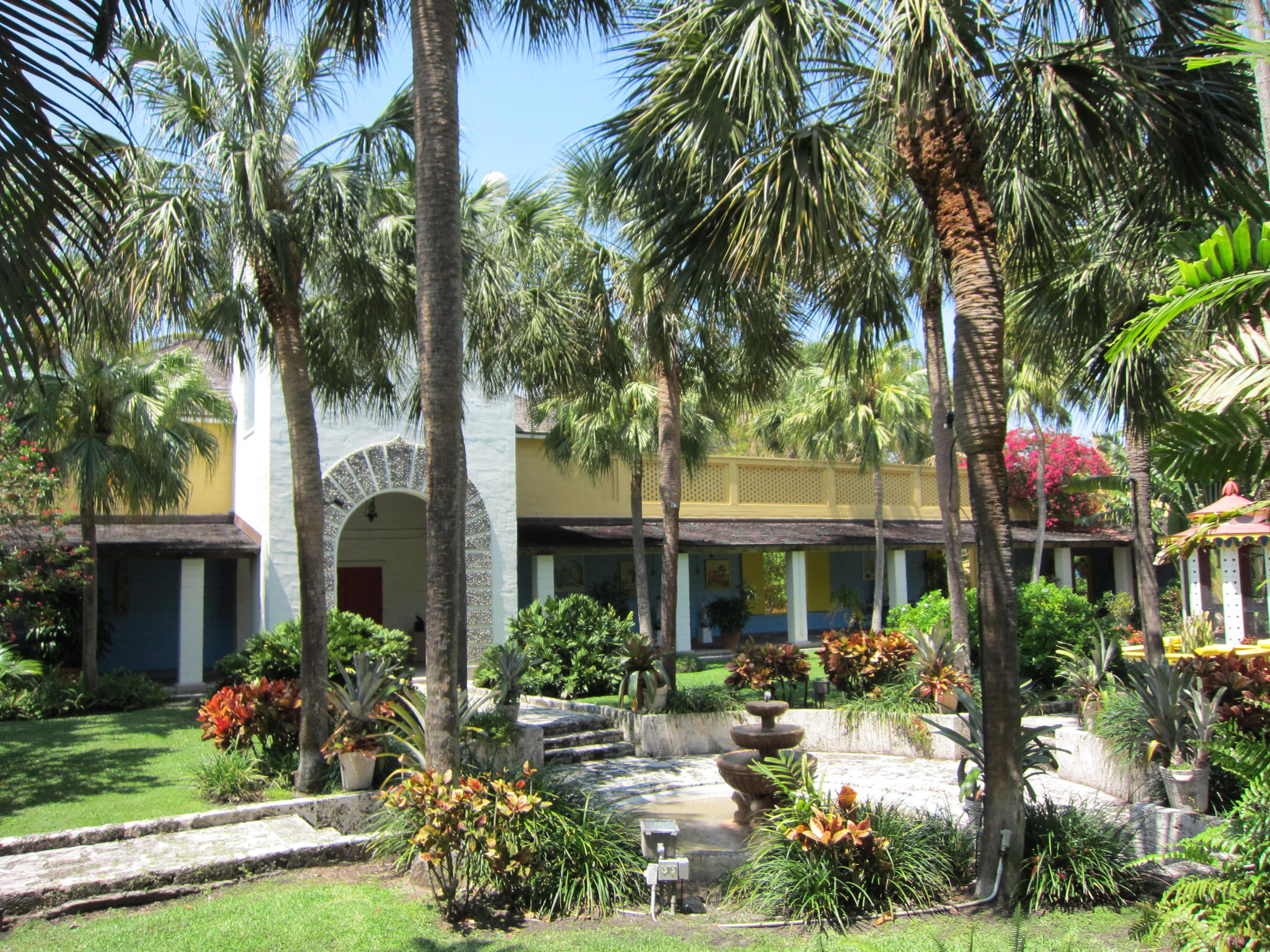
The finish line for The Amazing Race 7 was on the grounds of the Bonnet House in Fort Lauderdale, Florida.

- Episode 12: "Five Continents, 25 Cities and More Than 40,000 Miles" (May 10, 2005)
- Prize: US$1,000,000
- Winners: Uchenna and Joyce
- Runners-up: Rob and Amber
- Third place: Ron and Kelly

Locations

- Hopewell (Round Hill)
- Lucea (Cool Breeze House Onion Shack)
- Negril (3 Dives Jerk Shack)
- Montego Bay (Rose Hall)
- Montego Bay → San Juan, Puerto Rico
- San Juan (Castillo San Felipe del Morro)
- Aguadilla (El Muelle de Azucar)
- San Juan → Miami, Florida
- Miami (Rickenbacker Causeway)
- Miami (Little Havana – El Rey de los Habanos)
- Fort Lauderdale (Bonnet House)

Episode summary

- At the start of this leg, teams had to travel to the Cool Breeze House Onion Shack and pick up a sack of fifty onions. They then had to travel to 3 Dives Jerk Shack and chop the onions in order to receive their next clue. Teams were directed to Rose Hall in Montego Bay, where they found their next clue.
- This season's final Detour was a choice between Pony Up or Tee It Up. In Pony Up, teams would have had to ride a horse into the ocean and then hang onto its tail as it went around buoys and returned to shore. In Tee It Up, teams had to go to the driving range, where one team member had to hit a golf ball onto the 16-foot (4.9 m) green 140 yards (130 m) away. All teams chose Tee It Up.
- After the Detour, teams were instructed to fly to San Juan, Puerto Rico. Once there, teams had to drive to the Castillo San Felipe del Morro in order to find their next clue. From there, teams drove to an abandoned sugar refinery in Aguadilla, where they found their next clue.
- In this season's final Roadblock, one team member had to jump 30 feet (9.1 m) off of a pier, swim 90 yards (82 m) to a buoy that held their next clue, and then board a boat that returned them back to shore.
- After the Roadblock, teams were instructed to fly to Miami, Florida. Once there, teams had to travel by taxi to their next clue beneath the Rickenbacker Causeway. Teams then had to travel to Little Havana and find "The King of the Havanas", which they had to figure was a cigar shop known as El Rey de los Habanos, in order to receive their final clue directing them to the finish line: the Bonnet House in Fort Lauderdale.

Additional note

- Legs 11 and 12 aired back-to-back as a special two-hour episode.

== Reception ==
=== Critical response ===
The Amazing Race 7 received several positive reviews. Andy Dehnart felt the ending was "satisfying". Reagen Sulewski of Box Office Prophets called it "one of the most competitive, entertaining and just plain fun seasons of the show to date." Kareem Gantt of Screen Rant wrote that it was "a season in which The Amazing Race was firing on all cylinders." Conversely, Linda Holmes of Television Without Pity wrote that it was an "incredibly ungenerous, pinched, unpleasant season" due to it turning "into such a bitchy, moralizing, self-righteous morass."

Retrospective rankings of the show's seasons often place it among the best. In 2016, this season was ranked fourth out of the first twenty-seven seasons by the Rob Has a Podcast Amazing Race correspondents. In 2021, Jane Andrews of Gossip Cop ranked this season as the show's fifth best season. In 2022, Jason Shomer of Collider ranked this season among the show's top seven seasons, citing "the first time a team purposely threw the competition, taking a four-hour penalty, as a gameplay tactic," in reference to the meat-eating task in Argentina. Shomer wrote: "Using his chessboard reality show strategy, not only did Boston Rob purposely take the penalty for not eating the meat, but he also talked other teams into doing the same thing, evening out the playing field." In 2024, Rhenn Taguiam of Game Rant ranked this season ninth, writing, "The spotlight for the season easily goes to runners-up Rob Mariano and Amber Brkich, whose status as Survivor alums meant also carrying a certain degree of cunning, strategizing, and quick-thinking that not many racers exhibit."

=== Distribution ===
The DVD boxed set for season 7 was released on December 20, 2005. Lynn and Alex, Brian and Greg, Rob and Amber, and Uchenna and Joyce provided commentary for four episodes.

=== Awards ===
In September 2005, The Amazing Race 7 won the Primetime Emmy Award for Outstanding Reality Competition Program, the third consecutive award for the television series. Although seasons 5 and 6 were also eligible, producers chose season 7 since it was the most recent installment.

== Works cited ==
- Castro, Adam-Troy (2006). My Ox Is Broken!. BenBella Books. ISBN 978-1-932100-91-4.
- Perkins Jr., Arthur (2009). Circumnavigating the Globe. AuthorHouse. ISBN 978-1-449011-19-2.
