= KHW (disambiguation) =

KHW may refer to:

- Khwai River Airport
- The ISO 639-3 for Khowar language
- VEB Klingenthaler Harmonikawerke, a former instrument manufacturer in East Germany
- Khewra Chemical Works railway station (station code)
- Khw (trigraph)
