= Kelly McCorkle =

American model

- Born: December 27, 1979 (age 46); Greenville, South Carolina, U.S.
- Beauty pageant titleholder
- Title: Miss Golden Corner 2002; Miss South Carolina 2002
- Major competition: Miss America 2003 (Top 15)

Kelly McCorkle Parkison (born December 27, 1979) held the title of Miss South Carolina 2002 and placed in the Top 15 at the Miss America 2003 Pageant held on September 21, 2002, in Atlantic City, NJ. She also competed in The Amazing Race 7 with then boyfriend Ron Young and placed 3rd overall.

== Pageants ==
She competed at Miss South Carolina 2002 as Miss Golden Corner and was both a Preliminary Swimsuit and Preliminary Talent winner. This was her third try at the Miss South Carolina title. She was a 23-year-old cum laude graduate of North Greenville College, who was working as a spokesperson at the time that she won the Miss South Carolina title. Her platform was learning disabilities, which she chose because she had a learning disability and was told that she would never graduate from high school or go to college. Her talent was Lyrical Ballet. She placed in the Top 15 at the Miss America 2003 pageant. McCorkle is the half-sister of Courtney Cisson, Miss South Carolina's Outstanding Teen 2008.

== The Amazing Race ==
In 2004, she competed on The Amazing Race 7 with her boyfriend, Ron Young, a former Iraq War prisoner of war. They met after Ron was rescued by the United States Marines and during her reign as Miss South Carolina 2002. They had been dating ever since. At the time of The Amazing Race, she had been working as a legislative correspondent. They decided to compete in The Amazing Race because they wanted to experience adventure. They ended up staying on the show until the very end, placing 3rd overall. They broke up after season was done filming.

=== The Amazing Race 7 finishes ===
- An underlined blue placement with a double-dagger (‡) indicates that Ron and Kelly were the last to arrive at a pit stop in a non-elimination leg.
- An italicized placement means it was Ron and Kelly's placement at the midpoint of a double leg.
- A brown < indicates Ron and Kelly were on the receiving end of the Yield.

Roadblocks performed by McCorkle are bolded

Episode	Leg	Destination(s)	Detour choice (underlined)	Roadblock performance	Placement	Notes
1	1	United States → Peru	Rope a llama/Rope a basket	No roadblock	10th of 11	
2	2	Peru → Chile	Shop/Schelp	Ron	2nd of 10	
3	3	Chile → Argentina	Paddle/Pedal	Ron	4th of 9	
4	4	Argentina	Shipwreck/Island	**Kelly**	4th of 8	
5	5	Argentina → South Africa	Tunnels/Tribes	**Kelly**	2nd of 7	
5	6	South Africa → Botswana	Food/Water	Ron	1st of 7	
6	7	Botswana	Carry it/Milk it	Ron	2nd of 6	
8	8	Botswana → India	Solid/Liquid	**Kelly**	2nd of 5	(Note: Leg 8 was a double-length leg with two Detours and two Roadblocks shown over two episodes. The placement listed in the top row reflect the order teams arrived at the leg's halfway point.)
9	8	Botswana → India	Trunk/Dunk	**Kelly**	2nd of 5	(Note: Leg 8 was a double-length leg with two Detours and two Roadblocks shown over two episodes. The placement listed in the top row reflect the order teams arrived at the leg's halfway point.)
10	9	India → Turkey	Columns/Kilos	Ron	4th of 4‡	
11	10	Turkey → United Kingdom	Brains/Brawn	**Kelly**	2nd of 4<	
12	11	United Kingdom → Jamaica	Raft it/Build it	**Kelly**	1st of 3	
12	12	Jamaica → Puerto Rico → United States	Pony up/Tree it up	Ron	3rd of 3	
