= All American Zombie Drugs =

- Directed by: Alex Ballar
- Written by: Alex Ballar
- Produced by: Alex Ballar; Alexander Berezovsky; Johnny Kearns; Jonathan Mariande; Beau Nelson
- Starring: Beau Nelson; Wolfgang Weber; Natalie Irby; Susan Graham; Alex Ballar; Bobby Burkey
- Cinematography: Chen Chia-yu
- Edited by: Brett Register
- Music by: Evan Goldman
- Production company: Manginity Films
- Distributed by: Midnight Releasing
- Release date: 23 April 2013 (DVD)
- Running time: 87 minutes
- Country: United States
- Language: English

All American Zombie Drugs is a 2015 American zombie comedy film written and directed by Alex Ballar, starring Beau Nelson, Wolfgang Weber, Natalie Irby, Susan Graham, Alex Ballar and Bobby Burkey.

== Cast ==
- Beau Nelson as Sebastian
- Wolfgang Weber as Vinny
- Natalie Irby as Melissa
- Susan Graham as Kara
- Alex Ballar as Michael
- Bobby Burkey as Spider
- David Reynolds as Big Al
- Aidan Bristow as Barry
- Russ Cootey as Jimmy
- Brian Thomas Smith as Bobby
- Dennis Bover as Max
- Jeremie Loncka as Stone
- Stanton Prescott Hunter as Zane
- Viktor Argo as Gerard
- Johnny Kearns as Truck Driver
- Brenda Lee as Yvette
- Karina Colon as Caine
- Kayla Laws as Candy
- Alexander Berezovsky as Gene
- Erica Bardin as Tracey

== Release ==
The film was released to DVD in April 2013 and made available on Vimeo On Demand until 5 May. It was released to Amazon Prime Video on 30 June 2019.

== Reception ==
Jennifer Turner of Horror DNA rated the film 4 stars out of 5 and wrote that while it "does drag a little bit with overused running gags and minors characters that really have no point in the film", it "has everything, humor, gore, and a sharp sense of wit" and "contains a fun anti-drug message without coming off like a preachy After School Special." Jason Boyd of Fictionphile wrote: "Unlike some super indie films like this, the production level is surprisingly high. The story has more than a couple of bright spots, but you will likely wish the film had picked a lane and stuck with it." Nick Valdez of Flixist opined that the "stumbling nature of story and lack of commitment toward its main character is what keeps All American Zombie Drugs from becoming a spectacular film." Robert Kenneth Dator of Film International stated that "what plagues the production beyond tempo is a lack of strong characters and a good through line" and that there "is further a troubling sameness in every scene, a lack of variety in location, set dressing, and no apparent production design, so that what is purported to be “suburban America” looks stuck somewhere within a twenty block radius of Burbank".
