= Belmond Khwai River Lodge =

General information
- Location: Belmond Safaris, Moremi Reserve, Botswana
- Operator: Belmond Ltd.

Other information
- Number of suites: 14 luxury tents, one private suite

Website
- belmond.com/khwairiverlodge

Belmond Khwai River Lodge was a safari lodge situated in Moremi Game Reserve in the Okavango Delta in Botswana. The lodge was one of three that comprise Belmond Safaris, the others being Belmond Eagle Island Lodge and Belmond Savute Elephant Lodge. All three are reached from Maun, Botswana.

Khwai River Lodge was founded by Harry Selby (later immortalized in Hemingway's The Snows of Kilimanjaro) at his favourite campsite.

The lodge consisted of tented accommodations, with traditional African thatched roofs, on raised wooden stilts. The area is known fora range of wildlife including lions, leopards, giraffes, and buffalos. White rhinos have also been reintroduced. In addition, there are over 400 species of birds.

All three lodges that form Belmond Safaris were acquired by Orient-Express Hotels in 1992 under their original name "Game trackers". The trio of lodges was also known for a time as Orient-Express Safaris. In 2014 the company changed its name to Belmond Ltd. and the lodge was renamed "Belmond Khwai River Lodge".

The lodge ceased to be operated by Belmond in October 2023.
