= Ron Young (United States Army officer) =

Contestant on The Amazing Race

Ronald D. Young Jr.
- Born: January 10, 1977 (age 49); Villa Rica, Georgia
- Military career
- Allegiance: United States
- Branch: United States Army
- Service years: 1999–2004
- Rank: Chief Warrant Officer
- Units: Aviation Battalion, 1/227th Company C, Fort Hood, Texas
- Conflicts: 2003 invasion of Iraq
- Other work: The Amazing Race 7

Ronald D. Young Jr. (born January 10, 1977) is an American former POW in the 2003 Gulf military action against Iraq who later became a contestant in the reality show The Amazing Race 7. Young is also an Eagle Scout.

== Biography ==
Young grew up in Lithia Springs, Georgia and lives in Villa Rica, Georgia. He graduated from Douglas County High School in Douglasville, Georgia, studied mechanical engineering at Southern Polytechnic State University in Marietta, Georgia, before joining the Army.

At the time of his becoming a POW in Iraq his father was living in Lithia Springs, Georgia.

== Iraqi POW ==
Young was among seven POWs who were taken prisoner by Iraqi forces in the 2003 invasion. Back then, he was a Chief Warrant Officer whose Apache Longbow helicopter crashed in Karbala on March 24, 2003. Fellow pilot and Chief Warrant Officer David Williams, 31 from the 1-227 Helicopter Attack Battalion tried to elude capture, but they were taken prisoner by an Iraqi group who took them to Samarra, about 25 miles (40 km) south of Tikrit, Saddam Hussein's hometown.

The Iraqi forces kept the two with the members of the 507th Maintenance Company who were earlier captured along with their comrade Jessica Lynch. The 507th POWs included Patrick Miller, Joseph Hudson, Shoshana Johnson, James Riley, and Edgar Hernandez. They were rescued soon after on April 13, 2003.

== The Amazing Race ==
In 2004, he competed on The Amazing Race 7 together with his then girlfriend, beauty queen Kelly McCorkle. They were billed as the "Former POW/Beauty Queen couple" and his back story about his POW days were mentioned in the show. Young, like almost all contestants who competed there (except for well-known Survivor contestants Rob Mariano and Amber Brkich), was identified only by his first name. Ron & Kelly's relationship was strained during the competition and they broke up after the show but they still have remained friends. They eventually finished third when in San Juan, Puerto Rico they "went to the regional airport instead of the international airport," Young said, going to the wrong airport caused them to miss their flight.

=== The Amazing Race 7 finishes ===
- An underlined blue placement with a double-dagger (‡) indicates that Ron and Kelly were the last to arrive at a pit stop in a non-elimination leg.
- An italicized placement means it was Ron and Kelly's placement at the midpoint of a double leg.
- A brown < indicates Ron and Kelly were on the receiving end of the Yield.

Roadblocks performed by Young are bolded

Episode	Leg	Destination(s)	Detour choice (underlined)	Roadblock performance	Placement	Notes
1	1	United States → Peru	Rope a llama/Rope a basket	No roadblock	10th of 11	
2	2	Peru → Chile	Shop/Schelp	**Ron**	2nd of 10	
3	3	Chile → Argentina	Paddle/Pedal	**Ron**	4th of 9	
4	4	Argentina	Shipwreck/Island	Kelly	4th of 8	
5	5	Argentina → South Africa	Tunnels/Tribes	Kelly	2nd of 7	
5	6	South Africa → Botswana	Food/Water	**Ron**	1st of 7	
6	7	Botswana	Carry it/Milk it	**Ron**	2nd of 6	
8	8	Botswana → India	Solid/Liquid	Kelly	2nd of 5	(Note: Leg 8 was a double-length leg with two Detours and two Roadblocks shown over two episodes. The placement listed in the top row reflect the order teams arrived at the leg's halfway point.)
9	8	Botswana → India	Trunk/Dunk	Kelly	2nd of 5	(Note: Leg 8 was a double-length leg with two Detours and two Roadblocks shown over two episodes. The placement listed in the top row reflect the order teams arrived at the leg's halfway point.)
10	9	India → Turkey	Columns/Kilos	**Ron**	4th of 4‡	
11	10	Turkey → United Kingdom	Brains/Brawn	Kelly	2nd of 4<	
12	11	United Kingdom → Jamaica	Raft it/Build it	Kelly	1st of 3	
12	12	Jamaica → Puerto Rico → United States	Pony up/Tree it up	**Ron**	3rd of 3	

== Later life ==
Young became part of an urban legend when a viral email claiming that the Red Lobster in the town in which Young's unit was based refused to donate money to the Young family. Even though the Army "highly discourages spouses soliciting businesses on behalf of families," and that "no business should feel strong-armed into donating" Red Lobster had actually wanted to give money but had run out of gift certificates.

== See also ==
- American P.O.W.s in 2003 Iraq War
- List of Eagle Scouts
