= Brian Thomas Smith =

American actor and comedian (born 1977)

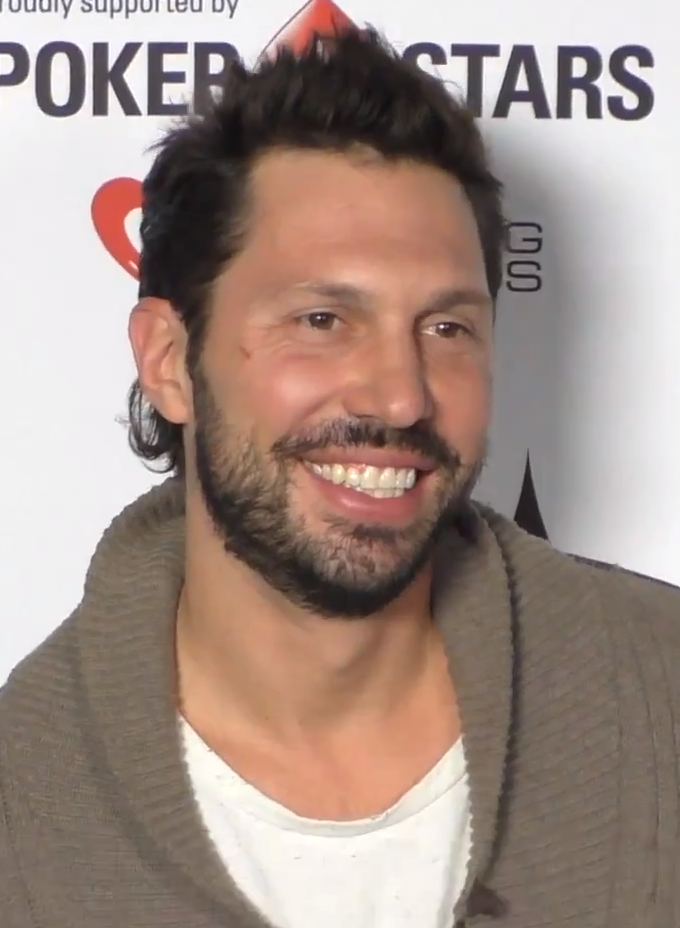
- Smith in 2016
- Born: May 13, 1977 (age 49); St. Louis, Missouri, U.S.
- Occupations: Actor; comedian; producer

Brian Thomas Smith (born May 13, 1977) is an American actor and comedian known for playing the dim-witted but kind-hearted Zack Johnson in The Big Bang Theory for nine seasons. He has also made other TV appearances on Fear Factor, Two and a Half Men, Happy Endings, The Neighborhood, 9-1-1: Lone Star, and United States of Al. On the big screen, Smith starred opposite Al Pacino and Annette Bening in Dan Fogelman's directorial debut film, Danny Collins. Smith has also starred in include Lethal Seduction, Babysplitters, The Wedding Party, and Concrete Blondes.

== Early life ==
Smith was born and raised in St. Louis, Missouri, and attended Lafayette High School in Wildwood, where he played basketball. Smith later graduated from the University of Central Missouri.

== Career ==
Smith has appeared in more than 100 commercials including Miller Lite, Pizza Hut, Burger King, State Farm, Lopez Tonight, Chevrolet, Carl's Jr., Coors Light, Budweiser, Taco Bell, DirecTV, Pop Chips, Buffalo Wild Wings, Honda, Corona, Applebee's, Dairy Queen, Audi, and Progressive Insurance.

In 2003, Smith was a contestant in episode 13 of Fear Factor. Two years later, in markets outside of the United States, he starred in a Heineken beer commercial with Jennifer Aniston. Also in 2005, Smith appeared on the reality television competition series The Amazing Race 7 with his younger brother Greg, finishing sixth overall.

In 2006, Smith was cast as the lead in Dan Fogelman's half-hour comedy pilot The 12th Man. Four years later, he joined the cast of comedy series The Big Bang Theory in a recurring role, portraying Penny's on-and-off boyfriend Zack Johnson. Smith continued to recur on the show until its 12th and final season in 2019.

In 2021, Smith was cast in a recurring role on the comedy series United States of Al, as Freddy, the new boyfriend of Vanessa, Riley's ex-wife. Smith has also guest-starred on NCIS, Shrinking, Bad Monkey, and The Really Loud House.

== Filmography ==
=== Film ===
Year	Title	Role	Notes
2006	The 12th Man	Adam Rump	TV movie
2008	No Place Like Home	Matt	Short
2009	The Moonlighters	Bob	Short
2009	Perry's Fairies		Short
2009	The Indies	Sean	Short
2010	All American Zombie Drugs	Bobby	
2012	Lucy in the Sky with Diamond	Brian	Short
2012	Surprise	Matthew	Short
2012	Hot Neighbours	Judd	Short
2012	Concrete Blondes	Karl	Short
2013	Casual	Guy	
2015	Lethal Seduction	Randy	TV movie
2015	Danny Collins	Judd/Busy Work	
2018	Big Muddy	Bo	
2020	Babysplitters	Dr Palmer	
2023	Holiday Twist	Boogie	

=== Television ===
Year	Title	Role	Notes
2003	Fear Factor	Contestant	Season 4, Episode 13
2005	The Amazing Race 7	Contestant	Eliminated, 6th place (with Greg Smith)
2006	Two and a Half Men	Emmett	Episode: "Ergo, the Booty Call"
2010	A Good Knight's Quest	Agent One	8 episodes
2010	The Indies	Sean	2 episodes
2010–19	The Big Bang Theory	Zack Johnson	Recurring role, 11 episodes
2010–11	Casual: The Series	Guy	Series regular; 17 episodes
2012	Happy Endings	Nick	"Party of Six"
2012	Wolfpack of Reseda	Vance	5 episodes
2012	Suit Up	Bjorn Hansen	Recurring role, 4 episodes
2019	The Neighborhood	Ed	Episode: "Welcome to the Bully"
2020	9-1-1: Lone Star	Andrew Reynolds	Episode: "Awakening"
2021–22	United States of Al	Freddy	Recurring role
2022	NCIS	Fantasy Football Dad	Episode: "Daddy Issues"
2022–24	The Really Loud House	Mr. Bolhofner	3 episodes
2024	Bad Monkey	Brennan	3 episodes
2024	Shrinking	Jack	Episode: "The Drugs Don't Work"
2026	Stuart Fails to Save the Universe	Zack	Episode: 2
