= Khwai =

Village

Coordinates: 19.166°S 23.750°E

Location of Khwai

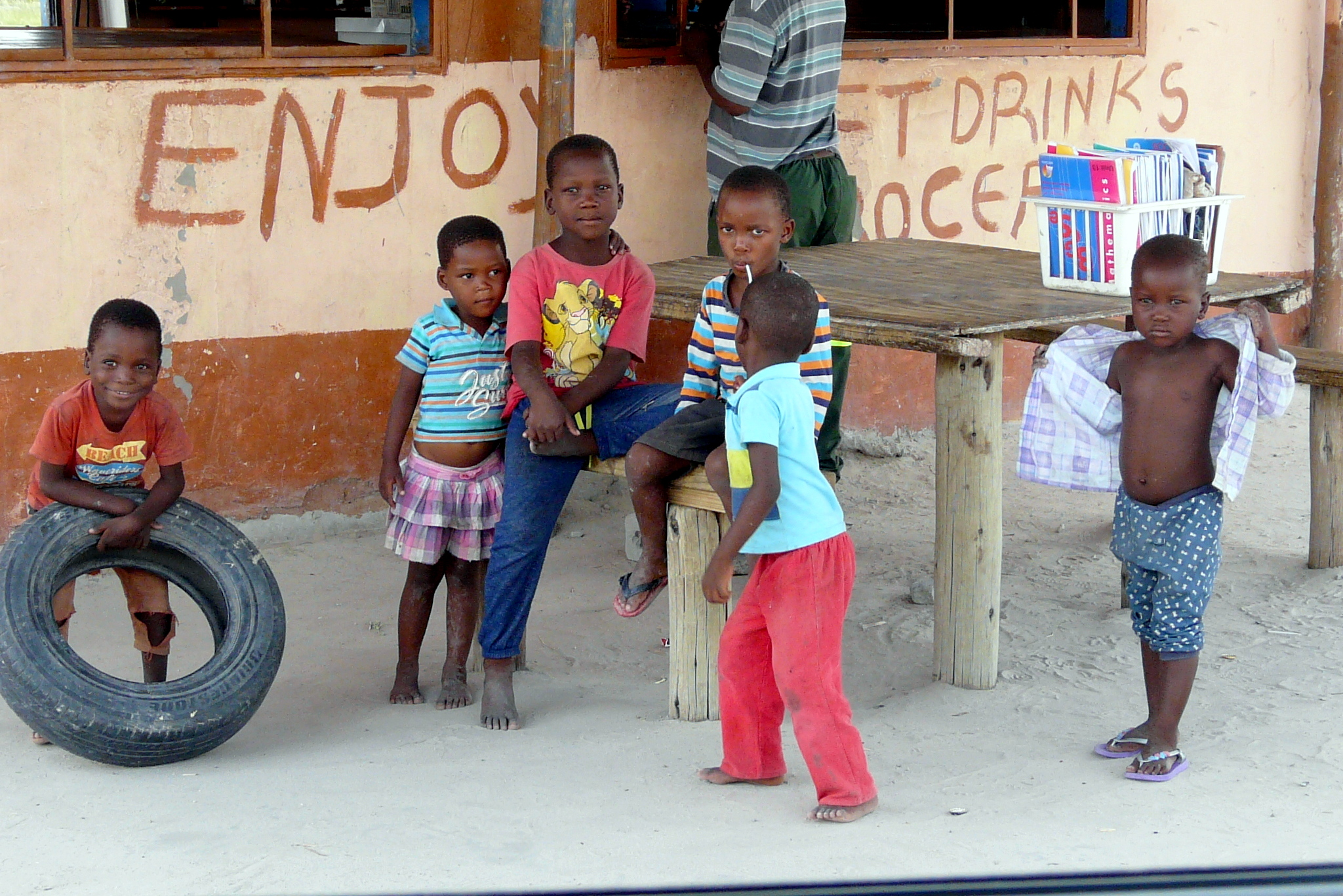
Children at play in Khwai village

Khwai is a village on the north bank of the Khwai River in the North-West District of Botswana. The river is the northern boundary of the Moremi Game Reserve, and the village is just outside the north gate of the reserve, which is on the eastern side of the Okavango Delta.

The village has a population of approximately 400 Bugakhwe or River Bushmen. Most of the inhabitants are Bugakhwe but some are Bayei as well. The Bugakhwe are one of San, Bushmen or Basarwa groups, one of the indigenous peoples of southern Africa who were traditionally hunter-gatherers. Bugakhwe or Buga-kxoe is the ancestral language of this village, but Setswana, English, and Afrikaans are also heard.

Archeological evidence suggests that various Basarwa groups have been living in Botswana for at least 22,000 years, but it is not known when the Bugakhwe identity coalesced and when they became attached to the Khwai floodplain. The elders of Khwai remember leading more traditional lifestyles of hunting and gathering up until the 1960s when they were encouraged to settle into villages. The villagers originally settled into what is now a part of Moremi Game Reserve but were forcibly removed by the Government of Botswana.

The people of Khwai are developing an eco-tourism and sustainable development program to conserve the area's unique environment. They are building a community run safari organization as part of Botswana's community based natural resource management program. Numerous lodges and safari camps surround the village.

Khwai is served by Khwai River Airport.
