= Lyrical ballet =

Lyrical ballet is an offshoot of the now-obsolete Russian lyrical (Soviet ballroom) dances. It is a lilting style of dance that uses the ballet technique along with the Soviet ballroom dance forms. The word lyrical refers to a lilting, poetic feel associated with the movements and the steps flow from the one to the next. It belongs to the genre of classical folk dance.

== History ==
The origins of lyrical ballet lie in the Soviet ballroom dances, the Russian lyrical dance in particular. The Russian lyrical dance was a progressive dance based on Russian folk tunes with a soft and smooth character, danced at medium tempo, in 2/4 or 4/4 time. Today, the nomenclature 'Russian lyrical' has lost its relevance but the dance form remains and continues to flourish under the term of lyrical ballet.

== Form and technique ==
The technique is that of ballet abiding by the rules of turnout and body alignment in which is also incorporated the different Soviet ballroom dance steps. A distinguishing feature of lyrical ballet as opposed to lyrical dance is that it does not make any departure from the classical style and takes no liberties with its rigid structure. Therefore, it is unlikely to find the turning-in of legs or finger-gestures that are common in jazz dance choreography.

== Costume ==
The costume of this dance is a flared skirt (usually knee length between the long ball-gowns and the short tutu) allowing free flow of movement between the legs.
