= Kaylana Lake =

Artificial lake in Rajasthan, India

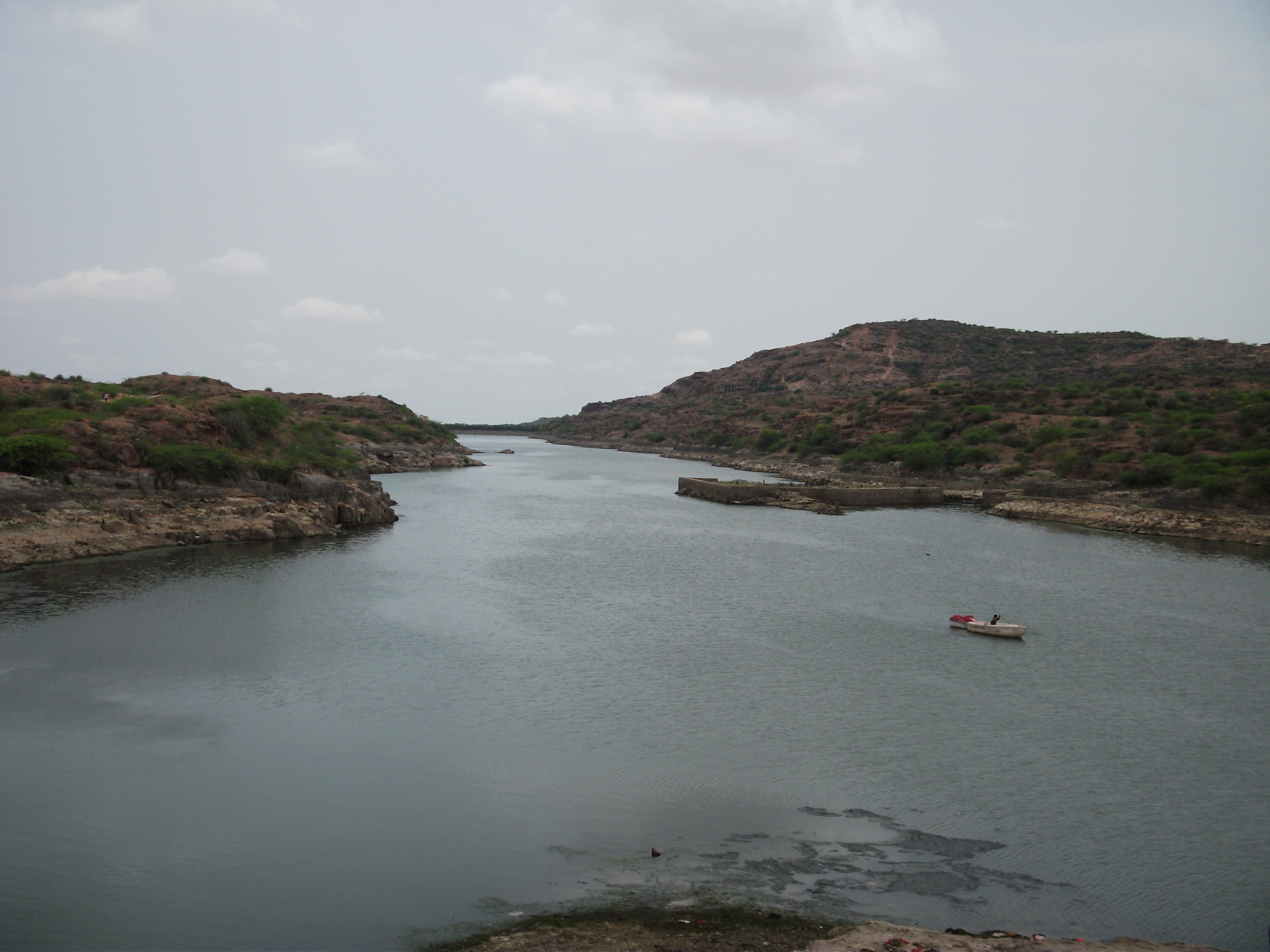
- Kaylana Lake, Jodhpur

- Location within Rajasthan
- Location: 8 km (5.0 mi) North West of Jodhpur
- Coordinates: 26°17′N 72°58′E
- Primary inflows: Hathi canal which is connected to Indra Gandhi canal
- Primary outflows: Takhat sagar and Umaid sagar
- Basin countries: India
- Surface area: 0.84 km^{2} (0.32 sq mi)
- Average depth: approx. 35 to 40 ft (11 to 12 m)
- Max. depth: approx. 45 to 50 ft (14 to 15 m) when level is high
- Settlements: Jodhpur (Rajasthan)

Kaylana Lake is located 8 km west of Jodhpur in Rajasthan, India. It is an artificial lake, built by Pratap Singh in 1872. The lake spreads over an area of 0.84 km^{2} (0.32 sq mi). In ancient times this region had palaces and gardens made by two rulers of Jodhpur - Bhim Singh and Takhat Singh. These were destroyed to make Kaylana Lake.

The lake is situated between igneous rock land formations. It receives its water from Hathi Nehar (translation: elephant canal), which is further connected to the Indira Gandhi Canal. The natural vegetation here mostly consists of Babool (Acacia nilotica and Kumat trees, and various migratory birds such as Siberian cranes are seen here in the winter season. The city of Jodhpur and all the surrounding towns and villages depend on Kaylana lake as a source of drinking water.

== Incidents ==
=== Indian Army training ===
Ten commandos of Para (Special Forces) of the Indian Army were conducting a training mission at Lake Kaylana on the afternoon of 7 January 2021. Commando Captain Ankit Gupta, along with his comrades, had to practice rescue of a drowning person, by jumping into the water from an army helicopter. Gupta's companions came out of the water after jumping from the helicopter, while Gupta did not. He died due to drowning in water and his body was removed on 12 January 2021.

A team of National Disaster Response Force searched for 3 days for Gupta but could not find him. Later 8 MARCOS (Marine commandos) were sent for the search. On 10 January, 20 additional MARCOS were sent to Jodhpur from Delhi Navy Headquarters. They started searching for Gupta underwater through digital camera from Monday. They were successful in finding Gupta's corpse on 12 January 2021.

== See also ==
- List of lakes in India
