= Khewra Chemical Works railway station =

Railway station in Punjab, Pakistan

General information
- Owner: Ministry of Railways

Other information
- Station code: KHW

History
- Former names: Great Indian Peninsula Railway

Khewra Chemical Works railway station (Urdu: کھیوڑہ کیمیکل ورکس ریلوے اسٹیشن) is located in Pakistan.

== See also ==
- List of railway stations in Pakistan
- Pakistan Railways
