= Khwai River =

River in Botswana

A lion crossing the Khwai River

The Khwai River is a river in Northern Botswana. It extends from the Okavango River and forms part of the Northern border of the Moremi Game Reserve. Not far from the river, on the North Gate of Moremi, is the BaBugkakhwe village of Khwai.

The area is served by the Khwai River Airport.
