= Khwai River Airport =

Airport in Botswana

- IATA: KHW; ICAO: FBKR

Summary
- Serves: Khwai, Botswana
- Elevation AMSL: 3,000 ft (910 m)
- Coordinates: 19°08′58″S 23°47′15″E

Map
- Location of airport in Botswana

Runways
Direction	Length		Surface
Direction	m	ft	Surface
11/29	1,130	3,707	Gravel
- Source: GCM Google Maps

Khwai River Airport (IATA: KHW, ICAO: FBKR) is an airport serving the lodges and camps around the village of Khwai in Botswana.

The runway is 4 kilometres (2.5 mi) from the Moremi Game Reserve north gate, and 700 metres (0.4 mi) from one of the Khwai River hippo ponds. The game reserve is on the eastern side of the Okavango Delta.

== See also ==
- Transport in Botswana
- List of airports in Botswana
